= List of Hindi songs recorded by Asha Bhosle =

Asha Bhosle was an Indian playback singer who has been cited by the Guinness Book of World Records as the most recorded singer in history.

== 1940s ==
=== 1948 ===
- Afsana - "Dulha Babu Tu Jhule Mein Jhul" with S. Balbir
- Char Din Ki Chandni -
  - "Char Sau Bees Hasinon Se"
  - "Taqdeer Ne Loota" with Shankar Dasgupta
- Chunaria
  - "Tere Milne Ko Jee Dhadke" with Geeta Dutt, and Zohrabai Ambalewali

=== 1949 ===
- Ek Teri Nishani -
  - "Chupke Chupke Mast Nigaahen"
  - "Teri Kaafir Jawani Ko"
- Karwat - "Baadal Ghir Aaye, Rimjhim Paani Barse" with Geeta Dutt
- Lekh -
  - "Kahin Bhi Aaj Muhabbat Nahin"
  - "O Baabu Aabad Rahega"
  - "Karle Kisise Pyaar, Jawani Do Din Ki" with Mohammed Rafi
  - "Yeh Qafila Hai Pyaar Ka" with Mukesh
  - "Kahin Hai Pyaar Ka"
  - "Kubwar Ji, Dhadak Dhadak Jiya Jaaye Re"
- Neki Aur Badi - "Raam Duhayi Hai" with Rajkumari
- Parda -
  - "Mere Pyare Sanam Ki Hai Pyari Gali"
- Raat Ki Rani -
  - "Hai Mauj Mein Apne Begaane"
  - "Hamare Dil Lar Tera Ikhtiyar Hona Tha"
- Roomal -
  - "Hum Sab Ke Sab Hoshiyar" with Mohammed Rafi

== 1950s ==
=== 1950 ===
- Anmol Ratan - "Kaale Kaale Badalon Mein Paani"
- Bahurani -
  - "Yeh Kehdo Unse Jinhe Aashiq-e-Dilgir Kehte Hai" with Shamshad Begum
  - "Bas Itna Bata Do Jiye Ya Mare" with Shamshad Begum
- Bawre Nain -
  - "Ghir Ghirke Aasman Par" with Rajkumari
  - "Mere Roothe Hue Balma" with Rajkumari
  - "Mohabbat Ke Maron Ka Haal" with Mohammed Rafi
- Bhagwan Shri Krishna -
  - "Sundar Sundar Phool Kamal Ka"
  - "Dol Rahi Kyun Uski Naiya"
  - "Kya Gaaye, Woh Kya Gaaye"
  - "Naina Mile Rasiya Se"
- Bhimsen -
  - "Aayi Aayi Bahaar Karke Singhaar"
  - "Koi Aaye Koi Jaaye"
  - "Mashalein Jalti Suna Rahi Hai"
  - "Piya Chupke Se Aake Bol Re"
- Bhimshma Pratigya - "Dhal Gaya Asha Ka Sooraj"
- Bijli -
  - "Taqdeer Bata, Kya Meri Khata"
  - "Hum Toh Ho Gaye Badnaam Sawariya" with Mukesh
- Biwi -
  - "Birah Ki Raat Mohse"
  - "Mausam Hai Namkeen Sawariya" with Geeta Dutt
  - "Mere Mann Ke Aangan Chand Chamka"
- Chor -
  - "Jaate To Ho Par Yaad Rahe"
  - "Barbaad Hue Par Aah Na Ki"
- Madhubala -
  - "Ab Na Jaayegi Yeh"
  - "Are O Denewale Tune Kaisi Zindagi Di Hai"
  - "Pyaar Bhi Dard Banega"
  - "Mujhe Maar Gayi O Balam"
  - "Poochho Maine Dil Se Apne"
- Muqaddar -
  - "Aati Hai Humko Yaad Janwary Farwary" with Kishore Kumar
  - "Balma Hai Diya Tujhko Dil" with Kishore Kumar
  - "Ek Do Teen Chaar, Baghon Mein Aayi Bahaar" with Kishore Kumar
  - "Madhur Pyaar Ka Taar Kabhi Yeh Toote Na" with Arun Kumar Mukherjee
  - "Jo Karna Hai Kar Lo Aaj" with Kishore Kumar, and Arun Kumar Mukherjee
- Nili - "Naacho Neel Akash Ke Taaro"
- Sabak -
  - "Dheere Dheere Haank Re Gaadi" with Surinder Kaur
  - "Dil Mein Shama Jale"
- Sati Narmada -
  - "Lajaaye Rahi Akhiyan Nigodi Re"
  - "Beech Saba Mori Paayal Baaje"
- Wafaa -
  - "Gehri Gehri Nindiya Mein Soye Matwale" with Geeta Dutt
  - "Idhar Dekho Zara"
  - "Aayi Mehekti Raat Dulhaniya"

=== 1951 ===
- Bade Bhaiyya - "Sada Khush Rahe Tu Rula Denewale"
- Daman -
  - "Chale Hain Teer Nazar Ke"
  - "Yeh Ruki Ruki Hawayen" with Lata Mangeshkar
- Dasavtaar - "Mori Gori Ke Laal Huye Gaal Re"
- For Ladies Only -
  - "Ashqon Ka Gar Hai Maut"
  - "Mera Mann Jhoom Jhoom" with Talat Mahmud
- Gumasta - "O Chale Jaaye Mohabbat Ka"
- Gazab -
  - "Tere Karan Sabko Chhoda" with H. Khan Mastana
  - "Nazar Milake Muskura Ke"
- Imaan -
  - "Bachpan Ka Zamana Yaad Hai" with Talat Mahmud
  - "Chakma De Kar Haye Bedardi"
  - "Doodh Ka Doodh Aur Paani Ka Paani"
  - "Saiyan Chhup Aap"
  - "O Zulmi Naina Roye Jaa Tu"
  - "Koi Aa Jaaye Paas Mere"
  - "Mera Jee Chahta Hai Ki"
  - "Tum Bade Woh Ho Mohabbat Ja Maza" with Talat Mahmud
- Ishwar Bhakti -
  - "O Nirmohi"
  - "Koi Aanewala Hai" with Sulochana Kadam
- Jai Mahakali -
  - "Aaja Balam Ji Saajan Ji"
  - "Duniya Mein Basanewale"
- Jai Mahalaxmi -
  - "Chhumak Chhumak Chhunk Nartan Karta (version 1)"
  - "Makhan Ke Churanewale"
  - "Holi Khele Re Kahan"
- Jeevan Tara -
  - "Hansna Hum Bhool Gaye"
  - "Kya Bataye Kya Maza Iss Zindagi Mein" with G. M. Durrani
  - "O Chhup Chhup Ke Sapnon Mein" with G. M. Durrani
  - "O Mehlon Mein Rehnewale" with Sulochana Kadam
  - "Jagmag Jagmag Deep Jale"
- Johari -
  - "Arre O Sanam Loote Hain Hum"
  - "Jab Lagi Chot Pe Chot" with Mohammed Rafi
- Kashmir -
  - "Na Ro Taqdeer Ko Ae Dil"
  - "Hansi Chhen Lee, Dillagi Chheen Lee"
  - "Jawaani Ke Din Hain" with Pramodini Desai
  - "Main Hoon Chhori Naye Fashion Ki" with Devendra Mohan
- Lachak -
  - "Dil Ki Woh Chhodati Hai" with Mohammed Rafi
  - "Na Jaane Kiski Nazar Pad Gayi"
- Mukhda -
  - "Tum Aji Dil Mein Bas Rahi Ho"
  - "O O Jaanewale, Dil Laagi Ko Bujha"
  - "Mukhda Balam Ka Chanda Ko Sharmaye"
  - "Dil Gaya Ram Ji Seene Se"
  - "Jaa Teri Meri, Meri Teri" with Mohammed Rafi
- Murliwala - "Jaisi Karni Waisi Bharni" with Sudhir Phadke
- Pyar Ki Baaten -
  - "Unko Rupaye Mein Solah Aane" with G. M. Durrani
  - "Humein Chhod Ke Na Jaana"
- Ram Janma -
  - "Ghar Ghar Ayodhya Mein" with Badrinath Vyas
  - "Pyari Pyari Re"
  - "Hua Raam Ka Janma"
  - "Mann Ki Baat Kahi Na Jaaye"
  - "Jaise Rakhe Rahiye Raam"
- Saagar -
  - "Kaun Sunega Mere Dil Ki Pukaar"
  - "Mann Beena Ke Taar Chhed Kar"
- Sabz Bagh -
  - "Apni Tasveer Se Kehdo" with Mohammed Rafi
  - "Jo Kuchh Hamein Kejna Hai" with Mohammed Rafi
  - "Qadam Qadam Par Beechhe Hai Kaante"
  - "Na Karna Kisise Mohabbat"
  - "Yaad Teri Aayi Toh Main Chori Chori Royi Re"
- Saudagar -
  - "Dil Se Dil Ko Pyaar Hai" with G. M. Durrani
  - "Ab Toh Hamare Dil Ka Ishaara Badal Gaya" with G. M. Durrani
- Shri Ganesh Janma -
  - "Aaj More Aangna Mein"
  - "Main Bandhi Prem Ki Dor"
- Shri Vishnu Bhagwan -
  - "Upkaar Karo Bhagwan"
  - "Raja Mori Nagri Mein Dheere Dheere Aana"
  - "Jai Vishnu Bhagwan"
  - "Aayenge Aaj Mere Jeevan Ke Nath Re"
- Stage -
  - "Dil Machalne Laga"
  - "Jisko Na Lagi Ho Chot"
  - "Kisi Ke Ghar Mein Toh Ghee Ke Chirag Jalte Hain"
  - "Ummeedein Loot Gayi Apni"
  - "Jagmagati Diwali Ki Raat Aa Gayi"

=== 1952 ===
- Aandhiyan -
  - "Dard Bant Raha Hai"
  - "Dil Ka Khazana Khol Diya"
  - "Woh Chand Nahin Hai, Dil Hai Kisi Deewane Ka" with Hemant Kumar
- Aladdin Aur Jadui Chirag -
  - "Ho Sake Toh Dil Ke Badle Dil" with Mohammed Rafi, Shamshad Begum, and Chitragupt
  - "Sharma Ke Aye Zara Mast Ada" with Shamshad Begum
- Amar Shaheed -
  - "Do Din Ki Khushi Dekhi"
  - "Itni Baat Bataa De"
  - "Tera Mera Pyar"
- Anjaam - "Balaam Ho Toh Aisa" with Shamshad Begum
- Badnam -
  - "O Piya Re Ji Chalo" with Mohammed Rafi
- Bhakta Puran -
  - "Toota Sitara Neel Gagan Se"
  - "Ek Din Chameli Kunj Mein"
  - "Dwaare Aaj Baaje Badhaiyan"
- Goonj - "Pyaar Bhi Aata Hai Kabhi" with Talat Mahmud
- Chham Chhama Chham -
  - "Chal Ri Ameeran Jhak" with Kishore Kumar
  - "Jhoom Uthe Duniya" with Kishore Kumar
  - "Pyar Bhare Dil Hai Mile Nadiya Kinare" with Kishore Kumar
  - "Laddu Bhi Hai Pedda Bhi Hai" with Kishore Kumar
  - "Zara Chupke Se Naina Mila" with Kishore Kumar
  - "Kismat Ke Khel Dekho Dekho Mere Babu" with Jagmohan
  - "Ye Duniya Hai Bazar Babu" with Shamshad Begum, and Kishore Kumar
  - "Achha Wo Tum The Haay Zalim Tum The"
  - "Yeh Zindagi Hai Jeene Ke Liye"
  - "Aa Pardesi Baalma More Aangna"
- Devyani -
  - "Baat Takat More Naina Haare"
  - "Madhur Madhur Sapnon Mein Aaj"
  - "Mere Mann Mein Umang"
  - "Prem Ki Mala Kahin Toot Na Jaaye"
- Lal Kunwar - "Bachke Humse Bhala Sarkar Kahan Jaaoge" with Geeta Dutt
- Maa -
  - "Is Duniya Mein Humne Dekhe" with Afzal Hussain
- Maharani Jhansi -
  - "Le Lo Veer Bahadur"
  - "Jhoom Jhoom Ke Ghatayen Aayi"
- Mordhwaj -
  - "Gupchup Un Sang Ho Gayi Akhiyan Chaar" with Mubarak Begum, and Dileep Kumar Roy
  - "Mera Mann Hai Magan" with H. Khan Mastana
- Sangdil -
  - "Dharti Se Door Gore Baadalon Ke Paar" with Geeta Dutt
  - "Dard Bhari Kisi Ki Yaad"
- Tamasha -
  - "Thi Jinse Palbhar Ki Pehchan Bane Ab Man Ke Vo Mehman"
  - "Koi Jal Jal Mare Koi Phansi Chadhe"
- Usha Kiron - "Jaago Bhor Suhani Aayi" with Geeta Dutt, Zohrabai Ambalewali, and G. M. Durrani
- Veer Arjun -
  - "Tere Dware Nand Dulare"
  - "Baaje Rumjhum Paayaliya"
  - "Sakhi Sapnon Mein Saajan Aaya"
  - "Karoon Gori Poojan Main Toh"
  - "More Ghungroo Baaje Jhan Jhanan" with G. M. Durrani
- Vishwamitra -
  - "Sajanwa Aan Milo"
  - "Neel Kamal Par Dole Bhanwara"
  - "Man Mein Mere Jhoolo"
- Zamane Ki Hawa -
  - "Waale Ki Pyaar Karen" with H. Khan Mastana
  - "Malaan Toh Aayi Bikaner Se" with H. Khan Mastana

=== 1953 ===
- Aabshar - "Tere Gham Ko Chhupana Hai"
- Aag Ka Dariya -
  - "Rut Barkha Ki Aayi Koyaliya Kuk" with Sulochana Kadam
  - "Samajh Na Duniya Ko Ghar Khushi Ka" with Lakshmi Roy
  - "Jaa Chali Ja O Ghata" with Mohammed Rafi
  - "Kehta Tha Zamana, Par Humne Na Maana" with Mohammed Rafi
  - "Kat Jayegi Jawani Roye Ya Muskura Le"
  - "Mujhko Maalum Nahi Tujhko Khabar Ho"
  - "Ram Kare Mohe Par Lag Jaye"
  - "Kehta Tha Zamana Magar (Sad)"
- Alif Laila - "Raatein Bheeg Jaayegi"
- Anand Bhawan -
  - "Tere Dil Jo Kehta Hai Kar Deewane" with G. M. Durrani
  - "Nanhe Munhe Raja Ki Salgirah Aayi Re" with Shamshad Begum
- Armaan -
  - "Jab Duniya Badle Hain Phir Kyun Na Badle Hum"
  - "Main Paankh Lagaake Ud Jaaoon"
  - "Chaahe Kitna Mujhe Tum Bulaao Ji"
  - "Bol Na Bol Ae Jaanewale" with Talat Mahmud
- Bahadur -
  - "Aa Aa Badarwa, Aa Dheere Aa" with Santram
  - "Meethi Meethi Khushboo Thi"
  - "O Bhangji, Rola Rola Aao"
  - "Shaayad Ki Bahaar Aayi"
- Bhagyawan - "Naari Nahin Hai Sapna"
- Chacha Chaudhary -
  - "Koi Hai, Koi Hai, Jawani Ko Jagao Na" with Mohammed Rafi
  - "Hansna Gana Mauj Manana Duniya Se" with Mohammed Rafi
  - "Chali Radha Piya Dhundhan Ko"
  - "Mere Piya, Chhede Jiya"
  - "Mori Chham Chham, O Chham Baje Payal"
  - "Ja Dekhi Teri Preet Re"
  - "Bin Barkha Sawan Sukha"
- Char Chand - "Hai Yeh Wohi Aasmaan (female)"
- Daera -
  - "Kaho Dhola Utaaren Kahaar Kahaar"
- Dard-e-Dil - "Pyaar Ho Gaya Mujhe"
- Dara -
  - "Naach Se Apne Jaadu Jagaati Hoon Main" with Bande Hasan
- Dharm Patni - "Laagi Tumse Lagan, Mere Bhole Sajan"
- Ek Do Teen -
  - "Tumhe Chupke Se Dil Mein Liya Jo Basa" with Mohammed Rafi
  - "Piya Jo Bulaaye Toh Kahun Main Kya Ji" with Mohammed Rafi
  - "Chal Meri Gadiye Tu Chhuk Chhuk Nikal" with Mohammed Rafi, and Minal Wagh
  - "Bela Bambina Oye Bela Bambina"
  - "Lo Phir Chand Nikal Aaya"
  - "Ek Do Teen Ho To Karo Eitbar"
  - "Mile Nain Se Nain Toh" with Minal Wagh, and Pramodini Desai
  - "Thumak Thumak Chali Kamini" with G. M. Durrani
- Firdaus -
  - "Aaja Ke Dil Tujhko Ro Ro Pukaare"
  - "Kisi Bewafa Ke Sataye Huye Hain"
- Footpath -
  - "Suhana Hai Yeh Mausam"
  - "So Ja Mere Pyare So Ja"
  - "Piya Aaja Re"
  - "Kaisa Jadu Dala Re"
- Gauhar - "Haule Haule Dheere Dheere, Dil Mera Leke Chale" with Mohammed Rafi
- Gharbaar -
  - "Aaja Mere Piya, Jhukti Hain Duniyawale"
  - "Chhup Chhupke Aaya Koi Mere Khwab Mein"
  - "Udhar Hain Husn Ka Jalwa" with Talat Mahmud
  - "Khet Pakae Ud Jaa" with Surendra
- Gul Sanobar - "Suno Ji Suno Ji Jaani"
- Hazaar Raaten -
  - "Teri Yaad Aa Rahi Hai" with Mohammed Rafi
  - "Meri Zindagi Pe Na Muskura"
- Humsafar - "Kisi Ne Nazar Se Nazar Jab Mila Di" with Talat Mahmud
- Husn Ka Chor -
  - "Ho Gaya Tere Majnu Ko Ishq Ka Bukhaar" with Mohammed Rafi
- Indrasen -
  - "Na Socha Tha Kabhi Humne Ki"
  - "Jhan Jhan Jhan Jhan Baaje More Mann Ka Sitaar"
  - "Mori Angiya Pe Chhayi Bahaar Balma"
- Jeevan Jyoti -
  - "Balma Ne Man Har Leena"
  - "Chandni Ki Paalki Me Baithkar"
  - "Sakhi Ri Darshan Pyaase Nain"
  - "Chhayi Kaari Badariya Bairaniya" with Lata Mangeshkar
- Laila Majnu -
  - "Yaad Teri Zindagi Ka Saz Ban Kar Reh Gayi"
  - "Dekh Li Aye Ishq Teri Meherbani" with Talat Mahmud
  - "Baharo Ki Duniya Pukare Tu Aaja" with Talat Mahmud
- Madmust -
  - "Beech Bajariya Paaon Pakad Kar Bola"
  - "Chaal Anokhi Dhang Niraale"
- Mahatma - "Kaun Yeh Loot Ke Hans Diya" with Prakash
- Naina -
  - "Bhool Gayi Sudh Budh" with Ashima Banerjee
  - "Meri Zindagi Ek Aisa Diya"
- Naag Panchami -
  - "Aarti Karo Hari Har Ki"
  - "O Naag Kahi Jaa Basiyo Re"
  - "Meri Chunariya Udaaye Liye Jaaye"
  - "Mere Angana Mein Aaye Jabse Sajan"
  - "Dharti Se Gagan Tak Dhundundu Re"
  - "Mera Janam Kisi Ko Rulaaye Na"
  - "Dharti Ka Nahi Nari Ka Sansar" with Mohammed Rafi
  - "Na Jaane Kaisi Buri Ghadi Mein" with Mohammed Rafi
- Naulakha Haar - "Aana Chaahun, Aa Na Sakoon Main" with Arvind Kumar
- Nav Durga -
  - "Dekho Ri SKhi Rang Bhari Holi Aayi" with Laxmi Bai
- Paapi -
  - "Meri Zindagi Hai Tu Mujhse Teri Just Ju" with Mohammed Rafi
  - "Ae Jazbaye Mohabbat Itna Asar Dikha De"
  - "Aa Jane Bahaar Aa Ja"
  - "Na Pehlu Me Dil Hai Na Muh Me Juban Hai"
  - "Kaun Kahe Unse Jaake Huzur"
  - "Abhi Abhi Bahaar Thi"
- Parineeta -
  - "Gore Gore Haathon Mein Mehndi Rachake"
  - "Tum Yaad Aa Rahe"
  - "Aye Baandi Tum Begum Bano" with Kishore Kumar
- Pehli Shaadi -
  - "Ae Dard-E-Mohabbat Rok Unhen"
  - "Khuli Aankh Jab Tere Pyar Mein"
  - "Door Sajan Ka Gaon"
  - ""Raat Chandni Saath Tumhara"
  - ""Tadap Ke Kah Raha Hai Dil"
- Rail Ka Dibba - "Bhagwan Teri Duniya Mein Insaan Nahi Hai"
- Raj Mahal -
  - "Ada-O-Naaz Ko Zaalim Tere Shamsheer Kehte Hai" with Shamshad Begum
  - "Chhayi Ghata Din Aayi Bahaar Ke"
  - "Kuchh Jaan Na Thi, Pehchaan Na Thi"
  - "Do Desh Dulaare Veeron Ka" with Savitri
  - "In Shokh Haseenon Se Kabhi Dil Na Lagaana" with Shamshad Begum
  - "Idhar Aao Ik Baar Phir Pyaar Kar Lein" with Madan Mahendra
- Raj Ratan -
  - "Mere Dil Mein Aaj Machi Hulchul Re"
  - "Sapnon Ki Nagariya Hai"
- Rangila -
  - "Dheere Dheere Sang Mera Gaane Laga" with Mohammed Rafi
  - "Dil Aaj Nera Gaane Lagaa" with Mohammed Rafi
  - "Dil Mein Basa Le" with Mohammed Rafi
  - "Matwale Nain Kaahe Hum Par Jaadu Daale" with Mohammed Rafi
  - "Shubh Din Aaye" with Mohammed Rafi
  - "Diya Jale Chamke Taara" with Mohammed Rafi
  - "Laage Karejwa Teer Sakhi" with Mohammed Rafi
  - "Mehmaan Ban Kar Aaye"
- Shahenshah -
  - "Aayi Bahaaren Leke Raaten Pyaar Ki"
  - "Koi Raag Chhed, Dabi Aag Chhed"
- Shamsheer -
  - "Dheere Dheere Aana Piya Chal Ke"
  - "Gori Tere Liye Sabka Jiyara Dole" with Kishore Kumar
  - "Jawano Ho Jaao Taiyar" with Hemant Kumar, and Jagmohan Bakshi
- Shikast - "Chamke Bijuria"
- Shuk Rambha -
  - "Deep Jalaao Anagna Laakh Laakh"
  - "Jaag Re Jogi, Jaag Re Samadhi"
  - "Jyoti Jagaao Ri"
  - "Kahaan Hai Tu"
  - "Na Na Jogi Tu Akele Na Jaa"
  - "O Mere Maai, De De Bidaai" with Master Gopal
- Suhaag Sindoor -
  - "Main Toh Chali Re Piya Ke Des"
  - "Chupke Se Ho Gaya Pyaar" with Sailesh Mukherjee
- Surang - "Mast Bahaar Hai, Pyar Hi Pyar Hai"
- Teen Batti Chaar Raasta -
  - "Bengali Sindhi Gujarati Marathi Punjabi Song" with Geeta Dutt, Lata Mangeshkar, Zohrabai Ambalewali, and S. Balbir
- Thokar -
  - "Ae Gham-e-Dil Kya Karoon (duet)" with Talat Mahmud
  - "Ae Gham-e-Dil Kya Karoon (female)"
  - "Jhilmil Sitare Chanda Ke Dware"
  - "Hawa Gungunaye Fizaa Muskuraye"
  - "Ye Kaisi Raat Aayi Hai"
  - "Kuch Tum Jo Kaho Humse"
  - "Mauj Ki Aur Na Toofan Ki Khabar"
  - "Kajri Rain Kate Na Un Bin"

=== 1954 ===
- Adhikar -
  - "Dil Mein Hamare Kaun Samaaya" with Kishore Kumar
  - "Zindagi Haseen Hai"
  - "Degree Lekar Baithe Hai Sab"
- Alibaba and 40 Thieves -
  - "Sharma Ke Laja Ke"
  - "Dekho Ji Chand Nikla"
  - "Ae Saba Unse Keh Zara" with Mohammed Rafi
- Amar -
  - "Radha Ke Pyare Krishna Kanhai"
  - "Ek Baat Kahun Mere Piya"
- Amar Kirtan -
  - "Hari Om Tat Sat (version 2)" with S. D. Batish
  - "Jaat Paat Aur Oonch Neech Ko" with S. D. Batish
  - "Jin Dhyayo Shyam, Tin Paayo Shyam"
  - "Thaare Rail Chalu Re Sanwariya"
- Ameer -
  - "Tumhe Yaad Hoga Baag-e-Mohabbat"
  - "Subah Ki Angdaai Hoon Main"
  - "Pyaar Karo, Pyaar Badi Cheez Hai"
  - "Bol Saamne Aake" with S. Balbir
- Angarey - "Pyaar Bulaye Tohe"
- Aulad -
  - "Mann Tinak Tinak Naache"
  - "Gayi Gham Ki Raat"
  - "Chanda Se Pyaare, Aankh Ke Taare"
- Aurat Teri Yehi Kahani -
  - "Raat Guzarti Jaaye, Ajahun Na Aaye"
  - "Mukurati Ghata, Gungunati Hawa"
  - "Diya Tumne Naiya Ko KaisaSahara"
- Baadbaan -
  - "Dekho Chanchal Hai Mera Jiya"
  - "Thukra Ke Teri Duniya Ko"
  - "Jai Deva Ho, Hum Pe Rakho Prem Ki Najariya" with Manna Dey
- Barati -
  - "Teri Nazron Ne Humko Chheda Hai" with C. Ramchandra
  - "Naach Le Baawariya" with S. Balbir
  - "Kis Naam Se Pukaarun"
- Bazooband - "Bina Dosh Seeta Maat Ko" with Hridaynath Mangeshkar
- Boot Polish -
  - "Nanhe Munhe Bachche Teri" with Mohammed Rafi
  - "Tumhare Hain Tumse Daya Mangte Hain" with Mohammed Rafi
  - "Thahar Jara O Janewale" with Manna Dey, and Madhubala Zaveri
  - "Chali Kaunse Desh Gujariya Tu" with Talat Mahmud
  - "Sari Duniya Hai Mujhpe Deewani"
  - "Raat Gayi O Raat Gayi" with Manna Dey
- Chakradhari -
  - "Baadal Ki Palki Pe Hoke Sawaar" with Hemant Kumar
  - "Chal Re Cahl Re, Chaak Mere" with Hemant Kumar
  - "Kya Kuchh Bhi Nahin Bhaati"
  - "Meri Choli Seena Sambhal Ke"
  - "Rajaji Mere Saiyan Ko Karo Jurmana"
  - "Tum Prabhu Bade Dil Ke Kathor Nikle"
  - "O Meri Saas Ke Ladke" with Mohammed Rafi
  - "Vaah Re Dayalu, Vaah Vaah Dayalu" with Mohammed Rafi, and Kavi Pradeep
- Chandni Chowk -
  - "Har Baat Poochhiye Yeh Haqeeqat" with Shamshad Begum, and Lata Mangeshkar
  - "Tera Dil Kahan Hai"
  - "Aijam Ji Jitne Bhi Gham Hai"
- Chhora Chhori - "Jor Garam Babu, Malayam Mazedaar" with Seeta Agarwal
- Chor Bazaar -
  - "Taaron Ki Palki Mein Aayi Jawaani"
- Dak Babu -
  - "Ae Dil Ankhon Se Pee Le Ansoo"
  - "Dil Ki Duniya Jagmagati" with Talat Mahmud
  - "Sapne Toot Gaye"
- Daku Ki Ladki -
  - "Sataa Le Humein Aasman"
  - "Gulon Ko Khilaoon, Baharon Se Kheloon"
- Danka -
  - "Dekho Dekho Ji Dekho Kahan Chali Ithlaati" with Shamshad Begum
  - "Qismat Hai Mujhse Khafa"
  - "Raat Jaagi, Jaaga Hai Pyaar"
  - "Tu Laakh Kiye Jaa Sitam"
  - "Tum Meri Zindagi Mein Ek Chand Banke Aana"
  - "Yeh Masti Ka Aalam, Umango Ka Mausam"
  - "Raan Duhaai Hai"
  - "Shaamon Sehar Hai Safar Hi Safar" with Manna Dey
- Dhobi Doctor -
  - "Aansoo Piye Teri"
  - "Aaja Badli Ke Sang"
  - "Pihu Pihu Bole Papihara"
  - "Jhilmil Tare Neel Gagan"
  - "Taron Se Ankhiyan Milaun"
- Dhoop Chhaon -
  - "Dekho Rakhi Ka Aaya Tyohar" with Mohammed Rafi
  - "Jhuk Ke Zameen, Choom Raha Aasmaan" with Mohammed Rafi
  - "Naache Naache Yeh Mann Mora" with Mohammed Rafi
  - "Pyaare Pyaare Nainon Se Laage Jab Nainwa"
  - "Sitare Hanse Jab Kanwal Nuskuraye"
- Durga Puja -
  - "Yeh Gajra Le Lo" with Master Gopal
  - "Jai He Durga Mata" with Mohammed Rafi
  - "Piya Tumse Hua Pyaar"
  - "Maiya He Tere Bina"
  - "Mera Ho Balidaan"
  - "Gali Gali Mein Phirun"
  - "Mera Mann Hai Magan" with Mohammed Rafi
- Ehsan -
  - "Mere Bas Howe Suhaag Ki Rekha"
  - "Mera Banka Balamwa Lakhon Mein Ek"
  - "Ek Baar Keh De Sajan"
  - "Bairi Hai Bedard Zamana"
- Guzaara - "Jhoothi Hai Kahani Teri"
- Halla Gulla -
  - "Yun Na Chhedo Balam" with Mohammed Rafi
  - "Teri Bhi Chup Aur Meri Bhi" with Mohammed Rafi
  - "O Dil Pukaare Aana Tadpana" with Mohammed Rafi
  - "Nainon Ke Teer Jidhar Toot Pade" with Mohammed Rafi
  - "Main Hoon Baanka Chhabila Jawaan Re" with Mohammed Rafi
  - "Jaane Kya Baat Hui Nain Jhuke" with Mohammed Rafi
  - "Honewali Hoke Rahegi Gaaon Ek Tarana" with Mohammed Rafi
  - "Dil Dhadka Main Fadka" with Mohammed Rafi
  - "Chalti Ka Naam Gadi" with Mohammed Rafi
- Hamlet -
  - "Sitamgar Ka Maza Paaya"
  - "Chaahe Sataye Woh, Chaahe Rulaye"
  - "Ankhon Mein Pyaar Mere"
  - "Aaja O Mere Pyaar"
- Ilzam -
  - "Sun Mere Rasiya Balam" with Kishore Kumar
  - "ABC ABC Meri Sapnon Mein Chori Chori" with Kishore Kumar
  - "Kehti Hai Yeh Thandi Hawa"
  - "Duniya Mein Aake Jisne Dekha Na Pyaar Maa Ka"
  - "Dekhun Jab Tak Teri Raah"
- Jagriti -
  - "De Dee Hame Azaadi"
  - "Chalo Chale Maa (happy)"
  - "Chalo Chale Maa (sad)"
- Kalakar -
  - "Ek Matwali Do Nainon Se"
  - "Mere Gham Ki Unko Khabar Kyun Nahi"
  - "Haye Re Meri Angdayi"
  - "Hum Ab Chhod Ke Gori"
  - "Kisi Ki Nazar Ka Jo Ghayal Nahin Hai"
  - "Meri Paayal Ki Jhankaar Kare Lalkaar"
  - "Saiyan Sapne Mein Mile"
- Kasturi -
  - "Murliwale Se Laage Nain"
  - "Mujhko Apna Banaya Door Door Se"
- Kavi - "Chali Shehar Ki Naar" with C. Ramchandra
- Khaiber -
  - "Bhari Mehfil Mein"
- Khushboo -
  - "Ankhon Mein Ankh Daal Ke Dekha To"
  - "Udhar Chand Nikla" with G. M. Durrani
  - "Dhoondhla Dhoondhla Aasmaan Hai" with Shankar Dasgupta
  - "Aurat Mari Toh Mard Ko" with Mala
- Laadla -
  - "Zindagi Do Din Ki Hai Hans Le"
  - "Bura Hua Jo Unse" with Talat Mahmud, Mohammed Rafi, and Shamshad Begum
  - "Pyaar Nahin Chhupta Chhupane Se" with Talat Mahmud
  - "Haye Haye Re Zamana"
- Laila -
  - "Dilwalon Ki Jeet Hui"
  - "Hasraten Barbaad Hai"
  - "Sunte Jaao Meri Khamosh Nigaahon Ka Salaam"
  - "Nau Do Gyarah"
  - "Main Naukar Hoon Chaukidar Ka" with Shamshad Begum
- Lal Pari -
  - "Meri Tabahi Pe Tu Bhi Chup Hai (version 1)"
  - "Meri Tabahi Pe Tu Bhi Chup Hai (version 2)"
  - "O Dilwalo Dil Ko Sambhalo" with S. Balbir
- Majboori -
  - "Aankhen Ro Ro Har Gayi"
  - "Bhanware Ne Kali Se Kuchh Bol Diya"
  - "Yeh Behta Huwa Paani"
  - "Teri Poojan Ko Bhagwan Mana" with Hamida Banu
- Mahatma Kabir -
  - "Aur Kab Tak Aansu"
  - "Ke Sang Kheloon Pag Pe"
  - "More Mandir Ablaun Nahin"
  - "Kaise Kahoon Apne Mann Ki" with Amirbai Karnataki
- Malka-e-Alam Noor Jehan -
  - "Aahon Mein Jalta Jaa"
  - "Sun Bhi Le Parwardigar"
  - "Woh Zaalim Hai Jo Roothenge"
  - "Chhup Chhupke Koi Mere"
  - "Jo Dil Hi Dil Mein Rote Hain"
  - "Tumko Mile Vaah Jo Tumne Maanga"
- Mangu -
  - "Dol Mere Mann Pyaar Se"
  - "Bol Pardesiya Ye Tune Kya Kiya"
  - "Man More Ga Jhum Ke"
- Mastana -
  - "Raja Ka Haathi Le Le" with Mohammed Rafi
  - "Ro Ro Ke Yaad Kare" with Mohammed Rafi
- Mayurpankh - "Yeh Barkha Bahaar" with Lata Mangeshkar
- Meenar -
  - "Lele Lele Bahaar Mein Bahaar Ke Maze"
- Miss Mala -
  - "Chori Chori Aana Na Khidki Tale Tum (version 1)" with Mohammed Rafi
  - "Chori Chori Aana Na Khidki Tale Tum (version 2)" with Mohammed Rafi, and Kishore Kumar
- Nagin - "Hasinon Mujhse Mat Poochho" with Hemant Kumar
- Paheli Tarikh -
  - "Hum Hain Waasi Swarg Ke"
  - "Gaa Le Geet Khushi Ke"
- Parichay - "Main Janam Janam Se Hoon Dukhiya"
- Pensioner -
  - "Meri Jhuki Jhuki Ankhiyon Mein"
- Pyase Nain -
  - "Mere Jeevan Mein Yeh Aaya Hai Kaun" with Talat Mahmud
  - "Manva Tu Haule Haule Gaaye Ja Geet"
  - "Mukh Se Kuch Na Bol Bawari"
  - "Raat Suhani Aayi Dekho Chamke Nanhe"
  - "Ek Chand Banane Wale Ne Sau Chand"
  - "Jo Dil Pe Tere Yeh Tes Lagti"
  - "Kanto Me Daman Ulajh Gaya" with Bulo C. Rani
- Radha Krishna -
  - "Neel Gagan Mein Baadal"
  - "Ghir Aaye Ras Megh (version 1)"
  - "Ghir Aaye Ras Megh (version 2)"
- Ramman -
  - "Diya Jalake Saari Raat"
  - "Mohabbat Ke Jo Deewane Hain"
  - "Teri Dard Hai Meri Zindagi"
  - "Tum Toh Huye Harjaai Saiyan"
  - "Udaas Nazron Se Poochh Lijiye"
  - "Humein De Ke Chali Hai Judaai" with Sudha Malhotra
  - "Rutu Albeli Aayi" with Shamshad Begum
  - "Le Chhod Chali Duniya Teri"
- Rasiya -
  - "Giri Bhanwar Mein Naav Hamaari"
  - "Yeh Kaali Kaali Ratiya"
- Ritu Vihaar -
  - "Aare Re Re Chale Buland Ke Teer"
  - "Dekho Aaya Re Basant"
  - "Garam Garam Chale Lu"
  - "Khili Sharad Ki Poornima"
- Saltanat -
  - "Zindagi Hai Mauj Ki"
  - "Hum The Intezaar Mein"
  - "Yeh Matwala Gaadiwala Jiya Le Jaata Hai"
  - "Chhupa Kar Laayi Hoon Main"
- Samaj -
  - "Kayi Din Se Saawan Barsaata Hai" with Sailesh Mukherjee
  - "Mil Ke Nigaahen"
  - "Gham Toh Bana Mere Liye"
  - "Chalte Bane Leke Jiya"
  - "Nainon Ne Jhoola Daala"
- Samrat -
  - "Yeh Khamoshiyan Yeh Samaan (version 1)"
  - "Shabaab Hi Shabaab Hai"
  - "Sabko Mubarak Naya Saal"
- Savdhan -
  - "Raat Muskurati Hai Dhadkanen Jagati Hai" with Geeta Dutt
  - "Nazar Se Dil Nein Samaanewale"
  - "Muhabbat Ki Nazar Jab Meherbaan"
  - "Chalo Hato, Jaao Rasiya"
  - "Jhananan Baaje Mori Jhanjhan"
  - "Aaj Kisi Ke Haathon Ne"
- Shama Parwana - "Ho Jaake Laage Naina" with Suraiya
- Shart -
  - "Dil Mera Hai Deewana"
  - "Chala Kafila Pyar Ka"
  - "Jana Na Chhodke"
  - "Mere Humsafar"
- Shiv Kanya -
  - "Ruturaaj Saaj Saaj Kar Aaye"
  - "Om Namah Shivay"
  - "Jay Ambe Jagadambe, Dhadak Uthi Jwala"
  - "Kaisa Kutil Vidhaan Hai Tumhara"
  - "Jay Durge De De Aaj Vardaan"
  - "Ab Kaun Mera Sansar Mein"
- Shiv Ratri -
  - "Aa Gayi Maha Shivratri Padharo Shankar Ji"
  - "He Gangadhar Paani Do"
  - "Jo Teer Chalaye Usi Pe"
  - "O Keh Dena Dooj Ke Chand Zara"
  - "Oonchi Oonchi Haveli Mere Liye"
  - "Shankar Ki Pooja Chhite Na"
- Shobha -
  - "Dil-e-Nadaan Haal-e-Gham Na Suna"
  - "Maina Boli Sun Re Tote"
- Shri Chaitanya Mahaprabhu -
  - "Gokul Ke Is Raas Ko Karne Chaknachur" with Mohammed Rafi
  - "Kanha Kanha Poonam Ki Raat Hai"
- Suhagan -
  - "Lalna Aayega Shor Machayega"
  - "Kaahe Ko Byahi Bides"
  - "Mere Lalla Ko Sulayegi Nindiya"
- Taxi Driver -
  - "O Dekho Maane Nahee Ruthee Hasina" with Jagmohan Bakshi
  - "Jeene Do Aur Jiyo"
- Tilottama -
  - "Phoolon Se Maarna, Nakhre Sawarna"
  - "Nirali Yeh Duniya, Yeh Mausam Salona"
  - "Nayi Rani Ji Ka Raaj Ho Gaya"
  - "Maine Paayal Bajaayi Jab"
  - "Jab Jab Niklega Chand"
- Toote Khilone -
  - "Bhagwan Ne Jab Chheen Liya Maa Ka Sahara"
  - "O Raat Rangili Chham Chham Naache"
- Tulsidas -
  - "De De, Aisa Baalma"
  - "Jeevan Bhar Aansoo Mein Doobi"
  - "Naiya Jaldi Le Chalo Mujhe (version 1)" with Mohammed Rafi
  - "Naiya Jaldi Le Chalo Mujhe (version 2)" with Mohammed Rafi
  - "Radha Ji Ke Kunwar Kanhaiya" with Mohammed Rafi
- Waris - "Badhaai Ho, Gaao Badhaiyan" with Bande Hasan
- Watan -
  - "Ye Sar Rahe Na Tan Rahe" with Mohammed Rafi
  - "Taqdir Ka Kehna Hai Ki"
  - "Jahan Chand Ka Noor Bikhra Hua Tha"
  - "Tu Salamat Rahe Hazar Baras"
  - "Dard-e-Mohabbat Dard-e-Judaai"

=== 1955 ===
- Aaj Ki Baat - "Meri Nagri Mein Kyun Aaya" with Mohammed Rafi
- Abe–Hayat -
  - "Ae Dile Nashad Tera Shukriya"
  - "Nigahe Mili Aur Tum Muskuraye"
  - "Nachu Re Gau Re Jhum Jhum Sanam"
  - "Nasha Pila Ke Girana To Sabko Aata Hai"
  - "Aa Ja Hai Tera Intezar"
- Adil-e-Jahangir - "Aaja Dilruba, Teri Dilruba"
- Albeli -
  - "Tum Sang Laagi Balam Mori Ankhiyan"
  - "O Balma Kyun Na Karun Main Tose"
  - "Chhod Babul Ka Ghar"
- Alladin Ka Beta -
  - "Zakhmi Hai Paaon Mere" with Mohammed Rafi
  - "Tere Darbar Mein Aaye" with Mohammed Rafi
  - "Dil Bas Mein Nahin, Dhadkan Ki Kasam" with Mohammed Rafi
  - "Main Hoon Hoor Arab Ki"
  - "Hum Pyaar Ke Maaron Ka Dushman Hai"
  - "Bada Rangeen Fasana Hai" with Geeta Dutt
- Amanat -
  - "Chhal Chhal Pani Hamari Zindgani" with Manna Dey
  - "Re Murkh Tu Kya Jane" with Manna Dey
  - "Meri Wafaye Tumhari Jafaye"
  - "Jab Tumne Mohabbat Chhin Li"
- Baap Re Baap -
  - "Piya Piya Piya" with Kishore Kumar
  - "Phool Se Galon Pe" with Kishore Kumar
  - "Raat Rangeeli Chamke Taare"
  - "Tum Na Aaye"
  - "Jaane Bhi De"
  - "Deewana Dil Gaaye"
  - "Kahe Dil Yeh Deewana"
  - "Main Bhi Jawaan Dil Bhi Jawaan"
  - "Ab Yeh Bataa Jaye Kaha"
  - "Tu Na Bataa"
- Bandish - "Mohe Apna Bana Lo Saajan"
- Bindiya -
  - "Yeh Bahaar Baar Baar Keh Rahi Hai"
  - "Gudiya Hamari Hai Jaadu Ki Pudiya"
  - "Aaja Tujhe Main Ek Baar Seene Se" with Kamal
  - "Hi Tujhko Mubarak Ab Teri Taqdeer" with Rajkumari Dubey
  - "Jisko Diya Hai Dil Maine"
  - "Majboor Wafaa Ke Haathon Se"
- Char Paise - "Dil Hai Nishana, Nainon Ke Teer Ka"
- Daku -
  - "Dil Ke Badle Dil Hi Loongi" with Mukesh
  - "Lagi Lagi Lagi Hai, Lagi Lagi Lagi Chot Dil Par"
  - "Qismat Dikhate Hai Kaise Kaise Rang"
  - "Sangdil Ban Gaya"
  - "Mere Resham Ka Roomal" with Anwar Hussain
- Darbar - "Kyon Dil Pe Rakha Hai" with Madhubala Zhaveri
- Devdas -
  - "O Albele Panchhi Tera Door Thikana Hai" with Usha Mangeshkar
- Ganga Maiya - "Do Taar Mann Ke Mil Gaye"
- Ghamand -
  - "Unka Shikwa Kya Kare"
  - "Kahin Thokar Na Lag Jaaye"
  - "Duniya Ka Sitam, Taqdeer Ka Gham"
  - "Aaya Re Aaya Saawan Yeh"
  - "Tere Dil Ki Dhadkanein Mere Dil Mein Aaye" with Mohammed Rafi
  - "Saathi O Saathi Humne Tumko Kitni Khushi Se" with Mohammed Rafi
- Ha Ha Hee Hee Ho Ho -
  - "Dheere Hans Ke Kuchh Keh Diya"
  - "Dil Maange Chnad Khilauna"
  - "Ha Ha He He Ho Ho"
  - "Na Na Na Main Toh Kehti Rahungi"
  - "O Main Postman, Kisika Khat"
  - "Vaah Baag Nahin Hai"
- Haseena -
  - "Abhi Dil Toh"
  - "Teri Mehfil Uth Kar Deewnae Kahan Jaaye"
  - "Saiyan Tere Haathon Mein Gajra Ban Jaoongi"
  - "Mast Adaayen Mast Karam"
  - "Dil Pe Kaisi Bekhudi Chhaane Lagi"
  - "Bewafa Na Mita"
  - "Bada Siyana, Kabhi Na Aaun Main Toh"
  - "Arre Woh Chand Mere Dil Ki Haalat" with Bulo C. Rani
- Hatimtai Ki Beti -
  - "Kaali Kamliwaale Tum Pe Laakho Salaam" with Mohammed Rafi
  - "Dil Uski Mohabbat Me Hamesha Se"
  - "Aasman Se Mujhpe Bhi Barsa De Aag"
  - "Humba Humba Humka Duniya Ghar Hai"
  - "Suni Suni Hai Bahar Chhodo Inkar"
- House No. 44 -
  - "Dum Hai Baki To Gham Nahi"
  - "Dekh Idhar O Jadugar"
  - "Tum Chalo Hamare Sath Balma"
- Insaniyat -
  - "Bansuriya Bole, Madhur Ras Ghole" with Mohammed Rafi
  - "Aisi Nainwa Ki Lagi Kataar, Ke Jiya Kare" with Mohammed Rafi
  - "Haseenon Ka Manzoor"
- Jagadguru Shankaracharya -
  - "Aaj Kaisa Yeh Suraj Chamka Re"
  - "Aaja Re Aaja O Nand Dulare"
- Jai Mahadev -
  - "Ae Machhere Ne Khel Kiya" with Manna Dey
  - "Chapal Meen Si Ankhiyan" with Manna Dey
  - "Dhoondhe Naina Bawre"
  - "Piya More Aane Laage Pran"
  - "Rasiya Re Rasiya, Batiya Suno" with Moti Sagar
- Jalwa -
  - "Falak Tera, Zameen Teri" with Mohammed Rafi
  - "O Main Hoon Shahi Lakadhaara" with Mohammed Rafi
  - "Har Roz Hasinon Ka"
  - "Surma Bareli Ka, Kaajal Hai Dilli Ka"
  - "O Jaanewale, Jaane Se Pehle"
  - "Shama Kehti Hai Parwane Se"
  - "Tu Hansta Hi Raha Bhagwan"
  - "Hum Do Ladke, Jeb Ke Kadke" with Mohammed Rafi, and Shaninder Pal
- Jashan -
  - "Bade Khubsoorat Bade Woh Hansi Hai" with Mohammed Rafi
  - "Maarenge Kas Kas Ke Baan Saiyan" with Mohammed Rafi
  - "Roothi Huyi Khushi Ko"
  - "Chun Chun Ke Baaghon Se Layi Main Kaliyan"
  - "Bolo Yeh Duniya Kiski"
  - "Yunhi Dil Se Aa Rahi Hai"
- Jawab -
  - "Nigahen Mila Le, Mohabbat Basa Le"
  - "Dil Hi Mein Dil Ki Reh Gayi"
  - "Main Toh Ho Gayi Re Barbaad"
  - "Balam Bade Bhole"
  - "Ankh Michauli Jhele Chand Sitaare"
  - "Ab Mere Ram Rakhwala" with G. M. Durrani
- Jhanak Jhanak Payal Baaje -
  - "Udhdat Rang Lay Gat"
  - "Chhiyoran Chhiyo" with Mohammed Rafi
- Joru Ka Bhai -
  - "Naina Kahe Ko Lagaye"
  - "Chhanana Chhun Chali Gori"
- Khandaan -
  - "Lakhon Ke Bol Sahe Tere Liye"
  - "Saawan Ka Mausam Hai Sanwra"
- Lagan - "Leke Meetha Bajaa Nindiya"
- Lakhon Mein Ek -
  - "Yeh Dil Hai Bada Beimaan"
  - "Meethi Meethi Neend Mein Soyi Thi Jawaani"
  - "Jaan Gayi, Haan Main Jaan Gayi"
- Lutera -
  - "Mera Ammi Se Pyaar Rahe" with Sabita Chowdhury
  - "Ek Pyaar Bhara Dil Laaya Hoon" with Mohammed Rafi
  - "Jaan Gaye Haan Jaan Gaye"
  - "Gham Ki Baaten Bhool Jaa"
- Madh Bhare Nain -
  - "Deewane Armaanon Ki Bheed Mein" with Kishore Kumar
  - "Naye Zamane Ka Naye Paigham Sunane Aaye"
- Madhur Milan -
  - "Ae Dil Mere Udaas Na Ho"
  - "Aaja Aaja Ajja Re Dekho Raat Aayi Hai" with Mohammed Rafi
- Mahasati Savitri -
  - "Aaj Teri Piya Ki Talash Ho Rahi Hai"
  - "Aji Kaise Kahoon Mera Pyaar Lo"
  - "Kaise Koi Le Jaayega Mera Piya Ki Pran"
  - "Kanya Hokar Bhi Jiske Gun Ki Charcha"
  - "Mera Pyaar Idhar, Taqdeer Udhar"
  - "Chori Chori Chandni Mein Chakori Chali Jaaye" with Mohammed Rafi
- Marine Drive -
  - "Aji, Tum Aur Hum Ho Sath Sath"
  - "Main Hoon Phooljhadi, Tu Hai Shola"
  - "Dil Bhi Mit Jaye To Ulfat Dil Se"
  - "Raat Sunsan Hai, Zindagi Viran Hai"
  - "Mohabbat Yun Bhi Hoti Hai" with Mohammed Rafi
- Mast Qalandar -
  - "Raat Ke Sar Se Aanchal Dhalka"
  - "Jee Bhar Ke Pee Le Aankhon Ke Jaam"
  - "Aa Bhi Jaao Sanam"
  - "Dil-e-Nadaan Zamaane Mein" with Talat Mahmud
  - "Dil Ki Mehfil Sazaane Roz" with Talat Mahmud
- Mastani -
  - "Basre Ki Hoor Gori Gori"
  - "Gadiwale Ho Zara Haule Haule Chalna"
  - "Dekho Dekho Jhoomti Barsaat" with Mohammed Rafi
  - "Dil Toot Gaya, Har Tukde Se Aahat"
- Milap - "Piya Khulke Na Nain Milaye Re"
- Miss Coca Cola -
  - "Jeena Hai Kya"
  - "Kabhi Kabhi Mere Dil"
  - "Zara Humse Nigahen Mila"
  - "Jhuka Jhukake Nigahen Milayi Jati Hai" with Mukesh
- Musafir Khana -
  - "Palti Are Palti Palti Kismat Palti"
  - "Agar Babu Dil Hai Kabu, Toh Dar Nahi Tu"
  - "Zara Si Baat Ka Huzur Ne Fasana Kar Diya"
- Naghma-e-Sahara -
  - "Taare Hain Chandni Hain" with Talat Mahmud
  - "Do Shamme Jal Rahi Hai (version 1)" with Talat Mahmud
  - "Do Shamme Jal Rahi Hai (version 2)" with Talat Mahmud
- Naqab -
  - "Meri Kasam Tumhen, Nera Yeh Raaz"
  - "Khatawar Hoon Gar Khata Batao"
- Navratri -
  - "Sinh Ki Hoonkar Le" with Mohammed Rafi
  - "Ambe Tu Hai Jagadambe Kaali" with Mohammed Rafi
  - "Baharen Aayengi, Hothon Pe Phool Khilegi" with Mohammed Rafi
  - "Nain Khule Toh Dekhe Naina"
  - "Main Toh Chalu Rumjhum"
  - "Dukhiyon Ko Bananewale"
  - "Hum Naariyan Sukumariyan"
  - "Kala Bhanwara Machalne Na De"
- Oonchi Haveli -
  - "Aji Kyun Rooth Gaye" with Shamshad Begum, and Parshuram
  - "Baap Gaaye Thumri" with Mohammed Rafi
  - "Chanda Re Tujhe Dekhe Saara Alam"
  - "Gaaon Gaaon Mein Dhoondh Rahi"
  - "Kiya Tha Paap Kya Maine"
  - "Roop Kaisa Diya Hai Tujhe Raam Ne" with Shivram Krishnan
  - "Sapnon Ki Gaaon Mein" with Shivram Krishnan
- Pehli Jhalak - "Mohabbat Ne Mujhe Maara"
- Prabhu Ki Maya -
  - "Chalo Dene Badhaai Guru Ki Aangan Mein" with Hemant Kumar
  - "Ek Samay Ki Baat" with Hemant Kumar
  - "Ghar Aaye Hamare Muniraaj"
  - "Jogi Jogan Khadi Tere Dwaar"
- Pyaara Dushman -
  - "Yeh Duniya Hai Aani Jaani" with Mohammed Rafi
  - "Kuchh Bolo Zara, Mukh Kholo Zara" with Mohammed Rafi
  - "Jahan Nazren Mili Dil Kho Hi Jaata Hai" with Mohammed Rafi
  - "Abhi Toh Dil Hai Jawaan" with Mohammed Rafi
  - "Dil Leke Dil Ki Duniya Mita Di"
- Raftar -
  - "Rangrejwa Sambhal Kar Rangiyo Re"
  - "Preet Ki Reet Nibhana"
  - "Phir Toh Kaho Ek Baar"
  - "Dil Tamasha Ho Magar"
  - "Chhalke Mann Ki Chhagalwa"
  - "Mohabbat Mein Jeena Hai" with Talat Mahmud
- Railway Platform -
  - "Mast Sham Hai, Hathon Mein Jaam Hai" with S. D. Batish
  - "Bhajo Ram Bhajo Ram" with S. D. Batish
  - "Andher Nagari Chaupat Raja" with Mohammed Rafi, Manmohan Krishna, and Shiv Dayal Batish
- Raj Durbar -
  - "Naachun Chham Chham Tere Darbar Mein"
  - "Bulbul Ka Chaah Chaahna"
- Raj Kanya -
  - "Tasveer Nainan Mein Thi" with Mohammed Rafi
  - "Is Do Rangi Duniya Mein" with Mohammed Rafi
  - "Haathon Se Dil Thaam Ke"
  - "Jab Mohan Bajaaye Murliya Re"
  - "Kaale Nag Nagino Jangal Ki"
  - "Naseeba Ke Hai Maare"
  - "Poochho Poochho Na Dil Ka Haal"
- Rajkumari -
  - "Sundar Mausam Sama Suhana" with Mukesh
  - "Nain Humare Tumhe Bulaaye"
  - "Bezaar Hoon Main Majbooriyon Se"
- Ratna Manjari -
  - "Meri Bawri Chunariya Hawa Mein"
  - "Humein Kyun Bhulaya"
  - "Main Kaisi Rahungi More Raja" with Mohammed Rafi
- Roop Basant -
  - "Mere Do Nain Shikari Hai"
  - "Kahan Ho Duniya Ke Bhagwan"
  - "Ab Naiya Kaise Paar Lage"
  - "Aag Bujha Le O Matwale"
- Rukhsana -
  - "Tumhe Ham Yad Karate Hai"
  - "Tere Jahan Se Chal Diye (female)"
  - "Din Raat Zafayen Karte Hai"
  - "Dil Ko Laga Ke Huzur Hum To Hue Majboor" with Mubarak Begum
  - "Tere Jahaan Se Chal Diye" with Kishore Kumar
  - "Yeh Chaar Din Bahaar Ke" with Kishore Kumar
- Sabse Bada Rupaiya -
  - "Bol Re Munna Duniya Mein Hai Kaun" with Mohammed Rafi, S. Balbir, and Shamshad Begum
  - "Is Raat Diwali Yeh Kaisi" with Mohammed Rafi, and Shamshad Begum
  - "Bananewale Ne Rupaiya Gol Kyun Banaya" with Mohammed Rafi
  - "Sabse Bada Hai Ji" with Mohammed Rafi
  - "Duniya Daulatwalon Ki Hai" with S. Balbir, and Suhasini Kolhapure
  - "Kahe Patanga Deepak Se"
  - "Thodi Der Aur Baitho"
  - "Ae Dil Na Ro Leke Aansu Ke Haar"
- Sakhi Hatim -
  - "Laate Ho Khuda Hafiz"
  - "Be-Sahaaron Ke Nigehbaan"
- Sakhi Lutera -
  - "Tumse Karte Na Agar Pyaar"
  - "Balma Ki Chaal Mein Aa Gayi Main"
- Sardaar -
  - "Aayi Jhoom Ke Jawaani Liye Pyaar"
  - "Jabse Nazar Se Nazar Mili"
  - "Kali Khili Armaan Ki"
  - "Neend Nigodi Ban Gayi Bairan"
- Sati Madalasa -
  - "Sir Par Ganga Rakhnewale"
  - "Patanga Se Pyaar Hai Toh Diya Jalega"
  - "Naache Chham Chham"
  - "Koi Dekhta Rahe Toh Machalti Hoon"
  - "Kuan Sune Hamari Pukaar"
  - "Kamzor Samajhke Gayya Pe Haath Na Uthao"
  - "Rajaji Zara Sambhalo Paayal Ki Boli" with Mohammed Rafi
- Sau Ka Note -
  - "Piya Bin Sakhi Mohe"
  - "Anjaane Mein Kar Gaya Yeh Naina Nadaani"
  - "Sahaare Na Bana Ae Dil"
- Shahi Mehmaan -
  - "Arzoo Tadpi, Muhabbat Haath Mal Kar Reh Gayi"
  - "Aye Sanam Mere Naache Qadam"
  - "Laa Pila Jaam, Pila Milega Tujhko"
  - "Mujhe Meri Kismat Ne Saza Di"
  - "Teer Chalake Jalim Jaana Na!" with Mohammed Rafi
- Shahzada -
  - "Raat Aayi Hai, Ghunghat Nikale Aaja"
  - "Bhalo Ho Tera, O Daaga Denewale"
  - "Aati Hai Mere Saamne" with Mohammed Rafi
- Shiv-Bhakta -
  - "Bhagwan Mil Jaaye Saamne Humko" with Mohammed Rafi
  - "Laaj Laage, Ghunghat Na Khol Baalma" with Mohammed Rafi
  - "Mile Amiri Ya Fakiri Mujhe Dar Kya"
- Shree 420 - "Mud Mud Ke Na Dekh" with Manna Dey
- Shri Krishna Bhakti -
  - "Rimjhim Barsaat Rahe Andhiyari Raat"
  - "Baras Raha Rang Gopiyon Sang Sang"
- Shri Ganesh Vivah -
  - "Panghat Pe Chali Sawaar Gori" with Suman Kalyanpur
  - "Bhagwan Tune Kya Kiya" with Mohammed Rafi
  - "Mere Bhole Piya"
  - "Aangan Mein Khele Laal"
  - "Jai Vandan Girja Ke Nandan"
  - "Bade Bade Akhiyan, Kamal Jaisu Pakhiyan"
  - "Laal Rang Mein Rangi Dhwaja" with Manna Dey
  - "Ashram Kya Tha, Punyalok Tha" with Manna Dey
- Shri Nagad Narayan -
  - "Yeh Muh Masur Ki Daal" with Mohammed Rafi
  - "Aaj Tumhare Charnon Mein" with Mohammed Rafi
  - "Yeh Aaj Gair Ke Ghar Mein"
  - "Kisise Aaj Hamari Mulaqaat Hogi"
  - "Dekh Rahe Ho Tum, Mohabbat Ke Khwab"
  - "Kabhi Yeh Mujhko"
  - "Aye Kismat Tere Sadke"
- Society -
  - "Sharmili Nigahaen Kehti Tum Aaj Nigaahen"
  - "Lehron Mein Jhoolun"
  - "Dil Nahin Toh Na Sahi"
- Tatar Ka Chor -
  - "Dekh Zara Gar Dekh Sake"
  - "Nigaahon Mein Base Aise"
  - "Na Manzil Hai Na Manzil Ki Talash Hai" with Mubarak Begum, and Talat Mahmud
  - "Dekho Zara Ulfat Ka Asar" with Mohammed Rafi
- Tismar Khan -
  - "Yeh Do Jaalim Naina" with S. D. Batish
  - "Tune Dil Leke Mora" with Shaminder Pal
  - "Jigar Koi Thaam Liya"
  - "Dole Re Dole Re Jiya"
  - "Dhoondhti Hai Tujhko Nazar"
- Teen Sardar -
  - "Zindagi Ki Qasam"
  - "O Jaanewale Ji, Basa Le Pyaar Ki Duniya"
  - "Na Jaane Kab Talak"
  - "Koi Hum Sa Qismat Ka Maara Nahi"
  - "Jhoom Le O Mastane"
- Toofan Mail -
  - "Dil Ke Taaron Ko Chhed Gaya"
  - "Mohabbat Hai Jawani Hai"
- Vachan -
  - "Jab Liya Haath Mein Haath" with Mohammed Rafi
  - "Ek Paisa De De O Babu" with Mohammed Rafi
  - "Koi Jahaan Mein Hamari Tarah" with Mohammed Rafi
  - "Chanda Mama Door Ke"
  - "Wo Din Kaha Gaye Mere"
  - "Iss Jahan Mein Humein Aise Jeena Pada"
  - "Yun Hi Chupke Chupke Bahane Bahane"
  - "Zara Sikh Lo Ankhiyo Sharmana"
- Veer Rajputani -
  - "Ab Dekh Ke Kya Kare" with Mohammed Rafi
  - "Mane Bhool Mat Jaao"
  - "O Meri Bagiya Mein"
- Waman Avatar -
  - "Aaja Re Aaja Re Aaja" with A. R. Oza
  - "Jal Jal Jal Re Deepak Jal" with Mohammed Rafi
  - "Main Hoon Taaron Ki Rani"
  - "Ghar Ghar Barso Lakshmi"
  - "Jaa Re Jaa Re Akash Je Raaja"

=== 1956 ===
- 26 January - "Chhod Bhi Dr Aakash Sinhaasan" with Manna Dey
- Aabroo -
  - "Woh Raat Bhi Kya Hogi"
  - "Jo Kal Banaya Tha Ashiyana"
- Aan Baan -
  - "Aji Is Faani Duniya Mein Mohabbat Ke" with Mubarak Begum
  - "Jhum Rahi Hai Zindagi"
  - "Murali Manohar Devaki Nandan"
  - "Mere Dil Me Tum Chupe"
- Alam Ara -
  - "Jaan-e-Nazar Dekh Idhar Husn Mera"
  - "Gulzar Aag Ko Kiya"
  - "Aadmi Ki Is Zamane Me Yahi Pehchan"
  - "Meri Agar Na Tune Suni"
  - "Mohabbat Ke Jalwo Se Roshan Hai Sina"
- Arab Ka Saudagar -
  - "Hai Yeh Duniya Musafirkhana"
  - "Jeene Ka Mazaa Hai"
  - "Ruk Jaao Sanam, Tujhe Meri Kasam"
  - "Idhar Bhi Ek Nazar" with Ravi
  - "Yeh Mehfil Sitaaron Ki" with Hemant Kumar
- Astik -
  - "O Jogi Jog Se Mat Kar Pyaar"
  - "Chhod Ke Duniya Ki Maya Re"
  - "Milan Ki Raat Hai"
- Ayodhyapati -
  - "Aao Sajao Sakhi Phulo Se Palna"
  - "Chamak Cham Cham Ho Raja"
  - "Chanda Sa Mukhda Chupa Ke"
  - "Maya Mahal Raaj Singhasan"
  - "Rani Kyo Barsa Rahi"
- Badshah Salamat -
  - "Kahin Se Woh Parwana"
  - "Yeh Hawa Yeh Ghata Kehte Hain Nazare"
  - "Sitam Oe Sitam Dha Raha Hai Zamana"
- Bandhan - "Hasinon Ke Ankhon Ke Dore Gulabi"
- Basant Bahar -
  - "Kar Gaya Re, Kar Gaya Mujhpe Jaadu" with Lata Mangeshkar
- Basant Panchami -
  - "Badal Pe Madal Baaje" with Kavi Pradeep
  - "Raajon Ke Bhi Maharaj" with Kavi Pradeep
  - "Bahut Dinon Par Mile Ho Prabhu Pyaare"
  - "O Muraliwale O Gokul Wale Gwale"
  - "Lete Jaao Re Prabhu Ka Naam Thoda"
  - "He Chakra Sudarshan Wale"
  - "Aa Meri Taqdeer Mein"
  - "Auron Ki Ankhiyan Jaane Na"
  - "Piye Jaao Maine Bhagwan Zehar Ka Pyala"
  - "Koi Jadu Hai Tum Me Zarur"
- Basre Ki Hoor -
  - "Zara Tham Jaana, Zara Ruk Jaana"
  - "Dil Si Nazuk Cheez Ko Tum Agar"
  - "Pyar Bhara Dil Hai Tere Hawale"
  - "Aaye Hai Dil Bechne Husn Ki Sarkar Mein"
  - "Mara Teere Mohabbat Mara Paar Jigar"
- Bhagam Bhag -
  - "Hame Koyi Gum Hai" with Mohammed Rafi
  - "Chale Ho Kaha Karake Ji Bekarar" with Mohammed Rafi
  - "Tere Teer-e-Nazar Ka Balam" with Mohammed Rafi
  - "E Ji Jaane Jigar Tum Chale Ho Kidhar"
  - "Chhalake Chanda Ka Paimana"
  - "Ye Duniya Fani Hai Aani Jaani Hai"
- C.I.D. - "Leke Pehla Pehla Pyaar (part 2)" with Mohammad Rafi, and Shamshad Begum
- Chaand -
  - "Yeh Dharti Hai Balidaan Ki" with Sudha Malhotra
- Chandrakanta -
  - "Kismat Agar Hai Saath Tumhare"
  - "Mast Hokar Zara Jhum Le"
  - "Ji Chahta Hai Aaj Kahi Dur Jayiye" with Mohammed Rafi
  - "Zindagi Tang Hai Mere Shero Utho" with Mohammed Rafi
- Char Minar -
  - "Chhup Chhup Jaana Re, Kar Ke Bahanaa"
  - "Jaayen Kahan Jaalim Jahan"
- Chhoo Mantar -
  - "Main To Banke Naino Wali" with Mohammed Rafi
  - "Aaja Re Aaja Na Sata Re Piya"
- Chori Chori - "Mann Bhavan Ke Ghar Jaye Gori" with Lata Mangeshkar
- Dashera -
  - "Kaam Pada Hai Aaj Tera O Ladle"
  - "Baitha Prabhu Aakash Pe"
  - "Is Prithvi Patal Gagan Ka"
  - "O Mere Kul Ke Taranhar Kunwar Chelaiya Re (Happy)"
  - "O Mere Kul Ke Taranhar Kunwar Chelaiya Re (Sad)"
- Delhi Durbar - "Jaam-e-Mohabbat Laayi Hoon"
- Devta -
  - "Phoolon Ke Mele"
- Dhake Ki Malmal -
  - "Behta Paani Behta Jaaye" with Kishore Kumar, and Manna Dey
  - "Kuch Kuch Hone Laga, Mera Dil Khone Laga" with Shamshad Begum
  - "Kadar More Jaane Na" with Shamshad Begum
  - "Preetam Jab Aan Milenge"
  - "Jadugar Sanwariya, Aisi Tan Sunai Tune"
  - "Ab To Tum Sang Naina Laage"
  - "More Man Mein Uthe Hai Pyar"
- Dhola Maru -
  - "Ae Ji Mori Far Far Ankhiyan Farke"
  - "Le Lo Le Lo Le Lo Ji"
  - "Sun Sun Mori Gaural Mat"
  - "Aaj Ki Ye Bate Bhool Mat Jayiyo Ji" with Manna Dey
  - "Ek Samay Dushyant The Bhaarat Ke Samraat" with Manna Dey
  - "Suno Suno Nagri Ke Logo" with Manna Dey
- Diwali Ki Raat -
  - "Aa Ha Ha Ha Deewali"
  - "Tohot Gaya Dil Ab Kya Gaaoon"
  - "Jeevan Veena Ki Jab Chhede Man Ke"
  - "Pyaar Ka Mara Pyaar Kare Ya Doob Mare" with Talat Mahmud, and Moti Sagar
- Do Shehzaade -
  - "armaan Tadap Kar Jeh Rhae Hai"
  - "Abhi Toh Hum Jawaan Hai"
  - "Zindagi Ke Saj Par Naghma-e-Bahaar Gaa"
- Durgesh Nandini -
  - "Raat Andheri Dar Laage Yaki Mori"
  - "Kaise Main Aaun Piya Paas Tumhare"
- Dwarikadheesh -
  - "Maine Mehandi Rachayi Re Krishan Naam Ki"
  - "Dukh Se Harungi Nahi Main, Pukaarungi Nahin"
  - "Naam Na Prabhu Ka Meet Sake"
  - "O Sakhi Jamuna Kinare"
  - "Tarse Ankhiya Daras Ko" with Manna Dey
- Ek Hi Rasta -
  - "Kaisi Lagi Jaaye To Jaaye Jiya" with Usha Mangeshkar
  - "Bade Bhaiya Laaye Hain"
- Ek Shola -
  - "Chanda Se Bhi Pyara Hai" with Geeta Dutt
  - "Kahin Chal Na De, Raat Ka Kya Thikana" with Mohammed Rafi
  - "Jaadugar Tune Kaisa Jaadu Ye Kiya"
  - "Chudi Chhanke Chalu Mai Jab Tanke"
  - "Habba Ho Re Hayya"
  - "Jhum Ke Man Matwala Mera"
- Funtoosh -
  - "Jo Dekhen Woh Unki Inayat" with Kishore Kumar
  - "Humein Kisi Pe Dore Dalne Hai" with Kishore Kumar
  - "Phul Gendwa Na Maro"
  - "Pyar Ne Kitne Sapne Dekhe"
  - "Johnny Ji Ne Me Kya Hai"
- Gauri Puja -
  - "Chale Aao Re Luteri"
  - "Kabhi Bhulo Jo Apni Dagariya Pe"
  - "Main Teri Kangal Pujaran"
  - "Panghat Pe Jaaun Toh Lambi Dagariya"
  - "Jay Bajrang Jay Bajrang, Siyaram Ke Pujari" with Manna Dey
  - "Shehnaiyon Ke Sur Mein Baaji" with Usha Mangeshkar
- Ghulam Begum Badshah - "Aaj Hai Mujhko Khushi"
- Gul-e-Bakawali -
  - "La La Hua Kya Hai Bataa Tu"
- Guru Ghantal -
  - "Zindagi Ka Sahara Jaata Raha"
  - "Hum Aapke Hain, Humse Parda Na Kijiye" with Mohammed Rafi
  - "O Jaanewale Salamat Jawani Teri"
  - "Dil-e-Gham Naseeb Ki Dastaan"
  - "Bheeni Bheeni Chandni, Bheege Mera Dil"
- Halaku - "Aji Chale Aao" with Lata Mangeshkar
- Hamara Watan -
  - "Zara Sambhal Ke O Deewane"
  - "Ankhon Ko Yeh Allah Ka Jalwa"
  - "Zameen Aasman Jab Hau Dushman Hamare"
  - "Meri Zindagi Mein Koi Aa Gaya"
  - "Tum Jo Mile O Sanam" with Hemant Kumar
  - "Yeh Shokh Sitaare Karte Hain Ishaare" with Hemant Kumar
  - "Pyaar Ka Zamana Hai"
  - "Jo Dekhe Pyaar Se Koi"
- Ham Sab Chor Hain -
  - "O Mr Benjo, Ishara To Samjho" with Mohammed Rafi
  - "Bhool Ja Ae Dil Pyar Ke Woh Din"
  - "Gudiya Tere Raaj Me Baje Baja"
  - "Beimaan Balma, Gayi Jaan Jaalma"
  - "Wo Baat Jispe Ki Dhadke Jiya"
  - "Tere Aage Bolna Dushwar Ho Gaya"
  - "Tum Hamse Kyun Darta Hai"
- Harihar Bhakti -
  - "Teri Kaisi Anokhi Hai Chaal"
  - "Main Laajwanti Hoon Naar"
- Hatimtai -
  - "Jhoomta Hai Dil, Jhoomta Hai Nazar" with Mohammed Rafi
  - "Dil Kispe Aa Gaya Hai Tumhara" with Mubarak Begum
- Heer -
  - "Khamosh Zamana Hai" with Mohammed Rafi
  - "Chhedi Maut Ne Shahnayi Aaja Aane Wale"
  - "Jalaa Ke Khaak Na Kar Du"
- Hotel - "Muhabbat Ka Meri Hai Itna Fasana"
- Husn Banoo -
  - "Ya Nabi Salaam Alaika"
  - "Pyaar Karne Ka Aaya Zamana"
  - "Sambhal Kar Baithana"
- Indar Sabha -
  - "Bas Mein Taqdeer Nahin" with Mohammed Rafi
  - "Chhalla De Diya" with Mohammed Rafi
  - "Laala Laaa Gune Laala Pyaar Kare Hain" with Geeta Dutt
  - "Kashti Nooh Ko Toofan Se Bachaya Tune"
  - "Sanam Badnaam"
  - "Laut Aayi Basant Bahaar"
  - "Qismat Par Humein Hai Bharosa"
  - "Sanam Tum Deewane Kiske"
- Indra Leela -
  - "Sun Lo Jiya Ki Baat"
  - "Sun Le Mamta Ki Dhun Kaliyan"
  - "Tu Baadal Ka Bajaa Mrudang"
  - "Yamuna Ke Teere Sakhi Bajte Manzire"
  - "Parbar Hat Jaa, Dharti Phat Jaa"
  - "Aaj Naam Ki Laaj Ganwaate Tujhko"
- Insaaf -
  - "Mast Raat Hai, Tu Bhi Saath Hai"
  - "Kahin Toh Phool Khushi Ke"
  - "Dil Pe Nazar Hai"
  - "Do Dil Dhadak Rahe Hai" with Talat Mahmud
- Inspector -
  - "Mere Nainon Ki"
  - "Dekho Kaisi Suhani"
  - "Na Poochho Ki Kiski"
  - "Bada Mushkil Hai"
- Jagte Raho - "Thandi Thandi Sawan Ki Phuhar"
- Jallad -
  - "Dil Ke Phaphole Jal Uthe"
  - "Kya Baat Hui Ab Tak Deewabe Nahin Aaya"
  - "Main Gale Lag Jaaun Toh Aag Lag Jaaye"
  - "Husn Yahan Ishq Yahan" with Mohammed Rafi
- Jayshree -
  - "Bahaaron Ne Phoolon De Maara"
  - "Maarun Naina Baan Se"
  - "Mausam Hai Taaza Taaza"
- Kaarwan -
  - "Bigda Naseeb Kaun Sanware Tera"
  - "Dekh Le Is Jahan Mein Dil Laga Ke"
  - "O Dilwale Hans Le Gaa Le"
  - "Ya Rab Meri Bigdi Hui Taqdeer Bana De"
- Kala Chor -
  - "Bas Yeh Kasoor Kiya Hai"
  - "Dil Tera Hua Hai Ab Tera"
  - "Yeh Hawaayen Yeh Jhoomti Ghatayen"
  - "Main Bhi Jaanun, Tu Bhi Jaane"
  - "Chori Chori Chandni Hai Ab Tera"
- Kar Bhala -
  - "Ui Mere Allah, Kaun Aaya Saamne"
  - "Salaamu Alaika"
  - "O Mere Zindagi Ke Sahaare" with Mohammed Rafi
  - "O Dilruba Aa Nazar Mila" with Mohammed Rafi
  - "Dilwale Bhala Kar Bhala" with Mohammed Rafi
  - "Deewane Agar Magar Kaahe Soche" with Mohammed Rafi
- Kismat -
  - "Chand Raat Hai Tu Bhi Saath Hai" with Mohammed Rafi
  - "Haseen Raat Sitaro Se Hua Karti Hai"
  - "Dil Me Kisi Ki Chah Kiye Ja"
  - "Ek Jadugar Wo Hai"
  - "Keh Le Dil Ki Baat Warna"
  - "Ye Sama Ye Chandani Ek Teri Thi Kabhi"
- Kismet Ka Khel - "Chalo Le Chalu Main Taaron Mein"
- Lal-e-Yaman -
  - "Arzoo Lene Laagi Angdaiyan"
  - "O Bhole Bhale Nazren Mila Le"
  - "Yeh Chand Yeh Sitare" with Mohammed Rafi
  - "Ae Besakon Ki Ankh Ke Taare Salaam Le"
- Mem Sahib -
  - "Kehta Hai Dil Tum Ho Mere Liye" with Talat Mahmud
  - "Hamari Gali Aana Achha Ji" with Talat Mahmud
  - "Dil Dil Se Mila Kar Dekho"
  - "Ishq Ik Zahar Sahi"
  - "Pyar Ki Ghadiyan Gin Gin Gin"
  - "Chuni Muni Chuniya Oye"
- Mr. Chakram -
  - "Ek Gham Ka Din Bhi Gaya"
  - "Jao Jao Balam Harjai"
  - "Nainon Se Nain Mile"
  - "Umangon Ki Din Hain"
  - "Sheeshe Se Gulaabi Dhalte Ho"
  - "Yeh Dil Ki Dhadkanon Se"
- Mr. Lambu -
  - "Kahan Jaate Ho"
  - "Kaise Kaise Teer Chalaye"
  - "Kitne Sitam Kitne Hi Gham"
- Naqab Posh -
  - "Ae Raat Tere Saath Hai"
  - "O Dilwale Apna Bana Le"
- Naya Aadmi -
  - "Athanni Jahan Amma"
  - "Main Toh Ganga Jamuna Ki Tata Gayi"
- Naya Andaz - "Yeh Raat Ashiqana, Chhaya Sama Suhana" with Mohammed Rafi
- Noor-e-Yaman -
  - "Tere Chand Sa Mukhda Jab Dekha"
  - "Har Gayi Re Main Toh"
  - "Bhari Mehfil Hain Aur Daman Hain Khali"
  - "Hum Tumse Muhabbat Karte Hain" with Mohammed Rafi
- Paisa Hi Paisa -
  - "Le Lo Sone Ki Laddu" with Lata Mangeshkar, and Kishore Kumar
  - "Bas Ek Tum Bin Kal Na Pade" with Lata Mangeshkar, and Kishore Kumar
  - "Uf Na Karna Ki Muhabbat Meri" with Mohammed Rafi
  - "Dil Ne Maanga Pyaar" with Kishore Kumar, and Mohammed Rafi
- Panna -
  - "Rajaji More Man Ki Paayal"
  - "Main Bansari Tumhari"
  - "Dil Kya Badla, Duniya Badli" with Rekh Sibnis
- Parivar -
  - "Bawali Bana Ke Chhoda Haye Teri Preet Ne"
  - "Ek Do Teen" with Hemant Kumar
- Ram Navami -
  - "Aaja Re Aaja Mere Ram Baghurai"
  - "Chali Re Chali, Main Toh Chali Re"
  - "Kha Lo Meethe Meethe Ber"
  - "Main Maang Rahi Hoon Jwala"
  - "Patiyan Seekh Lo Re"
  - "Baaje Gagariya Pe Taal" with Mohammed Rafi, and S. Balbir
  - "Tunak Tunak Bole Mera Ektaara" with Kavi Pradeep
  - "Dhanya Shaadi Shubh Aayi" with Mohammed Rafi
- Roop Kumari -
  - "Raat Chandni Jiya Jalaye"
  - "Chhanan Chhan Payal Baaje Mori"
  - "Humein Kya Khabar Thi"
  - "O Pardesi, Aao Pardesi Mere Dware"
- Samundari Daku -
  - "Samaan Pyaara Hai, Din Hai Bade Kaam Ke" with S. Balbir
  - "Ho Jaata Hai Pyaar Suno Ji"
  - "Arre Zalim Tu Na Humse Khafaa Hota"
  - "Badi Main Bholi Bhaali O Balamwa"
  - "Dil Jawaan Hai, Arzoo Jawaan" with Talat Mahmud
- Sati Anusuya -
  - "Aaj Kyun Na Karu Main"
  - "Aayi Hai Kaisi Umariya"
  - "Apni Rath Ko Thaam Le"
  - "Naag Devta Ho"
  - "Mausam Ki Raja Ki Aayi Baraat Dekho" with Talat Mahmud
- Sati Naag Kanya -
  - "Thandi Hawayein Maare Jhatke"
  - "O Dinbandhu Kyun So Raha"
  - "Ab Tere Haath Re Aarti"
  - "Kab Tak Chhupega Aasmaan Megh Odh Ke"
- Shatranj -
  - "Kahi Se Shaam Hote Hi"
  - "Baji Kahi Shehnai Aayio Ji"
  - "Jawani Thi Soyi Sapnon Me Khoyi" with C. Ramchandra
- Sheikh Chilli -
- Shirin Farhad -
  - "Mera Aaghaz Shirin Ha" with Hemant Kumar
  - "Ae Dilruba Jaanewafa Tere Siwa Kon Hai Mera" with Hemant Kumar
  - "Reh Reh Ke Dil Yeh Pukaare"
- Shrimati 420 - "Main Dhoondhti Hoon Kahan Ho Sanam" with Mohammed Rafi
- Sipahsalar -
  - "Ek Anaar Aur Sau Bimaar"
  - "Dil Ne Chheda Hai Tarana" with Talat Mahmud
  - "Ankhon Mein Ankhen Daal Ke" with Mohammed Rafi
- Sudarshan Chakra -
  - "Nartak Anek, Natraj Ek"
  - "Mujhe Mushkil Mein Daale"
  - "Mere Roop Ka Jawab Tere Paas"
  - "Bheeni Bheeni Raat Chhayi"
  - "Koi Din Mein Aake Kare Mujhse Mulaqat"
  - "Aaya Insan"
- Sultan-e-Alam -
  - "Aaja Aaja Ki Mere Dil Ki Duniya Tujhe Pukare (version 1)"
  - "Aaja Aaja Ki Mere Dil Ki Duniya Tujhe Pukare (version 2)"
- Talwar Ka Dhani -
  - "Aaj Laakhon Ka Sauda"
  - "Deewana Ban Ke Kuchh Na Milega"
  - "Neend Na Aayi Raja"
  - "Ankhiyan Mila Dil Mein Sama"
  - "Suraj Dekhe Chanda Dekhe"
- Tankhah -
  - "Daata Teri Daya Ka Jisko Mila Sahara"
  - "Meri Kashti Jahan Mein Doobi"
  - "So Jaa D-e-Nashaad"
  - "Takrayi Hai Jis Din Se Nazar"
  - "Mushkilon Se Ladna Mera Kaam Hai"
- Yahudi Ki Beti -
  - "Paayal Na Jaane Kya Boli"
  - "Yeh Pyaar Bhara Dil Hai" with Hemant Kumar
  - "Pyaar Ka Jab Paimaane Chhalak Raha"
  - "Tera Teer Nazar O Sanam Bekhabar"
- Zarina -
  - "Dekho Woh Chand So Gaya Hai" with Mohammed Rafi
  - "Tu Hi Tu"
  - "Mere Dil Mein Teri Arzoo"
  - "Safeena Bachao" with Manna Dey
- Zindagi -
  - "Vrindavan Se Jadi Mangayi" with Usha Mangeshkar, and S. Balbir
  - "Lehraye Chunariya Taaron Ki"
- Zindagi Ke Mele -
  - "Than Thana Than Pe Saari Duniya Dole Re" with Usha Mangeshkar
  - "Leke Jiya Dole Piya"

=== 1957 ===
- Aasha -
  - "So Jaa Re Chanda"
  - "Eena Meena Deeka"
- Ab Dilli Dur Nahin -
  - "Yeh Chaman Hamara Apna Hai" with Geeta Dutt
  - "Lo Har Cheez Le Lo" with Geeta Dutt
  - "Raghupati Raghav Raja Ram" with Geeta Dutt, and Shamshad Begum
- Abhimaan -
  - "Akdo Na Humse Piya"
  - "Sambhalo Palla Dori Palla" with Anil Biswas
  - "Chali Jawani Thokar Khane" with Mohammed Rafi
- Agra Road -
  - "Suno Sunaaye Tumhen Aaj Ek Chhoti Kahani"
  - "Suno Sunaaye Tumhen Aaj Ek Chhoti Kahani (sad)"
- Amar Singh Rathaur -
  - "Main Hoon Akeli, Sang Na Saheli"
  - "Jaan Na Pehchan, Ghar Aaye Mehmaan"
  - "O Dilwalo Baitho Sambhal" with Sudha Malhotra
- Apradhi Kaun? -
  - "Baat Koi Matlab Ki Hai Zaroor"
  - "Tere Dil Se Mere Dil Ka Abhi Hona Hai Faisala"
  - "Koi Dekhe To Kahe Tujhko Kahi"
- Arpan -
  - "Jogiya Tohse Naina Lagaake Pachhtayi"
  - "Deepak Se Deepak Jal Gaye"
  - "Mann Ki Kaa Se Kahoon"
  - "Raat Je Pichhale Phaharon Mein"
  - "Roun Main Gin Gin Taare"
  - "Lo Chori Pakdi Gayi" with Meena Mangeshkar, Usha Mangeshkar, and Sudha Malhotra
- Baarish -
  - "Mr John Ya Baba Khan"
  - "Hum To Jani Pyaar Karega" with C. Ramchandra
- Bada Bhai -
  - "Chori Chori Dil Ka Lagana Buri Baat Hai" with Talat Mahmud
  - "Hello Hello Hyderabadi"
  - "Ho Saiyan Jadu Dar Gaye"
  - "Kare Jo Dur Mushkile"
  - "O Babu Zara Dekhta Ja"
  - "Bhagwan Bhagat Binaa Tu"
  - "Sakhi Chhed Kare Nand"
- Bade Sarkar -
  - "Jawani Jhumti Hai Dulhan"
  - "Jab Hum Tum Dono Raazi To"
  - "Ankhiyon Ke Nur"
- Bandi - "Kaahe Sharmaaye Gori, Din Yeh Suhaana Hai"
- Bansari Bala -
  - "Sapno Me Aane Wale Nindiya Churane Wale"
  - "Main Toh Bani Re Jogan Unki"
  - "Chhup Chhup Ankhen Roye Humari"
- Bhakta Dhruva -
  - "Mera Lal Bane Mahipal"
  - "O Udte Panchi Aa Re"
  - "Bhagwan Meri Naav Laga De Tu Kinare"
  - "Tu Sagar Main Lehar Hoon"
- Chamak Chandni -
  - "Bata Do Zara Sakhiyo Ri Mere"
  - "Bolo Bolo Dev Hamare"
- Chandi Puja -
  - "Bachpan Hua Khatam Haye Lagne Lagi"
  - "Dig Daiya Chali Meri Naiya"
- Chhote Babu - "Ek Gadi Idhar Se Hamari Chali" with Shamshad Begum
- Dekh Kabira Roya -
  - "Mere Beena Tum Bin Roye" with Lata Mangeshkar
  - "Hum Bulate Hi Rahe" with Mohammed Rafi
  - "Ashqon Se Teri Humne Tasveer Banayi Hai"
- Duniya Rang Rangeeli -
  - "Woh Jo Chahnewale Hai Tere Sanam" with Mohammed Rafi
  - "Tujhko Na Koi Gham" with Mohammed Rafi
  - "Saiyan Kyun Aayi Mujhe Angdayi" with Mohammed Rafi
  - "Saiya Saiya Chhod De Mori Bahiya"
  - "Are Mera Balam Kitna Zalam"
  - "Wo Jo Chahne Wale Hai Tere Sanam (female)"
- Dushman -
  - "Aji Loot Liya Dil Ko Bahane Karke" with Mohammed Rafi
  - "Bahaar Aayi Ghata Chayi"
  - "Dhake Ki Malmal Mangana Balam Ji"
  - "Tikhe Hai Nainva Ke Ban Ji" with S. D. Batish
- Ek Gaon Ki Kahani - "Kanha Kunda Langda Loola"
- Ek Jhalak -
  - "Ye Hansta Hua Karvaan Zindagi Ka" with Hemant Kumar
  - "Baharen Bhi Dekhi, Nazare Bhi Dekhe" with Hemant Kumar
  - "Chal Badalon Se Aage" with Hemant Kumar
  - "O Jal Mein Rehnewali" with Hemant Kumar
  - "Aaya Kaun Meri Mehfil Mein"
- Ek Saal - "Tu Jiye Hazaron Saal Gori"
- Fashion -
  - "Naya Naya Fashion, Naya Hai Zamana"
- Garma Garam -
  - "Garam Garam Garama Garam Jeb Ho Garam" with Mohammed Rafi
  - "Bade Door Se Layi Hoon" with S. D. Batish
  - "Mere Saiyan Ne Diye Mujhe"
  - "Aaye Hai Dware Tihare Hum"
  - "Suno Suno Suno Ri Aaj"
  - "Humko To Mohabbat Hai" with Shamshad Begum, Mohammed Rafi, and S. D. Batish
- Gateway of India -
  - "Jalwa Jo Dekha Tera Humne" with Usha Mangeshkar, Meena Mangeshkar, and Shamshad Begum
  - "Do Ghadi Woh Jo Paas Aa Baithe" with Mohammed Rafi
- Hum Panchhi Hai Ek Daal Ke -
  - "Suno Suno Re Kahani Ek Bahut Puraani" with Shamshad Begum
  - "Mee Ho Maratha, Hu Chho Gujrati (version 2)" with Suman Kalyanpur
  - "Lo Chip Gaya Chand, Bahe Hawa Mand Mand"
  - "Suno Suno Re Kahaani, Ek Bhut Purani (solo)"
  - "Ek Se Bhale Do Do Se Bhale Chaar"
  - "Hum Panchhi Ek Daal Ke (version 2)"
  - "Pooja Ke Do Phul Chadhakar"
- Jahazi Lutera -
  - "Masti Bhari Hi Raat Sanam"
  - "Allah Nigaahwan, Safar Hai Zindegaani" with Manna Dey
- Jasoos -
  - "Yehi Anjaam Hun Jaison Ka" with Manna Dey
  - "Matlabi Yaar Kiske" with Manna Dey
  - "Babu Zara Bachna Duniya Mithi Kataar"
  - "Hai Dil Ke Kale Ye Zalim Duniyawale"
  - "Tum Kahe Ko Neha Lagaye Sajan"
  - "Haye Barjori"
- Johnny Walker -
  - "Thandi Thandi Hawa" with Geeta Dutt
  - "Jhuki Jhuki Pyar Ki Nazar" with Geeta Dutt
  - "Beikhtiyar Hoke, Pyar Ka Shikar Hoke" with Mohammed Rafi
- Kitna Badal Gaya Insaan -
  - "Gori Chali Piya Ke Saath Mila Ke Haath" with Hemant Kumar
  - "Hasinon Ka Bura Ho Jo Hame Barbaad Karte Hai" with Shamshad Begum, Bande Hasan, and Mohammed Rafi
  - "Pade Hai Aag Ke Sholon Mein"
  - "Jab Ladti Hai Nigahen, Dil Hota Hai Deewana"
- Laxmi -
  - "Aao Gori Suno Karo Na Inkar Ji" with Manna Dey
  - "Meri Bholi Bhali Rani" with Manna Dey
  - "Reti Me Kyo Mahal Banaya" with Manna Dey
  - "Nacho O Duniya Nach Rahi"
- Maharani -
  - "Main Bhi Pagal, Tu Bhi Pagal"
  - "Aa Jaye Phir To Ek Dil"
  - "Chanda Pe Jawani Ha"
- Mai Baap -
  - " Dil To Razaamand Hai"
  - "Bhatak Gayi Kis Raah"
  - "Gaalon Pe Tere Gori Rangat Nayi"
- Mehfil -
  - "Mere Dil Ki Lagi Tujhko Bhi Lag Jaye"
  - "Pyara Mukhda Ho Behki Behki Chaal"
- Mera Salaam -
  - "Unhe Dil Ne Pukara Hai"
  - "Dil Unko De Aaye Unhe Aankho Me Rakh Laye"
  - "Ek Lafz Ishq Tha Ki Jo Afsana Ban Gaya"
  - "Bale Bale Bale Bale Bulbule"
  - "Hasin Chaand Sitaaron Kaa Vaasta" with Talat Mahmud
  - "Husn Kehte Hai Mujhe Noor Ka Shola" with Talat Mahmud
- Mirza Sahiban - "Aaj Tukde Huye Mere Dil Ke"
- Miss Mary -
  - "Sakhi Ri Sun Bole Papiha" with Lata Mangeshkar
- Mohini -
  - "Chhup Chhup Ke Dil Ki Dhadkanon Mein"
  - "Dil Ke Karib Aa Gaye Dekha Jo Door Se"
  - "Kahan Karti Hai Duniya Mera Nanha Chand Jaisa Hai"
  - "Taqdeer Ki Thokar Aisi"
  - "Nainon Me Jhume Hai Pyar"
  - "Rehta Hai Tera Naam"
- Mother India - "Dukh Bhare Din Beete Re Bhaiya" with Mohammed Rafi, Manna Dey, and Shamshad Begum
- Mr. X -
  - "Kitna Haseen Hai Jahaan, Jaadubhara Hai Samaa"
  - "Beech Bhare Bazaar Karenge Unse Ankhen Char"
- Naag Lok -
  - "Yeh Kaisi Bijli Giri"
  - "Aas Liye Aakhir Kailasi"
  - "Shankar Bhole Bhaale" with Mohammed Rafi
- Naag Mani -
  - "Jaanewali Dulhan Khushi Khushi Jaana" with Usha Mangeshkar
  - "Aaj Kisi Ki Bujhi Huyi"
  - "Kisi Ke Do Chumkte Nayan"
  - "Mera Rath Chale Chatpat Dauda Jaaye"
  - "Yeh Hai Pataal Ki Duniya Naagon" with Manna Dey
- Narsi Bhagat -
  - "Sab Ki Naiya, Paar Lagaiya" with Manna Dey
  - "Akhil Brahmand Mein" with Manna Dey
- Nau Do Gyarah[10] -
  - "Kali Ke Roop Mein" with Mohammad Rafi
  - "Aaja Panchhi Akela Hai" with Mohammad Rafi
  - "Kya Ho Phir Jo Din Rangeela Ho" with Geeta Dutt
  - "Aankhon Mein Kya Ji" with Kishore Kumar
  - "Dhalki Jaaye Chunariya Hamari"
  - "Jaane Jigar Haye Haye"
- Nausherwan-e-Adil -
  - "Mere Dard-e-Jigar Ki Har Dhadkan" with Zohrabai Ambalewali, and Chandbala
  - "Yeh Nazaqat, Yeh Aalam Shabab"
- Neelofar -
  - "Yeh Habiba Nazuk Bhaar Hoon Main"
  - "Tere Darbar Mein"
- Naya Daur

| "Maang Ke Saath Tumhaara" -

  - "Maang Ke Saath Tumhaara" with Mohammad Rafi
  - "Uden Jab Jab Zulfein Teri" with Mohammad Rafi
  - "Saathi Haath Badhana" with Mohammad Rafi
  - "Reshmi Salwar Kurta Jaali Ka" with Shamshad Begum
  - "Ek Deewana Aate Jaate"
- Pak Daman -
  - "Jahaan Wale Garibon Ki Tu Hi Bigdi"
  - "Pyaar Ki Chandni Leke Raat Aayegi"
  - "Sun Dard Bhari Faryaad"
- Paristan -
  - "Ankho Ko Chaar Kar Ke"
  - "Chandni Muskura Rahi Hai"
  - "Hanste Hai Chand Tare"
  - "Tera Hi Sahara Hai Zamane Mein"
  - "Qamar Bandhe Huye"
  - "Mere Dil Se Aate Hai Yeh Sada"
- Parvin -
  - "Sajan Rasiya Se, Balam Chhalia Se"
  - "Kaahe Ko Laaye More Kangana"
  - "Pakad Liya Aanchal Marodi"
  - "Nashe Mein Hamen Koi Yaad Aa Raha Hai"
  - "Gar Naqab Ulta Toh"
- Patal Pari -
  - "Kya Kya Khel Dikhaye Kayamat Dhaye" with Mubarak Begum
  - "Haal-e-Dil Apna Suna Loon"
  - "Nigah Nichi Kiye"
- Pawan Putra Hanuman[10] -
  - "Piya Piya Piya Tu Bol Re Papiha"
  - "Din Tarana, Tandin Tarana" with Usha Mangeshkar
- Paying Guest[10] -
  - "O Nigahen Mastana" with Kishore Kumar
  - "Chhod Do Aanchal" with Kishore Kumar
- Qaidi -
  - "Chhaya Hai Sama, Mera Dil Hai Jawaan" with Mohammad Rafi
  - "Yu Muskura Ke Samne Aaya Na" with Mohammad Rafi
  - "Bedardi Preet Nahi Jaani" with Usha Mangeshkar
  - "Kuchh To Aisi Baat Kar Zalim"
  - "Humse Bhi Aate Jaate Ankh Milana"
  - "Ho Saiya Ja Ja Mai Teri Baat Kabhi"
  - "Chahe Tu Na Bata Mujhe Sab Hai Pata"
- Sati Pariksha -
  - "Hum Gwaal Baalgopal (version 1)"
  - "Hum Gwaal Baalgopal (version 2)"
  - "Aaya Hai Mausam Suhana"
  - "Aaj Laaj Sankat Mein Meri"
  - "Laut Jaa Naagan, O Ri Suhaagan"
  - "Naagan Ka Sansar Yehi Hai"
  - "O Chanda Ruk Jaa"
  - "Ore Pardesiya More Man Basiya"
  - "Keh Do Koi Taqdeer Ke Dhokhe Mein"
  - "Kismat Bhi Khela Karti Hai"
- Sharada -
  - "O Chand Jahan Woh Jaaye" with Lata Mangeshkar
  - "Aaju Re, Dil Men Hai Laagi Mere"
  - "Aa Lehraye Jiya, Balkhaye Jiya"
  - "Bhagwaan Zara Dhire Bol" with Shamshad Begum, Kamal Barot, and Chandbala
  - "Acha Hai Mauka Kisne Hai Roka" with C. Ramchandra
- Shahi Bazar -
  - "Dil Mastaane Jhoom Le"
  - "Ae Khuda Tere Sahare Jee Rahe Hain" with Mohammed Rafi
- Shehzadi -
  - "Aurat Bhukhi Pyar Ki"
  - "Kali Ghata Aayi Jhoom Ke"
- Sheroo -
  - "Gore Gore Badalon Pe Hoke Sawar" with Talat Mahmud
  - "Kaise Samjhaun Piya Tumko"
- Suvarna Sundari - "Sar Pe Matki, Akhiyan Bhatki"
- Taj Poshi -
  - "Badli Mein Chand Chhupa"
  - "Dil Dhadkne Laga Sharmayi Nazar"
  - "Nazren Bachana Kaisa Ji"
- Talash -
  - "Raat Hai Sitaro Wali Pyar Ke Nazaro Wali"
  - "Are Meri Nazar Ka Teri Nazar Se Hua Samana Re" with C. Ramchandra
- Tumsa Nahin Dekha -
  - "Dekho Kasam Se" with Mohammad Rafi
  - "Sar Par Topi Laal" with Mohammad Rafi
  - "Ye Mast Mast Bin Piye" with Mohammad Rafi
  - "Aaye Hain Dur Se, Milane Hazur Se" with Mohammad Rafi
  - "Yun Toh Humne Lakhon Haseen Dekhe Hai (female)"
- Ustad -
  - "Kiske Liye Bekarar Gori Aaj Tera Pyar" with Mohammed Rafi
  - "Bedardi Beimaan Natkhat Saanwariya" with Sudha Malhotra
  - "Soja Mere Raaj Dulare"
  - "Yeh Sama Phir Kahan Aa Bhi Jaa"
- Yahudi Ki Ladki -
  - "Yeh Chand Bata Kabhi Tume Pyaar Kiya Hai"
  - "Dil Bekaraar Mera, Kare Intezaar Tera" with Hemant Kumar
- Zamana -
  - "Chale Bajate Seeti Jeevan Ki Raaho Mein"
  - "Badal Jaye Duniya"
  - "Ulajh Jaye Naina Toh Kaun"

=== 1958 ===
- Aakhri Daao -
  - "Hamsafar Sath Apna Chhod Chale" with Mohammed Rafi
  - "Haay Unki Wo Nigahe"
  - "Na Dar Sanam Laga Bhi Le"
  - "Tu Hi Aake Sambhal Ise"
- Adalat -
  - "Zamin Se Hamen Aasamaan Par Bithaa Ke" with Mohammed Rafi
  - "Jab Din Hasin Dil Ho Jawan" with Mohammed Rafi
  - "Ja Ja Re Ja Sajna (solo)"
  - "Ja Ja Re Ja Sajna (duet)" with Lata Mangeshkar
  - "Dupatta Mera Malmal Ka" with Geeta Dutt
- Aji Bas Shukriya -
  - "Hone Lagaa Ye Dil Men Dard Kaisa"
  - "Sach Kehta Hai Johnny Walker"
  - "O Data De Hamko Bhi Ek Pyara Bangala" with Mohammed Rafi
  - "Kadaki Tera Hi Naam To Clerky" with Mohammed Rafi
  - "Kya Dhadak Dhadak Dil Dhadke (version 1)" with Usha Khanna
  - "Kya Dhadak Dhadak Dil Dhadke (version 2)"
- Alladin Ka Chirag -
  - "Aau Udke O Raja Tere Dwar"
  - "Karo Na Der Re Ankhiya Na Pher Re"
- Amardeep -
  - "Dekh Hamein Awaaz Na Dena (happy)" with Mohammed Rafi
  - "Dekh Humein Awaaz Na Dena (sad)" with Mohammed Rafi
  - "Is Jahan Ka Pyaar Jhutha" with Manna Dey, and Mohammed Rafi
  - "Yeh Jee Chahta Hai Kisi Din"
  - "Lagi Apni Nazar Katar Banke"
  - "Jali Lo Dim Tana"
  - "Kisi Din Zara Dekh Mera Bhi Hoke"
- Baghi Sipahi -
  - "Sama Ye Pyar Ka" with Manna Dey
  - "Chinchan Pappulu Chhui Mui Mai" with Manna Dey
- Balyogi Upmanyu - "He Bhole Bhagwan"
- Chalti Ka Naam Gaadi -
  - "Main Sitaron Ka Tarana" with Kishore Kumar
  - "Haal Kaisa Hai Janaab Ka" with Kishore Kumar
  - "Hum Hai Tumhare" with Sudha Malhotra
  - "Ruk Jao Na Ji"
- Chalta Purza - "Dil Pe Kaisi Bekhudi Chhane Lagi"
- Chandan -
  - "Jab Thoda Thoda"
  - "Chahe Lakh Zamana Roke"
  - "Sun Radha, Mohan Tera Kala"
- Chandu -
  - "Babuji Mujhe Dil Mein Chhupa Lo"
  - "Do Nain Milakar Matwale" with Agha Sarwar
  - "Bheegi Bheegi Channi Hain" with Mohammed Rafi
- Chaubees Ghante -
  - "Humein Haal-E-Dil Tumse Kehna Hain" with Talat Mahmood
  - "Chhan Chhan Karti Daulat" with Mohammad Rafi
  - "Ek Dil Humare Paas Hain" with Mohammad Rafi
  - "Aaj Ka Salaam Lo"
  - "Haye Kisika Rangin Aanchal"
  - "Nigahein Milake Huyi Main Deewani"
  - "Jawani Jalake Bedardi Raah" with Shamshad Begum
- Detective - "Raahi Chal Sambhal Ke"
- Devar Bhabhi -
  - "Kise Thi Khabar (version 1)"
  - "Kise Thi Khabar (version 2)"
  - "Hazaaron Hasraten"
  - "Ye Kaisi Rut Aayi"
  - "Chori Chhup Jaye Re, Dakaiti Chhup Jaye" with Shamshad Begum
- Dilli Ka Thug -
  - "C A T Cat Mane Billi" with Kishore Kumar
  - "Yeh Raaten, Yeh Mausam, Nadi Ka Kinara" with Kishore Kumar
  - "Seekh Le Babu Pyar Ka Jadu"
  - "Yeh Bahar, Yeh Sama"
  - "Kisi Ka Dil Lena Ho"
- Do Mastane - "Gulon Ka Khilaoon"
- Do Phool -
  - "Bachpan Ka Mora Tora Pyar Suhana" with Lata Mangeshkar
  - "Ruthi Jaye Re Gujariya, Na Bole Re" with Lata Mangeshkar
  - "Kanha Na Chhedo Bansuri Re"
  - "Main Bezuban Hoon Panchhi"
  - "Aayi Pari Rangbhari, Kisne Pukara"
- Dulhan -
  - "I Love You O Madam" with Geeta Dutt
  - "Toh Phir Tumko" with Geeta Dutt
  - "Kaise Jaaun Mai Piya, Mora Maane Na Jiya" with Hemant Kumar
  - "Jiya Sharmaye Nazar Jhuki Jaaye"
  - "Naari Jeevan, Gehra Sagar, Dono Ek Saman"
  - "Dil Na Jala Gham Ko Bhula Ja"
- Farishta -
  - "Jo Waqt Pe Kaam Aa Jaye Aji" with Mohammed Rafi
  - "Meri Ankhiyo Me Ankhiya Na Daal"
  - "Aaj Maine Jana Mera Dil Hai Diwana"
  - "Balam Bada Jhutha, Sajan Bada Jhutha"
  - "Karke Ishara Nera Dil Le Gaya"
- Ghar Grihasthi - "Haye Haye Tera Husn Muradabadi" with Mohammed Rafi
- Gauri Shankar -
  - "Mera Bhola Jogi, Milne Ka Bela Kab Hogi"
  - "Mat Geet Preet Je Gaa"
  - "Sharan Tumhaari Jagat Vidhata"
- Ghar Sansar -
  - "Sapno Ki Dor Bandhi Palko Ka Palna"
  - "Bhabhi Kare Apil Aur Phir Devar Bane Vakil"
  - "Honth Gulaabi Gaal Katore" with Mohammed Rafi
  - "Yeh Hawa Yeh Nadi Ka Kinara" with Manna Dey
- Gopichand -
  - "Haule Haule O Ri Hawa Tu Chal"
  - "Naya Hai Suraj Nayi Hai Kirne"
  - "Pal Bhar Naina Khol Jogi Re"
  - "Rut Aaye Rut Jaye Suhagan"
- Great Show of India -
  - "Aadhi Aadhi Raat Koi Sapno Mein" with Manna Dey
  - "O Jaanewale Maan Bhi Jao"
- Hathkadi -
  - "Mai Jau Kaha Lut Gaya Mera Jahaan"
  - "Ke Chal Diye"
  - "Duniya Hai Badi Zaalim" with Mohammed Rafi
- Howrah Bridge -
  - "Goraa Rang Chunariyaa Kaali" with Mohammed Rafi
  - "Muhabbat Ka Hath Javani Ka Palla" with Mohammed Rafi
  - "Dekh Ke Teri Nazar" with Mohammed Rafi
  - "Aaiye Meherbaan"
  - "Yeh Kya Kar Daala Tune"
- Hum Bhi Kuchh Kam Nahin -
  - "Ye To Hai Mere Diwano Ka Mohalla"
  - "Ja Ja Ja Ja Laut Ja Parwane"
  - "Bachna Pare Pare"
  - "Inquilab Zindabad Inquilab Zindabad"
  - "Sau Hasino Me Koi Ek Hasin"
  - "Jadugarni Chin Ki" with Mohammed Rafi
- Jailor -
  - "Mujhi Mein Chhupkar" with Mohammed Rafi
  - "Meri Hirni Jaisi Chaal (version 1)" with Mohammed Rafi
  - "Meri Hirni Jaisi Chaal (version 2)" with Mohammed Rafi
  - "Pyaar Ki Nishaniyan"
  - "Raggi Pappi Lalli"
- Jisne Tera Naam Liya - "Tere Bina Insaaf Mera Kaun Karega" with Mohammed Rafi
- Kabhi Andhera Kabhi Ujala -
  - "Baahon Ko Zara Lehra De" with Manna Dey
  - "Main Hoon Chanda Si Chhori" with Shamshad Begum
  - "Ajab Hamaree Hai Jindagani"
  - "Ladaye Saiya Naina Toh"
  - "Zara Sone De Balam"
  - "Bhagwan Tujhe Rote Hue Dil Ne Pukara"
  - "Dilo Ka Rishta Hai Aisa Rishta"
- Kala Pani -
  - "Achchha Ji Main Haari" with Mohammed Rafi
  - "O Chhupane Wale Ab Teri" with Mohammed Rafi
  - "Nazar Lagi Raja Tore Bangle Par"
  - "Dil Laga Ke Kidhar Gayi Pyare"
  - "Jab Naam E Mohabbat Le Ke Kisi"
- Kamini - "Koi Barbaad Hota Hai"
- Khazanchi -
  - "Tum Saamne Aakar Jis Dam Jawaani Dikhate Ho" with Mohammed Rafi
  - "Zulam Leke Aaya, Sitam Leke Aaya"
  - "Aayi Diwali Aayi Kaise Ujale Lai"
  - "Talam Tol Kare, Ho Rahe Pare Pare"
  - "Meri Ankhiyo Me Jhume Dekho Saajan Ka Pyar"
  - "Aankhon Aankhon Me Ho Gaye Mast Ishare"
- Karigar -
  - "Main Hoon Rosy, Main Hoon Mary" with C. Ramchandra
  - "Boot Chappal Sandal" with Usha Mangeshkar
- Khota Paisa -
  - "Ye Zalim Nigaho Ki Ghaat"
  - "Jogiya Jogiya Kaha Jane Laga"
  - "O Jane Jaan Ek Muddat Ke Baad Yahan Aa"
  - "Holi Hai Holi Sakhi"
  - "Adayen Jab Ho Latkedar" with Mohammed Rafi
- Lajwanti -
  - "Koi Aaya Dhadkan Kehti Hai"
  - "Gaa Mere Man Gaa"
  - "Kuchh Din Pahale Ek Taal Mein"
  - "Chanda Re, Chanda Re, Chhupe Rehna"
  - "Chanda Re, Chanda Re, Chhupe Rehna (sad)"
  - "Ek Hans Ka Joda"
  - "Chandamama Mere Dwar Aana" with Manna Dey
- Lala Rookh -
  - "Pyaas Kuchh Aur Bhi Bhadka Di"
  - "Le Ja Meri Duayen"
  - "Pyas Kuch Aur Bhi Bhadka Di"
  - "Alvida Jane Wafa Tera Nigaheba Khuda"
- Light House -
  - "Tang Aa Chuke Hai Kashmakash-e-Zindagi Se Hum"
  - "O Kis Jagha Jayen"
  - "Naino Se Naina Laage"
  - "Chima Chima Chimchima"
  - "Tu Kaala Main Gori Balam Tori" with Mohammed Rafi
- Madhumati - "Kancha Le Kanchi Lai Lajo" with Sabita Chowdhury, and Ghulam Mohammad
- Malik -
  - "Padhoge Likhoge Banoge Nawab"
  - "Kiya Tha Pyar"
- Matwala -
  - "Ankh Mili Dil Mila" with Mohammed Rafi
  - "Jadu Hai Kya Jadu Hai" with Mohammed Rafi
  - "Thoda Thoda Gussa Re"
- Mausi -
  - "Kya Ho Gaya Kya Ho Gaya"
  - "He Bambo Bambolo"
  - "Ja Ri Ja Bayi Mai Deu Bidaayi"
- Maya Bazaar -
  - "Har Phool Mein Masti Hai" with Mohammed Rafi
  - "Akhiyon Mein Samaate Ho" with Mohammed Rafi
  - "Gore Gore Gulabi Gaal Re" with Mohammed Rafi
  - "Haste Ho Taaron Tum, Kisi Ka Pyar Rota Hai"
  - "Ja Ja Re Chhaliya Kanhaiya"
  - "Gora Ho Chahe Kaala, Albela Hai Dilwala"
  - "Kaise Chalungi Mai Akeli"
- Mehndi - "Gaao Ri Sakhi, Aayi Khushi Ki Ghadi"
- Miss 1958 -
  - "Dil Ne Dil Ko Kiya Ishaara"
  - "Rang Bhare Din Hain"
- Miss Punjab Mail -
  - "Chanchal Nain Mila Ke Dil Mera Loot Liya"
  - "Prem Nagar Se Aaya"
  - "O Babu Gentleman, Dekh Ke Tikhe Tikhe Nain"
  - "Jadugar Sawariya"
  - "Ae Ji Shama Kahi Bhi Jalti Hai"
- Mr. Cartoon M.A. -
  - "Mai Mai Qartoon (Version 1)" with Mohammed Rafi, and Geeta Dutt
  - "Mai Mai Qartoon (Version 2)" with Mohammed Rafi, and Geeta Dutt
  - "Mera Dil Ghabraye Meri Aankh Sharmaye" with Mohammed Rafi
  - "Dil Tera Diwana O Mastani Bulbul" with Geeta Dutt
  - "Nain Hamare Do"
  - "Chanda Chale Jhoom Ke"
  - "Main Hoon Miss Bombay"
- Mujrim -
  - "Jaane Jigar Yun Hi Agar" with Mohammed Rafi
  - "Sun Sun Madras Ki Chhori" with Geeta Dutt
  - "Baithe Baithe Dur Se Lage Ho"
  - "Jaye Na Pakad Kahi"
  - "Karke Pyar Pyar Pyar Jadu Dar Dar"
  - "Do Nigahen Teri Do Nigahen Meri"
- Naag Champa -
  - "Kis Chhaliya Ki Nainon Ki Jaal Mein"
  - "Pehli Milan Ki Raat Hai"
- Naya Paisa -
  - "O Meri Bulbul-e-Baghdad" with Mohammed Rafi
  - "Tere Ghungroo Jo Chham Chham Baaje" with Mohammed Rafi
- Night Club -
  - "Sanam Jab Ghar Se Nikal Ke Chalo"
  - "Jhoom Ke Chale Ye Chale"
  - "Main Hoon Jaadugar"
  - "Tum Bade Woh Ho, Dil Jalate Ho"
  - "Dil Le Ke Bhage Jaate Ho"
  - "Nigahon Ka Ishara Hai Bahon Ka Sahara Hai" with Shamshad Begum
- Parvarish - "Jane Kaisa Jadu Kiya Re" with Sudha Malhotra
- Pati Parmeshwar -
  - "O Naari Apni Shakti Ko Pehchan"
  - "Ek Palde Mein Pati Biraje"
  - "Chalo Re Man Ganga Jamuna Teer"
  - "Chhod Ke Gehne Mai Pehnungi Mala"
  - "Jogi Jogi Jog Laga Ke Baithe"
  - "Meri Thokar Se Dharti Ka"
  - "Khan Khan Khan Kya Bol Raha Hai" with Manna Dey
- Phagun -
  - "Ek Pardesi Mera Dil Le Gaya" with Mohammed Rafi
  - "Tum Rooth Ke Mat Jaana" with Mohammed Rafi
  - "Mai Soya Ankhiya Miche" with Mohammed Rafi
  - "Bana De, Bana De, Bana De Prabhu Ji" with Mohammed Rafi
  - "Sun Jaa Pukaar, Beet Na Jaaye Ye Bahaar"
  - "Piyaa Piyaa Na Laage Moraa Jiya"
  - "Teer Ye Chhupke Chalaaya Kisne"
  - "Shokh Aankhen Tujh Ko Bula Rahi Hain"
  - "Chham Chham Ghungroo Bole"
  - "Aur To Koi Nahin Sahaara"
- Phir Subah Hogi -
  - "Phir Na Kije Meri Gustakh Nigahi Ka Gila" with Mukesh
  - "Woh Subah Kabhi Toh Aayegi (duet)" with Mukesh
  - "Woh Subah Kabhi To Aayegi (female)"
  - "Do Boonde Saawan Ki Haaye"
- Post Box No. 999 - "Bichhde Hue Phir Milenge" with Mohammed Rafi
- Raagini -
  - "Piya Main Hoon Patang Tu Dor" with Kishore Kumar
  - "Main Bangali Chhokra" with Kishore Kumar
  - "Mujhko Baar Baar Yaad Na Aa" with Kishore Kumar
  - "Mud Mud Hamako Dekhata" with Kishore Kumar
  - "Iss Duniya Se Nirala Hu Main" with Geeta Dutt
  - "Hoon Main Raat Guzaari Haye"
  - "Chhota Sa Balma"
  - "Mere Dil Ki Paayal"
- Raj Pratigya - "Ab Toh Dil Ko Chain"
- Raj Tilak -
  - "Aaja Tu Raja Aaja" with Sudha Malhotra
  - "Jaan-E-Jigar, Dekho Idhar"
  - "Chalna Sambhal Sambhalke Ji" with Mohammed Rafi
- Raja Beta -
  - "Diwana Dil Mastana Dil"
  - "Jane Ye Kaisa Ishara"
  - "Main To Dil Aise Ko Doon" with Meena Kapoor
- Ram Bhakta Hanuman -
  - "Jago Jago Jago Swami Antaryami"
  - "Chapal Chameli Aaj"
  - "Hasti Huyi Gati Huyi Aayi Hawaye"
- Sachche Ka Bol Bala -
  - "Badi Mushkil Se Mile Ho" with Mohammed Rafi
  - "Gore Gaal Pe Til Kala Kala" with Mohammed Rafi
  - "Dekh Le Pyar Me Kaisa Maza"
  - "Bairi Payaliya Se Dar Mohe Lage"
- Sadhna - "Sambhal Aye Dil" with Mohammed Rafi
- Sanskar -
  - "Radhe Tere Aansu Pi Ko Rok Na Payenge"
  - "Kaanp Kaanp Jata Hai"
  - "Hath Mera Tham Ke Chhod Dena Na Ji"
  - "Dil Shaam Se Dooba Jaata Hai"
- Shan-e-Hatim -
  - "Dua Hai Yahi Tazdar Madina Ki Dekhe" with Mohammed Rafi
  - "Jhairan Hu Kis Se Pyar Karu"
- Sitamgar -
  - "Taqti Rah Kamal Nain Kab Se"
  - "Main Bhi Teri, Dil Bhi Tera"
- Sitaron Se Aage -
  - "Chanda Ke Chandni Ka Jadu"
  - "Roye Jiya Aan Milo Sajna (version 1)"
  - "Roye Jiya Aan Milo Sajna (version 2)"
  - "Aaj Kal Parso Mein"
- Solva Saal -
  - "Dekho Ji Mera Haal Badal Gaye" with Mohammed Rafi, and Sudha Malhotra
  - "Nazar Ki Katari Ye Kaisi Chale"
  - "Ye Bhi Koi Ruthne Ka Mausam Hai"
- Sone Ki Chidiya -
  - "Pyaar Par Bas To Nahin Hai Mera (duet)" with Talat Mahmud
  - "Sach Bataa Tu Mujh Pe Fidaa" with Talat Mahmud
  - "Raat Bhar Ka Hai Mehmaan Andhera" with Mohammed Rafi
  - "Pyar Par Bas To Nahi Hai Mera"
  - "Saiyan Jab Se Ladi Hai Tose Ankhiya"
  - "Chhuk Chhuk Chhuk Chhuk Rel Chale"
  - "Bekas Ki Tabahi Ke Samaan Hazaro Hai"
- Suhaag -
  - "Chamko Poonam Chanda Is Dil Ka Sandesh"
  - "Raja Pyare Aaja Pyare"
  - "Is Lok Mein Is Raah Mein" with Manna Dey
  - "Nache Hum Ab Gaye Hum" with Manna Dey
- Sun To Le Haseena -
  - "Zara Sun Toh Lo Haseena" with Mohammed Rafi
  - "Jawan Ankhon Mein Kitna Sarur Hota Hai" with Mohammed Rafi
  - "Musafir Rah Kar Paida Khuda Manzil" with Mohammed Rafi
  - "Husn Ki Mehfil Saji Saji" with Mohammed Rafi
  - "Banke Teerandaz Jan Le Lena" with Mohammed Rafi
- Talaq -
  - "Mere Jeevan Mein Kiran Banke Bikharnewale" with Manna Dey
  - "Zara To Aankhen Dekho Mila Ke" with Manna Dey
  - "Nayee Umar Ki Kaliyo Tumko"
  - "Lagi Jo Takkar, Are Kha Gaye Chakkar"
  - "Aye Duniya Ke Maa Baap" with Aarti Mukherjee
- Taxi 555 -
  - "Naa Naa Haan Haan Karke" with S. Balbir
  - "Bhale Din Aanewale Hai" with S. Balbir
  - "Ho Gaye Gentleman Balaam" with Mohammed Rafi
- Taxi Stand -
  - "Yeh Hawa, Yeh Fiza, Yeh Sama"
  - "Humko Toh Teri Nigahon Ne Mara"
  - "Aise Mein Aapse" with Mohammed Rafi
  - "Aana Hai Toh Chale Aao" with Mohammed Rafi
- Ten O'Clock -
  - "Chand Nikla Sitare Dhime Pade"
  - "Hum Dil Ki Tassalli Ka Samaan Luta Baithe"
- Zimbo -
  - "Ye Raat Hai Mahtabi Sama Hai Diwane"
  - "Lo Chale Hum Behke Kadam"
  - "Ye Kiya Tune Kaisa Jadu"
- Zindagi Ya Toofan -
  - "Mujhe Hai Zara Jazbe Dil Aazmana" with Talat Mahmood
  - "Hamara Kyaa Hai Hum Tadpe" with Talat Mahmood
  - "Aye Dilwalo Pyar Na Karna"
  - "Mubaarik Sabko Phulon Ka Sajaa Kar"
  - "Zindagi Hai Ya Koi Tufan Hai (Female)"
  - "Badi Mushkil Se Hum Samjhe" with Shamshad Begum
  - "Angdaai Bhi Woh Lene Na Paaye" with Shamshad Begum
  - "Khub Ulfat Me Paydari Hai" with Sudha Malhotra

=== 1959 ===
- Angan -
  - "Mere Ram Chala Banwas"
  - "Akhiyon Mein Basiyo Raja"
  - "Chhupne Ki Cheez Hai"
  - "Ghughat Se Kyu Naina Jhanke" with Mohammed Rafi
  - "Sitamgar Dekh Le Najar Bar Dekh Le" with Geeta Dutt
- Baap Bete - "Mere Dil Mein Aanewale" with Mohammed Rafi
- Bank Manager -
  - "Saba Se Yeh Keh Do"
  - "Dariya Ka Kinara Haay Haay"
  - "Ajee O Zaraa Apni Nigahon Ko Sambhalo"
  - "Mera Dilbar Hazaro Me Ek Hai"
- Bhai Bahen -
  - "Saare Jahan Se Achcha"
  - "In Ujale Mehlon Ke Tale"
  - "Bachcho Sunn Lo Meri Baat"
- Bhakt Prahlad -
  - "Main Toh Hari Gun Gaaun"
  - "Suno Mann Ki Pukaar"
- Bus Conductor -
  - "Zindagi Me Rang Bhara Hai Pyar Ka" with Mohammed Rafi
  - "Paas Humare Aayiye Aji Dur Se Na" with Mohammed Rafi
  - "Dil Se Mai Aur Mujhse Dil Takra Gaya"
  - "Radha Ki Paayal, Kanhaiya Ki Choli"
- C.I.D. Girl -
  - "Khoche Jhoot Nahi" with Mohammed Rafi
  - "Badi Buland Meri Prabhu Ki Pasand" with Mohammed Rafi
  - "Darde Dil Jara Jara Deta Hai Bada Maza" with Sudha Malhotra
  - "Ek Baat Sun Matwale"
  - "Ankhiyon Mein Dil Khoya"
- Chacha Zindabad -
  - "Nazarein Utha Ke Zara Dekh Le"
  - "Jao Ji Jao Tumhe Maan Liya Saiyan"
- Chaand Ki Duniya -
  - "Aa Aa Aa Jhoom Rahi Hai Mast Baharen" with Mohammed Rafi
  - "Aayi Hawani Badi Deewani" with Manna Dey
  - "Sachchi Hai Agar Preet Meri"
  - "Yeh Kisne Jaadu Daala Hai"
- Charnon Ke Dasi -
  - "Aaj Pariksha Ki Ghadi"
  - "Mere Man Ke Meet"
  - "Rok Nahin Sakta Koyi"
  - "Roti Chhod Ke Sang Ki Saheliya"
  - "Sun Le Sun Le Kyo Behra Bana"
- Chhoti Bahen - "Kali Anar Ki Na Itna Satao" with Manna Dey
- Commander -
  - "Meri Baat Koi Maane Ya Na Maane"
  - "Tere Liye O Bewafa"
- Daaka -
  - "Le Le Yeh Dil, Tera Nazrana Hai"
  - "Thandi Hawa Lag Na Jaaye"
- Deep Jalta Rahe -
  - "Tohre Nainwa Mein Humre Nainwa Khoyi Gawa"
  - "Dali Pe Baithi Thi Das Chidiya"
  - "Dekho Ji Ras Le Gayo Bhanwra Beiman"
  - "Cham Cham Geet Sunaye"
  - "Ek Daur Naya Duniya Me Shuru"
- Dhool Ka Phool -
  - "Dhadakane Lage Dil Ke Taaron Ki Duniya" with Mahendra Kapoor
  - "Jhukti Ghata, Gaati Hawa, Sapne Jagaye" with Mahendra Kapoor
  - "Jo Tum Muskura Do" with Mahendra Kapoor
- Didi -
  - "Pyaar Hi Mujhe Darkar Hai"
  - "Mamaji Ki Rocket Pe Hum"
  - "Bachchon Tum Taqdeer Ho" with Mohammed Rafi
  - "Humne Suna Tha Ek Hai Bharat (version 1)" with Mohammed Rafi
  - "Humne Suna Tha Ek Hai Bharat (version 2)" with Mohammed Rafi
- Dil Deke Dekho -
  - "Dil Deke Dekho" with Mohammed Rafi
  - "Bade Hain Dil Ke Kaale" with Mohammed Rafi
  - "Yaar Chulbula Hai, Haseen Dilruba Hai" with Mohammed Rafi
  - "Pyar Ki Kasam Hai" with Mohammed Rafi
  - "Kaun Ye Aaya Mehfil Mein" with Mohammed Rafi
  - "Rock Rock Baby Rock" with Mohammed Rafi
- Do Dost -
  - "Mat Samajh Mujhe Tu Kangala" with Mohammed Rafi
  - "Sun Sun Ri Saheli"
  - "Oye Bach Ke Rehna Babu"
- Do Gunde -
  - "Aise Machal Ke, Nain Badal Ke"
  - "Kaise Bijli Chamak Gayi" with Manna Dey, Chaand Kumari, and Mohammed Rafi
  - "Lehron Mein Jhool Ke, Khushiyon Mein Phool Ke" with Mohammed Rafi
  - "Kahin Chalo Ki Din Hai Bahar Ke" with Mahendra Kapoor
- Do Ustad -
  - "Khayalon Pe Mere Chhaye Huye" with Mohammed Rafi, and Shamshad Begum
  - "Nazron Ke Teer Maare Kas" with Mohammed Rafi
  - "Tere Dil Ka Makaan Saiyan" with Mohammed Rafi
  - "Rik Rik Tik Tik Tik Boom Boom Chik" with Mohammed Rafi
  - "Tu Ladki Main Ladka" with Mohammed Rafi
  - "Ruk Ruk Kahan Chali Deewani" with Mohammed Rafi
  - "Aaya Tumpe Dil Aaya Kya Karu"
- Doctor Z - "Yeh Udaas Aasman, Raat Yeh Duan"
- Duniya Na Mane -
  - "Sitaron Chhup Jaana, Nazar Na Lagana"
  - "Jaa Re Jaa Re Jaa Re Anadi Balama"
  - "Aeingan Baingan Tali Taleingan" with Shamshad Begum
- Fashionable Wife -
  - "Yeh Bhi To Insaan (version 1)"
  - "Yeh Bhi To Insaan (version 2)"
- Flying Rani -
  - "Mujhko Sanam Tere Pyar Ne" with Manna Dey
  - "Sapne Mein Saiyan Tum Aaya Na Karo" with Manna Dey
  - "Mujhe Teri Nazar Ne Maara"
  - "Chupke Se Meri Gali Aana"
  - "Chalna Sher Akad Ke Koi Bigade Koi Badke"
  - "Is Desh Je Hum Rakhwale Hai"
- Forty Days -
  - "Ho Kaho Aake Bahaar Kare Mera Singaar" with Mukesh
  - "Nasib Hoga Mera Meharaban" with Manna Dey
  - "Parvat Parvat Dera Dala" with Mahendra Kapoor
  - "Dekho Ye Tare Khoye Khoye"
  - "Jhuti Mohabbat Jhuti Adayen"
  - "Dhadke Dil Dildar Ka"
  - "Baithe Hain Rehguzar"
- Grihalakshmi -
  - "Kab Darshan Doge Saanwre"
  - "Is Duniya Me Kuch Insaan"
  - "Darshan Bin Ab"
  - "Ek Nayan Mein Saas"
  - "Lal Chunariya Pili Choli"
  - "Lal Lal La Layi Ji Main"
- Heera Moti - "Ghar Ke Jogi Ka Bhes" with Usha Mangeshkar
- Insan Jaag Utha -
  - "Mehnatkash Insaan Jaag Utha" with Mohammed Rafi
  - "Chaand Sa Mukhda Kyon Sharmaya" with Mohammed Rafi
  - "Ankhein Chaar Hote Hote"
  - "Baat Badhti Gayi Khel Khel Mein"
  - "Baharon Se Nazaron Se Yeh Dekho"
  - "Jaanu Jaanu Ri Kahin Khanaki Hai Tori Kangana" with Geeta Dutt
- Jaalsaaz -
  - "Teri Nazar Ne Kiya Kya Ishara" with Mohammed Rafi
  - "Dil To Hamar Lai Lai"
  - "Kal Maine Ek Sapna Dekha"
- Jagir -
  - "Na Na Zara Ruk Ja, Zara Ruk Jaa"
  - "Wafaon Ke Badale Jafaa Kar Rahe"
- Jawani Ki Hawa -
  - "Lo Wo Aa Gaye"
  - "Chali Kaisi Ye Jawani Ki Hawa"
  - "Babu Re Babu Re Garib Ki Hu Chokri"
  - "Bahaar Leke Aayi Karar Leke Aayi"
  - "Chanda Ke Paas Ek Taara"
  - "Kaun Jane Re Baba" with Mohammed Rafi, and Geeta Dutt
- Kaagaz Ke Phool -
  - "San San San Woh Chali Hawa" with Mohammad Rafi
  - "Ulte Seedhe Dao Lagaye" with Mohammad Rafi
- Kal Hamara Hai -
  - "Aise Na Dekho Rasiya"
  - "Jhoke Hai Badal Baalon Ke" with Mohammed Rafi
- Kali Topi Lal Rumal -
  - "O Kali Topiwale Tera Naam Toh Bataa" with Mohammed Rafi
  - "Yaaron Ka Pyaar Liye, Vaaden Hazar Liye" with Mohammed Rafi
- Kavi Kalidas -
  - "Sakhi Hriday Mein Halchal Si Hone Laagi" with Geeta Dutt, and Manna Dey
  - "Pranay Viraah Aur Milan Ki Abhigyan" with Manna Dey
- Khoobsurat Dhokha -
  - "Meri Nazaro Ne Bandha Nishana"
  - "Lutengi Ankhe Sharmili Sambhalna"
  - "Hairelu Lusha Lu Lusha Lara"
- Kya Yeh Bombai Hai -
  - "Aaj Teri Jeet Ho Gayi"
  - "Nain Katile Honth Rasile" with Seeta Banerjee
  - "Thandi Thandi Yeh Hawa" with Manna Dey
  - "E Se Banti Imli" with Mohammed Rafi
  - "Zara Bachke Chalna" with Mohammed Rafi
- Ladki -
  - "Ladki Ran Namuna Kan Main Laakh Teri Maanunga" with Mohammed Rafi
  - "Gore Rang Na Kisi Ka Ho"
- Maa Ke Ansoo - "Kisi Se Aankh Ladi" with Suman Kalyanpur
- Madhu -
  - "Ho Deke Badnaami Zamane Bhar Ki" with Mohammed Rafi
- Main Nashe Mein Hoon - "Gair Ki Gali Mein Iya Tumne Mera Naam Liya"
- Maine Jeena Seekh Liya -
  - "Itni Si Baat Pe Bigad Gaye" with Mohammed Rafi
  - "Ye Nasha Aap Ka Sarkar Utar Jayega"
  - "O Mere Suraj Chand Sitare"
  - "Chanda Tere Mama Hai, Nehru Tere Chacha Hai"
  - "Ye Zameen Ye Gagan"
  - "Ae Ji Maine Poochha Apko (female)"
- Minister -
  - "Mujhko Teri Hi Talash Hai" with Mahendra Kapoor
  - "Ae Ji Biwi Ko Ghar Pe Bithala Ke"
  - "Hello, Hello, Hello, Mijaaz To Hazoor Ke Hain Achchhe"
  - "Lo Aaj Suno Apne Shaahido Ki Kahani"
- Mohar - "Surat Yatim Ki, Shauq Yatim Ka"
- Naach Ghar -
  - "Jaaneman Chilman Utha Kar Dekh Le" with Mohammed Rafi
- Nai Raahen - "Tohse Naina Laage Saiyan" with Usha Mangeshkar
- Navrang -
  - "Aadha Hai Chandrama, Raat Aadhi" with Mahendra Kapoor
  - "Tu Chhupi Hai Kahaan" with Manna Dey
  - "Rang De Re Jeevan Ka Chunariya" with Manna Dey
  - "Aayaa Holi Ka Tyohaar" with C. Ramachandra
  - "Kaari Kaari Kaari Andhiyaari Thi Raat" with C. Ramachandra
  - "Tum Mere Mai Teri"
  - "Aa Dil Se Dil Mila Le"
- Paigham -
  - "Main Kyun Na Naachu Aaj"
  - "O Ameeron Ke Parmeshwar (version 1)"
  - "O Ameeron Ke Parmeshwar (version 2)"
  - "Kahaan Hain Ham Ye Aaj" with Mohammed Rafi
  - "Badla Sara Zamana Babu" with Mohammed Rafi
  - "Hum Rang Rangili Jobanvan Ki Titliya" with Suman Kalyanpur
- Pakshiraj -
  - "Lalchaye Re Nazar Lalchaye Re"
  - "Hahakar Macha Hai Jag Mein" with Sabita Chowdhury
- Pehli Raat -
  - "Bata Ae Aasman Mai Ab Jau Kahan"
  - "Aaj Chupke Se Ho Gayi"
  - "So Jaa Meri Rani"
  - "Ye Powder Ye Surkhiya Gira Rahi Hai Bijliya" with Mohammed Rafi
  - "Zamana Pyar Ka Mausam Bahar Ka" with Mohammed Rafi
  - "Kyon Dil Humko De Dala" with Manna Dey
  - "Humko Duaye Do Tumhe Katil Bana Diya" with Mohammed Rafi, and Sudha Malhotra
  - "Aurat To Bithaiye Dil Mein Tumhe" with Talat Mahmud
- Pyar Ki Rahen -
  - "Hum Bhi Is Duniya Mein Kya Taqdeer Lekar Aaye Hai"
  - "Gori Gori Baahe Tikhi Tikhi Hai Ye Nigahen"
- Raat Ke Rahi -
  - "Tu Kya Samjhe Tu Kya Jaane"
  - "Paubarah Paubarah Pyar Mein Paubarah"
  - "Daye Baye Chhup Chhupa Ke Kaha Chale"
  - "Aa Bhi Ja Bewafa"
- Saahil -
  - "Raat Aadhi Ho Gayi" with Hemant Kumar
  - "Sheetal Pavan Sanasan Dole"
  - "Teri Nazar Ne Maara" with Mohammed Rafi
  - "Tumhari Mohabbat Hai Ek Chiz Aisi" with Hemant Kumar
  - "Aayi Milan Ki Raat"
  - "Afsos Meri Taqdeer Bante Hi Bigad Gayi"
  - "Dekho Ji Humein Na Dena Dhokha"
  - "Mohabbat Sabko Milti Hai"
- Sati Vaishalini -
  - "Aare Vidhata Aare Vidhata"
  - "Chahe Bhale Chanda Tale"
  - "Ghiri Ghataye Ghanghor"
  - "Paanv Me Kaate Bichhe"
  - "Tu Chahe To Raat"
  - "Kaho Ji Kaun Bole" with Mohammed Rafi
- Sazish -
  - "Bachke Zara Hat Ke Zara"
  - "Mera Naam Zubeda Khanam"
  - "Meri Nazron Meim Tum Hi Tum Ho"
  - "Basre Se Aayi Hasina"
  - "Hum Samjhe Anadi"
  - "Tum Ho Mere Sanam Khuda Kasam"
  - "Yun Na Dekho Meri Jaan"
  - "Zara Idhar To Aa Matwali" with Mohammed Rafi
- Smuggler - "Behli Behki Chaal Meri"
- Sujata -
  - "Bachpan Ke Din Bhi" with Geeta Dutt
  - "Kali Ghata Chhaye"
  - "Tum Jiyo Hazaaron Saal"
- Tipu Sultan -
  - "Aaj Deewane Chale Aag Se Takrane" with Sudha Malhotra
  - "Lagu Main Kaisi Tumko Sanam" with Mohammed Rafi
  - "Nache Umang Jhume Tarang"
  - "Kabhi Hu Karke Kabhi Ha Karke"

== 1960s ==
=== 1960 ===
- Aai Phir Se Bahar -
  - "Hua Gulshan Viran Re Ae Dil"
  - "Mujhse Keh Di Hai Tune"
- Aanchal -
  - "O O Naache Re Raadha" with Suman Kalyanpur
  - "Ghunghat Kali Ka Na Khol Bhanware"
  - "E Ji O O Kuchh To Bolo" with Mahendra Kapoor
  - "Gaa Raha Hai Zindagi Har Taraf" with Mahendra Kapoor
- Abdulla -
  - "Chand Ka Tika Pad Gaya Phika"
  - "Cham Cham Payal Bole"
  - "Khamosh Nazare Hai Phike"
- Air Mail - "Shun Sahdap Nazron Ki Jhadap Hone De"
- Alam Ara Ki Beti -
  - "Main Hoon Toh Ujala Hai Yeh" with Suman Kalyanpur
  - "Mast Nazron Se Pee Ke Dekho"
- Angulimaal -
  - "Buddhang Sharanam Gachchhami" with Manna Dey
  - "Bade Aaye Shikari Shikar Karne" with Manna Dey
  - "Om Namo Brahmanadevay Muraliwale Gopal"
- Apna Ghar -
  - "Soch Samajh Le O Parwane" with Mohammed Rafi
  - "Hai Tera Bhi Irada Aur Mera Bhi Irada" with Mohammed Rafi
  - "Aaram Hai Haram" with Mohammed Rafi
- Apna Haath Jagannath -
  - "Tum Jahan Jahan" with Kishore Kumar
  - "Chhayi Ghata Bijli" with Kishore Kumar
- Babar - "Hasinon Ke Jalwe Pareshan Rehte" with Mohammed Rafi, Manna Dey, and Sudha Malhotra
- Bade Ghar Ki Bahu -
  - "Zara Sambhal Ke Dil Lagana"
  - "Hawa Mein Tinka Tinka Hoke Bikhra"
  - "Cham Cham Chamaka Saaraa Jahaan"
  - "Aayi Hai Bambai Se Piya"
  - "Sarke Chunariya Lachke Kamariya"
- Bahana -
  - "Teri Nigahon Mein, Tere Hi Bahon Mein" with Talat Mahmud
  - "Mohabbat Kya Hai, Haseen Dhokha Hai"
- Barsaat Ki Raat -
  - "Naa To Kaaravaan Ki Talaash Hai" with Sudha Malhotra, Mohammed Rafi, Manna Dey, and S. D. Batish
  - "Yeh Ishq Ishq Hai Ishq Ishq" with Sudha Malhotra, Mohammed Rafi, Manna Dey, and S. D. Batish
  - "Nigaah-E-Naaz Ke Maaro Ka Haal Kya Hoga" with Sudha Malhotra
  - "Na Khanjar Uthega Na Talvaar Tumse" with Sudha Malhotra, and Balbir
- Basant -
  - "Mere Lehange Mein Ghungroo La De" with Mohammed Rafi
  - "Chori Chori Ek Ishara Ho Gaya Hai" with Mohammed Rafi
  - "Ghum Ke Aaya Hu Mai Bandhu" with Mohammed Rafi
  - "Mere Dil Pe Lagade Darling" with Mohammed Rafi
  - "Raat Chandani Samay Suhana Hai"
  - "Pichhe Hat Hat Hat Babu Chhed Na"
  - "Ukkad Dukkad Bamba"
  - "Aji Ulfat Ko Khushiyo Ki Khani" with Mohammed Rafi, and S. D. Batish
  - "Raaste Me Ek Hasin Aji Mil Gaya" with Mohammed Rafi
  - "Kitni Badal Gayi Hai" with Mohammed Rafi
  - "Naino Me Suraj Ki Kirane" with Mohammed Rafi
- Bambai Ki Billi -
  - "Meri Adaye Bijli Giraye"
  - "Zalim Zulm Na Kar Abhi Sambhal Ja"
- Bewaqoof -
  - "Tumi Piya Chikara" with Kishore Kumar
  - "Michael Hai Toh Cycle Hai" with Kishore Kumar
- Bindiya - "Tane Tandane Bhai Tandane Tane"
- Black Prince -
  - "Meethi Lagi Hai Teri Bin"
- Bombai Ka Babu -
  - "Deewana Mastana Hua Dil" with Mohammed Rafi
  - "Pavan Chale To Uthe Nadi Mein Lahar Si" with Mohammed Rafi
  - "Dekhne Mein Bhola Hai, Dil Ka Salona"
  - "Aise Me Kachhu Kaha Nahi Jaye"
- Captain India - "Chhune Na Doongi Sharir"
- Chaudhvin Ka Chand -
  - "Sharmake Yeh Kyun Pardanashin" with Shamshad Begum
  - "Bedardi Mere Saiya Shabnam Hai"
  - "Dil Ki Kahani Rang Layi Hai"
- Dekha Jayega - "Aaja Mere Dilruba"
- Dil Apna Aur Preet Parai -
  - "Ui Itni Badi Mehfil Aur Ik Dil"
- Do Aadmi - "Jaagi Saari Saari Ratiyan"
- Dr. Shaitan -
  - "Gore Gore Galo Se Ujli Dhoop"
  - "Humein Raste Mein Chhede Kyun" with Mohammed Rafi
- Duniya Jhukti Hai -
  - "Ammi O Mummy, Mera Baap Bada Dilwala"
  - "Lagi Tumse Nazariyaa Lagi"
  - "Bulbul Ke Nasheman Par Bijli To Giri"
  - "Tu Jhukane Per To Aa, Sochta Hai Kya"
  - "Pyaar Mein Joker Ban Gaye Hum" with Mohammed Rafi
- Ek Ke Baad Ek -
  - "Pagli Hawa Jane Re"
  - "Nazar Milayi Toh Duniya Se Darna Kya" with Mohammed Rafi
  - "Aao Aao Aao Pyaro Dekho" with Mohammed Rafi
- Ghar Ki Laaj -
  - "Lal Batti Ka Nishan, Neeche Pan Ki Dukan" with Mohammed Rafi
  - "Teri Latka Laga Hai Latka" with Mohammed Rafi
  - "Aata Hai To Aane Do"
  - "Gham Denewale"
- Ghunghat -
  - "Ye Zindagi Ka Mausam Aur Ye Sama Suhana" with Mohammed Rafi
  - "Do Nain Mile Do Phool Khil" with Mahendra Kapoor
  - "Kya Kya Nazare Dikhati Hai Ankhiyan" with Mahendra Kapoor
  - "Dil Na Kahi Lagana Zalim Hai Ye Jamana"
  - "Pyari Sakhi Saj Dhaj Ke Apne"
  - "Gori Ghunghat Me Mukhda Chupao Na"
- Girl Friend - "Boom Booma Boom" with Kishore Kumar
- Hum Hindustani -
  - "Balma Re Haye, Meri Lat Suljha De"
  - "Neeli Neeli Ghata, O Bheegi Bheegi Hawa" with Mukesh
- Jaali Note -
  - "Sach Kehta Hoon Bahot Khubsurat Ho" with Mohammed Rafi
  - "Dil Hai Aapka Huzoor Ligiye Na" with Mohammed Rafi
  - "Chand Zard Zard Hai" with Mohammed Rafi
  - "O Mister Dil Badi Mushakil" with Mohammed Rafi
  - "Gustaakh Nazar Chehre Se Hata Humko Na Sataa" with Mohammed Rafi
  - "Nigaahon Ne Phenkaa Hai Panje Pe Chhakka" with Mohammed Rafi
  - "Idhar Dekh Mera Dil Tera Diwana Hai" with Shamshad Begum
- Jis Desh Mein Ganga Behti Hai - "Pyaar Ki Dagar Pe Koi" with Lata Mangeshkar
- Kala Bazar -
  - "Sambhalo Sambhalo Apna Dil"
  - "Sach Hue Sapne Tere"
  - "Shaam Dhali Dil Ki Laagi" with Manna Dey
- Kalpana -
  - "Beqasi Hadh Se Jab Guzar Jaaye"
  - "O Ji Saawan Me Hu Bekarar Sajnawa Se"
  - "Jaaye Jahan Meri Nazar"
  - "Hamko Samajh Na Lijiye Daali Ghulaab Ki"
  - "Main Khidki Pe Aaungi"
  - "Aana Aana Atariya Pe Aana"
  - "Pyara Pyara Hai Samaa" with Mohammed Rafi
  - "Hame Maaro Na Naino Ke Baan" with Mohammed Rafi
  - "Assalaam Aalekum Babu, Kaho Kaisa Haal Hai" with Sudha Malhotra
- Kohinoor - "Jaadugar Katil, Hazir Hai Mera Dil"
- Lalach -
  - "Aaja Aaja, Jiya Nahi Laaage"
- Lambe Haath -
  - "O Diwane Chhokre Rah Mera" with Mohammed Rafi
  - "Mohabbat Kar Ke Kya Loge" with Mohammed Rafi
  - "Are Main Hoon Teri Phuljhadi"
  - "Chale Hai Ishq Ladane"
  - "Dil Tod Tod, Mukh Mod Mod"
- Love in Simla -
  - "Love Ka Matlab Hai Pyar" with Mohammed Rafi
  - "Ae Baby Ae Jee Idhar Aao" with Mohammed Rafi
  - "Kiya Hai Dilruba Pyar Bhi Kabhi" with Mohammed Rafi
- Manzil -
  - "Dil To Hai Deewana" with Mohammed Rafi
  - "Aye Kash Chalte Mil Le" with Manna Dey
- Mehlon Ke Khwab -
  - "Kamla Razia Ya Miss Mary" with Kishore Kumar
  - "Aa Jaane Jigar" with Kishore Kumar
  - "Gar Tum Bura Na Mano" with Subir Sen
  - "Is Duniya Mein" with Geeta Dutt
  - "Piyo Piyo Nazar Pilati Hai"
- Masoom - "Desh Ka Pyara, Sab Ka Sahara Kaun Banega"
- Mera Ghar Mere Bachche -
  - "Peena Haraam Hai Na Pilana Haraam Hai"
  - "Galiya Hai Gulzar, Yaar Aaya Karo"
- Miss Goodnight -
  - "Mausam Suhana"
  - "Hum Toh Kisi Ke Ho Gaye"
- Mitti Mein Sona -
  - "Puchho Na Hamen Ham Unake Liye"
  - "Maine Kaha Miss What Is This" with Majrooh Sultanpuri
  - "Baal Bikhre Huye Gal Nikhre Huye" with Majrooh Sultanpuri
  - "Aankhon Se Aankh Mili Dil Se Dil" with Raja Mehdi Ali Khan
  - "Jab Is Dharti Par Dukh Pa Kar Roye Koi Insan" with Raja Mehdi Ali Khan
  - "Ek Ek Ankh Teri Sawa Sawa Lakh Di" with Raja Mehdi Ali Khan
- Miya Bibi Razi - "Piya Bin Nahin Mil Gaye Milanewals" with Mahendra Kapoor
- Mud Mud Ke Na Dekh -
  - "Hai Yeh June Ka Mahina"
  - "Aao Aao Ladaki Walo Ladka" with Geeta Dutt
- Mukti -
  - "Nigaan-e-Mehar Humse" with Mohammed Rafi
  - "Ye Zamin Hai Do Dilo Ke Pyar Ki" with Mohammed Rafi
  - "Mohe Kaari Kaari Badri"
  - "Bujh Jaaye Joo Jyoti Jal Jal Kar"
  - "Unke Hans Dene Par Khud Bhi Muskura Ka"
- Nai Maa -
  - "Jang Ka Dushman Aman Ka Saathi" with Mohammed Rafi
  - "Holi Aayi Holi Rang Gulal Udati" with Mahendra Kapoor
  - "Loot Le Khushiyo Ke Ae Dil Khajaane"
  - "Jab Shama Jali"
  - "Mana Ke Wafaa Jara Bhi Nahi Karte"
  - "Dil Tera Hai Diwana Khuda Sanam"
- Not Available - "Ek Ladki Nikli Ghar Se" with Mahendra Kapoor
- Pedro -
  - "Chale Jo Waar Kas Ke"
  - "Jawani Badi Cheez Hai (female)"
- Qatil -
  - "Jab Tum Nahi To Kya Kare" with Mukesh
  - "Naina Chaar Karna" with Mohammed Rafi
  - "Sitam Bekasi Pe Ye Kya Ho Raha Hai"
  - "Bewafa Deke Daaga Jaata Hai"
- Rangeela Raja -
  - "Pyaar Nahin Jaane Balam"
  - "Raat Rangeeli Aayi" with Mohammed Rafi
- Rickshawala -
  - "Bolo Dil Mera Machal Raha Kis Liye" with Mohammed Rafi
  - "Jawani Mein Toh Ek Dil Ki Zaroorat" with Mohammed Rafi
  - "Hum Jo Zinda Hai Toh"
  - "Neeli Saadi Sunehra Jhampar" with Geeta Dutt
- Road No. 303 -
  - "Dil Ko Ye Kya Hua"
  - "Sorry Sorry Very Sorry Aap Ki Kasam" with Mohammed Rafi
  - "Pehli Pehlu Baar Mile Hain Do Deewane" with Mohammed Rafi
- Saranga -
  - "Kin Ghadiyon Mein Preet Lagayi"
  - "Aa Ja Mere Saathee Aa Ja" with Mohammed Rafi
- Sarhad -
  - "Duniya Kya Hai Dafa Karo" with Mohammed Rafi
  - "Aaja Re More Oiya Na Jaa Re"
  - "Ae Mere Dil Jo Chal Diye"
  - "Aa Gaya Maza Pyar Ka Nash (female)"
  - "Naacho Ghum Ke Gaao Jhum Ke" with C. Ramchandra
  - "Gori Chali Kar Ke Singar" with C. Ramchandra
  - "Aa Gaya Maza Pyar Ka Nasha (duet)" with C. Ramchandra
- Shan-e-Hind - "O Jag Ke Palanhar"
- Sharif Daku -
  - "Nazneenon Se, Haseenon Se" with Ismail Azad
  - "Sun Mera Saaz Sun" with Mohammed Rafi
- Shravan Kumar -
  - "Rang Rangeelo Phagun Aayo" with Mahendra Kapoor
  - "O Chanda Kyon Itni Dur Humse"
- Superman -
  - "Babu O Babu Dil Thamna"
  - "Udh Udh Jaiye Aanchal"
  - "Ki Ek Tera Gora Mukhda" with Suman Kalyanpur
- Teer Aur Talwar -
  - "Mera Balam To Hai Dil Ka Kala"
  - "Milana Nazar Humse Balma"
  - "Yeh Naina Mere Unse Ulajh Nahi Jaiye"
  - "Na Socha Na Samjha Na Dekha" with Mahendra Kapoor
- Trunk Call -
  - "Tune Kitne Pyar Se Dekha Mujhko"
  - "Door Door Rehte Ho Ji"
  - "Mohabbat Ka Jadu"
  - "Thoda Pyar Vyar Kar Lo Babuji"
  - "Kaho Meri Sarkar, Tabiyat Kaisi Hai" with Mohammed Rafi
- Tu Nahin Aur Sahi -
  - "Meri Mehfil Mein Aake Dekh Le Zara" with Mohammed Rafi
  - "Deewana Hoon Main Pyaar Ka" with Mohammed Rafi
  - "Yeh Rang Bhare Baadal" with Mohammed Rafi
  - "Dekhiye Huzoor Mujhse Rehke Door" with Mohammed Rafi
  - "Man Hi Man Muskaye Re Dulhaniya"
- Zameen Ke Tare -
  - "Tinke Pe Tinka Chhuti Ke Din Ka"
  - "Chunnu Patang Ko Kehta Hai Kite" with Sudha Malhotra
  - "Kisi Ka Ma Na Mare Bachpan Mein (Duet)" with Mohammed Rafi
  - "Yeh Zamin Hamari Ye Aasman Hamara" with Manna Dey
  - "Deep Gagan Ke Tum Ho" with Sudha Malhotra
  - "O Mere Pyaaro, Zameen Ke Taaro" with Mohammed Rafi, and Sudha Malhotra

=== 1961 ===
- Amrit Manthan -
  - "Andhkar Chhaya Aakash Zanzanaya"
  - "Chum Chanana Chum, Jhoom Ke Baje Payal"
- Apsara -
  - "Chalti Chakki Dekh Ke"
  - "Ye Dil Chhed Koye Pyar Bhari Dastaan"
  - "Tu Mere Saath, Main Tere Saath" with Talat Mahmud
  - "Har Dam Tumhi Ko Pyar Kiye Ja Rahi Hoon Main" with Talat Mahmud
  - "Ae Zindagi Itni Haseen" with Talat Mahmud
- Batwara -
  - "Yeh Raat Yeh Fizayen Phir Aaye Ya Na Aaye" with Mohammed Rafi
  - "Munna Taaro Ka Raja Leke Chanda Ka Baaja"
  - "Baate Kahin Aur Bana"
  - "Gal Sun Kajrewaliye" with Geeta Dutt
- Bhabhi Ki Chudiyan -
  - "Kahan Ud Chale Hai Man Pran Mere" with Mukesh
  - "Ghoda Nachaye Mera Ladla"
  - "Chand Tu Yahan Hai Aur Chand Tu Wahan"
- Bhagwan Balaji -
  - "Sajna Hilmil Chalna" with Talat Mahmud
  - "Chhum Chhume Koyal Bole Ban Mein"
  - "Nanhe Se O Saathi Sun Le Tu"
- Daku Mansoor - "Khoya Hua Dil Mil Gaya"
- Dharmputra -
  - "Kya Dekha Nainon Wali"
  - "Main Jab Bhi Akeli Hoti Hoon"
- Do Bhai -
  - "Har Har Gange Har Har Bol"
  - "Chacha Daudiyo Re"
  - "Bala Se Dil Gaya, Mujhe Tu Mil Gaya"
  - "De Ke Daga Mere Dil Ko Luta"
  - "Kaun Jaane Har Bahaane" with Mukesh
- Ek Ladki Saat Ladke -
  - "Agar Tum Na Hanste" with Sudha Malhotra
  - "Teri Zulfon Ke Saaye Mein" with Mohammed Rafi
  - "Itni Si Baat Ka Fasana Na Banao" with Mohammed Rafi
  - "Mal Mal Ke Jaaye Mera Jiya" with Mahendra Kapoor
- Elephant Queen -
  - "Bewafa Mai Hoon"
  - "Diya Re Diya Re Tujhe Dil Diya"
- Flat No. 9 - "Naya Mausam Nai Raahen"
- Gharana -
  - "Jai Raghunandan, Jai Siya Ram" with Mohammed Rafi
  - "Jabse Tumhe Dekha Hai" with Mohammed Rafi
  - "Ho Gayi Re Main Toh Apne Balam Ki" with Mohammed Rafi
  - "Na Dekho Humein Ghur Ke Jadugar Saiyan" with Mohammed Rafi
  - "Yeh Duniya Usi Ki Jo Pyar Karle"
  - "Yeh Zindagi Ki Uljhanein"
  - "Dadi Amma, Dadi Amma, Maan Jaao" with Kamal Barot
  - "Mere Banne Ki Baat Na Poochho" with Shamshad Begum
- Gunga Jumna - "Tora Man Bada Paapi"
- Hum Dono -
  - "Abhi Na Jao Chhod Kar" with Mohammed Rafi
  - "Jahan Mein Aisa Kaun Hai"
  - "Dukh Aur Sukh Ke Raaste"
- Jadoo Nagri -
  - "Jadu Bhare Tere Naina Katile" with Mahendra Kapoor
  - "Loot Liya Re Jiya Loot Liya"
- Jai Bhawani -
  - "Mausam Machalta Hua, Dil Uchhalta Hua"
  - "Bawara Lama Suno Suno"
- Jai Chittod -
  - "Bhanwar More Jaipur Jaiyo Ji"
  - "Zara Sa Ghata Hai Sanghma" with Manna Dey
- Jhumroo -
  - "Are Baba Lu Baba" with Kishore Kumar
  - "Ae Bhola Bhala" with Kishore Kumar
  - "Babu Sunte Jaana" with Kishore Kumar
  - "Hey Jhoome Re" with Kishore Kumar
  - "Koi Albela Mastana" with Kishore Kumar
- Junglee - "Nain Tumhare Mazedaar O Janabe Aali" with Mukesh
- Kanch Ki Gudiya -
  - "Saath Ho Tum Aur Raat Javaan" with Mukesh
  - "Tumhara Pyar Meri Zindagani Ka Sahara Hai"
  - "Jhoomte Sharabi Zara Hosh Mein Aa"
  - "Aaya Ab Ja Ke Jine Ka Maza" with Mohammed Rafi
- Kismet Palat Ke Dekh -
  - "Jaa Jaa Balamwa, Kaahe Chhede Baar Baar"
  - "Daiya Re Aaj Kahun Main Re Tohse"
  - "Hua Karejwa Pe Jo Jahari Ka Vaar" with Usha Mangeshkar
  - "Kadam Larzeeda Larzeeda" with Yousuf Azad Qawwal
- Krorepati - "Aayi Asmaan Ke Raahi"
- Madan Manjari -
  - "Hum Apne Gham Ko Sajakar"
  - "Is Qadar Tera Tasavar"
- Mahavat -
  - "Sun Re Balam Dil Mera Tujhko Pukare" with Mohammed Rafi
  - "Yaar Tum Aao Ji Dheere Se" with Mohammed Rafi
  - "Raah To Hai Pyaar Ki" with Mohammed Rafi
  - "Manzil Pukare Badh Aa" with Mohammed Rafi
  - "Hum Bhale Ya Tum Bhale" with Mohammed Rafi
- Main Aur Mera Bhai -
  - "Aaye Ho To Jane Ka"
  - "Zara Zara Bhi Humse Ghabrana Na"
  - "Main Abhi Gair Hoon" with Mukesh
  - "Beeghi Beeghi Hawa Shokh Dhara" with Manna Dey
- Maya - "Jaadu Daale Hai Machal Machal Kiski Nazar"
- Miss Chalbaaz -
  - "O Bambaiwali Chhokri" with Sudha Malhotra
- Modern Girl -
  - "Tod Diya Chashma Mera Tune" with Mohammed Rafi
  - "Saaj Bajta Rahe Raksh Hota Rahe"
  - "Jo Pehli Mulakat Mein Sharmaata Hai"
  - "O Deewane Mere Jab Tera Dil Jale"
- Mr. India -
  - "Kahaan Chali Chham Se" with Mohammed Rafi
  - "Nazar Yeh Teri" with Mohammed Rafi
  - "Chod Ke Na Jaana" with Mohammed Rafi
- Nazrana - "Mere Peechhe Ek Deewana" with Mukesh
- Neela Aasman -
  - "Akele Hum Akele Tum" with Kishore Kumar
  - "Teri Awaaz Ban Ke" with Kishore Kumar
- Oomar Qaid -
  - "O Piya Jana Na Meri Raato Ki Neende Udana Na"
  - "Dil Wahan Jahan Ho Tum"
  - "Kaisi Bhekhudi Ka Saamna"
  - "Dil Ka Fasana Koi Na Jaana" with Mahendra Kapoor
- Pyaar Ka Sagar -
  - "Raat Raat Bhar Jaag Jaag Kar"
  - "Haal Dil Ka Sunaye Toh Kaise"
  - "Mohabbat Mein Kabhi Aisi Bhi Halaat"
  - "Tana Dere Na Tani Tum" with Shamshad Begum
  - "Mujhe Pyaar Ke Zindagi Denewale" with Mohammed Rafi
  - "Pyaar Ka Saagar Dekha Hai" with Mukesh
- Pyar Ki Dastan - "Pyaar Aisa Hamara Tunhara" with Suman Kalyanpur
- Pyar Ki Pyas -
  - "Jhoolo More Lalna" with Lata Mangeshkar
  - "Pyas Bujhane Sabke Man Ki" with Mahendra Kapoor, and Lata Mangeshkar
- Ram Leela - "Kya Karun Sajna"
- Razia Sultan -
  - "Dhalti Jaaye Raat, Keh Le Dil Ko Baat" with Mohammed Rafi
  - "Kehna Naa Mano Main Jawani Ka"
  - "Aaja Re Deewane Aaja Re Deewanne"
  - "Nahi Hai Koi Badaa Husn Se Zamane Mein" with Mahendra Kapoor
  - "Allah Kasam Aapse Hum Door Nahin" with Geeta Dutt
- Reshmi Rumal -
  - "Zulfon Ki Ghata Lekar" with Manna Dey
  - "Kyo Ji Aakhir Kaun Ho Tum" with Mukesh
  - "Sar Pe Chunariya"
- Roop Ki Rani Choron Ka Raja -
  - "Aaja Re Aaja Re, Aaja Nain Duare" with Subir Sen
  - "Jao Na Satao Rasiya"
- Salaam Mem Saheb -
  - "Hum Bhi Akele, Tum Bhi Akele" with Mohammed Rafi
  - "Kya Pyaar Nahin Mujhse" with Mohammed Rafi
  - "Kahiye Kaisa Mizaaj Hai Aapka" with Mohammed Rafi
  - "Mera Dil Deewana Hain Sanam"
  - "Aa Kehna Mera Aaj Maan Le"
  - "Abdullah Mera Naam"
  - "Aja Gusse Mein Yeh Baithe Hai"
- Sampoorna Ramayana -
  - "Hum Ramchandra Ki Chandrakala Mein Bhi" with Lata Mangeshkar
  - "Baar Baar Bagiya Mein Koyal Na Bole"
- Sanjog -
  - "Jis Raat Jale Na Parwane" with Mohammed Rafi
  - "Kehte Hai Chand Jisko"
- Shola Aur Shabnam - "Mummy Aur Daddy Mein Ladai Ho Gayi"
- Shola Jo Bhadke -
  - "Teri Kasam O Dilruba" with Mohammed Rafi
  - "Ghungroo Baje Chhum Chhum" with Mohammed Rafi
- Stree - "Jhoom Raha Hai Rom Rom Kyon" with Mahendra Kapoor
- Soorat Aur Seerat -
  - " Jaise Court Me Hakim Ki Chale Re Kalam"
  - "Garaj Ho To Nakhare Dikhati Hai Biwi"
- Toofani Tarzan -
  - "Mai Hu Jadu Garni Mera Kya Kehna"
  - "Raat Katati Nahi Haay Taron Bhari"
  - "Unse Meri Pehli Mulakat Ho Gayi"
- Wanted -
  - "Aayi Zindagi Ki Raat" with Mohammed Rafi
  - "Nigaahen Shauk Se Keh Do" with Mohammed Rafi
  - "Raat Bhar Gardish Me Saaki Aaj"
  - "Meri Chhoti Si Duniya Basi Rahe"
  - "Jo Dil Pe Guzarte Hai"
- Warrant -
  - "Le Gaya Dil Nikal Ke"
  - "O Beimaan Maine Tujhe Pehchana"
- Yeh Basti Yeh Log -
  - "Idhar Toh Dekho"
  - "Yeh Taaron Ki Mehfil" with Talat Mahmud
- Zamana Badal Gaya -
  - "Socho Ji Socho Ji Zamana Kya Kahta Hai" with Mohammed Rafi
  - "Lahol Wala Aji Masha Allah" with Mohammed Rafi
  - "Udhar Se Tu Aa Idhar Se Hum" with Mohammed Rafi
  - "Ganga Ki Dhaar Bahe Ulti Re Aaj"
  - "Angaarob Pe Chalta Hoga"
  - "Karne Wala Kar Gaya"
  - "Mere Sham Mere Giridhar"

=== 1962 ===
- Aarti -
  - "Woh Teer Dil Pe Chala" with Mohammed Rafi
  - "Na Bhanwara Na Koyi Gul" with Mohammed Rafi
  - "Pyar Ki Boliyan Bolti" with Mohammed Rafi
- Anpadh - "Dulhan Marwad Ki Aayi Chham Chham" with Mohammed Rafi
- Apna Banake Dekho -
  - "Hum Pyar Tumhe Karte Hain" with Mohammed Rafi
  - "Tere Sadke Mila De Mera Yaar" with Mohammed Rafi
  - "Kachchi Dagar Panghat Ki"
  - "Chahat Ka Deewana"
  - "Mile Hai Aap Jab Se"
- Baaje Ghungroo -
  - "Saari Raat Jaagi"
  - "Preet Bhayi Aisi"
- Baat Ek Raat Ki -
  - "Sheeshe Ka Ho Ya Patthar Ka Dil" with Mohammed Rafi
  - "Jo Ijaazat Ho To Ek Baat Kahun" with Mohammed Rafi
  - "Jo Hai Diwane Pyar Ke" with Mohammed Rafi
  - "Aaj Ka Din Bhi Phika Phika" with Mohammed Rafi
- Banke Sanwariya - "Kasan Khuda Ki Sanam" with Usha Mangeshkar
- Bombay Ka Chor -
  - " Jawaab De Ya Na De" with Kishore Kumar
  - "Hello Hello Ji, Kaho Kya Ji" with Kishore Kumar
  - "Naadan Hai Anjaan Hai"
- China Town -
  - "Yammaa Yammaa Yammaa Sau Paravaane Ik Shama" with Mohammed Rafi
  - "Humse Na Puchho Hum Kahan Chale" with Mohammed Rafi
  - "Ye Rang Na Chhootega Ulfat Ki Nishani" with Mohammed Rafi
  - "Humse Mat Poochho" with Mohammed Rafi
  - "Rangin Baharo Se Hai Gulzar China Town"
  - "Lakhon Hasino Se Hai"
- Dil Tera Diwana - "Rikshe Pe Mere, Tum Aa Baithe" with Mohammed Rafi
- Dilli Ka Dada -
  - "Dhundhe Nazar Nazar, Mera Chaand Hai Kidhar" with Mahendra Kapoor
  - "Humne Bhi Mohabbat Ki Thi" with Mahendra Kapoor
  - "Rimjhim Rimjhim Sawan Barse" with Manna Dey
  - "Aye Chingu Kya, Aye Shingu Kya" with Kamal Barot
- Dr. Vidya - "Aaye Hai Dilruba, Tujhko Kya Pata" with Geeta Dutt
- Ek Musafir Ek Hasina -
  - "Main Pyaar Ka Raahi Hoon" with Mohammad Rafi
  - "Aap Yunhi Agar Humse Milte Rahe" with Mohammad Rafi
  - "Bahut Shukriya Badi Meherbani" with Mohammad Rafi
  - "Kasam Khuda ki Yakeen Tumhe Mohabbat Hai" with Mohammad Rafi
  - "Teri Talash Mujhko Laayi Kahaan" with Mohammad Rafi
  - "Hamein Chahe Badnaam Kar De Zamana"
  - "Udhar Woh Chal Chalte Hai"
- Girls' Hostel -
  - "Yeh Haseen Raat, Ye Bahaar Yeh Sama" with Mohammed Rafi
  - "Sulajhaao Na Ulajhi Zulfon Ko" with Mukesh
  - "Main Akeli Meri Dildar Bahut"
  - "Chirage Ummid Jal Raha Hai"
- Gyara Hazar Ladkiyan -
  - "Sab Log Jidhar, Woh Hain Udhar"
  - "Gham Gaya Toh Gham Na Kar"
  - "Dil Ki Tamanna Thi" with Mohammed Rafi
- Hamen Bhi Jeene Do -
  - "Ankho Se Ankhe Khelengi"
  - "Pyari Tere Prano Ka Wo Pyara Hai"
- Hariyali Aur Rasta - "Parwanon Ki Raah Mein"
- Hong Kong -
  - "Tumhari Adao Pe Ae Husnwalo" with Mohammad Rafi
  - "O My God, Hasino Ko Kyun De Di" with Mohammad Rafi
  - "Honolulu"
  - "Dikhati Hoon Jidhar"
  - "Kenya Uganda Tanganyika"
  - "Hong Kong China Meena Singapore"
  - "Ho Jo Humkum To Meherbaan"
  - "Ye Zulfein Aawara"
  - "Muhabbat Karne Waala"
- Isi Ka Naam Duniya Hai -
  - "Akad Kar Ja Rahe Hai Jaiye" with Mohammed Rafi
  - "Aane Aane Do" with Sudha Malhotra
  - "Ya Habibi O Aa Karibi"
  - "Madhuban Mein Shyam Ki"
  - "Mujhko Sahara Denewale"
- Jadu Mahal -
  - "Jab Murali Baje Jamuna Pe" with Usha Mangeshkar
  - "Kali Ghata Jhume"
  - "Mujhe Aur De Saki"
- Jadugar Daku -
  - "Koi Pyar Bhari Dhun Chhed Piya" with Lata Mangeshkar
  - "Kali Julfe Gori Raat" with Mahendra Kapoor
  - "Rang Bhari Titli Hoon"
- Kala Samundar -
  - "Mahobbat Karo To Karo Chhup Chhupa" with Mohammed Rafi
  - "Meri Tasavir Lekar Kyaa Karoge Tum" with Mohammed Rafi
  - "Ja Re Ja Saiyan Bedardi, Mera Chain Churake"
  - "Aap Ki Baatein Aap Ki Kasme Sab Juthe"
  - "Chanda Ki Doli Taron Ki Toli"
  - "Duniya Ne Kaha Vahshi Tum Ne Kha Saudai"
- Madam Zorro -
  - "Pakdo Na Hath Mora Chod Mori Baiya"
  - "Mehfil Mein Bula Ke"
- Mall Road - "Humne Bhi Pyaar Kiya, Ankhiyon Ko Char Kiya" with Mohammed Rafi
- Man-Mauji -
  - "Murge Ne Jhooth Bola"
- Maya Jaal -
  - "Ya Rabu Chhoo Chhoo Mantra Chhoo"
  - "Ho Sa Ra Ra Ra Ki Mara"
  - "Sambhal Sambhal Ke Chalna" with Kamal Barot
  - "Mai Tumhara Ho Liya" with Mohammed Rafi
  - "Bach Ke Raho Haye Bach Ke Raho" with Usha Mangeshkar
- Naag Devta -
  - "Tere Hi Chhaya Me Huyi Thi Savitri Ki Jeet"
  - "Dharti Mata Ban Ke Sahara"
  - "Jhankar Payal Ki Taose Vinti Kare"
- Nakli Jawab -
  - "Nazar Teri Kaisi Badal Gayi Re"
  - "Hum Jispe Hai Fida Wo Kahi Aap To Nahin"
  - "Mast Ankhe Hai Ki Paimane Do" with Talat Mahmud
  - "Hum Diwane Tere Dar Se Nahi Talnewale" with Talat Mahmud
- Naughty Boy -
  - "Tum Mere Pehchane Phir Bhi Ho Anjaane"
  - "Ho Gayi Sham Dil Badnaam" with Manna Dey
  - "Jahaan Bhi Gaye Ham O Mere Hundum" with Kishore Kumar
  - "Ab To Batla Are Jalim" with Kishore Kumar
  - "Taar Dilo Ke Ab Jod Do" with Kishore Kumar
- Pathan -
  - "Bombay Central Par Gori" with Mahendra Kapoor
  - "O Hila Gaye, O Leharaye Re"
- Pick Pocket -
  - "Aage Pichhe Daye Baye Dil Ko Thame" with Mohammed Rafi
  - "Chhupi Chhupi Baat Dil Ki"
- Professor -
  - "Hamaare Gaon Koi Aayega" with Lata Mangeshkar
  - "Ye Umar Hai Kya Rangeeli" with Usha Mangeshkar, and Manna Dey
- Pyar Ki Jeet -
  - "O Oonchi Atariyawale, Lena Kabhi Hamari Khabariya"
  - "Bedard Anadi Sanwariya"
  - "Jaane Mere Akhiyon Ne Dekha Hai Kya" with Mohammed Rafi
  - "Is Jjag Mein Rakhiyo Kabhi Bhi" with Mohammed Rafi
- Raaz Ki Baat -
  - "Meri Gahghri Mein Ghungroo Laga De"
  - "Mujhko Pehchano, Mere Dard Ka Andaza Karo"
- Raj Nandini -
  - "Raat Aayi Hai Aanchal Mein Taare Liye" with Talat Mahmud
  - "Dil Chhed Koi Aisa Naghma"
  - "Jhoom Jhoom Ke Chali, Ulfat Ke Gali"
  - "Mera Jhoome Jiya, Jaise Hawa Mein Diya"
  - "Aaya Sawan Ke Tyohar Re"
- Rakhi -
  - "Dekho Mehnat Se Daulat Ki Yaari" with Mohammed Rafi
  - "Sitaro Aaj To Hum Bhi Tumhare Sath"
- Rashtraveer Shivaji -
  - "Aaye The Bigde Huye"
  - "Din Baar Baar Yeh Aaye"
  - "Yeh Kya Mulakat Huyi"
  - "Mubarak Aap Ko Ho"
- Reporter Raju -
  - "Mujhe Dekh Na Kudiye Mud Ke" with Mohammed Rafi
  - "Nazar Mili Hai Ek Katil Se" with Mohammed Rafi
- Sachche Moti -
  - "Chahe Dekhe Ghoorke, Chahe Deve Galiya" with Mohammed Rafi
  - "Sachche Ka Hai Bolbala" with Sudha Malhotra
- Sahib Bibi Aur Ghulam -
  - "Meri Baat Rahi Meri Man Men"
  - "Meri Jaan O Meri Jaan"
  - "Sakhiya Aaj Mujhe Neend Nahin"
  - "Bhanwara Bada Nadan"
- Sher Khan -
  - "Aise To Hume Dekha Na Karo" with Mahendra Kapoor
  - "Jug Jug Jiye Mera Bhaiya" with Kamal Barot
  - "Koi Kitna Hi Dil Ko Sambhale" with S. Balbir, and Mahendra Kapoor
  - "Yeh Baat Bade Hi Raaz Ki Hai" with Lata Mangeshkar
- Shiv Parvati -
  - "Koi Kali Khili Hogi" with Usha Mangeshkar
  - "Tum Hi Tum Din"
  - "Kiske Naino Ka Yeh Baan"
  - "Palko Ki Chhaon Mein Mamta Ka Palna (Happy)"
  - "Palko Ki Chhaon Me Mamta Ka Palna (Sad)"
  - "Kshama Karo Meri Bhool"
  - "More Laage Re" with Geeta Dutt
- Soorat Aur Seerat -
  - "Jaise Court Me Hakim Ki Chale Re Kalam"
  - "Garaj Ho To Nakhare Dikhati Hai Biwi"
- Tower House -
- Umeed -
  - "Thodi Si Uar Pee Le O Rangeele"
  - "Hamne Chaaha Magar Keh Na Paaye"
  - "Dil Ko Bachana Babuji" with Usha Mangeshkar
- Vallah Kya Baat Hai -
  - "Ek To Surat Pyaari Aur Upar Se Ye Naaz" with Mohammed Rafi
  - "Khanke To Khanke Kyon" with Mohammed Rafi
  - "Jab Raat Ko Chamke Taare" with Mohammed Rafi
  - "Mehfil Me Jo Aaye Tum"
  - "Teri Meri Ek Jindri Aa Ke Milja Re Mitva"

=== 1963 ===
- Aaj Aur Kal -
  - "Mujhe Gale Se Lagaa Lo" with Mohammed Rafi
  - "Mujhe Gale Se Laga Lo (female)"
  - "Maut Kitni Bhi Sangdil Ho"
  - "Mohe Chhedo Na Kanha Bajariya Mein"
  - "Raja Saheb Ghar Nahin" with Mahendra Kapoor
- Akela -
  - "Aaj Ki Raat Jawaan Allah Allah"
  - "Achchhi Surat Buri Nigaah"
  - "Paas Na Hove Jinki Roti"
  - "Rangeen Paani Ke Dhokhe Mein Aake"
  - "Ishq Mein Kya Sochna"
- Akeli Mat Jaiyo -
  - "Raste Mein Do Anjaane Aise Mile" with Mohammed Rafi
  - "Ye Cycle Ka Chakkar" with Mohammed Rafi
  - "Thodi Der Ke Liye Mere Ho Jao"
- Amar Rahe Yeh Pyaar -
  - "Mere Andhere Ghar Mrin Ek Chand Aaya"
  - "Lakhon Log Chale Hai Bilakhte" with Kavi Pradeep
- Awara Abdulla -
  - "Kahan Se Laayega Yeh Husn Yeh Shabab"
  - "Kabhi Meherbani Kabhi Badgumani"
  - "Dil Hai Zaalim Nigaahon Ka Maara" with Usha Mangeshkar
- Bahurani -
  - "Bane Aisa Samaj" with Lata Mangeshkar, and Manna Dey
  - "Yeh Husn Mera, Yeha Ishq Mera Rangeen"
- Bandini -
  - "Do Nainan Ke Milan Ko"
  - "Ab Ke Baras Bhejo"
- Begaana -
  - "Tose Nazar Ladi Sajna Re Mere Man"
  - "Pyar Nibhana Bhul Na Jana Sajan Salone"
  - "Sagar Ka Jhilmil Pani Machhariya Balkhati Jaye" with Manna Dey
- Bharosa -
  - "Dhadakaa O Dil Dhadka" with Lata Mangeshkar
  - "Kaahe Itna Guman Chhoriye" with Mohammed Rafi
  - "Kabhi Dushmani Kabhi Dosti" with Mohammed Rafi
- Bin Badal Barsaat -
  - "Dil Me Teri Yad Sanam Lab Pe Tera Nam" with Mohammed Rafi
  - "Bin Badal Barsaat Na Hogi"
- Captain Sheroo -
  - "Ishq Ki Manzil Badi Mushkil"
  - "Raat Ki Dulhan Saji"
  - "Jab Shammein Haseen Jalti Hai" with Mohammed Rafi
  - "Kiska Intezar Hai Janabe Man" with Mohammed Rafi
  - "Nazar Ko Milana Mila Kar Jhukana" with Usha Mangeshkar
- Chandrashekhar Azad - "Humse Nazrein Pher Ke Woh Kya Gaye"
- Cobra Girl -
  - "Aankh Mili To Dil Dhadka"
  - "Oye Hoy Oye Kar Gaya Dekho Jhutha Wada"
  - "Humein Sahara Ek Tihara"
  - "Jadugar Dekho Kaisa Ye Jadu" with Usha Mangeshkar
  - "Bada Pachtaye Najariya Mailaike" with Mohammed Rafi
- Commercial Pilot Officer -
  - "Rimjhim Rimjhim Kajri Badri Barkhane Laagi Re"
  - "Nashili Hawa Hai, Sama Hai Gulaabi" with Mohammed Rafi
- Daanveer Karan - "Har Dum Rahe Tu More Sang Mein" with Mohammed Rafi
- Dekha Pyaar Tumhara -
  - "Haay Re Haay Masoom Ishare" with Mohammed Rafi
  - "Chale Aana Sanam Uthaye Kadam"
- Dev Kanya -
  - "Pag Ghungharoo Bole Chhananan Chhum" with Mahendra Kapoor
  - "Zara Pehchano Toh Main Kaun" with Mukesh
  - "Saiyan Chhod De Mera Hath" with Mohammed Rafi
  - "Mata O Mata Jeevan Ki Data"
  - "O Sansar Banane Wale"
  - "Bole Jhan Jhan Jhan Payal Bole"
- Dil Hi To Hai -
  - "Parda Utthe Salaam Ho Jaaye" with Manna Dey
  - "Nigaahen Milaane Ko Jee Chahta Hai"
- Ek Tha Alibaba -
  - "Yehi Hai Tamanna Yehi Arzoo"
  - "Mehfil Ki Shama Ko Gul Kar Do" with Usha Mangeshkar
- Faulad -
  - "Paon Mein Jhanjhar"
  - "O Matware Saajna"
  - "Jaane Jaana Yun Na Dekho"
  - "Yaha To Kate Mauj Se Zindagi"
  - "Yaad Tori Aayi Main To Chham Chham Royi Re"
- Gehra Daag -
  - "Tumhe Paake Humne Jahaan Paa Liya Hai" with Mohammed Rafi
  - "Kaise Kahoon Main Baat Jiya Ki Sanwariya"
  - "Main Teri Hui Re Balma"
  - "Subah Kaa Bhoola Jab Shaam Ko Ghar Aa Jaye"
- Godaan - "Janam Liyo Lalna"
- Grihasti -
  - "Paayal Khul Khul Jaaye Ram Mori" with Mohammed Rafi
  - "Jaa Jaa Re Jaa Diwane" with Mohammed Rafi
  - "Khile Hain Sakhi Aaj Phulwa Man Ke" with Lata Mangeshkar, and Usha Mangeshkar
  - "Jeevan Jyot Jale"
- Gul-e-Bakavali -
  - "Yeh Kehdo tumhen Humse Kya Chahiye" with Surinder Kohli
  - "Allah Re Kisse Kahe Yeh Jawaani" with Usha Mangeshkar
- Gumrah -
  - "Aa Ja Aa Ja Re" with Mahendra Kapoor
  - "Tujhko Mera Pyar Pukare" with Mahendra Kapoor
  - "Ek Pardesi Door Se Aaya"
  - "Ek Thi Ladki Meri Saheli"
  - "Aa Ja Aa Ja Re" with Mahendra Kapoor
  - "Tujhko Mera Pyar Pukare" with Mahendra Kapoor
  - "Ek Pardesi Door Se Aaya"
  - "Ek Thi Ladki Meri Saheli"
- Harishchandra Taramati -
  - "Hum Jiye Ya Mare" with Usha Mangeshkar
  - "Yeh Jawaani Phir Nahin Aani" with Usha Mangeshkar
- Holiday in Bombay -
  - "Chhaliya Chhailya Pakad Ke Haath" with Usha Mangeshkar
  - "Pyar Ki Chandni Dil Ki Dushman Bani"
  - "Aye Chanda Dena Tu Gawahi" with Mohammed Rafi
- Jab Se Tumhen Dekha Hai -
  - "Are Re Dil Kho Gaya" with Manna Dey, Lata Mangeshkar, and Mohammed Rafi
  - "Mohammed Shah Rangile" with Manna Dey
- Kahin Pyaar Na Ho Jaaye - "Haye Kaisa Yeh Rog Laga Baithe" with Lata Mangeshkar
- Kaun Apna Kaun Paraya -
  - "Zindagi Bhar Yahi Ikraar Kiye Jayenge" with Mohammed Rafi
  - "Allah Kare, Main Bhi Dulhan Ban Jaun" with Shamshad Begum
  - "Aaya Bahar Ka Zamana"
- Kinare Kinare -
  - "Kadmon Mein Sama Ke Parwane"
  - "Chhaliya Teri Baaton Baaton Mein"
- Magic Box -
  - "Teri Mast Nigabon Ne Banaya Hai" with Mohammed Rafi
  - "Gheere Ghata Ghanghor, Saiyan Aaja"
  - "Raat Pyaar Ka Mila, Chand Kuchh Aur Khila"
  - "Kahan Ho Dilwale, Aa Gayi Husn Ki Toliya" with Jani Babu Qawwal
- Mere Arman Mere Sapne -
  - "Unse Pehchan Huyo Jaati Hai"
  - "Dheere Dheere Bol Mere Paayal Ke Ghungroo"
  - "Ek Ladki To Kya" with Usha Mangeshkar
  - "Hai Badi Zor Ki Dhoop" with Mohammed Rafi
  - "Aankh Hamari Ho, Sapne Tumhari Ho" with Mohammed Rafi
- Meri Surat Teri Ankhen - "Mujhse Nazar Milane Mein"
- Mere Mehboob -
  - "Mere Mehboob Mein Kya Nahin" with Lata Mangeshkar
  - "Janeman Ek Nazar Dekh Le" with Lata Mangeshkar
- Mujhe Jeene Do -
  - "Maang Mein Bhar Le Rang Sakhi Ri"
  - "Moko Pihar Me Mat Chhed Re Balam"
  - "Nadi Naare Na Jaao Shaam"
- Mulzim -
  - "Sang Sang Rahenge Tumhare O Huzur (Happy)" with Mohammed Rafi
  - "Aate Hi Jawani Ka Mausam"
- Naag Jyoti -
  - "Mana Tum Na Rahoge Mana Hum Na Rahenge" with Mohammed Rafi
  - "Jatatavi Galat Jalab Pravah Pavit Sthale"
- Nartaki -
  - "Aaj Duniya Badi Suhaani Hai"
  - "Tumne Ankhon Se Pee Ho Toh"
  - "Insaan Mohabbat Mein"
  - "Zindagi Uljhanon Ko Bhool Kar"
- Patal Nagri -
  - "Apni Garaj Pakad Lini"
  - "Chanchal Jiyara Nahi More Bas Mein"
  - "Jab Tum Mile Toh Kuch Gul Khile"
  - "Jiya Mera Jhum Jhum Nache Re"
- Phir Wohi Dil Laya Hoon -
  - "Door Bahutat Jaiye" with Mohammed Rafi
  - "O Hamdam Mere Khel Na Jano" with Mohammed Rafi
  - "Zulf Ki Chhaaon Mein" with Mohammed Rafi
  - "Mujhe Pyar Me Tum Na Ilzaam Dete"
  - "Ankhon Se Jo Utri Hai"
  - "Dekho Bijalee Dole Bin Baadal Ke" with Usha Mangeshkar
- Pyaar Kiya Toh Darna Kya -
  - "Mohabbat Ka Naghma Zubaan Par Na Aata" with Mohammed Rafi
  - "Mera Dil Aashiqana Hai" with Mohammed Rafi
  - "Dil Tumko De Diya" with Mohammed Rafi
  - "Duniya Mein Mohabbat Walon Ki"
  - "Baharon Ki Kahani, Sunati Hai Jawani"
- Pyar Ka Bandhan -
  - "Meri Pahali Aarazu Ka" with Mohammed Rafi
  - "Aa Meri Ankhon Ki Gehrayi Mein" with Mohammed Rafi
  - "Zaraa Bach Ke O Baliye" with Mahendra Kapoor
  - "Ek Pyar Ke Bandhan Ki Khatir (sad)"
  - "Ek Pyar Ke Bandhan Ki Khatir (happy)"
- Raja -
  - "Tadpe Is Karvat Se Us Karvat"
  - "Aisi Bhi Kya Jaldi Hai, Thehro Zara"
  - "Idhar Bijli Udhar Shola"
  - "Hum Akele Yahan Reh Gaye The"
- Razia Sultana -
  - "Dhalti Jaaye Raat, Keh Le Dil Ki Baat" with Mohammed Rafi
  - "Kehna Naa Mano Main Jawani Ka"
  - "Aaja Re Deewane Aaja Re Deewane"
  - "Nahin Hai Koi Bada Husn Se Zamane Mein" with Mahendra Kapoor
- Rustom-E-Baghdad -
  - "Chehra Lal Lal Hai Badli Hui Chal Hai"
  - "Yeh Baat Nahin Hai, Kahen Ki Hum"
- Rustam Sohrab - "Ab Der Ho Gayi Wallah"
- Sehra -
  - "Hum Hai Nashe Mein"
- Shikari -
  - "Yeh Rangeen Mehfil Gulaabi Gulaabi"
  - "Maangi Hain Duaaen Hamane Sanam" with Usha Mangeshkar
- Taj Mahal -
  - "Chaandi Kaa Badan Sone Ki Nazar" with Manna Dey, Meena Kapoor, and Mohammed Rafi
  - "Husn Se Hai Dunia Hasin"
- Tarzan Aur Jadugar -
  - "Khayalon Mein Tum Ho"
  - "Pyaar Ke Parwanon Ko"
  - "Raja Munne Pyare"
  - "Yeh Kaisa Sama Hai, Yeh Kaisi Fiza"
  - "Reshmi Ghataon Ke Kaafile" with Mahendra Kapoor
- Tere Ghar Ke Samne - "Dil Ki Manzil Kuchh Aisi Hai"
- Ustadon Ke Ustad -
  - "Milte Hi Nazar Tumse" with Mohammed Rafi, and Manna Dey
  - "Raat Chup Hain, Chandni Madhosh Hain" with Ravi
  - "Mere Dil Ko Jiski Talash Thi" with Mohammed Rafi
  - "Maine Kaha Tha Aana Sunday Ko" with Mohammed Rafi
- Yeh Dil Kisko Doon -
  - "Tera Naam Mera Naam" with Mohammed Rafi
  - "Kitni Hasin Ho Tum" with Mohammed Rafi
  - "Kya Hua Maine Agar Ishq Ka Izhaar Kiya" with Mohammed Rafi
  - "Hume Dum Dai Ke Sautan Ghar Jana" with Mubarak Begum
  - "Main Gavalin Chatki"
  - "Wah Re Dildaar Banke Tum Pe"
  - "Mai Hu Pyare Teri Diwani"
- Yeh Raste Hain Pyaar Ke -
  - "Yeh Khamoshiyan Yeh Tanhaiyan" with Mohammed Rafi
  - "Yeh Raaste Hain Pyar Ke"
  - "Jane Chali Kaha Aaj Yeh Meri Zindagi"
  - "Gunaaho Ka Diya Tha Haque"
  - "Jane Jana Paas Aao" with Sunil Dutt
- Zarak Khan -
  - "Sham Ki Tanhaiyan Hain"
  - "Nazar Ne Intezar-e-Yaar Mein Dhokhe Bade Khaye"
  - "Nakara Bola Yeh Dil Ka Shola"
- Zingaro -
  - "Mohabbat Mein Sab Kuchh Lutaate Chalo"
  - "Madhosh Hoke Hum To Chale" with Mahendra Kapoor

=== 1964 ===
- Aap Ki Parchhaiyan -
  - "Kabhi Ithla Ke Chalte Ho" with Mohammed Rafi
  - "Jab Tak Ke Hai Akash Pe Chand Aur Sitare"
- Apne Huye Paraye - "Kahin Ansoo Nikalte Hai"
- Awara Badal -
  - "Aamna Samna Tose Jab" with Kamal Barot
  - "Chhanke Mori Payal"
  - "Dil To Nirala Hi Sharabi Hai"
  - "Ek Hai Dil Pyar Bhara Kis Ko Mai Du"
  - "Parwane Teri Shama Jal Uthi"
- Ayee Milan Ki Bela - "Aa Ha Ayee Milan Ki Bela" with Mohammed Rafi
- Badshah -
  - "Kuch Tumhe Aur Bhi Aata Hai"
  - "Rahenge Jab Tak Khamosh Hum"
  - "Eji Maine Kaha Suniye To Zara Ek Baat"
  - "Ankhon Mein Tum Ho Samaye"
  - "Nigaahen Aur Chaahe Toh Hamara" with Poorna Seth
- Baghi -
  - "Sakhiya Mera Ek Kaam Kar De" with Usha Mangeshkar
  - "Eid Ki Raat Pyaar Layi Hai"
- Baghi Shahzada -
  - "Udi Udi Jau Mai Udi Udi Jau"
  - "Ja Ja Ja Re Dilbar"
  - "Hans Rahi Zindagi Har Taraf"
- Benazir -
  - "Mubarak Ho Woh Dil Jisko" with Lata Mangeshkar, and Usha Mangeshkar
  - "Gham Nahij Gar Zibdagi Veeran Hai"
- Beti Bete - "Gori Chalo Na Hanske Chal" with Mohammed Rafi
- Cha Cha Cha -
  - "Ik Chamelee Key Mandave Tale" with Mohammed Rafi
  - "Tumse Mano Na Mano" with Mohammed Rafi
- Challenge -
  - "Pukaren Kab Se Tumko" with Mukesh
  - "Mohabbat Ne Kiya Badnaam"
  - "Din Hai Suhane Albele"
- Chandi Ki Deewar -
  - "Laage Tohse Nain" with Talat Mahmud
  - "Ka Se Kul Duniya Humari"
  - "Jo Kahe Se Tum Sharmaati Ho" with Mohammed Rafi
- Char Darvesh -
  - "Le Liya Dil Mera Le Liya"
  - "Tadpa Le Jitna Chahe" with Usha Mangeshkar
  - "Kali Kali Ankho Me Chamak Gayi Bijli"
- Chitralekha -
  - "Kahin Tarsaye Jiyara" with Usha Mangeshkar
  - "Chha Gaye Badal Nil Gagan Par" with Mohammed Rafi
- Daal Mein Kala -
  - "Mohabbat Karna Hai Asan" with C. Ramchandra, and Kishore Kumar
  - "In Ankhon Ko Tumhen Apna Banane Ki Tamanna Hai"
  - "Samjhe Na Dil Ki Lagi Sajan"
  - "Tum Chale Aaye Badi Meherbani"
  - "Do Ankhen Janani, Do Ankhen Mardani" with Kishore Kumar
- Dara Singh -
  - "Chhodo Mori Baiya Balma Beimaan Re"
  - "Rasiya O Rasiya Re Nimbuaa Mangaye De" with Mahendra Kapoor
  - "Ghazab Ho Gaya Re, Julam Ho Gayi" with Shamshad Begum
- Dooj Ka Chand - "Sajan Salona Maang Lo Ji Koi" with Lata Mangeshkar
- Door Gagan Ki Chhaon Mein -
  - "Path Bhula Ik Aaya Musafir"
  - "Khoya Khoya Chanda Khoye Khoye Taare"
  - "Chhod Meri Baiyya Balam"
- Door Ki Awaaz -
  - "Haathon Men Haath Honthon Pe Afasaane Pyaar Ke" with Mohammed Rafi
  - "Mohe Tirchhi Najariya Na Maro"
  - "Tut Gayi Mere Man Ki Muraliya"
  - "Duniya Kehti Happy Birthday To You" with Mohammed Rafi, and Manna Dey
- Ek Din Ka Badshah -
  - "Tere Hathon Mein Apne Zindagi Ke Sej Dete Hai (duet)" with Mahendra Kapoor
  - "Bandanawaz Dekhiye Aisa Na Kijiye" with S. Balbir, Miss Vijay, Surender Kohli, Kishore Sharma, and Mohammed Rafi
- Ganga Ki Lehren - "Dekho Ri Koi Kaminiya"
- Gazal -
  - "Ada Qaatil, Nazar Barq-e-Aala"
- Geeta Gaaya Pattharon Ne -
  - "Aaiye Padhariye" with Mahendra Kapoor
  - "Sanson Ke Tar Par" with Mahendra Kapoor
  - "Tere Khayaalon Mein Hum"
  - "Aaja Jaanejan Mere Meherbaan"
  - "Raat Naujawan"
  - "Janaewale O Mere Pyar"
- Haqdaar - "Kanha Mohe Murli Se Chhal Gayo Re" with Usha Mangeshkar
- Hameer Haath -
  - "Na Jeene Ki Ijaazat Hai"
- Hercules -
  - "Ho Gaya Hai Kuch Hame Bhi"
  - "Na Idhar Dekhna Na Udhar Dekhna"
  - "Dekh Dekh Chal Ek Ek Pal"
  - "Iss Jawani Se Tauba Mastani Se Tauba"
- His Highness -
  - "Aa Ja Re Ankh To Sharmaye Haye"
  - "Ankh Ladi Dil Mein Gadi Zulmi Nazar"
  - "Has Ke Na Jina Julm Hai Balam"
  - "Kaha Khoye Radha Ke Saware"
  - "Nainawale Yeh Kaise Dore Daale"
- Idd Ka Chand -
  - "Dil Uski Mohabbat Mein"
  - "Ae Bekason Ki Aankg Ke Taare Salaam Le"
- Jahan Ara - "Jab Jab Tumhen Bulaaya" with Lata Mangeshkar
- Jantar Mantar -
  - "Kya Kahe Tujhse Mohabbat Ho Gayi"
  - "Jaanewale Laut Ke Aan"
  - "Ek Diwana Aayega Ek Mastana" with Kamal Barot
- Kaise Kahoon - "Kisi Ke Mohabbat Mein Sab Kuchh Bhula Ke" with Mohammed Rafi
- Kashmir Ki Kali -
  - "Isharon Isharon Mein Dil Lenewale" with Mohammed Rafi
  - "Haay Re Haay, Yeh Mere Haath Mein Tera Haath" with Mohammed Rafi
  - "Deewana Hua Badal, Sawan Ki Ghata Chhay" with Mohammed Rafi
  - "Balma Khuli Hawa Mein"
  - "Phir Thes Lagi Dil Ko"
- Khufia Mahal -
  - "Mere Dil Mein Bhara Hai Pyaar" with Usha Mangeshkar
  - "Pyaar Hoga Ji, Iqraar Hoga Ji"
- Kohra - "Kaahe Bajayi Tune Paapi Bansuriya" with Mahendra Kapoor
- Leader -
  - "Daiya Re Daiya Laaj Mohe Laage"
  - "Aajkal Shauq-E-Deedar Hai" with Mohammed Rafi
- Magic Carpet -
  - "Pyaar Ki Baaten Koyi Na Jaane" with Mohammed Rafi
  - "O Saiyan Bepir Koyi Teer Na Chalana"
- Maharani Padmini - "Unse Kehdo, Kankhaiyon Se Na Dekhe" with Kamal Barot
- Main Bhi Ladki Hoon -
  - "Aaye The Huzoor Bade Tan Ke (Female)"
  - "Yahi To Din Hai Baharo Ke" with Mohammed Rafi
- Main Suhagan Hoon -
  - "Gori Tere Nainwa Kajar Bin Kare Kaee" with Mohammed Rafi
  - "Tu Shokh Hawa Main Mast Pawan" with Mohammed Rafi
  - "Hum Bhi The Anjaan Se" with Sudha Malhotra
- Phoolon Ki Sej -
  - "Aaj Ki Raat Mohabbat Ka Nasha" with Lata Mangeshkar
  - "Pyar Ko Madhur" with Mohammed Rafi
- Pooja Ke Phool -
  - "Hey Jhummalo, O Baba Jhummalo" with Mohammed Rafi
  - "Ab Do Dilo Ki Mushkil Aasaan Ho Gayi Hai" with Mohammed Rafi
  - "Banda Paravar Ho Rat Ke Andhere Mein Yun"
- Punar Milan -
  - "In Pyar Ki Rahon Mein" with Mohammed Rafi
  - "Na Jane Kaun Ye Aawaz Deta Hai"
  - "Ruk Ja O Jaanewale"
- Qawwali Ki Raat -
  - "Husnwale Husn Ka Anjam Dekh" with Mohammed Rafi
  - "Aa Main Bataun Tu Hai Kya" with Mohammed Rafi
  - "Pyar Ki Hasraten Khaak Mein Mil Gayi" with Mohammed Rafi
  - "Kehnewale Tu Bhi Keh Le" with Mohammed Rafi, and Manna Dey
  - "Maula Tere Karam Kaa"
- Rahul - "Dim Dim Dim Digo, Ham Waka Gabru Igo"
- Rajkumar -
  - "Dilruba Dil Pe Tu" with Lata Mangeshkar
  - "Naach Re Mann Badkamma" with Mohammed Rafi
- Roop Sundari - "Pyaar Kar Le, Mila Le Nazar"
- Rustom-e-Rome -
  - "Jab Se Dekha Tumhen" with Mahendra Kapoor
  - "Ye Bahakti Ghataye" with Mohammed Rafi
  - "Pila De Aaj Paimana, Bana De Humko Diwana"
- Samson -
  - "Tere Deed Se Tasalli"
  - "Poochho Na Hame Ishq Mein Kya Hoga" with Manna Dey, and Mahendra Kapoor
- Sanjh Aur Savera - "Jiske Liye Tadpe Hum" with Mohammed Rafi
- Sarfarosh -
  - "Phool Muskuraye Kyun"
- Shabnam - "Anadi Hai Shikari Dekho Dillagi" with Usha Mangeshkar
- Sharabi -
  - "Jaao Ji Jaao, Dekhe Hain Bade Tum Jaise" with Mohammed Rafi
  - "Tum Ho Hasin Kahan Ke" with Mohammed Rafi
- Shehnai -
  - "Sadiyon Purani Apni Kahani" with Mohammed Rafi
  - "Is Tarah Toda Mera Dil"
  - "Pawan More Angna Mein"
- Subhadra Haran -
  - "Reh Gayi Main Dekhti"
  - "Aaya Basant Hai Aaya"
  - "Sune Naa Koi Man Ki Vyatha"
  - "Kaminiyo Ko Riza Raha Jo"
  - "Milan Ki Jaag Uthi Bhavna" with Mahendra Kapoor
- Suhagan - "Aayi Dulhan Badi Albeli Mehekti"
- Tarzan Aur Jalpari -
  - "Kaun Tum, Tunhi Mere Zindagi Mein Pyaar"
  - "Geet Hue Hain Ghazal"
- Teen Dost -
  - "Ho Gayi Balma" with Manna Dey
  - "Zara Pyaar Karke Dekh"
- Tere Dwaar Khada Bhagwan -
  - "Baadrawa Kare Jahaan Sajan Hamare"
  - "Main Chahun Tumhen Dekhun Saiyan"
  - "Mere Akhiyon Se Dil Mein Tu Aa Rasiya"
  - "Tere Bina Insaaf Mera Kaun Karega" with Mohammed Rafi
- Veer Bhimsen -
  - "Mai Tum Pe Teer Chala Doon"
  - "Aayi Aaj Bida Ki Bela"
  - "Sakshi Rehna Dharti Mata"
  - "Dekho Ji Dekho Meri Ankh"
  - "Jiske Pyaar Mein Aatho Pahar Main" with Mahendra Kapoor
- Woh Kaun Thi? -
  - "Shokh Nazar Ki Bijliyan"
  - "Tiki Riki Tiki Riki Takori" with Mohammed Rafi
- Ziddi - "Champakali Dekho Jhuk Hi Gayi" with Mohammed Rafi
- Zindagi -
  - "Ghungharva Mora, Chham Chham Baaje" with Mohammed Rafi
  - "Aaj Bhagwan Ke Charanon Mein" with Mohammed Rafi
  - "Chhune Na Dungi Haath Re" with Lata Mangeshkar

=== 1965 ===
- Aadhi Raat Ke Baad - "Kaafir Nazar Takrayi, Dil Ki Huyi Ruswayi" with Mohammed Rafi
- Aakash Deep -
  - "Jaa Raha Hoon Zindagi Se Door" with S. Balbir, and Manna Dey
  - "Gudiya Banke Naachun" with Usha Mangeshkar
- Adventures of Robinhood -
  - "Jawaan Jawaan Husn Ke Rangin Ye Khafile" with Mohammed Rafi
  - "Chik Chari O Chari"
- Amar Jyoti - "Aji O O Saajan Jeevan Bhar Hum Tum Saath Rahe" with Mahendra Kapoor
- Arzoo -
  - "Adab Arz Hai" with Mubarak Begum
- Baghi Haseena -
  - "Bholo Soorat Pe Na Jaana"
  - "Ye Ada Ya Jawaani"
- Bahu Beti -
  - "Rangeen Fiza Hai Aaja" with Mahendra Kapoor
  - "Meri Mang Ke Rang Mein"
  - "Aaj Hai Karva Chauth"
  - "Bharat Maa Ki Aankh Ke Taaro"
- Bedaagh -
  - "Aankho Aankho Me Naa Jane Kya" with Mohammed Rafi
  - "Nikolasa Mere Sanam Jhum Le Zara Sa"
  - "Bedhadak Dalo Rang Dalo DaRoshan"
- Bekhabar -
  - " Karte Ho Mujhse Kitni Mohabbat" with Mohammed Rafi
  - "Kyon Chamke Bijiriya Saawan Ki"
  - "Idhar Humne Pee Lo Koi Shai Nasheeli"
- Bhakt Prahlad -
  - " Pag Ghungroo Baandh Lehraoon Gaoon"
  - "Raat Basanti Mein Rasvanti Laayi Hoon"
  - "Laal Mere Na Jaa" with Usha Mangeshkar
- Bheegi Raat - "Uff O Tera Baakpan"
- Bhool Na Jaana -
  - "Jhuka Lo Bade Bade Naina"
- Bombay Race Course -
  - "Yeh Kaun Hai Jo Meri Zindagi Mein Aane Laga"
  - "Balam Kabhi Aa, Sajan Kabhi Aa"
  - "Pehle Khoon Kharaba, Peechhe Daur Sharaba"
- Boxer -
  - "Tune Jo Samjha Hai Mujhko Ae Jaan-e-Wafa"
  - "Jaanun Na Jaanun Na, Kasto Ooncho Pyaar"
- Chand Aur Suraj -
  - "Meri Aur Unki Preet Purani"
  - "Baag Mein Kali Khili"
- Char Chakram - "O Babu Sun Sun Sun Zara"
- Ek Saal Pehle -
  - "Nazar Utha Ke Yeh Rangeen Sama Rahe Na Rahe" with Talat Mahmud
- Flying Man - "Chand Ko Chand Keh Diya Humne" with Mohammed Rafi
- Gopal Krishna -
  - "Na Jaao Re Kanhaiya"
  - "Raswanti Naar Aayi Saaj Ke"
- Gumnaam - "Pee Ke Hum Tum Jo"
- Hum Diwane -
  - "Pyar Ki Pehli Mulaqaaton Mein" with C. Ramchandra
  - "Suno Husn Walo Ka Humse Fasana" with C. Ramchandra
  - "Kabhi Laya Jhumke Na" with C. Ramchandra
  - "Humse Ye Dil Kahta Hai" with Mahendra Kapoor
  - "O Janeman Jane Jaan"
  - "Zulm Hua Haye Sitam Hua"
- Hum Sab Ustad Hain -
  - "Aha Kya Teri Zulfen Hain" with Kishore Kumar
  - "Uff Yeh Nikhra Huwa Chehra" with Kishore Kumar
- Jadui Angoothi - "Hawa Lehraye Haye Re"
- Jahan Sati Wahan Bhagwan -
  - "Meri Payal Jhanke Baar Baar"
  - "Dukhiya Nari Kise Pukare"
  - "Din Bite Ladakpan Ke" with Madhukar Rajasthani
- Janwar -
  - "Dekho Ab To Kisi Ko Nahi Hai Khabar" with Balbir, and Mohammed Rafi
  - "Raat Yun Dil Me Teri Khoyi Hui Yaad Aayi" with Mohammed Rafi
  - "Ankhon Ankhon Mein Kisi Se Baat Hui Hai" with Manna Dey, and Lata Mangeshkar
- Kaajal -
  - "Cham Cham Ghungaru Bole Dekho"
  - "Tora Man Darpan Kehlaye"
  - "Mere Bhaiya, Mere Chanda, Mere Anamol Ratan"
  - "Samajhi Thi Ke Ye Ghar Mera Hai"
  - "Agar Mujhe Na Mili Tum To Mai Ye Samjhunga" with Mahendra Kapoor
  - "Zara Si Aur Pila Do Bhang" with Mohammed Rafi
  - "Kabiraa Nirbhay Raam Jape" with Mohammed Rafi
- Khakaan -
  - "Kiya Jo Ishq Toh Hum Ho Haye Deewane Se" with Mohammed Rafi, and Kamal Barot
  - "Aapki Khayalon Mein Khoye"
  - "Jaadu Kar Gayi Hai Nazar"
- Khandan -
  - "Neel Gagan Par Udte Badal" with Mohammed Rafi
  - "O Ballo, Sochke Mele Jana" with Mohammed Rafi
  - "Aa Dance Karen, Thoda Romance Karen" with Mohammed Rafi
  - "Meri Mitti Mein Mil Gayi Jawani" with Usha Mangeshkar
- Mahabharat - "Champakali Chhup Chhup Jaye Re"
- Maharaja Vikram -
  - "Chale Aao Ji Meri Gali Saiyan"
  - "Nirdayi Insaan"
  - "Baaje Re" with Usha Mangeshkar
- Mahasati Anusuya -
  - "Maar Nazar Tadpaye"
  - "Man Mera Jhule Re"
- Main Hoon Aladdin - "Ae Haseena Main Tujhi Se Pyaar Karta Hoon" with Mohammed Rafi
- Mere Sanam -
  - "Hamane To Dil Ko Aapake Kadamon Pe Rakh Diya" with Mohammed Rafi
  - "Roka Kai Baar Maine" with Mohammed Rafi
  - "Haan Ji Baba" with Mohammed Rafi
  - "Jaaiye Aap Kahaan Jaayenge"
  - "Yeh Hai Reshmi"
- Mohabbat Isko Kehte Hain -
  - "Aji Tum Kitne Haseen Ho"
  - "Humse Hoti Mohabbat Jo Tumko" with Mukesh
- Mujrim Kaun Khooni Kaun - "Dekh Dekh Duniya Ke Rang"
- Nai Umar Ki Nai Fasal -
  - "Aaj Ki Raat Badi Natkhat (duet)" with Mohammed Rafi
- Namaste Ji -
  - "Aasman Gulabi Huyi"
  - "Koi Zalim Baharo Ke Bich"
- Nartaki Chitra - "Le Gayo Baaton Mein" with Manna Dey
- Naya Kanoon -
  - "Lijiye Dil Ka Nazarana" with Mohammed Rafi
  - "Unhein Kissa-E-Gham Likhne Ko Baithe"
  - "Aankh Mein Rehte Hai Woh"
  - "Meri Rakhi Ki Rakhiyo Tu Aan Re"
  - "Mere Rasiya, Mere Man Basiya"
- Neela Akash -
  - "In Aankhon Se Nazar Ka Teer"
  - "Preet Basi Hai Meri Nas Nas Mein"
  - "Mere Dil Se Aake Lipat Gayi" with Mohammed Rafi
  - "Tere Paas Aa Ke Mera Waqt Gujar Jata Hai" with Mohammed Rafi
  - "Aap Ko Pyaar Chhupaane Kee Buree Aadat Hain" with Mohammed Rafi
- Oonche Log - "Kaisi Tune Reet Rachi Bhagwan" with Manna Dey
- Phir Wohi Shaam (unreleased) -
  - "Phir Wohi Shaam (female)"
- Poonam Ki Raat -
  - "Bhole Piya Jane Kya Tumne Kiya"
  - "Ta Deem Tana Deem"
- Raaka -
  - "Hum Bhi Naye Tum Bhi Naye" with Manna Dey, Mohammed Rafi, and Kamal Barot
  - "Teri Meharbani Hogi Teri Meharbani" with Mohammed Rafi
  - "Koi Mila Raah Mein Aur Dil Kho Gaya"
  - "Ho Nain Se Nain Uljh Gaye Re Saiya"
- Rustom-e-Hind -
  - "Nazar Meri Badhi Idhar Se"
  - "Raja Ji Tore Raj Me Gujari Maine Ratiya"
- Saat Samandar Paar -
  - "Ek Baat Meri Manige Sanam"
  - "Bairi Balma Mora Jia Leke Jaaye" with Usha Mangeshkar
  - "Chori Chori Aap Pe Dil Aaya" with Usha Mangeshkar
- Sangram - "Tik Zik Zunga Ki Zunga"
- Sant Tukaram -
  - "Yeh Poonam Ki Chandni" with Manna Dey
- Sati Nari - "Mera Bujhta Hua Deep Jala De"
- Shahi Lutera -
  - "Ho Gaya Dil Pe Mere Tere Nigaahon Ka Ishaara" with Mohammed Rafi
- Shankar Sita Anusuya -
  - "Ayodhya Ki Maaon Zara Aaj Rona" with Kamal Barot
  - "Meri Rang Rangili Jawani" with Kamal Barot
  - "Raja Ram Ke Beto Phate Aasan Pe Tum"
  - "Hey Kirano Ke Raja Na Karo"
  - "Tu Pritam Se Karle Pyar"
- Sher Dil -
  - "Shikwa Hai Mere Dil Ke Sun Le Jahanwale"
  - "Khayalon Mein Woh Ab Toh Aane Lage"
  - "Hansta Hua Gulaab Hoon"
  - "Sambhal Ke Aana Mukaabil Mein Husnwalon Ke" with C. Ramchandra
- Shree Ram Bharat Milan -
  - "He Parakrami Surya Devta" with Kamal Barot
  - "Yehi Raho" with Usha Mangeshkar
- Sikander-e-Azam -
  - "O More Gore Badan Pe Gulabi Nazariya Na Daal" with Usha Mangeshkar
  - "Pilaai Tune O Sakiya"
- Sindbad Alibaba Aladdin -
  - "Lai Lai Maula Lai Lai" with Minoo Purushottam, and Usha Mangeshkar
  - "Kya Jawan Raat Hai Baharo Ki" with Mohammed Rafi
  - "Layi Bhar Ke Muhabbat Ke Jam" with Usha Mangeshkar
  - "Banda Parwar Mohabbat Ka Salam Le Lijiye" with Manna Dey, and Mohammed Rafi
  - "Ye Hasin Nazare Muntzil Hai Sare"
  - "Mera Naam Jinny"
  - "Aaj Hai Gulfam Se Bhi Badhkar Teri Shaan"
- Tarzan And Circus -
  - "Chand Hai Mehman Ae Dil Aaj Ki Is Rat Ka"
  - "Meri Zulfo Ki Chhao Tale"
  - "Gar Hata Do Ae Sanam Parda Zara" with Mahendra Kapoor
  - "Meri Bulbul Karti Chulbul" with Mahendra Kapoor
- Tarzan Comes To Delhi -
  - "Kaari Kaari Ankhiyon Se" with Mohammed Rafi
  - "Dil Laga Le Dilwale Tujhe Samjhati Hai" with Usha Mangeshkar
  - "Chham Chham Baje Payal Matwali" with Usha Mangeshkar
  - "Nigahen Chaar Karun Yehi Meri Tamanna Hai"
- Teen Devian - "Arre Yaar Meri Ho Tum Bhi Ghajab" with Kishore Kumar
- Teen Sardar -
- Teesra Kaun -
  - "Achha Sanam Kar Le Sitam"
  - "O Dilruba Tu Muskura"
- Tu Hi Meri Zindagi -
  - "Jidhar Bhi Main Dekhun" with Mohammed Rafi
  - "Suhana Sama Tum Kaha Hum Yahan" with Mohammed Rafi
  - "Mere Watan Ka Hai Tu (Sad)"
  - "Yeh Kaun Thak Ke So Raha Hai"
  - "Mere Watan Ka Hai Tu (Happy)"
- Waqt -
  - "Maine Dekha Hai Ki Phoolon Se" with Mahendra Kapoor
  - "Hum Jab Simat Ke Aapki" with Mahendra Kapoor
  - "Din Hai Bahaar Ke" with Mahendra Kapoor
  - "Chehre Pe Khushi Chhaa Jaati Hai"
  - "Kaun Aaya Ke Nigahon Mein"
  - "Aage Bhi Jaane Na Tu"
- Zindagi Aur Maut -
  - "Dil Lagakar Ham Ye Samjhe (female)"
  - "Zindagi Aur Maut Dono Ek Hai"
  - "Teri Najro Ka Ishara Mil Gaya"
  - "Zara Dekh Mohabat Karke"

=== 1966 ===
- Aasra - "Mere Soone Jeevan Ka Aasra Hai Tu"
- Aaye Din Bahar Ke -
  - "Aye Kaash Kisi Diwane Ko" with Lata Mangeshkar
  - "Khat Likh De Sawariya Ke Naam"
- Afsana -
  - "Milne Ki Rut Andhiyayi Re"
  - "Kitni Hai Albelu Zulfen Teri Saheli"
- Ajnabi -
  - "Na Jaane Baat Kya Hai"
  - "Na Jaane Baat Kya Hai Jo"
- Akalmand -
  - "Sach Kahun I Love You Very Much"
  - "Jab Do Dil Ho Bechain" with Shamshad Begum
  - "Balma Sajna Duniya Bhula Di" with Usha Mangeshkar
- Alibaba & 40 Thieves -
  - "Dil Ki Jazbaat Mohabbat Ki Khushi Aapse Hai" with Usha Mangeshkar
  - "Main Masum Dil Masum"
  - "Alibaba Alibaba"
- Anupama -
  - "Kyon Mujhe Itni Khushi"
  - "Bheegi Bheegi Faza"
- Badal -
  - "Nain Bedardi Chhaliya Ke Sang Gaaye"
  - "Aapko Jo Dekhega, Pyaar Hi Se Dekhega" with Bhupinder Singh
- Baharen Phir Bhi Aayegi -
  - "Suno Suno Miss Chatterjee" with Mohammed Rafi
  - "Dil To Pehle Hi Se Madhosh Hai" with Mohammed Rafi
  - "Koi Kehde Zamane Se Jaake"
  - "Woh Hanske Mile Humse"
  - "Badal Jaaye Agar Maali (Sad)"
- Biradari - "Sagaar Ko Choom"
- Biwi Aur Makaan -
  - "Aise Daaton Mein Ungliya Chubhao Nahi" with Usha Mangeshkar
  - "Dabe Labon Se Kabhi Jo Koi" with Lata Mangeshkar
- Budtameez - "Sirf Tum Hi To Ho" with Mohammed Rafi
- Chale Hain Sasural -
  - "Nayi Nayi Pehchan"
- Chhota Bhai - "Baaje Mridang, Kanha Khele Rang"
- Daadi Maa -
  - "Maine Aur Kya Kiya, Balam Yahi To Kah Diya"
  - "Jaane Na Dunga, Na Jaane Dunga" with Manna Dey
- Dada - "Saawan Ka Mausam Hai"
- Daku Mangal Singh -
  - "Pyaar Kiya Hai Humne Jise"
- Devar - "Mushkil Mein Padh Gayi Jaan" with Usha Mangeshkar
- Dil Diya Dard Liya -
  - "Sawan Aaye Ya Na Aaye" with Mohammed Rafi
  - "Rasiya Tu Bada Bedardi"
  - "Dil Haarnewale Aur Bhi Hai"
- Dil Ne Phir Yaad Kiya -
  - "Humein Toh Khushi Hain"
  - "Main Suraj Hu Tu Meri Kiran" with Mohammed Rafi
  - "Jal Jaoge Humne Jalava Dikhaya To" with Manna Dey
- Dilawar -
  - "Uthe Hai Haath Mere Ab To"
  - "Huzur Aap Ka Tha Intezaar"
  - "Janab-E-Ali Idhar Bhi"
  - "O Pardanasheen, Parde Ko Zara Chehre Se Hata Do" with Usha Mangeshkar
- Dillagi - "Ab Jeene Ka Mausam Aaya" with Mohammed Rafi
- Do Badan -
  - "Mat Jaiyo Naukariya Chhodke"
  - "Jab Chali Thandi Hawa"
- Do Dilon Ki Dastaan -
  - "Kahiye Janabe Ali Kaha Rahe"
  - "Yeh Machalta Samaa Aa Meri Jaane Jaan"
  - "Milati Hai Nazar Nazaron Se Agar" with Mohammed Rafi
  - "Mujhe Akhiyon Pe Apni Yakin Hai" with Mohammed Rafi
  - "Aji Pehle Mulakat Mein, Nahi Pyar Jataya Karte" with Mohammed Rafi
  - "Hum Toh Loot Gaye Pyaar Mein Haye Rama" with Mohammed Rafi
- Do Matwale -
  - "Hata De Jaam Nazar Se Nazar Mila"
  - "Aji O Suno To Mera Dil Gaya Re" with Mahendra Kapoor
- Duniya Hai Dilwalon Ki -
  - "Dil Liya Gham Diya Kya Kiya"
  - "Behki Behki Chaal Meri"
  - "Chinya Patakh Dham O Hum Mastana" with Mohammed Rafi
- Dus Lakh -
  - "Garibon Ki Suno, Woh Tumhara Sunega (duet)" with Mohammed Rafi
  - "Duniya Uski Sunti Hai" with Mohammed Rafi
  - "Teri Patli Kamar Teri Bali Umar" with Mohammed Rafi
  - "Garibo Ki Suno Wo Tumhaari Sunega (Female)"
  - "Agre Ka Lala Angreji Dulhan Laya Re" with Usha Mangeshkar
  - "Baje Mori Payal Chhanan Chhanan" with Usha Mangeshkar
- Hum Kahan Jaa Rahe Hain - "Rafta Rafta Woh Fil Ke Armaan Ho Rahe Hain" with Mahendra Kapoor
- Husn Aur Ishq -
  - "Dil Ki Fariyad Se Darr"
  - "Maza Barsaat Ka Chaho"
- Insaaf - "Yeh Tune Kya Kaha" with Mukesh
- Jadoo -
  - "Dhadkate Hue Do Dilon Ki Kahani"
- Jawan Mard -
  - "Tune Kyu Mere Dil Ka Chain"
  - "Sharab Shishe Ke Sagar Mein"
  - "Mubarak Ho Ki Hotho Pe"
  - "Maujon Mein Doob Gaya Sahil Hamara"
- Khoon Ka Khoon - "Leke Dil Mein Pyaar"
- Kunwari -
  - "Kahta Hai Mera Dil Ke Sanam" with Mukesh
  - "Jhan Jhan Baje Kaisi Madhur"
- Laadla -
  - "Aye Malik Dilwa De Ek Ladki" with Mohammed Rafi
  - "Paas Aakar Toh Na Yun Sharmaiye" with Mohammed Rafi
- Labela -
  - "Kabhi Taqdeer Ne Itna Hamein"
  - "Bhari Mehfil Mein Kya Aise"
  - "Li Angdayi Khankaye Kangna"
  - "Ek Zamana Tha Aisa" with C. Ramchandra
  - "O My Dear O My Sanam" with C. Ramchandra
  - "Aye Dil Ae Mere Dil" with C. Ramchandra
- Ladka Ladki -
  - "Kismat Jo Pilaye Humko"
  - "Aankhon Ko Meri Tum Apne" with Mahendra Kapoor
- Ladki Sahyadri Ki -
  - "Kahan Chale Chhaliya Mera Loot Ke Jiya"
  - "Kyun Lage Laaj Preet Ki"
  - "Meri Jhansi Nahi Doongi"
  - "Tum Mujhe Khoon Do"
  - "Karo Sab Nichhawar Bano Sab Fakir"
  - "Angrezo Ne Jeet Li Jhansi" with Mahendra Kapoor, and Amar Shaikh
- Lal Bungla - "Bahon mEin Aaja"
- Love and Murder -
  - "Ye Jiwan Jitni Baar Mile"
  - "Mere Dil Meri Ja Tu Kah De To"
  - "Jaan Aur Dil Dono Hai Haazir"
  - "Sajan Mere Dil Mein"
- Mamta - "In Paharon Mein Akele Na Phero" with Mohammed Rafi
- Mera Saaya -
  - "Naino Wali Ne, Haye Mera Dil Loota"
  - "Jhumka Gira Re"
- Mohabbat Zindagi Hai -
  - "Raaton Ko Chori Chori"
  - "Nazar Nazar Se Milao To"
  - "Tum Sabse Haseen Ho" with Mahendra Kapoor
  - "Mehfil Mein Dilwaalon Ki" with Mahendra Kapoor
- Nagin Aur Sapera -
  - "Na Badla Aakash Ka Chanda"
  - "Teri Been Hai Jadu Mera"
- Naujawan - "Koi Nazar Aashiqana Toh Dekhe" with Usha Mangeshkar
- Neend Humari Khwab Tumhare -
  - "Kabhi Tera Daman Na Chhodenge Hum" with Mohammed Rafi
  - "Husn Jab Jab Ishq Se Takra Gaya" with Mohammed Rafi
  - "Koi Shikwa Bhi Nahi"
  - "Bheegi Hui Is Raat Ka Aanchal"
  - "Sakiya Ek Jaam Woh Bhi To De" with Mubarak Begum
- Pati Patni -
  - "Maar Dalega Dard-e-Jigar"
  - "Kaise Dekha Hai Mujhe Ji" with Manna Dey
- Phool Aur Patthar -
  - "Laaya Hai Hazaron Rang Holi"
  - "Shishe Se Pi Yaa Paimaane Se Pi"
  - "Sun Le Pukar Aayi Aaj Tere Dwaar"
  - "Zindagi Mein Pyar Karna Seekh Le"
- Picnic -
  - "Mausam Lehra Gaya Nasha Sa Chha Gaya" with Mohammed Rafi
  - "Dil Mera Le Lo Ha Ha Bah?" with Mohammed Rafi
  - "Jab Mera Aanchal Dhalega" with Mohammed Rafi
  - "Anchal Ko Udne Do"
  - "He Nainva Na Pher Pher Ke" with Usha Mangeshkar
- Pinjre Ka Panchhi - "Jhoom Le Jhoom Le Ae Matwale Dil"
- Pyar Kiye Ja -
  - "Sun Le Pyar Ki Dushman Duniya" with Lata Mangeshkar, Kishore Kumar, and Manna Dey
- Pyar Mohabbat - "Aaj Aaye Ri Banke More Saiyan" with Usha Mangeshkar
- Saaz Aur Awaaz -
  - "Pyaar Ki Raah Bahar Ki Manzil" with Mohammed Rafi
  - "Tum Ishq Ki Mehfil Ho" with Mohammed Rafi
- Sagaai -
  - "Na Yeh Zameen Thi, Na Yeh Asmaan Tha" with Mohammed Rafi
  - "Khaak Mein Mila To Kya" with Usha Khanna, and Usha Mangeshkar
  - "Sajan Tori Preet Raat Bhar Ki"
- Sarhadi Lutera -
  - "Jannat Ki Hur Aapki Mehfil Mein" with Mohammed Rafi
  - "Allah Kasam Aaya" with Usha Mangeshkar
  - "Aisi Qatil Ada Aisa Zalim Shabab"
  - "Haale Dil Sunaane"
  - "Tum Mile Toh Zindagi Mili"
- Sawan Ki Ghata -
  - "Honthon Pe Hasi Sawan Ki Ghata" with Mohammed Rafi
  - "Khuda Huzur Ko Meri Bhi Zindagi De De" with Usha Mangeshkar
  - "Jo Dil Ki Tadap Na Jaane"
  - "Zara Haule Haule Chalo More Sajna"
  - "Meri Jaan Tum Pe Sadake (female)"
  - "Aaj Koi Pyar Se Dil Ki Baate Kah Gaya"
  - "Haule Haule Sajna, Dhire Dhire Balma"
- Shankar Khan -
  - "Dil Kho Gaya Hai Mera"
  - "Haseeno Nazneeno Naacho"
- Sher Afghan - "Yeh Jawani Ka Bichhua" with Minoo Purushottam
- Shera Daku -
  - "Dil De Ke Darde Mohabbat Liya Hai"
  - "Hans Ke Chala Teer Pe Teer"
  - "O Kanta Babulwa Ka Chubh"
- Smuggler - "Kaise Kaise Kaam Kiya" with Mahendra Kapoor
- Sunehre Kadam -
  - "Yeh Jawaani Badi Badnaam Hai" with Sudha Malhotra
  - "Nazuk Hoon Albeli Hoon"
  - "Yeh Jawaani Badi Badnaam Hai" with Sudha Malhotra
  - "Nazuk Hoon Albeli Hoon"
- Suraj -
  - "Kasie Samjhaaon Badi Nasaamjh Ho" with Mohammed Rafi
  - "Ek Baar Aati Hai Rut Aisi" with Mohammed Rafi
- Sushila -
  - "Satyamev Jayate" with Usha Mangeshkar
  - "Mere Aanchal Ka Diya"
- Tasveer -
  - "Main Teri DilTera Re Mitwa"
  - "Samjhoge Tum Kya Bhala"
  - "Mere Sulagte Huye Dil Ko"
- Teesri Kasam -
  - "Paan Khaye Saiyan Hamaro"
  - "Haye Gajab Kahin Taara Toota"
  - "Laali Laali Doliya Mein"
- Teesri Manzil -
  - "Dekhiye Saahibo Woh Koi Aaur Thi" with Mohammed Rafi
  - "Aaja Aaja Main Hoon Pyaar Tera" with Mohammed Rafi
  - "O Haseena Zulfonwali" with Mohammed Rafi
  - "O Mere Sona Re"
- Thakur Jernail Singh -
  - "Aayi Naino Me Kajra Daal Ke"
  - "Dil Mila Ke Milo Paas Aa Ke Milo"
  - "Hum Tere Bin Jee Nahin Sakenge"
- Veer Bajrang -
  - "Meri Aankhdiyon Mein Hai Jo Palak"
  - "Pinjare Ki Maina, Sun Meri Kehna"
- Yeh Raat Phir Na Aayegi -
  - "Aap Se Meri Jaan Maine Mohabbat Ki Hai" with Mohammed Rafi
  - "Phir Miloge Kabhi Is Baat Ka Vaada Karlo" with Mohammed Rafi
  - "Main Shaayad Tumhare Liye Ajnabi Hoon"
  - "Yehi Woh Jagaah Hai"
  - "Mohabbat Chiz Hai Kya"
  - "Har Tukda Mere Dil Ka Deta Hai Duhai"
  - "Huzurevaalaa Jo Ho Ijaazat To" with Minoo Purushottam
- Yeh Zindagi Kitni Haseen Hai -
  - "Jeene Ka Agar Andaz Aaye"
  - "Mashalla Tum Jawa Ho (Female)"
  - "Koi Aankh Mila Ke Dekhe"
  - "Dekho Yeh Diwana"
- Zimbo Ka Beta -
  - "Meri Jaan Yunhi Raho" with Usha Mangeshkar
  - "Gungun Gaoon, Hawaon Mein Lehraoon"
  - "Meri Ankhen Hai Nashili"
  - "Dil Jiske Liye Betaab Raha"

=== 1967 ===
- Aag -
  - "Teri Reshmi Zulfen Chhu Kar Jab" with Mahendra Kapoor
  - "Ek Bijli Se Meri Ankh Lad Gayi" with Mahendra Kapoor
  - "Ghunghat Na Kholungi"
- Aayega Aanewala -
  - "Koi Aayega Aag Se Aag Bujhane"
  - "Mere Anchal Se Khele Hawa"
  - "Le Le Haath Se Chala Bada Chulbula Hai Dil"
- An Evening in Paris -
  - "Zuby Zuby Zalembu"
  - "Raat Ke Humsafar" with Mohammed Rafi
- Arabian Nights -
  - "Ya Jale Mehfil Aarzu Hai Bas Ek Jaam Ki"
  - "Husn Ke Jalwe Hai Jawaan"
  - "Dekho Ji Dil Gaya Dil Gaya"
- Aurat -
  - "Shola Ulfat Ka Bhadkake" with Mohammed Rafi
  - "Yeh Kaun Hai, Jiske Aane Se Suraj Ki Kiran Sharmaye" with Mahendra Kapoor
  - "Hamen Tumse Mohabbat"
- Awara Ladki -
  - "Aare Jaanewale Nazar Toh Mila Jaa"
  - "Tum Chale Tum Chale"
- Badrinath Yatra - "Yeh Zindagi Hai Chaar Din Ki"
- Baharon Ke Sapne -
  - "Do Pal Jo Teri Aankhon Se" with Usha Mangeshkar
- Bahu Begum -
  - "Nikle The Kahan Jaane Ke Liye"
  - "Sirf Apne Khayalon Ki Parchhayi Hai"
  - "Padh Gaye Jhoole, Sawan Rut Aayi Re" with Lata Mangeshkar
  - "Hum Intezar Karenge (duet)" with Mohammed Rafi
- Bhakta Prahlad - "O Ro Chatpat Chatpat Chhori" with Mohammed Rafi
- Boond Jo Ban Gayee Moti[39] -
  - "Meri Zindagi Ek Khwab Hai"
  - "Lovely Lovely Hai Sama" with Mahendra Kapoor
  - "Boond Jo Ban Gayee Moti" with Manna Dey
- C.I.D. 909 -
  - "Dhadka To Hoga Dil Zarur" with Mahendra Kapoor, and Kamal Barot
  - "Tera Nikhra Nikhra Chehra" with Mahendra Kapoor, and Kamal Barot
  - "Yaar Badmash Hai Dilruba"
  - "Aadi Ka Kinara Ho Pani Aawara Ho"
  - "Chaho To Jan Le Lo Malik"
  - "Jaane Tamanna Kya Kar Dala" with Mahendra Kapoor
- Chandan Ka Palna -
  - "Mastana Hoye Parwana Hoye" with Manna Dey
  - "Baat Karte Ho" with Manna Dey
  - "Zulfon Ko Aap Yun Na Sawaara Karo" with Mohammad Rafi
- Chhaila Babu - "Tum Sanwarte Jo Toh Hu. Darte Hain" with C. Ramchandra
- Chhoti Si Mulaqat -
  - "Mta Jaa Mat Jaa, Mere Bachpan Nadaan"
  - "Chhoti Si Mulaqaat Pyaar Ban Gayi" with Mohammed Rafi
- Dil Ne Pukara - "Kis Qadar Zaalim Ho Qatil" with Manna Dey
- Dilruba -
  - "Main Kaise Qadam Apne Peechhe Hata Lpon"
  - "Jaane Jigar Na Dekh Idhar"
  - "Haye Allah Kyun Humne Pyaar Kiya Tha Tumse" with Usha Mangeshkar
- Do Dushman -
  - "Vai Vai Loshe Loshe O Dilbar Ishq Kurbana" with Mohammed Rafi
  - "Aan Hi Kaha Ban Than Ke Chali" with Kamal Barot, Mahendra Kapoor, and Bhupinder Singh
  - "Chammak Challo Jiyo Walla" with Kamal Barot
  - "O Yara Yaar Mile To" with Minoo Purushottam
  - "Ya Kurban Ae Husn Tera Jana" with Manna Dey
- Dulhan Ek Raat Ki - "Hamar Kaha Maano Raja Ji" with Usha Mangeshkar
- Duniya Nachegi -
  - "Raat Ko Bagh Mein Mere Dilbar"
  - "Anjam-E-Mohabbat Hum Kya Jane" with Usha Mangeshkar
  - "Ki Jo Mai Hota Hawa Ka Jhonka" with Manna Dey
- Farz - "Aaja Aaja Mere Paas"
- Ghar Ka Chirag -
  - "Jaane Kaise Chori Chori Balama Ne Dekha"
  - "Ae Mahalon Mein Rahnewlo"
  - "Jaane Mera Chanda Khoya Hai Kahan"
- Gunehgar -
  - "Sham Dhali Shama Jali"
  - "Bajariya Mein Kaise Najariya"
  - "Husn Hai Dil"
- Hamare Gam Se Mat Khelo - "Shaukh-e-Bepaayan Ka Izhaar Karun Ya Na Karun"
- Hamraaz -
  - "Tu Husn Hai, Main Ishq Hoon" with Mahendra Kapoor
- Hare Kanch Ki Chooriyan -
  - "Dhani Chunri Pahan Sajke Banke Dulhan"
  - "Panchchi Re O Panchchi Panchchi Re O Panchchi" with Mohammad Rafi
- Hum Do Daku - "Ae Haseeno Nazneeno" with Kishore Kumar, and Usha Mangeshkar
- Jaal -
  - "Dil De De" with Mohammed Rafi
- Jewel Thief -
  - "Baithe Hai Kya Uske Paas"
  - "Raat Akeli Hai"
- Laat Saab[41] -
  - "Tan Mein Agni Man Men Chubhan" with Mohammed Rafi
  - "Ai Chand Jara Chhup Ja" with Mohammed Rafi
- Lamboo In Hong Kong -
  - "Mere Dil Ka Dil Meri Jaan Ki Jaan" with Mohammed Rafi
  - "Ye Hai Hongkong"
  - "Tera Jalwa Subhan Allah"
  - "Tere Bin Sajna"
- Lav Kush - "Sarayu Ke Nire Teere Avadh Nagariya" with Usha Mangeshkar
- Maikhana -
  - "Yeh Tamanna Hi Rahi Unka Payaam Aayega"
  - "Uyi Allah Re Di Naina" with Usha Mangeshkar
- Mehrban - "Saawan Ki Raat Kaari Kaari"
- Mere Bhai Mere Dushman -
  - "Ada Jadoo Haseen Qatil"
  - "Hum Toh Dekhte Chale Gaye"
  - "Raat Ka Anchal"
- Mere Munna -
  - "Aengan Baingan Tali Talaingan"
  - "Khushiyon Ke Deep Jalao" with Usha Timothy
- Milan Ki Raat -
  - "Babu Re Babu Is Zamane"
  - "Doom Tara Ek Doom Tara"
- Nai Roshni - "Yeh Tohfa Tumhare Pyaar Ka"
- Nasihat -
  - "Teri Ankho Ne In Ankhon Se Jo Baat Kahi" with Mahendra Kapoor, and Kamal Barot
  - "Kabhi Humari Mohabbat Ka Imthan Na Lo"
  - "Mujhko Diwana Na Kar Aa Mere Karib Aa"
  - "Aankhon Se Ishaara Karke Humein"
- Naunihal - "Gore Galon Ki Bhi Le Lo" with Usha Mangeshkar
- Nawab Sirazuddaula -
  - "Bin Bulaye Tere Mehfil Mein"
  - "Sakiya Sakiya Aankh Se Jaam Pila De"
  - "Mujhse Bichhade Tere Deewane"
  - "Mohabbat Se Roshan Hai"
- Noor Jehan -
  - "Aap Jab Se Karib Aaye Hain" with Mohammed Rafi
  - "Aa Gaya Lab Pe Afsana" with Usha Mangeshkar
  - "Mohabbat Ho Gayi Mere Meherbaan Ko"
  - "Kasam Hai Tujhe Mere In Ansuon Ki"
- Palki - "Main Idhar Jaoon Ya Udhar Jaoon" with Manna Dey, and Mohammed Rafi
- Patthar Ke Sanam -
  - "Yeh Bahar Yeh Sama"
- Poonam Ka Chand -
  - "Ek Suhagan Bani"
  - "O Chhori Gori"
- Raat Andheri Thi -
  - "Zindagi Pyasi Hai Pyas Bujha De" with Sharda
  - "Moshi Moshi Kaise Ho Ji"
  - "I Love You, You Love Me"
  - "Jaan E Chaman Aaja O Gul Badan Aaja" with Mohammed Rafi
- Rajoo -
  - "Mere Munne Re, Seedhi Raah Pe Chalna"
  - "Chahe Dekh Ghoor Ke, Chahe Deve Galiyan" with Mohammed Rafi
- Ram Aur Shyam -
  - "O Balam Tere Pyaar Ki Thandi Aag Mein" with Mohammed Rafi
  - "Aaj Sakhi Ri More Piya Ghar Aaye Re"
  - "Dhire Dhire Bol Koi Sun Lega" with Mahendra Kapoor
- Ram Rajya - "Dharti Pawan Purti Ki Hai Hum" with Usha Timothy
- Sangdil -
  - "Aaja Re Sard Rat Ye Sard Hawa"
  - "Mera Dil Dil Dil Meri Jaan Jaan Jaan"
  - "Na Hosh Mein Saaki Hai"
- Sardar - "Kabhi Deewana Dil"
- Shamsheer -
  - "Baar Baar Dhadke Jiya" with Kamal Barot
  - "Rangile Piya Ho Pukare Jiya Ho" with Kamal Barot
  - "Tirchhi Nazaro Ka Waar" with Usha Mangeshkar
  - "Ud Ud More Sar Se Dupatta" with Usha Mangeshkar
- Sub Ka Ustad -
  - "Raja Aana Humare Bangle Pe" with Kamal Barot
  - "Maine Kaha Jaaneman Meharbaan"
  - "Balkhaye Qamariya Humar Sanware"
  - "Mohabbat Bikti Hai Dil Bikta"
  - "Meri Dulhan Aayi Sang Doli Na Qahar" with Mohammed Rafi
- Trip To Moon - "Dekha Janaab Ko, Ab Dil Par Khair Ho"
- Upkar -
  - "Gulabi Raat Gulabi"
- Wahan Ke Log -
  - "Zindagi Ka Nasha Halka Halka Surur"
  - "Jab Tumko Pukaaru Mai Sarkaar Chale Aana"
- Woh Koi Aur Hoga -
  - "Wo Koi Aur Hoga"
  - "Ae Raat Ke Andhere Mujhko Gale Laga Le (Version 1)"
  - "Ae Raat Ke Andhere Mujhko Gale Laga Le (Version 2)"

=== 1968 ===
- Aabroo -
  - "Aapse Pyaar Hua, Aap Khafa Ho Baithe"
  - "Holi Aai Re" with Manna Dey
- Aashirwad - "Saf Karo, Insaaf Karo" with Manna Dey, and Ashok Kumar
- Abhilasha -
  - "Munna Mere Aa, Sadke Tere Aa"
- Anjam -
  - "Main Jo Gale Lag Jaoongi"
  - "Tujhko Sanam Kyun Maana"
- Ankhen -
  - "Loot Jaa, Yehi Din Hai" with Kamal Barot, and Usha Mangeshkar
  - "Tujhko Rakhe Ram, Tujhko Allah Rakhe" with Manna Dey
- Anokhi Raat - "Meri Beri Ke Ber Mat Todo"
- Apna Ghar Apni Kahani -
  - "Peena Haraam Hai Na Pilana Haraam Hai"
  - "Chand Bhi Koi Deewana Hai" with Mahendra Kapoor
- Aulad - "Jodi Hamara Jamega Kaise Jani" with Manna Dey
- Baazi -
  - "Main Haseena Nazneena" with Lata Mangeshkar
- Balram Shri Krishna -
  - "Koyi Bata Do Pata Piya Ka"
  - "Mujhko Auro Se Kya "
  - "Are Kar Lo Balma Pyaar" with Kamal Barot
  - "Bada Hai Banka Mera Devariya" with Kamal Barot
- Bambai Raat Ke Baahon Mein - "Bombai Raat Ki Baahon Mein"
- Dil Aur Mohabbat -
  - "Hath Aaya Hai Jab Se Tera Hath Mein" with Mahendra Kapoor
  - "Kitaabi Chehra Gulaabi Aankhen" with Mahendra Kapoor
  - "Uff Ye Bekarar Dil"
  - "My Name Is Kishori"
  - "Bade Khubsurat Bade Hi Hasin"
- Do Kaliyaan -
  - "Chitnandan Aake Naachungi"
  - "Sajna O Sajna, Aise Mein Ji Na Jala"
- Duniya -
  - "Dooriyan Nazdikiyan Ban Gayi" with Kishore Kumar
  - "Yeh Dharti Hindustan Ki"
- Ek Phool Ek Bhool -
  - "Kahan Leke Dil Chale Mere Saiya Manchale"
  - "Pee Ke Aur Pyas Badhi"
- Ek Raat -
  - "Mere Gesuon Se Chankar"
  - "Aaj Ki Hasin Raat Hans Ke Guzar" with Usha Khanna
- Farishta -
  - "Ek Khoobsurat Ladki, Mere Nahin" with Kishore Kumar
  - "Sabse Pyara Bhai Bahan Ka Pyar Hain"
  - "Ruth Badli More Rasiya Mile"
  - "Duniya Ek Jhamela Hai"
- Gauri -
  - "Pehle Wafaa Ka Apni Yaqeen Toh Dilaaye"
  - "Baaj Ri Mori Paayaliya"
- Golden Eyes: Secret Agent 007 -
  - "Idjar Toh Dekho, Ek Nazar Toh Dekho"
  - "Par Ghata Chhayi"
  - "Tera Husn Ka Yeh Nazaara" with Mahendra Kapoor
  - "Yeh Aankhen Teri Hai Kaatil" with Mahendra Kapoor
  - "Ulfat Oi Nishaani Deke Chale Woh Chhalla" with Kamal Barot
- Har Har Gange -
  - "Arre Maar Dala"
  - "O Rajaji Dekho" with Usha Timothy
- Haseena Maan Jayegi - "Mere Mehboob Mujhko Itna Bata" with Manna Dey
- Hum Sab Ek Hain -
  - "Bharat Desh Mahaan"
- Humsaya -
  - "Mujhe Mera Pyar De De" with Mohammed Rafi
  - "Woh Haseen Dard De Do"
  - "Aaja Mere Pyar Ke Sahare"
  - "O Kanhaiya Kanhaiya"
  - "Kitna Haseen Hai Yeh Jahan"
  - "Badi Mushkil Se Kaabu Mein" with Mahendra Kapoor
- Izzat - "Sar Le Lamba Top Leke" with Mohammed Rafi
- Jahan Mile Dharti Aakash -
  - "Ab Kitne Baaje Hain" with Mohammed Rafi
- Jhuk Gaya Aasman - "Kisi Ki Jaan Lete Hain"
- Jung Aur Mohabbat -
  - "Nigahon Mein Mohabbat Ka"
- Kaafir - "Apna Dil Pesh Karoon"
- Kahin Aur Chal -
  - "Shokh Aanjhen Dekh Kar" with Mohammed Rafi
- Kahin Din Kahin Raat -
  - "Mohabbat Ho Gayi Jinse"
  - "Hum Pe Yeh Ilzam Kyun Hain"
  - "Tumhara Chahnewala Khuda Ki Duniya Mein" with Mahendra Kapoor
  - "Jab Aa Hi Gaye Hain" with Shankar Dasgupta, Badrinath Pawar, and Mahendra Kapoor
- Kanyadaan - "Sunday Ko Pyaar Hua, Monday Ko Iqraar Hia" with Mahendra Kapoor
- Khiladi -
  - "Pyaar Koo Kam Kam Kare" with Mohammed Rafi
  - "Sun Zara Jane Jaha"
  - "Aaj Dil Ka Khiladi Kya Aaya"
  - "Pichhe Pichhe Aaye Mere"
- Kismat -
  - "Kajra Mohabbatwala" with Shamshad Begum
  - "Kajra Mohabbatwala (revival)" with Shamshad Begum
  - "One Two Three Baby" with Mahendra Kapoor
  - "Aao Huzoor Tumko"
  - "Aao Huzoor Tumko (revival)"
- Man Ka Meet -
  - "Kali Kali Raat Daraye"
  - "Ek Anari Jangali Janwar Badtamij Diwana"
  - "Apni Aankhon Ke Jarokhon Mein Bitha Lo Mujko" with Mahendra Kapoor
  - "Fere Jaise Toh Aata Hai" with Raj Grover
- Mera Naam Johar - "Saare Chirag Ko Gul Kar Do"
- Mere Huzoor -
  - "Mere Jaan Apne Aashiq Ko Sataana" with Mohammed Rafi
- Nadir Shah -
  - "Sakhiya Bahaar Aaye Jhoom Jhoom"
  - "Phulo Tale Ham Tum Se Mile"
- Neel Kamal -
  - "Vo Zindagi Jo Thi Ab Tak"
  - "Hey Rom Rom Me Basne Waale Raam"
  - "Dono Ke Vich Kar Lagta"
- Not Abailable - "Kahin Pe Ek Shama Thi" with Mohammed Rafi
- Padosan

| "Main Chali, Main Chali" -

  - "Main Chali, Main Chali" with Lata Mangeshkar
- Parivar - "Andaz Toh Pyaar Jataane Ka" with Mahendra Kapoor
- Pativrata -
  - "Madhur Mann Geet Gaa"
  - "O Re Vidhaata"
  - "Soye Ho Kyun Deva"
  - "Sajke Aaye Hain Dekho"
- Payal Ki Jhankar - "Aye Mere Soye Huye Pyaar (female)"
- Pyaar Bana Afsana -
  - "Pyaar Deewana Bane Kyun" with Mohammed Rafi
  - "Kaho Jo Tumhen Kisise Pyaar Hai" with Mohammed Rafi
  - "Mere Jahaan Mein Tum Pyaar Leke Aaye"
- Raja Aur Runk - "Mere Raja Mere Lal" with Usha Mangeshkar
- Ramdoot Hanuman -
  - "Aayo Re Aayo Re Laal Mere" with Manna Dey
  - "Haye Jhananan Jhananan Baaje" with Usha Mangeshkar
- Roop Rupaiya - "Dekhi Zamane Ki Humne Ye Reet" with Mohammed Rafi
- Sadhu Aur Shaitaan -
  - "Nandlal Gopal Daya Karke" with Usha Mangeshkar
  - "A For Apple, B For Baby" with Manna Dey
- Shikar -
  - "Jabse Lagi Tose Najariya" with Lata Mangeshkar
  - "Main Albeli Pyar Jatakar"
  - "Hay Mere Paas To Aa"
  - "Parde Mein Rahne Do"
- Shrimanji -
  - "Pahalu Men Yaar Ho To" with Kishore Kumar
  - "Gori Sharmao Na" with Kamal Barot
  - "Jhoote Balam Ka Babuji Pyar Jhoota" with Kamal Barot
- Spy In Rome -
  - "Chalo Chaman Mein Jaye"
  - "Chalka Chalka Paimana Pee Le"
  - "Mujhe Pyar Kiya Bekarar Kiya"
- Suhaag Raat - "Main Qayamat Hoon" with Lata Mangeshkar
- Sunghursh -
  - "Tasveer-e-Mohabbat"
- Teen Bahuraniyan -
  - "Humre Angan Bagiya, Bagiya Mein Do Panchhi" with Lata Mangeshkar, and Usha Mangeshkar
  - "Aamdani Athanni, Kharcha Rupaiya, Bhaiya Na Poochho" with Mahendra Kapoor, and Kamal Barot
  - "Aa Sapnon Ki Rani, Aa Sapnon Ke Raja" with Kishore Kumar,
  - "Meri Taraf Zara Dekh"
  - "Dilli Ke Bazaar Mein"
- Teri Talash Mein -
  - "Kho Diye Hain Sanam Teri Talaash Mein"
  - "Raaz-e-Dil Hum Se Kaho"
  - "Mera Dil Behka Behka Sa Hai"
  - "Koi Diwana Tumhe Chahega" with Mohammed Rafi
  - "Kisne Kaha Aapse" with Usha Mangeshkar
- Thief of Baghdad - "Kisi Ka Agar Tumko Dil Lootna" with Usha Mangeshkar
- Vaasna -
  - "Mulk Mein Bachchon Ki Gar Sarkar Ho" with Lata Mangeshkar
- Watan Se Door -
  - "Pyare Pyare Tere Andaz Ke Qurban" with Mohammed Rafi
  - "Kaisa Jadu Dala" with Mohammed Rafi
  - "Main Toh Naachun, Main Toh Gaaun" with Kamal Barot

=== 1969 ===
- Aadmi Aur Insaan -
  - "Zindagi Ittefaq Hai" with Mahendra Kapoor
  - "Ijazat Hai" with Mahendra Kapoor
  - "O Neele Parbaton Ki Dhaara" with Mahendra Kapoor
  - "Zindagi Ke Rang Kai Re Saathi Re"
  - "Zindagi Ittefaq Hai"
  - "Itni Jaldi Na Karo"
- Aansoo Ban Gaye Phool -
  - "Jane Kaisa Hai, Mera Deewana" with Kishore Kumar
  - "Meharban Mehboob Dilbar"
  - "Ho O, Suno To Jani"
- Anjaan Hai Koi - "Doobe Hai Gilason Mein"
- Anmol Moti -
  - "Aaja Raja Leke Baaraat"
  - "Main Kya Se Ho Gayi"
  - "Koi Mera Bachpan"
- Apna Khoon Apna Dushman -
  - "Tumhari Chand Si Surat Pe Hamko Pyar" with Mohammed Rafi
  - "Chhapan Chhuri Hai Mera Naam" with Usha Timothy
  - "Zara Nazre Mila"
  - "Khata Maaf Karna Humari Khudaya"
- Aradhana - "Gunguna Rahe Hain Bhawre" with Mohammed Rafi
- Aya Sawan Jhoom Ke -
  - "Main Ik Haseena"
- Bandhan - "Are Jaana Hai Toh Jaao" with Mahendra Kapoor
- Aradhana -
  - "Gunguba Rahe Hain Bhanwre" with Mohammed Rafi
- Badi Didi -
  - "Sajna Maine Kal Dekha Ek Sapna"
  - "Is Desh Ko Swaarg Banana Hai"
- Balak - "Chandaniya Chandaniya Haay Raat Sajan Rahiyo Ki Jaiyo"
- Bandish -
  - "Ajab Hai Ye Duniyaa Ajab Zindgi Hai"
  - "Aaja Tu Idhar Aa Aa Tu Idhar Aa"
  - "Teri Aayi Hai Barat"
- Bank Robbery -
  - "Haye Maar Dala Pehli Mulaqat Mein" with Usha Mangeshkar
  - "Garibon Ka Jeena Nahi Koi Jeena"
  - "Uff Ye Nazar Mohabbat Ki"
- Beqasoor -
  - "Rukhsana Rukhsana Dekho Ji Rukhsana" with Mohammed Rafi
  - "Mohabbat Se Keh Do"
  - "Naam Gulabi Hain Mera"
- Beti -
  - "Ek Meethi Nazar Phool Barsa Gayi" with Mohammed Rafi
  - "Lehenga Maangwa De Mere Babu" with Usha Mangeshkar
- Bhai Bahen -
  - "Chori Chori Aa Ja, Tu Meri Gali Aa Ja"
  - "Dastur Zamane Ka Ye Badla Nahi"
  - "Dheere Dheere Mohabbat Jawaan Ho Gayi" with Mohammed Rafi
  - "Chand Nikla Bhi Nahi Aur Chandni Hai Saamne" with Mohammed Rafi
- Chalbaaz -
  - "Tum Apne Mohabbat Ka Asar Dikhate Jaao"
  - "Tere Bina Kal Aaye Na Sajna"
  - "Sooni Sooni Lag Rahi Hai Chandni Tere Bagair" with Mohammed Rafi
  - "Shukriya Aap Ko Inayat Ka" with Mohammed Rafi
- Chanda Aur Bijli -
  - "Dekh Tamasha Dekh Jamure"
  - "Aaj Koi Aayega Dil Se Lagayega"
  - "Bijli Hu Main Toh"
- Do Bhai -
  - "Geet Nahin Ban Sakte" with Mohammed Rafi
  - "Main Sunati Hoon"
- Doli -
  - "Pehle Jhuk Kar Karo Salaam" with Mohammed Rafi
  - "Aaj Main Dekhun Jidhar Jidhar" with Mohammed Rafi
  - "Sajna Sath Nibhana" with Mohammed Rafi
  - "Aaj Pila De Saaqi Apni" with Mahendra Kapoor
- Duniya -
  - "Dooriyan Nazdeekiyan Ban Gayi" with Kishore Kumar
  - "Tu Kahe Maharashtra Mera"
- Ek Masoom -
  - "Poochh Le Dil Se Mere" with Mohammed Rafi
  - "Jo Na Poore Huye"
  - "Mohtaram Chhodiye Sa Re Ga Ma"
  - "Tu Hi Meri Zindagi Tu Hi Arman"
- Ek Phool Do Mali -
  - "Kar De Madad Garib Ki" with Mohammed Rafi
  - "Chal Chal Re Naujawan" with Mohammed Rafi
  - "Yeh Parda Hataa Do"
  - "Sajna Sajna, O Sajna"
  - "Saiyan Le Gayi Jiya"
- Ek Shriman Ek Shrimati -
  - "Pyar To Ek Din Hona Tha, Ho Gaya, Ho Gaya" with Mohammed Rafi
  - "Raja Tohe Nainon Se Madira"
  - "Hello Hello Everybody"
- Ek Tha Chander Ek Thi Sudha - "Lambi Lambi Kaali Kaali Zulfen Bikjraaye"
- Gunda -
  - "Nam Saqi Rahe Baki"
  - "Khushi Se Jan Le Lo Ji"
- Gustakhi Maaf -
  - "Ae Jaanejaan Chali Kahana" with Mohammed Rafi
  - "Tum Door Jaaoge Kaise"
  - "Sajna Meraa Jiyara Jale"
- Haseena Man Jayegi - "Mere Mehboob Mujhko Tu Itna Bata" with Manna Dey
- Hum Ek Hain -
  - "Ek Bijli Se Meri Aankh Lad Gayi" with Mahendra Kapoor
  - "Hum Punjabi Hain, Hum Bengali" with Mohammed Rafi, and Manna Dey
- Insaaf Ka Mandir -
  - "Sun Pyare Sajna Re Mann Gaye Geet Suhane" with Mukesh
  - "Aap Hi Ki Qasam" with Usha Mangeshkar
  - "Pyaare Aaja Chori Chori"
  - "'Nindiya Kho Kar Nain Hanse"
- Jaalsaaz -
  - "Teri Nazar Ne Kiya Kya Ishara" with Mohammed Rafi
  - "Dil To Hamar Lai Lai"
  - "Kal Maine Ek Sapna Dekha"
- Jeene Ki Raah - "Chanda Ko Dhoondhne Sabhi Taare Nikal Pade" with Mohammed Rafi, Usha Mangeshkar, and Hemlata
- Jigri Dost -
  - "Chanda Ko Dhoondhne Sabhi Taare Nikal Pade"
- Jiyo Aur Jeene Do - "Rut Albeli Dagariya Naveli"
- Madhavi -
  - "Parda Hata De Mukhda Dikha De" with Mohammed Rafi
  - "Tum Mere Sapno Mein Aana" with Mohammed Rafi
  - "Nandkishor Nand Gopal Jhule" with Lata Mangeshkar
- Mahal -
  - "Chhedo Na, Dekho Na, Main Sharma Jaaungi" with Dev Anand
  - "Ankhon Ankhon Mein Hum Tum" with Kishore Kumar
  - "Yeh Duniyawale Poochhenge" with Kishore Kumar
- Mahua -
  - "Sajan Tere Pyaar Men Main To Hui Barabaad" with Omi
  - "Main Hoon Tera Geet Gori" with Mohammed Rafi
  - "Chham Chham Chhani Chhamak Chhana"
  - "Pyar Mera Jo Tune Loota"
  - "Mohe Bikata Sajan Mil Jaye To Le Lu" with Usha Timothy
- Mera Dost -
  - "Hume Aap Apna Bana Lijiye"
  - "Mohabbat Se Zyada"
- Mr. Murder -
  - "Sakhi Ri Mujhe Duniya Se" with Usha Mangeshkar
  - "Hum Toh Dil Jaan Dono Hi Kho Baithe"
  - "Thandi Hawayen Behki Adayen"
  - "Roop Nagar Ki Phoolwari Main"
- Mujhe Seene Se Laga Lo -
  - "Makhmur Nigaho Me Teri"
  - "Mujhe Sine Se Laga Lo"
  - "Mere Sovat Nand Kishor"
  - "Ek Jhalak Dikhlane Maa Ko" with Mahendra Kapoor
- Nai Zindagi -
  - "Dheere Dheere Chalna" with Manna Dey
  - "Laga Sidha Kaleje Pe" with Usha Mangeshkar
- Nanha Farishta - "O Re O Sharabi, Tujh Mein Ek Kharabi"
- Paisa Ya Pyar -
  - "Mujhe Chhu Nahi Waise Hi Mil Le" with Mohammed Rafi
  - "Ber Le Lo Ber Meva Garibon Ka"
  - "Jane Kyon Bar Bar Mera Dil Mujhe Kahe Usse Mil"
  - "Tu Bhi Number Ek Hai Pyare" with Kishore Kumar
- Prarthana -
  - "O Bawari Jayegi Tu Kaise Piya Dware"
  - "O Rasiya More Piya"
- Prince - "Muqabla Humse Na Karo" with Lata Mangeshkar, and Mohammed Rafi
- Pyar Ka Sapna -
  - "Night Is Lovely, Dark and Cool"
- Pyar Hi Pyar -
  - " Mera Mai Teri Duniya Jale To Jale" with Mohammed Rafi
  - "O Sakhiya O Sakhiya Mori Ankhiya Lad Gayi"
- Pyasi Shaam - "Saiyan Bijli Hai Mere Badan Mein"
- Raat Ke Andhere Main -
  - "Raat Ke Andhere Mein, Baahon Ke Ghere Mein"
- Rahgir -
  - "Babu Ghabrate Hai" with Kishore Kumar
  - "Daiya Kasam Sharam Sharam Laage" with Usha Mangeshkar
- Road To Sikkim -
  - "Aji Ye Dil Dhadka"
  - "Hum Hasin Tum Jawaan"
- Sachaai -
  - "More Saiyan Pakde Baiyan"
  - "Beet Chali Hai Ram"
  - "Kab Se Dhari Hai Saamne Botal" with Mohammed Rafi
  - "Sau Baras Ki Zindagi Se Achchha Hai" with Mohammed Rafi
- Samay Bada Balwan -
  - "Teri Tasveer Se Ankhen Meri" with Mohammed Rafi
  - "Ruth Kar Tum Bhala Yun Kaha"
  - "Yun Na Dekho Humein"
- Sambandh -
  - "Hey Jagat Pita Parmatma Karo Nirmal Meri Aatma" with Hemant Kumar
  - "Apni Maa Ki Kismat Par"
  - "Hoon Main Piya Aa"
  - "Tumko Toh Karodo Saal Huye"
  - "Main Ankhon Mein Milan Ki"
- Shart -
  - "Koi Is Baat Ko Jaan Le"
  - "Chori Se Saiyan Ne Mohe Pukaara Re"
- Shatranj -
  - "Na Socha Na Samjha, Na Seekha, Na Jaana"
  - "Tadap Jiski Hai Tumko" with Mohammed Rafi
- Soldier -
  - "Baazar Sara Lut Liya"
  - "Tum Ek Nazar Dekho To Idhar"
  - "Zameen Ke Chand Tere Dil"
- Tamanna - "O Soniya Matwaliya, Main Jaan Gayi Dilwaliya" with Mohammed Rafi
- The Killers -
  - "Mere Dil Zindagi Safar Hai" with Usha Khanna
  - "Churate Ho Nazrein Aji Kis Liye"
  - "Nazre Mila Ke Aapne Ahsan Kar Diye"
  - "Dil Janab Ke Kadmon Mein"
  - "Yeh Jo Dil Mangte Hai" with Kamal Barot
  - "Sabse Aala Meri Jaan" with Mahendra Kapoor
- Toofan -
  - "Mera Naam Shola, Na Ban Itna Bhola" with Usha Mangeshkar
  - "Laga Mohe Ab Ki Baar"
  - "Husn Mein Bhi Hai Nasha"
  - "Humne Toh Pyaar Kiya, Pyaar Pyaar (version 1)" with Mukesh
  - "Humne Toh Pyaar Kiya, Pyaar Pyaar (version 2)" with Mukesh
- Ustad 420 - "Kare Woh Kya, Jisko Pyaar Ho Gaya"
- Vishwas -
  - "Muskurake Humko Loota Aapne" with Mukesh
- Waris -
  - "Chahe Koi Mujhe Bhoot Kaho" with Mohammed Rafi
  - "Kaun Hai Woh Kaun Mujhe Jisne Jagaya" with Manna Dey
- Yakeen -
  - "Bach Bachke Bachke Kahan Jaaoge"

== 1970s ==
=== 1970 ===
- Aag Aur Daag -
  - "Humse Badhkar Kaun Hoga Aapka Deewana" with Mohammed Rafi
  - "Choli Bheegi Lat Bheegi"
  - "Kam Nahin Sharab Se"
- Aan Milo Sajna - "Palat Meri Jaan, Teri Qurbaan"
- Abhinetri -
  - "Bane Bade Raja"
- Begunah -
  - "Antul Mehbubi Antul Mehbubi" with Mohammed Rafi
  - "Aaj Maine Pee Hai"
  - "Andhera Ujale Se Takda Raha Hai"
- Bhagwan Parshuram -
  - "Mere Man Ke Manasarovar Mein"
  - "Jane Wale Piyaa Tune Ye Kya Kiya"
- Bhai Bhai - "Aaj Raat Hai Jawaan, Dil Mera Todiye"
- Choron Ka Chor -
  - "O Mere Dildaar" with Mohammed Rafi
  - "Tera Mera Pyaar"
- Darpan - "Jal Gayi Jal Gayi" with Kishore Kumar
- Devi -
  - "Ek Hain Sab Hindustani"
- Dharti - "Shu Shu, Dheere Dheere Bolo Ji"
- Ehsan -
  - "Aaja Tujhe Pyaar Kar Loon O Jaan-E-Jaana" with Kishore Kumar
  - "Aaj Tere Naina Milke Jhuke Kyu Kai Baar" with Mohammed Rafi
  - "Yeh Jhalak Yeh Jhalak"
  - "Aayi Hu Main Dil Ke Taron Mein"
- Ek Nanhi Munni Ladki Thi -
  - "Kahan Gaya Mera Sanam"
  - "Yeh Jalte Hue Lab"
- Ganwaar -
  - "Humse To Achhi Teri Payal Gori" with Mohammed Rafi
  - "Tera Chikna Roop Hai Aisa" with Mohammed Rafi
- Geet -
  - "Tujhe Majnu Ki Kasam" with Mohammed Rafi
  - "Jo Dil Me Basai Thi Tasveer"
- Gunah Aur Kanoon -
  - "Ab To Jane Do Saiya Mulaqat Ho Gayi"
  - "Ek Ek Pal Ro Ro Beete"
  - "Kisne Mujhe Chauka Diya"
- Gunahon Ke Raste -
  - "Ae Sanam Tunse Kuchh Kehna Hai Akele Mein"
  - "Meri Bhi Yeh Zid Hau Saiyan Ko Tadpaoongi"
  - "Chori Chori Jaise Mori Bindiya Bhi Haari" with Usha Timothy
- Hamara Adhikar -
  - "Ae Sanam Kuch Kahnaa Hai Tumse"
  - "Meri Bhi Ye Zid Hai Meri Bhi Ye Zid "
  - "Chori Chori Jaise Mori Bindiya" with Usha Mangeshkar
- Harishchandra Taramati - "Hum Jiye Ya Mare" with Usha Mangeshkar
- Haveli -
  - "Gesuon Ki Hasin Chhaon Mein"
  - "Na Hum Gair Hai Na Tum Ajnabi"
  - "O Nirmohi Suni Suni Rate "
- Himmat -
  - "Maan Jaaiye Maan Jaaiye" with Mohammed Rafi
  - "Hip Hip, Aao Piyo Peene Ka Zamana Aaya" with Mohammed Rafi
  - "Main Hoon Akeli"
  - "Jaal Bichhe Hain Nigahon Ke"
- Humjoli -
  - "Maan Jaaiye Maan Jaaiye" with Mohammed Rafi
  - "Gaon Ki Main Gori" with Kamal Barot
- Ilzam -
  - "Mere Hotho Ki Lali Jane Kisne Chura Li"
  - "Sawariya Aaye Hai Badarwa Chaye Hai"
  - "Tumhare Bina Hume Nindiya Na"
- Insaan Aur Shaitan -
  - "Koi Aaye Bahon Mein Le Le"
  - "Humne Jo Tumko Salam Kiya"
  - "Meri Ada Hai Aa Aa"
- Inspector -
  - "Haye Yeh Tera Dil"
  - "Pee Lo Pee Loo"
  - "Haaye Haye Kisiki Patli Kamar"
  - "Bura Tum Na Mano To Ek Bat Keh Doon" with Mohammed Rafi
  - "Marhaba Marhaba Marhaba Aye Husn"
- Ishq Par Zor Nahin - "Pyaar B Ik Baat Chali"
- Jawab -
  - "Aaja Meri Jaan Yeh Hai June Ka Mahina" with Kishore Kumar
  - "Chali Kahan Hansti Gaati" with Hemlata, and Mohammed Rafi
  - "Arre Amma Wohi Mua" with Hemlata
- Johnny Mera Naam -
  - "O Mere Raja Khafaa Na Hona" with Kishore Kumar
  - "Husn Ke Lakhon Rang"
- Kab? Kyun? Aur Kahaan? -
  - "Pyaar Se Dil Bhar De Nahin Nahin" with Mohammed Rafi
  - "Yeh Aankhen Jhuki Jhuki Si" with Usha Khanna
- Kaun Ho Tum - "Daiya Re Daiya Kya Hua, Dil Kho Gaya" with Usha Khanna
- Khilona -
  - "Mai Sharabi Nahin" with Mohammed Rafi
  - "Roz Roz Rozi" with Kishore Kumar
- Koi Ghulam Nahin -
  - "Koi Ghulam Nahin" with Manna Dey
  - "Aayi Milan Ki Bela" with Manna Dey
  - "Amma Ka Laal Hai Tu"
  - "Andhiyan Dooe Huyi Hain" with P. Susheela
- Maa Aur Mamta - "Tere Roop Ne Yeh Kaam Kiya" with Mohammed Rafi
- Maa Ka Aanchal -
  - "Jane Kya Hal Ho Kal Shishe Ka Paimane Ka"
  - "Waqt Meherbaan Hai"
  - "Teree Jhoothe Vade Ka Aetbar Kiya"
  - "Maa Ka Aanchal Laadale Daaman Hai Bhagwaan Ka"
  - "Bhanwar Mein Meree Naiya"
- Maharaja -
  - "Kitni Hasin Hai Mere Pyar Ki Nazar"
  - "Pee Ki Nazar Gore Tan Se Lipat Gayi"
  - "Maine Pee Li Mera Dil"
- Man Ki Aankhen -
  - "Arre Maa Gauri Maa"
  - "Bahut Der Tumne Sataya Hai Mujhko"
- Mangu Dada -
  - "Dhunde Na Milega Dildar Tumhe"
  - "Hosh Me Tum Bhi"
  - "Abhi To Baki Hai Kahani Raaton Ki"
  - "Peenewale Meri Aankho Se Piya"
- Mastana - "Hoye Nandlala Holi Khele, Biraj Mein Dhoom Maachi Hai" with Mohammed Rafi, and Mukesh
- Mera Naam Joker -
  - "Daag Na Lag Jaaye" with Mukesh
  - "Titar Ke Do Aage Titar" with Mukesh
  - "Kaate Na Kaate Raina" with Manna Dey
  - "Ang Lag Jaa Balmaa"
- Mere Humsafar - "Haye Mar Gayi"
- Mujrim -
  - "Raat Bhi Sard Hai"
  - "Mujrim Ye Mujrim Woh"
  - "Dil Ka Mehmaan Mujhe Kahan Chala Chhod Ke"
  - "Balle Shava Balle Shava" with Shamshad Begum, and Mahendra Kapoor
- My Love -
  - "Sunate Hai Sitare Raat Bhar Sabko Ye Afsana"
  - "Sunate Hai Sitare Raat Bhar"
  - "Bheegi Bheegi Raat Mein"
  - "Guzar Gaye Jo Haseen Zamane Khyaal Mein"
- Naya Raasta -
  - "Jaan Gayi Mai To Jaan Gayi" with Mohammed Rafi
  - "Chunar Mori Kori kori kori"
  - "Zulfon Ke Mahkte Saye Hai"
  - "More Saiyya Padu Paiya"
- Oos Rata Ke Baad -
  - "Bhari Mehfil Mein Ishaare Re Bulaya Kije"
  - "Bahut Achchhe Laago Toh Jaan Keh Doon" with Mukesh
- Pagla Kahin Ka - "Suno Zindagi Gaati Hai"
- Pardesi -
  - "Pardesi Piya Ho Pardesi Piya" with Mohammed Rafi
  - "Kal Ki Kuchh Adhoori Baatein Hai Zaroori"
- Patni -
  - "Aayi Aayi Nayi Dulhan Koyi" with Usha Mangeshkar
  - "Lakhon Mein Khumari Hai"
- Pavitra Papi -
  - "Le De Saiyan Odhni" with Mohammed Rafi
  - "Shada Shadak Dil Kare Dhak Dhak" with Usha Mangeshkar
  - "O Munni Ke Lalaa Hanji" with Usha Khanna
  - "Poochho Na Kaise Haye Ji"
- Pehchan - "Lo Aayi Hai Jawani Roop Ke Nagmein Gaati"
- Purab Aur Paschim -
  - "Twinkle Twinkle Little Star" with Mahendra Kapoor
  - "Hare Rama Hare Krishna" with Mahendra Kapoor
- Puraskar -
  - "Ae Meri Jaan Chand Sa Gora Mukhda" with Mukesh
  - "Natija Humari Mohabbat Ka Hai" with Mukesh
  - "Dekho To Kya Hai Aaj Ki Mehfil"
  - "Yeh Nashili Meri Aankhe"
- Priya - "Maa Tune Kyun Bheja Sasural" with Shammi
- Pushpanjali -
  - "Bade Haseen Bahanon Se"
- Raaton Ka Raja -
  - "Door Se Tera Deewana Aaya Hai, Ruk Jaa Zara" with Mahendra Kapoor
  - "Aye Dekho Toh, Yahan Koyi Nahin Hai"
- Rootha Na Karo -
  - "Aap Ka Chehra Mashallah, Zulf Ka Pehra Subhanallah" with Mohammed Rafi
  - "Mera Dil Hai Chulbula"
  - "Tumhare Rooth Jane Se"
- Saas Bhi Kabhi Bahu Thi - "Ran kahe Main Itni Jawaan Ho Gayi" with Usha Mangeshkar
- Saat Phere -
  - "Aji Hum Hi To Hai" with Usha Mangeshkar
  - "Ghunghar Baje Saath"
  - "Sata Ke Mujhko Dilruba"
  - "Tumse Dil Ki To Koi Baat"
- Sachaa Jhutha - "Karle Pyaar Karle"
- Samaj Ko Badal Dalo -
  - "Paayal Chham Chham Bole Sakhi" with Usha Mangeshkar
  - "Tum Apne Saheli Ko Itna Bataa Do" with Mohammed Rafi
  - "Yeh Mausam Yeh Khuli Hawa" with Mohammed Rafi
- Sawan Bhadon -
  - "Sun Sun Sun, O Gulabi Kali" with Mohammed Rafi
  - "Ek Dard Utha, Haay Ek Dard Utha" with Usha Khanna
  - "Aankhen Meri Maikhana"
  - "Ae Najarbaaz Saiyan"
  - "Mera Man Ghabraye"
  - "Akhiyan Na Maar"
- Sasta Khoon Mahenga Pyaar -
  - "Holo Hai Holi Aayi Re Holo Aayi" with Mukesh
  - "Pi Se Milna Ghazab Hua Raat Dhale"
  - "Roothe Roothe Sanan Tumhe Meri Kasam"
- Sau Saal Beet Gaye -
- Sharafat - "Ek Din Aap Ko Yaad Kiye Magar"
- Soldier Thakur Daler Singh -
  - "Hum Ne Suna Tha Bada Charcha Janaab Ka"
  - "Tum Ek Nazar Dekho To Idhar"
  - "Zameen Ke Chaand Tere Dil Mein"
- Suhana Safar - "Chudiyan Bazaar Se Mangwaa De" with Mohammed Rafi
- Taqat Aur Talwar -
  - "Chor Ko Dhoondhe Pehredaar"
- Tarzan 303 -
  - "Haye Re Haye Tera Jawab Kahan" with Usha Mangeshkar
  - "Jawani Pe Bahare"
  - "Tum Bhi Chup Ho"
- The Train -
  - "Chhaiya Re Chhaiya, Taaron Ki Chhaiya"
  - "Maine Dil Abhi Diya Nahi"
  - "O Meri Jaan Maine Kaha" with R D Burman
- Truck Driver -
  - "Jhuki Jaati Hai Kyun Nazren" with Mahendra Kapoor
  - "Aisa Ek Mehman Aaj Ghar Aaya"
  - "Tikhi Tikhi Nazre Ki"
- Tum Haseen Main Jawaan -
  - "Tum Haseen Main Jawaan" with Mohammed Rafi
  - "Cheenk Meri Jaan"
- Umang -
  - "Sachcha Pyaar Toh Jhuk Nahin Sakta"
  - "Na Main Hoon Main"
- Veer Abhimanyu -
  - "Kya Kahun Kaun Hi Tum" with Mahendra Kapoor
  - "Sundar Mukhda Khilta Jovan" with Mahendra Kapoor
  - "Aare Swamy Aare"
  - "Chhalia Kapti Gopiyo Wale"
  - "Kisne Chhu Liya Nazuk Tan"
- Veer Amarsingh Rathore -
  - "Ho Akhiya Milake Akhiya" with Usha Mangeshkar
  - "Haaye Dil De Diya Aise Dildar Ko"
  - "Pehli Pehli Aayi Milan Ki Raat"
- Yaadgar - "Baharon Ka Hai Sama"
- Ziarat Rahe Hind -
  - "Husn Ki Mehfil Mein Deewana Chala"

=== 1971 ===
- Aan Milo Sajna - "Palat Meri Jaan, Main Tere Qurbaan"
- Adhikar -
  - "Koi Mane Ya Na Mane, Jo Kal Tak The Anjane" with Kishore Kumar
  - "Tum To Sabke Ho Rakhwale"
  - "Sharaab Nahin Hoon"
- Aisa Bhi Hota Hai -
  - "Chand Rato Ko Nikle Na Nikle"
  - "Ram Jaane Kiski Lagi Haye Mujhko Najariya"
- Andaz -
  - "Mujhe Pyaas Aisi Pyaas Lagi Hai"
  - "Zindagi Ek Safar Hai Suhana (female)"
  - "Dil Usse Do Jo Jaan De De" with Mohammed Rafi
- Badnam Farishte -
  - "Na Saathi Hai Na Manzil Ka Pata"
  - "Nashili Aankho Se Nagar Sa Ek Baras Ke"
  - "Aaj Ka Vaada Pakka Haath Milao" with Mahendra Kapoor
- Bagawat -
  - "Naach Lo Jhoom Lo" with S. Janaki
  - "Laahi Laahi Japa Japa Japa"
  - "Khushiyon Ki Toh Duniya Mil"
  - "Chanda Se Pyaara O Teekhe Nainwala O"
  - "Baaz Aa Na Sata Payaliya"
- Balidaan - "Haaye Haaye Re Daiyya Moyi Mai To Kyo Jawaan Huyi" with Mahendra Kapoor
- Behroopia -
  - "Bhanwre Sun Sun Kahe Kare Gun Gun" with Mahendra Kapoor
  - "Uye Ma Uye Ma Koi Bachaye" with Usha Khanna
  - "Bin Baja O Sapere"
  - "O Re Banke Sipahiya Ran Banke"
  - "Kya Tu Hai Kya Wahi Hai" with Nandu Bohra
- Bikhre Moti -
  - "Ek Nazar Chahu Mai Halki Halki"
  - "Main Bhi Sochu Door Khada Hai Koun Ye Jentelman"
- Bombay Talkie - "Typewriter Tip Tip Tip" with Kishore Kumar
- Buddha Mil Gaya -
  - "Bhali Bhali Si Ek Surat" with Kishore Kumar
- Caravan -
  - "Goriyan Kahan Tera Desh" with Mohammed Rafi
  - "Ab Jo Mile Hain Toh"
  - "Piya Tu Ab Toh Aaja"
  - "Daiya Yeh Main Kahan Phaansi"
- Chahat -
  - "Humein Tumse Tumhein HumsShikayat Ho Toh Aisi Ho" with Mohammed Rafi
  - "Aa Tu Na Jaa Aisi Rut Mein"
- Chandan - "Aye Re Sakhi Jabse Laga Hau Saal Solva"
- Chhoti Bahu -
  - "Dulhaniya Bataa De Ri Ghoonghat Hataa Ke" with Usha Khanna
- Chingari -
  - "Tu Bol Na Bol" with Mahendra Kapoor
  - "Main Kaun Hoon, Main Kya Hoon" with Mahendra Kapoor
  - "Meri Baari Re Kaahe Ko Bhule" with Usha Mangeshkar
  - "Ae Yaar Muje Thaam"
  - "Pighli Aag Se Sagar Bhar Le"
- Daku Mansingh -
  - "Gol Pindaliyon Par Pehen Ke Resham Ka Pajama" with Mahendra Kapoor
  - "Tumse Kya Parda Karna"
- Dharti Ki God Mein -
  - "Ek Pyaar Ka Fasaana Sun Lo" with Mahendra Kapoor
  - "Milate Nahi Muskuraye Jaate Hai" with Mahendra Kapoor
  - "Kaaliya, Kaaliya, Hoth Tere Hai Gulab" with Mahendra Kapoor
- Do Boond Pani - "Jaa Ri Pawaniya Piya Ke Des Jaa"
- Do Raha -
  - "Tumhi Rehnuma Ho"
  - "Dole Jhumka Mera"
  - "Meri Bagiya Ki Kali"
- Duniya Kya Jane -
  - "Saanjh Savere Naina Tere Mere" with Kishore Kumar
  - "Bekhabar Bekhabar Bekhabar, Dekh Le Dekh Le Ek Nazar"
  - "Kitna Suhana Wo Din Hoga Jis Din Hamara Milan Hoga"
  - "Ek Tamasha Hu Mai Dekhiye Dekhiye"
- Ek Din Adhi Raat -
  - "Mera Dil Jhum Jhum Gaye"
  - "Saamne Aa Parda Hata" with Mohammed Rafi
  - "Chhedo Na Saiyan Ki Baate Sakhi" with Usha Timothy
- Ek Nari Ek Brahmachari -
  - "Are Tu Hai Buddhu Brahmachari" with Kishore Kumar, Manna Dey, and Sharda
  - "Lapa Tosa Nanapa" with Kishore Kumar
- Ek Thi Reeta -
  - "Jo Mere Pyar Par Ho Shak Toh" with Mohammed Rafi
  - "Bataun Baat Toh Baaton Se Baat" with Jagjit Singh
  - "Jane Kyo Pritam Na Aaye"
  - "Wah Wah Re Lachhi Tera" with Sarla Kapoor
  - "Mamma Says I Am Nineteen" with Hemdry Dargwitcz
- Elaan - "Aaj Tunhare Kaan Mein Yeh Keh Doon"
- Ganga Tera Pani Amrit -
  - "Is Dharti, Is Khule Gagan Ka Kya Kehna" with Mohammed Rafi
  - "O Ladke Makhan Se"
- Hare Rama Hare Krishna -
  - "Dum Maro Dum"
  - "Dum Maro Dum (version 2)"
  - "I Love You (Hare Krishna Hare Rama)" with Usha Uthup
- Haseenon Ka Devta -
  - "Preet Na Jaane Haye Haye"
  - "Jiske Liye Mera Dil Jale Haay"
  - "Dhadkan Kehti Hai O Sach Hi Kehti Hai"
  - "Balam Dewane Mujhe Chhod De" with Mohammed Rafi
- Hungama -
  - "Waah Ri Kismat Waah Waah" with Manna Dey
  - "Kachchi Kali Kachnaar Ki" with Manna Dey
  - "Meri Jawaani Teri Deewaani"
  - "Ai Door Se Baat Karna Ri" with Kishore Kumar
- Jai Bangladesh -
  - "Dil Tarse Tujhe Dekho" with Usha Mangeshkar
  - "Zindagi Tumne Laakho Ki"
- Jane Anjane - "Haye Chahe Tum Pyaar Kari Ya Bekaraar Karo"
- Jawan Mohabbat -
  - "Na Rutho Na Rutho Meri Jaan" with Mohammed Rafi
  - "O Mil Gayi Mere Sapnon Ki Rani" with Mohammed Rafi
  - "Mere Sapno Ki Rani Tum Nahin Ho" with Mohammed Rafi
  - "In Nigaahon Me Ghar Tumhara Hai"
- Johar Mehmood in Hong Kong - "Balam Calcutta Pahuchh Gahe" with Usha Mangeshkar
- Jwala -
  - "Aha Le Gayi O Jiya" with Lata Mangeshkar
- Kahin Aar Kahin Paar -
  - "Allah Allah, Kya Adaye Janab Laye Hai" with Shamshad Begum, and Mahendra Kapoor
  - "Kahin Aar Kahin Paar" with Usha Mangeshkar
  - "Dil Hai Hamara"
  - "Dil Mein Badi Badi Baate Hai"
  - "Jaam Hotho Se Laga Lu To"
- Kal Aaj Aur Kal -
  - "Ham Jab Honge Saath Saal Ke, Aur Tum Hogi" with Kishore Kumar
  - "Aap Yahaan Aaye Kis Liye" with Kishore Kumar
- Kathputli -
  - "Jeena Kaisa Ho Pyar Bina Jeena Kaisa"
  - "Ho Jai Jai Jal Raja" with Mahendra Kapoor
  - "Likha Hai Likha Hai Haan" with Kishore Kumar
- Kati Patang - "My Name Is Shabnam"
- Lagan -
  - "Ek Chhora Hai Gora Gora Hai"
  - "Tute To Tute Koi Dil Ka Sahara" with Mohammed Rafi
- Lakhon Mein Ek -
  - "Ye Duniya Khel Tamasha" with Mohammed Rafi
  - "Main Tera Nam Janu Na"
  - "Mere Samne Wale Kamre Me Ek Bhade Ka Tatu Rehta Hai" with Manna Dey
- Main Sundar Hoon -
  - "Mujhko Thand Lag Rahi Hai" with Kishore Kumar
  - "Naach Meri Jaan" with Kishore Kumar
  - "Kurukoo, Do Mastane Do Deewane, Ek Mai Hu Ek Tu" with Kishore Kumar
  - "Parivar Niyojan (Parody)" with Shahu Modak, Aruna Irani, Mehmood, Manna Dey, and Mukesh
  - "Khamosh Ye Aasmaan Hai Ye Kaun Hai" with Mukesh, and Manna Dey
- Man Mandir -
  - "Kahiye Ji Kya Loge"
  - "Aa Aaja Abhi Nahi Abhi Nahi" with Jishore Kumar
- Man Tera Tan Mera -
  - "Main Bhi Hoon, Tu Bhi Hai"
  - "Na Main Boli, Na Woh Bole"
  - "Kahin Kaanton Mein Mehak Hai"
- Maryada - "Dil Ka Lena Dena Humne" with Mohammed Rafi
- Mata Vaishno Devi -
  - "Chand Ne Aisa Jadoo Daala"
  - "O Nadaan Meri Mana, Tu Na Chhed Mujhe"
- Mela - "Mere Sakhiyo Bolo, Zara Mukhda Toh Kholo" with Mohammed Rafi
- Memsaab -
  - "Haye Re Mohe Laage"
- Murder In Circus -
  - "Duniya Mein Raho Aur Pyaar Karo"
  - "Banke Bahroopiya Usne Mera Dil Liya" with Usha Khanna
- Naag Pooja -
  - "Main Baalak Tum Jagpalak Ho"
  - "Gulaabi Ankhonwale Yeh Kya Pila Diya"
- Nadaan -
  - "Naach Ae Dil, Gaa Ae Dil"
  - "Bol Nadan Dil Tujhko Kya Ho Gaya"
  - "Uyi Chubh Gayi Karijava Mein"
- Padosi -
  - "Woh Pyar Humse Karte Hai, Ikraar Nahi Karte"
  - "Taqdeer Ke Bazaar Mein"
  - "Farz Roke Mohabbat Bulaye"
- Paras -
  - " Sajna Ke Samne Main To Rahungi Chup"
  - "O Jugni Kehti Hai Baat Pate Ki"
  - "Sachai Se Bad Kar Dharm Nhi Koi Duja" with Mahendra Kapoor
- Paraya Dhan -
  - "Aasha Gayi, Usha Gayi, Main Na Gayi"
  - "Aao Jhoome Gaaye Milke Dhoom Machayae" with Kishore Kumar
  - "Holi Re Holi, Rangon Ki Holi" with Manna Dey
- Parde Ke Peechhey -
  - "Teen Kanwariyaa Teen Kanwariya Haathon Mein Mehndi Racha De Koi" with Shamshad Begum, and Usha Mangeshkar
  - "Tum Jab Jab Samne Aate Ho" with Kishore Kumar
  - "Jab Husn Ka Jaadu Sir Pe Chad Ke Bolta Hai"
- Parwana -
  - "Chale Ladkhadaake"
  - "Piya Ki Gali Laage Bhali" with Parveen Sultana
  - "Jis Din Se Maine Tumko Dekha Hai" with Mohammed Rafi
  - "O Jameela Chhammak Chhallo" with Mohammed Rafi
- Patanga - "O Lahariayewali, O Motiwali" with Mohammed Rafi
- Preet Ki Dori -
  - "Jane Na Jane Dil Ki Baat"
  - "Roop Hai, Rang Hai"
- Preetam - "Hum Bhi Shikari, Tum Bhi Shikari"
- Purani Pehchan -
  - "Yeh Na Humse Poochhiye Mil Gaya Hai Kya Humko" with Mohammed Rafi
  - "Aaj Ki Raat Koyi Shamma Na Jalne Paaye"
  - "Mujhe Neend Aa Gayi Thi"
  - "Murali Na Chhed Kanha Mora Ang Ang Lehraye"
  - "Bachpan Ka Saath Chhuta Hai"
- Rakhwale - "Rehne Do Gile Shikwe" with Mohammed Rafi
- Reshma Aur Shera -
  - "Tauba Tauba Meri Tauba"
  - "Jab Se Lagan Lagaayi Re"
- Saat Sawal Yane Hatim Tai -
  - "Zindagi Mili Zindagi"
  - "Yeh Husn Teh Shabab Yeh Jawaani"
  - "Nazron Ki Chhori Jis Dil Pe Chali"
  - "Pyaar Leke Aaya Hai"
  - "Jaan-e-Mohabbat Jaan-e-Tamanna" with Mohammed Rafi
- Saaz Aur Sanam - "Pal Pal Botal Chhalke"
- Sampoorna Devi Darshan -
  - "Tumhare Sang Jeena Tha"
  - "Sansar Ki Kaisi Reet Hai"
  - "O Raja Aaja Na Mere Paas"
- Sanjog - "Man Mandir Mein Preet Ka Dera" with Lata Mangeshkar
- Sansar -
  - "Mere Babu Khilona Leja"
  - "Ab Bas Tarsana Chhod Do" with Kishore Kumar
- Seema -
  - "Waqt Thoda Sa Abhi Kuchh Aur Guzar Jaane De" with Kishore Kumar
  - "Kispe Hai Tera Dil, Naam Lena Mushkil" with Mohammed Rafi
- Shaan-e-Khuda -
  - "Milta Hai Kya Nmaaz Mein"
  - "Sai Kamali Wale"
  - "Rakhta Hai Jo Roza Kabhi"
  - "Yaa Nabi Salam Alaika"
- Sharmilee - "Reshmi Ujala Hai, Nakhmali Andhera"
- Sher-e-Watan -
  - "Meraa Mehboob Mujhko Mil Jaye"
  - "Zindagi Bhar Hume Tumse Pyaar Rahega"
  - "Zara Humse Milo" with Mukesh
- Shri Krishna Leela -
  - "Chandra Chhupaa Suraj Ugaa"
  - "Sharad Poonam Ki Suhani Raat"
  - "Palkon Ka Palna Naino Ki Dori"
  - "Tera Panth Nihar Kanhaiya Main To Gayi Hu Haar"
  - "Hathi Ghodaa Paalki Hathi Ghodaa Paalki" with Dolly Davjekar, and Sunil
  - "Nari Ek Doosri Dharti Aur Tisari Gaiyaa" with Usha Timothy
- Tere Mere Sapne[48] -
  - "Tha Thai Thatha Thai"
  - "Phur Ud Chala Hawaon Ke Sang"
  - "Mera Saajan Phool Kamaal Ka"
- Tulsi Vivah -
  - "Bhagwan Yeh De Vardaan"
  - "Tulsi Kunwari Bani Hai Dulhan"
  - "Mar Jayenge Hum Phir Bhi Sajan Yehi Kahenge"
  - "Arre Meri Sawa Lakh Ki Nathni Lut Gayi"
  - "Meri Tapasyaon Meri Sahay Karo"
  - "Natraj Mai Naari Niraali"
- Upaasna -
  - "Meri Jawani Pyar Ko"
  - "Mujhko To Peeni Hai"
  - "Tumhein Apna Na Banaya"
- Ustad Mera Naam -
  - "Aa Tose Miley Nain More Mitwa"
  - "O Sardar Subhan Allaah"
  - "Apna Dil Zara Thamo"
  - "Hai Jo Teri Tamanna"
- Ustad Pedro -
  - "Kal Ka Raaja Aaj Bhikhari" with Manna Dey
  - "Ye Khubsurat Sham Bahaaro Ke Salam"
  - "Kahan Giri Ram More"
  - "Saiyya Bele Ka Phool Mai Chameli Ki Kali"

=== 1972 ===
- Aan Baan - "Badnaam Ho Gaya Dil"
- Aankh Micholi -
  - "Dil Ki Murad Puri Ho Gayi"
  - "Deewani Chandni Raat Bhi Pagal"
  - "Aa Ja Re" with Kishore Kumar
- Aankhon Aankhon Mein -
  - "Aankhon Aankhon Mein Baat Hone Do" with Kishore Kumar
  - "Ho Tera Mera Mel Hai" with Kishore Kumar
  - "Yeh Do Baaten Pyaar Bhari Kar Loon" with Kishore Kumar
  - "Gora Rang Mera Gori Baahe" with Usha Mangeshkar
- Anokhi Pehchan -
  - "Yeh Mera Pehla Pehla Pyar Hai"
  - "O Mr Jolly Mera Naam Hai Miss Dolly"
- Apna Desh -
  - "Aaja O Mere Raja"
  - "Duniya Mein Logon Ko" with R D Burman
- Apradh -
  - "Tum Mile Pyaar Se" with Kishore Kumar
  - "Aye Naujawan Sab Kuchh Yahaan"
  - "Assalam Alaikum" with Mahendra Kapoor
- Baankelal -
  - "Kya Doge Dil Leke Babuji Bolo"
  - "Hum Yaad Me Unki Chandini Raate (female)"
  - "Hum Kisse Kahe Kya Shikwa Kare" with Shamshad Begum
- Baazigar -
  - "Meri Jhoom Ke Naachi Jawani"
  - "Aaj Aaya Hai Tu"
  - "Saiyan Mila Mohe Nadiya Kinare"
  - "Panwaran Hoon Main Lucknow Ki"
- Babul ki Galiyan -
  - "Mera Naam Hai Chaupati" with Mahendra Kapoor
  - "Ek Cheez Maangte Hain Hum Tumse" with Kishore Kumar
  - "Door Se Karna Nazara"
  - "Bairi Chhod De Mera Raasta"
  - "Pehle Soonghi Phir Chakhi"
- Baharon Phool Barsao -
  - "O Dharti Ke Chand"
  - "Suno Ek Baat Sanam"
- Bandagi -
  - "Phoolon Ki Taazgi Ho Tu" with Kishore Kumar
  - "Bade Anadi Seedhe Saadhe"
  - "Mera Naam Hai Jawaani Mastani"
- Bawarchi - "Hey Good Morning" with Kishore Kumar, Hridaynath Chattopadhyay, Nirmala Devi, and Lakshmi Shankar
- Be-Imaan -
  - "Dekho Ji Raat Ko Julam Ho Gaya"
  - "Patla Patla Reshami Kurta" with Mahendra Kapoor
  - "Chali Saj Ke Hai Dil Ko Milane Main" with Sharda
- Bees Saal Pehle - "Abhi Toh Dua Deke Bachpan Gaya Hai" with Kishore Kumar
- Bhai Ho To Aisa -
  - "Sun Le Naag Raja"
- Bharat Ke Shaheed -
  - "Aayega Dulha Mera, Baandh Ke Sehra"
  - "Mere Daaman Ki Thandi Hawa Chahiye Ya"
- Bhavna -
  - "Phir Milengi Kahan Aisi Tanhaiyan" with Mukesh
  - "Meri Iltija Hai Bas Ek Iltija Hain"
  - "Koi Vaada Nahin Hai Mulaqaat Kam" with Usha Mangeshkar
- Bijlee -
  - "Zara Bol De Gori Tera Saiyan Kaisa Hoga"
  - "Naina Jhapke, Kamariya Mori Lachke"
  - "Jaadugarni Aayi Prem Nagariya Se"
- Bindiya Aur Bandook -
  - "Chhori Loot Gayi Re, Tere Liye Sajna"
  - "Kela Aane Aane"
  - "Bindiya Lagaungi"
  - "Najariya Jhuka Ke"
- Bombay To Goa - "Haye Haye Yeh Thanda Pani"
- Daraar -
  - "Chhot Gayi Sakhiya, Bhar Aayi Ankhiyan" with Mohammed Rafi
  - "Kyun Chamke Bol Kuchh Bol" with Mohammed Rafi
- Dastan -
  - "Woh Koi Aaya Lachak Uthi"
  - "Hay Main Ki Kara"
  - "Maria My Sweetheart" with Mahendra Kapoor
- Dharkan -
  - "Maine Pehli Baar Dekha Gussa" with Kishore Kumar
  - "Jab Tu Ne Kuch Na Kiya" with Manna Dey
  - "Pee Meri Aankhon Se Aa Meri Baahon Mein"
  - "Tumse Nazar Mili Milte Hi Jhookane" with Kishore Kumar, and Ravi
- Dil Daulat Duniya -
  - "O Meri Lara Loo" with Kishore Kumar
  - "Masti Aur Jawani Ho" with Kishore Kumar, and Sharda
  - "Deep Jale Dekho" with Usha Khanna, and Rekha Jayker
- Dil Ka Raaja -
  - "Sundar Hoon Aisi Main"
  - "Bade Hain Shohrat Tumhara" with Mohammed Rafi
  - "Jinke Paad Haathi Ghoda" with Mohammed Rafi
- Do Bachche Dus Haath -
  - "Mar Gai Mai To Haye Rabba"
  - "Chal Laga Le Sutta"
- Do Gaz Zameen Ke Neeche - "Pee Ke Aaye Gharwa Bedardi"
- Do Yaar -
  - "Ni Loot Laye Aye Goriye" with Manna Dey, and Mohammed Rafi
  - "Kajre Ki Dhar Hai Katar"
  - "Mita Kar Har Tamannaa Aaj"
  - "Auro Ki Khushi Me Khush Rah Kar"
- Doctor X -
  - "Luk Chup Jaana Ye Mera Hai Nishana"
  - "Ye Raat Bhi Hai Jawaan"
  - "Badi Khushi Hui Aap Se Milkar" with Mohammed Rafi
  - "Sukh Dukh Me Rahenge Saath" with Mahendra Kapoor
- Ek Baar Muskura Do -
  - "Chehare Se Zaraa Aanchal" with Mukesh
  - "O O Ye Dil Le Kar Nazrana" with Mukesh
  - "Ek Bar Muskura Do" with Kishore Kumar
  - "Kitne Atal The" with Kishore Kumar
- Ek Bechara - "Saagar Labon Se Laga Le"
- Ek Hasina Do Diwane -
  - "Aaja Ya Aa Jane De Paas" with Kishore Kumar
  - "Prem Pujarin Maang Mein Bharke"
- Ek Khilari Bawan Pattey -
  - "Behrupiye Log Sare Firte Hai"
  - "Jab Pyaar Ka Mujh Mein Ujala"
  - "Jiyo Mere Ladle Tujhko Najar Na Lage"
  - "Le Le Ye Dil Ka Nagina"
- Gaaon Hamara Shaher Tumhara - "Kaise Kahun Kisse Kahun"
- Garam Masala -
  - "Haay Re, Na Maaro"
  - "Mujhko Bacha Le Meri Maa" with Mohammed Rafi
  - "Chunri Dharke Kinare Gori Nadiya Nahaay" with Mohammed Rafi
- Gomti Ke Kinare -
  - "Aao Aao Jaane Jahan" with Kishore Kumar
  - "Jackpot Lag Gaya" with Manna Dey
- Gun Fighter Johnny -
  - "Aaja O Mere Raja"
  - "Chutney Jitni Pee Lo"
  - "Haath Chhudakar Jaanewale"
  - "Gore Sajan Teri Meri Lagan" with Mahendra Kapoor
  - "Teri Tundi Meri Mundi Todunga" with Mahendra Kapoor
- Haar Jeet -
  - "Itne Din Tum Kahan Rahe" with Kishore Kumar
  - "Tu Badi Kismatwali Hai" with Lata Mangeshkar
- Hum Tum Aur Woh -
  - "So Baaton Ki Mujhko Tamanna" with Kishore Kumar
  - "Hai Re Hai, Jawani Aayi Aisi Nirdayi"
  - "Husn Agar Zid Pe Aa Jaaye"
  - "Tu Mila Le Aaj Nigaho Ko Tu Mila Le Aaj Nigaho Ko" with Vinod Khanna
- Hunterwali - "Hai Chor Kahin Ka"
- Jai Jwala -
  - "Maa Tu Durga Tu Vaishnav"
  - "Mere Aangana Mein Jhumti Gaati"
  - "Rang Hu Nur Hu"
- Jangal Mein Mangal -
  - "Awara Bhanwro Sharm Karo" with Usha Mangeshkar
  - "Dekhta Hai Kya Dekhta Hai Kya"
  - "Meri Nazro Ne Kaise Kaise Kaam Kar Diye"
  - "Ada Aayi Jafa Aayi Gurur Aaya"
- Jawani Diwani -
  - "Nahi Nahi, Abhi Nahi" with Kishore Kumar
  - "Jaanejaan, Dhoondhta Phir Raha" with Kishore Kumar
  - "Agar Saaz Chheda, Taraane Banenge" with Kishore Kumar
  - "Haye Tauba"
- Joru Ka Ghulam - "Mera Chain Khoya Hua Hai" with Kishore Kumar
- Kanch Aur Heera -
  - "Ek Kadwi Ej Meethi"
- Kaun Sachcha Kaun Jhootha -
  - "Saawan Hai Kaisa Mera"
  - "Dekho Jawani Chum Chum Naache"
- Kundan -
  - "Aa Gaya Hai Panchi"
  - "Uthne De Parda Chalne De Teer"
  - "Haatho Me Bottol" with Usha Mangeshkar
- Lal Patthar -
  - "Re Man Sur Mein Gaa" with Manna Dey
  - "Phoolon Se Meri Sej Sajao"
  - "Sooni Sooni Saans Ki Sitaar Par"
  - "Aaja, Dikhaaon Tujhe Jannat Ki Shaam"
- Lalkaar - "Maine Kahan Na Na"
- Mangetar -
  - "Ye Dil Bhi Tera Ye Jan Bhi Teri"
  - "Ham Sharabi Sab Sharabi"
  - "Teri Laila Banke Teri Heer Banke" with Mohammed Rafi, and Usha Mangeshkar
- Mehmil -
  - "Kitna Hai Suna Suna (duet)" with Mohammed Rafi
  - "Meri Jaan Hai Sona" with Mohammed Rafi
  - "Humse Milna Thik Nahi"
  - "Kash Main Ladki Hota"
- Mere Jeevan Saathi - "Aao Na, Gale Lagao Na"
- Milap -
  - "Bajariya Ke Beech"
  - "Kehne Ka Raaz Hai"
- Mome Ki Gudiya - "Nainon Ki Gaadi Chali"
- Naag Panchami -
  - "Sajne Do Aangna, Rachne Do Mehndi"
- Parchhaiyan -
  - "O Garam Garam Kaya, Thandi Thandi Lehar"
  - "Sanson Mein Kabhi, Dil Mein Kabhi" with Mohammed Rafi
- Parichay - "Sare Ke Sare Gama Ko Lekar Gaate Chale" with Kishore Kumar
- Pistolwali -
  - "Kya Hua Kya Hua Dil Ko"
  - "Kaisa Hai Gham Tere Saath Hardum"
  - "Hoga So Hoga Re Aisa Kyun Dikhta"
  - "Hey Udti Si Chidiya"
  - "Hai Maa Ladi Hai"
- Putlibai -
  - "Babu Chhedo Na"
  - "Kaise Besharm Aashiq Hai"
  - "Mere Meet Bata Tujhe Mujhse Kab Pyaar Hua" with Kishore Kumar
- Pyar Diwana -
  - "Ab Mai Jaanu" with Kishore Kumar
  - "Haye Mere Allah Yeh Kya Baat Huyi" with Usha Mangeshkar
  - "Ye Zindagi Bhi Kya Hai"
  - "Mera Saiyan Bada Albela"
- Raampur Ka Lakshman -
  - "Kahe Apnon Ka Kaam Nahi" with Kishore Kumar
  - "Sanwla Rang Hai Mera"
- Raaste Kaa Patthar -
  - "Main Hardam Kisi Ko Dhundta Hoon" with Mukesh
  - "Ib Tum Paas Na Aana, Door Hi Rehna" with Mukesh
  - "Mujhse Kahan Tu Bachke Jaayega"
  - "Main Sharab Bechti Hoon"
- Rakhi Aur Hathkadi -
  - "Achhi Nahin Sanam Dillagi Dil-E-Bekarar Se" with Kishore Kumar
  - "Tum To Kya Ho Ji, Tum Ho Meri Chhaya" with Kishore Kumar
  - "Tere Milan Ko Kaise Chalun"
  - "Jeeye Tumharo Lalna"
  - "Aaja Aaja Sajan (Part 1)"
  - "Aaja Aaja Sajan (Part 2)"
  - "Bahiya Dharke Lipta"
- Rani Mera Naam -
  - "Andhera Andhera"
  - "Tum Bhi Jhuthe"
  - "Lap Jhap Kahan Jate Ho Jani"
  - "Sare Jag Se Achha Apna Pyara Hindustan" with Manna Dey
- Return of Johnny -
  - "Oh My Lovely Darling" with Mohammed Rafi
  - "Tumko Mere Naina Chume" with Mohammed Rafi
  - "O Balma Dil Tujhpe Hai Qurbaan"
  - "Mere Sapnon Mein Aaye Jo"
  - "Maan Jaa Are Buddhu Jaan Jaa"
  - "Hello Anadi Bhole Babu"
- Rivaaj - "Tujh Mein Hoon Main, Mujh Mein Hain Tu" with Mohammed Rafi
- Rut Rangeeli Ayee -
  - "Ek Zara Sa Kaam Karo" with Kishore Kumar
  - "Shola Hoon Jawaan"
- Samaanta - "Main Toh Chup Hi Rahungi"
- Samadhi -
  - "O Yaara Yaara"
  - "Jab Tak Rahe"
- Savera - "Jam Jam Ke Naach Babua"
- Sazaa -
  - "Hum Hai Teen Tum Ho Chaar" with Usha Mangeshkar, and Minoo Purushottam
  - "Beech Wale Saiyaa Se Ladh Gayi Najariya" with Mohammed Rafi
  - "O Roop Ki Raani Dekh Phul Woh Kali" with Mohammed Rafi
  - "Ye Hai Husn Bhi Hai Ek Maikhana"
  - "Naam Mera Hai Banto Jatti" with Mohammed Rafi, Manna Dey, and Minoo Purushottam
- Seeta Aur Geeta -
  - "O Saathi Chal" with Kishore Kumar
  - "Are Zindagi Hai Khel" with Manna Dey
- Shaher Se Door -
  - "Mere Pyar Ka Aaj Mahurat Hai" with Mohammed Rafi
  - "Aankhon Ne Kiya Ishara"
- Shararat -
  - "Kal Raat Sapne Mein Aaye The Tum"
  - "Chilman Ka Gir Jaana Allah Allah"
- Sub Ka Sathi - "Dil Toh Dil Hai" with Kamal Barot
- Subah-O-Shaam -
  - "Teri Meri Meri Teri Nazar" with Kishore Kumaar
- Sultana Daku -
  - "Aake Apni Suratiya Dikhaya Jaya Karo"
  - "Bhor Hote Baalam Chale Jayenge Mai Ro Ro Marungi"
  - "Tune Dil Meraa Churaya Hai Bhari Mehfil Mein"
  - "Humko Bhi Munna Dila De Upar Waale" with Mohammed Rafi
- Tangewala -
  - "Do Diwane Aaye" with Mohammed Rafi
  - "Aisa Phanda Mare Gori" with Mohammed Rafi
- Tanhaai -
  - "Karishma Dekho Nazara Dekho"
  - "La La La Ae Mister Edher Aao"
- Wafaa - "Hum Sab Mastane Hippie" with Kishore Kumar
- Yaar Mera -
  - "Husnwalon Ke Panje Mein Aa"
- Zameen Aasman -
  - "Hum Tum Chale" with Kishore Kumar
  - "Kisne Yaha Kisko Jaana"
  - "Ek Raat Ki Hai Baat, Main Soyi Thi Akeli"

=== 1973 ===
- Aaj Ki Taaza Khabar -
  - "Khilta Hua Shabab Hai"
  - "Happy Birthday To Pinky"
- Aangan -
  - "Madira Hi Madira Tere Badan Mein" with Mukesh
  - "Holi Hai" with Manna Dey
  - "Khatrey Jo Uthhaeyga"
  - "Makhan Se Bhi Chikna Badan" with Chandrani Mukherjee
- Agni Rekha -
  - "Hawaen Payal Baja Rahi Hain"
  - "Jan-E-Man Jan-E-Jan"
  - "Lut Gaya Hai Kiska Dil"
- Anamika -
  - "Lago Na Maaro Ise"
  - "Aaj Ki Raat Koi Aane Ko Hai"
  - "Jau To Kaha Jau Sab Kuch Yahi Hai"
- Anhonee -
  - "Maine Honthon Pe Lagayi Toh"
  - "Balma Hamaar Motor Car Leke Aayo Re"
  - "Main To Ek Pagal" with Kishore Kumar
- Anokhi Ada -
  - "Jawaani Tera Bolbala, Budhape Tera Munh Kaala" with Manna Dey
  - "Gum Gayi, Gum Gayi"
- Bada Kabutar -
  - "Haye Re Haye Re, Yeh Dil Mera" with Kishore Kumar
  - "Chanda Mama Bole"
  - "Mubarak Ho Yeh Raat Jawan"
  - "Raaz Ki Ek Baat Hai"
- Banarasi Babu - "Aap Yahan Se Jaane Ka" with Kishore Kumar
- Bandhe Haath -
  - "O Majhi Re, Jayen Kahan"
  - "Dil To Lai Gawa, Ab Ka Hoga Re" with R D Burman, Manna Dey, and Mahendra Kapoor
- Barkha Bahar - "Jalla De Tu Hi Koi Aag"
- Bindiya Aur Bandook -
  - "Chhori Loot Gayi Re"
  - "Nazariya Jhuka Ke Marungi"
  - "Bindiya Lagaungi"
  - "Kela Aane Do Kele Aane Ke"
- Chaalak -
  - "Piye Jaa Jiye Jaa" with Kishore Kumar
  - "Dil Ka Nazrana Le" with Kishore Kumar
- Chhalia - "O Jaane Man" with Kishore Kumar
- Chhupa Rustam -
  - "Jaloon Main, Jaloon Main"
  - "Dheere Se Jana Khatiyan Mein" with Kishore Kumar
  - "Main Hoon Chhuee Muee"
- Chhote Sarkar -
  - "O Jhuke Jhuke Nainonwali" with Mohammed Rafi
  - "Roz Roz Kya Peena Ji"
- Chori Chori - "Hamse Kar Le Dosti, Le Thodi Si Aur Pee"
- Daman Aur Aag -
  - "Thirka Badan Toh Geeton Ke" with Lata Mangeshkar
  - "Muskurati Huyi Ek Husn Ki Tasveer Ho Tum" with Mohammed Rafi
- Dharma -
  - "Maine Teri Gunehgaar Hoon" with Mohammed Rafi
  - "Raaz Ki Baat Keh Du To Jane Mehfil Me Phir Kya Ho" with Mohammed Rafi
  - "Aur Saqi Jo Kal Ko Hai Bachi" with Omi
- Dhund -
  - "Uljhan Sulajhe Na"
  - "Jo Yaha Tha Wo Wahan" with Usha Mangeshkar
  - "Jubna Se Chunariya" with Manna Dey
- Do Phool -
  - "Maaf Karo Haa Maaf Karo (version 1)" with Kishore Kumar, Usha Mangeshkar, and Mehmood
  - "Maaf Karo Haa Maaf Karo (version 2)" with Kishore Kumar, Usha Mangeshkar, and Mehmood
  - "Muthu Kodi Kawari Hadaa" with Mehmood
  - "Maaf Karo O Baba" with Kishore Kumar, Usha Mangeshkar, and Manna Dey
  - "Maaf Karo O Baba (Part 2)" with Kishore Kumar, Usha Mangeshkar, and Manna Dey
- Double Cross -
  - "Aiyo Aiyo Keh Do" with Kishore Kumar
  - "Jeevan Bhar Ke Loye" with Kishore Kumar
  - "Maine Tumko Chaha Pehli Baar" with Kishore Kumar
- Ek Kunwari Ek Kunwara - "Pehli Baar Pehli Haar Hui" with Kishore Kumar
- Ek Mutthi Aasmaan -
  - "Baat Baat Hai Ek Raat Ki"
  - "Tu Tu Hai Qaatil, Tera Bachna Hai Mushkil"
- Ek Nao Do Kinare -
  - "Yeh Sha Hai Dhuan Dhuan"
  - "Main Haari Tose Sajna Naina Milake"
- Ek Nari Do Roop - "Tum Samjho To Achcha Hai" with Kishore Kumar
- Gaai Aur Gori -
  - "Raja Meri Matki Ko"
  - "Main Teri Nigahon Se"
- Gehri Chaal -
  - "Bada Pyara Lage Tu"
  - "Sham Bheegi Bheegi"
  - "Mara Vade Ne Tere Aise"
  - "Jaipur Ki Choli Mangwa De Re Saiyan" with Kishore Kumar
- Ghulam Begam Badshah -
  - "Raste Raste Janewali, Lehrake Lat Kali Kali" with Kishore Kumar
  - "Kaahe Ko Kali Se Main"
- Guru Aur Chela -
  - "Yeh Surkhiya Ye Laaliya" with Mohammed Rafi, and Ghulam Mohammad
  - "Main Jidhar Jidhar Jaao Ki Dilbar Naye Naye"
  - "Sadke Tera Roop Salauna" with Usha Mangeshkar
  - "Yeh Raate Sajeeli Nashili Jawaan"
- Haathi Ke Daant - "Man Ka Mere Tan Ka Mere Singaar Tum Hi Ho"
- Hanste Zakhm -
  - "Gali Gali Mein Kiya Re Badnaam"
- Heera - "Ek Chhokroya Beech Bajariya" with Kishore Kumar, Usha Khanna, and Mukri
- Heera Panna -
  - "Ek Paheli Hai Tu" with Kishore Kumar
- Hifazat -
  - "Mere Hamrahi, Mere Pyar"
  - "Aiya Habbi, Aiya Habbi"
  - "Yeh Mastani Dagar"
- Honeymoon -
  - "Do Dil Mile" with Kishore Kumar
  - "Jeevan Hai Ek Sapna" with Kishore Kumar
  - "Mere Pyase Man Ki Bahar" with Kishore Kumar
- Hum Junglee Hain -
  - "Na Mehndi Racha Saki"
  - "Main Mehndi Rachaoongi"
- Hum Sub Chor Hain -
  - "Aaja Mere Saathi"
  - "Dekhoon Kisko Chahoon Kisko"
- Insaf -
  - "Tu Kathputli Naach Mere Hath Teri Dor"
  - "Mera Naam Mai Tera Naam Tu" with Shailendra Singh
- Jai Hanuman -
  - "Tum Kahan Ho Pran Pyare"
  - "Bole Bole Re Are Bol Brhmachari"
  - "Aaya Aaya Re Aaya Aaya Basant Aaya"
  - "Re Re Bahaar Aayi" with Mahendra Kapoor
- Jaise Ko Taisa -
  - "Kaun Si Hai Woh Cheez Jo Yahan Nahin Milti" with Kishore Kumar
  - "Bhaiya Re, Bhaiya Re, Paap Ki Naiya Re" with Kishore Kumar
- Jalte Badan - "Aag Se Aag Bujha Pe, Ghan Na Kar" with Lata Mangeshkar
- Jeevan Sukh -
  - "Meri Paayal Kahin Na Kuchh Keh De"
- Jheel Ke Us Paar - "Haye Bichhua Das Gayo Re"
- Joshila -
  - "Sharma Na Yu Ghabara Na" with Dev Anand
  - "Dil Me Jo Baate Hain" with Kishore Kumar
  - "Sona Rupa Layo Re"
  - "Kanp Rahi Main Abhi Zara Tham Janam"
- Jwaar Bhata -
  - "Hothon Pe Tera Naam"
  - "Peene Ki Der Hai Na Pilane Ki"
- Kahani Kismat Ki -
  - "Kab Tak Na Dogi Dil" with ‌solo
  - "Tu Yaar Mera, Dildaar Mera" with ‌solo
- Kashmakash -
  - "Kashmakash Chhod De"
  - "Pyar Tujhe Aisa Karungi"
  - "Mere Peechhe Hai Deewane, Aage Aage Mastane" with Shatrughan Sinha
- Keemat - "Rang Roop Ka Bazaar Hai"
- Khoon Khoon -
  - "Kitni Thandi Pawan Aaja" with Tirath Singh
  - "Meri Aankho Mein Masti Hai" with Vijay Singh
- Kisan Aur Bhagwan -
  - "Ban Gayi Baat Sajna" with Kishore Kumar
  - "Badi Door Se Ho Ji"
- Kora Aanchal -
  - "Aap Agar Mujhko Ijazat De" with Mohammed Rafi
  - "Kaha Se Kaha Aa Gai Zindagani"
  - "Mere Dil Se Khelo"
  - "Rona Mere Naseeb Hai"
  - "Umeedon Ke Khilone"
- Kunwara Badan -
  - "Kal Ki Na Soch"
  - "Haathon Mein Mehndi Rachai Jayegi"
- Loafer -
  - "Kahan Hai Woh Deewana"
  - "Motiyon Ki Ladi Hoon Main"
  - "Koi Shaheri Babu"
- Maha Sati Savitri -
  - "Chupke Chupke Chupchap" with Mahendra Kapoor
  - "Hansa Rana Na Jao Chod Ke"
  - "Meri Dunia Badal Gayi Aaj Re"
  - "Naino Ki Kothari Saja Ke"
- Mera Desh Mera Dharam -
  - "Lakho Ussey Salaam"
  - "Ruk Jaao O Jaani Ruk Jaao"
  - "Matwali Raftar Qayamat Payal Ki Jhankar" with Usha Mangeshkar
- Mera Shikaar -
  - "Dil Ki Laagi Ko Koi Na Jaane"
  - "Teri Mehfil Mein Aaye Hain" with Mohammed Rafi, and Usha Mangeshkar
  - "Teri Chaahat Mein Jiye" with Mohammed Rafi, and Usha Mangeshkar
- Mere Gharib Nawaz - "Shikasta Saaz Hain"
- Naag Mere Saathi -
  - "Chhaliye Tum Chhaliye"
  - "Nilkanth Mahadev Ki Tumhe"
  - "Aaja Re Tu Aaja Re"
- Nafrat -
  - "Mere Yaar Dildaar, Jo Na Hota Tera Pyaar" with Kishore Kumar
  - "Dhalta Yeh Aanchal, Chadhti Jawaani"
  - "Lo Mera Pyaar Le Lo"
- Nai Duniya Naye Log - "Mujhe Tere Baahon Mein Na Jaane Kya Milta Hai"
- Naina -
  - "Hone Laagi Hai Raat Jawaan"
- Namak Haraam - "Sooni Re Sejaria" with Usha Mangeshkar
- Nanha Shikari -
  - "Tu Meri Manzil, Main To Raahi Hoon Sanam" with Kishore Kumar
  - "Mushkil Jeena Hai Yahan"
- Naya Nasha -
  - "Mujhse Aisi Bhool Hui"
  - "Kash Pe Kash Lagane De"
- Nirdosh -
  - "Tujhe Pyaar Se Kya Maarun"
  - "Koi Mantar Maar De Aisa"
  - "Koi Pyaar Se Tohe Dekhe Sanwariya" with Mohammed Rafi
- Not Available - "Chhumak Chhumak"
- Phagun -
  - "Kab Maane O Dil Ke Mastaane" with Kishore Kumar
- Pyar Ka Rishta -
  - "Oye Nakh Nakh Nakhrewali" with Kishore Kumar
  - "Hay Hay Dukhi Jaaye Mori Kamariya"
  - "Mera Naam Hai Flory" with Sharda
- Pyasi Nadi -
  - "Zaalim Ne Pila Di"
  - "Three Six Two Four"
  - "Laakh Yugo Ka Ek Baras Ho"
- Raja Rani - "Jab Andhera Hota Hain" with Bhupinder Singh
- Rani Aur Jani -
  - "Hum Jo Mile Toh Sara Zamana Jale" with Kishore Kumar
  - "Mera Chehra Sunehara Gulaab Rasiya"
  - "Mubarak Ho Tumhe Pyaare" with Usha Mangeshkar
- Rickshawala -
  - " Phulo Ki Duniya Se" with Kishore Kumar
  - "Main Haseen Hu Mai Jawan Hoon"
  - "Main Ghazab Ki Cheez Hoon"
- Rocky Mera Naam -
  - "Gham-e-Aashiqui Mein Hai Kya Maza"
  - "Deewana Dil Hai Pyaar Ka"
- Saudagar -
  - "Kyun Laayo Saiyan Paan"
  - "Sajna Hai Mujhe"
- Shareef Badmaash -
  - "Mohabbat Baazi Jitegi"
  - "Neend Chura Ke Raaton Mein" with Kishore Kumar
- Sone Ke Haath -
  - "Saheli Poochhun Ek Paheli" with Usha Khanna
  - "Kidher Ja Rahe Ho Kaha Ja Rahe Ho"
  - "Leilo Champa Chameli Gulab Leilo"
  - "Inse Milye Ye Yaaro Ke Yaar Bhi Hai"
- Sweekar - "Kahin Pyaar Ho Na Jaaye"
- Taxi Driver -
  - "Khaa Kar Tune Paan" with Mohammed Rafi
  - "Teri Nili Nili Jacket" with Mohammed Rafi
  - "Balam Harjaiyi Ja Mai To"
  - "Jinhe Ho Pyar Sanam"
- Vishnu Puran -
  - "O Maa Itni Toh Daya Kar De"
  - "O Vishnu, O Ramakrishna, O Sab Ke Ishwar"
  - "Tumhari Hoon, Mere Ho Tum" with Mohammed Rafi
  - "Tumhari Hoon, Mere Ho Tum" with Mohammed Rafi
- Woh Raat Wohi Awaaz -
  - "Mera Man Bhatak Raha Deewana"
  - "Sochta Hai Kya"
  - "Aayi To Se Milne Deewana Dil Le Ke" with Usha Khanna
- Yaadon Ki Baraat -
  - "Chura Liya Hai Tumne Jo Dil Ko" with Mohammed Rafi
  - "Aapke Kamare Me Koyee Rehata Hai" with Kishore Kumar, and R D Burman
  - "Dil Mil Gaye Ho To Hum Khil Gaye" with Kishore Kumar
  - "O Meri Soni, Meri Tamanna" with Kishore Kumar
  - "Lekar Ham Deewana Dil" with Kishore Kumar
- Yauwan -
  - "Kuch Chhaaye He Aa"
  - "Jalta Hai Yeh Tan"
  - "Yeh Reshmi Andhera Mit Jaane Ka"
  - "Bandariya Naach Dikhaye"
- Zanjeer -
  - "Dil Jalon Ka Dil Jala Ke"
  - "Chakku Chhuriyan Tez Kara Lo"

=== 1974 ===
- 36 Ghante - "Jaane Aaj Kya Hua" with Kishore Kumar
- 5 Rifles -
  - "Malmal Mein Badan Mora Chamke"
- Aahat - "Raat Badi Nasheeli Hai"
- Aarop -
  - "Sab Kuchh Mila Tu Na Mila"
  - "Chale Aao Na Satao"
- Aashiana - "Pyaar Pykare Singaar Pukare" with Mahendra Kapoor
- Ajnabee -
  - "Satrah Baras Ki Chhokriyan"
- Albeli - "Kaa Kari Kaa Kari, Pehle Pehle Pyaar Maa Tu Aankh Ladaayi" with Manna Dey
- Alingan -
  - "Chilam Ka Ek Dum"
  - "Humare Dil Ko Tumne Dil Bana Diya" with Mohammed Rafi
- Ang Se Ang Laga Le -
  - "Charno Me Tere Jo Aa Ke Gira"
  - "Pyar Sajao Bahare Lootao"
- Archana -
  - "Jab Hum hai Tere Saath, Toh Darne Ki Kya Baat"
  - "Jo Dil Mein Chubha"
- Asliyat - "Armaan Se Khelte Hai, Toofan Se Khelte Hai"
- Avishkaar -
  - "Naina Hain Pyaase Mere"
- Azad Mohabbat - "Baat Ek Nazar Ek Baar Idhar Bhi Ho Jaaye"
- Badla -
  - "Koi Chori Chori Chupke Chupke Mujhse Chupke"
  - "It Happens Aisa Hota Hai"
  - "Jata Hai To Ja O Sanam, Nikla Bada Bepeer Tu"
  - "Jane Walo Idhar Dekho Khade Hai Hum Raste Mein" with Minoo Purushottam
- Badhti Ka Naam Dadhi - "Bhole Re Saajan, Are Jaate Ho Kahan" with Kishore Kumar
- Balak Dhruv -
  - "Naagan Hu Main Chandan Ban Ki"
  - "He Jag Ke Bhagwan Aao Aao Mujhe Apnao"
- Bazaar Band Karo -
  - "Nahin Chhodoge Kabhi Mera Saath" with Kishore Kumar
  - "Har Ek Dil Ko Humne"
  - "Pyaasi Nigahon Me Sajan"
- Benaam - "Aa Raat Jaati Hai" with Mohammed Rafi
- Bidaai -
  - "Main Jaa Rahi Thi Lekin"
- Call Girl -
  - "Hum Hai Jahan, Woh Pyaar Ki Mehki" with Kishore Kumar
  - "Dil Jale Toh Koi Aaya Kare"
- Charitraheen -
  - "Daaga Beimaan Dai Gaya"
  - "Teri Meri Yaari Badi Purani"
- Chattan Singh -
  - "Mera Chimata Bole Chhanak Chhanak Chhan" with Mukesh
  - "Jab Koi Ladki, Jab Koi Ladki Baar Baar" with Kishore Kumar
  - "Main Toh Nahi Jaana Sasural"
- Chhote Sarkar -
  - "O Jhuke Jhuke Nainonwali, Aaja Mere Paas" with Mohammed Rafi
  - "Kya Roz Roz Peena"
- Chor Machaye Shor -
  - "Paon Mein Dori, Dori Mein Ghunghroo" with Mohammad Rafi
  - "Agre Se Ghaghro Manga De"
  - "Le Jayenge, Le Jayenge, Dilwale Dulhaniya Le Jayenge" with Kishore Kumar
- Chowkidar -
  - "Thoda Sa Aitbaar Kijiye"
  - "Aji Rehne Do Chanda Badli Mein"
  - "Zindagi Zindagi, Chhoti Ho Ya Lambi Ho" with Mohammed Rafi, and Mukesh
- Dagdarbabu - "Jaagi Ho Sadguru"
- Dawat -
  - "Tadap Tadap Ke Guzaari Hai Zindagi Humne"
  - "Aa Zara Mere Paas"
  - "Aise Bhi Na Rootho Tum" with Mukesh
- Dhamkee -
  - "Yaaro Mujhe Peene Do Peeke Behekne Do"
  - "Kon Wafadaar Hai Kon Bewafa Hai" with Usha Mangeshkar
  - "Hum Safar Gham Na Kar" with Usha Mangeshkar
  - "Chand Kya Hai" with Kishore Kumar
- Dil Diwana -
  - "Kisi Se Dosti Karlo" with Kishore Kumar
  - "Ja Re Jaa Bewafa, Nahi Tujhko Pata" with Kishore Kumar
  - "Khan Chacha, Ye Ladki Mujhe Pyar Karti Hai" with Kishore Kumar
  - "Main Ladki Hoon Tu Ladka"
  - "Mujhko Mohabbat Mein Dhokha" with Kishore Kumar, and Manna Dey
- Do Aankhen - "Babu Babu Dil Pe Nahin Kabu"
- Do Chattane -
  - "Jisne Dekha Wo Bola Ye Bijli"
  - "Mud Yaar Mera Ghar Aaya" with Minoo Purushottam
- Do Nambar Ke Ameer -
  - "Dil Kisi Ko Jo Diya Na Ho" with Kishore Kumar
  - "Roop Ka Nasha Hai"
  - "Insaniyat Ke Naam Pe Koi"
  - "Nashe Di Yeh Bandh Botalen"
- Doosri Sita -
  - "Aayi Re Aayi"
  - "Tu Jahan Mile Mujhe"
- Duniya Ka Mela - "Dil Tod Ke Sadak Par"
- Farebi -
  - "Jab Suni Ho Gali, Khuli Jogi Khidki"
- Ganga - "Pyaar Se Koi dil Deta Hai" with Mohammed Rafi
- Geetaa Mera Naam -
  - "Mujhe Maar Daalo"
- Goonj -
  - "Kar Loongi Duja Koi" with Mohammed Rafi
  - "Re Mita De Tu Agar Mujhko Mitana Hai Re"
- Hamrahi -
  - "Mehfil Mein Husn Mera"
  - "Saiyan Ne Baiyan Pakadke"
- Hanuman Vijay - "Haan Keh De Toh Aaj Yeh Laaj Ka Aanchal Hata Doon"
- Hawas -
  - "Kal Raat Usne"
  - "Aao Yaaron Gaao"
  - "Yeh Hawas Kya Hai"
  - "Apne Dil Mein Jagah"
- Humshakal -
  - "Hum Tum, Gumsum Raat Milan Ki" with Kishore Kumar
  - "Main Tumko Doongi Saiyan Pyar Ki Nishani" with Kishore Kumar
  - "Dekho Mujhe Dekho"
  - "Udti Chidiya Udte Udte"
- Imaan - "Babuji Mujhe Maaf Karo"
- Imtihaan -
  - "Bujha De Jal Gayi"
  - "Dekho Idhar Bhi Jaane Tamanna" with Usha Mangeshkar
- Insaaniyat - "Baat Bhi Kya Karoge Humse Nahin"
- International Crook -
  - "Pyaar Ki Mujhpe Kya Nazar Daali" with Kishore Kumar
  - "Poochha Jo Pyaar Kya Hain" with Kishore Kumar
- Ishk Ishk Ishk -
  - "Bheegi Bheegi Aankhen" with Kishore Kumar
  - "Ishk Ishk Ishk" with Kishore Kumar
  - "Tim Tim Chamka Jhilmil Taara" with Kishore Kumar
  - "Vallah Kya Nazara Hai" with Kishore Kumar, and Poornima
  - "Kisi Na Kisi Se Toh Hogi Mohabbat"
- Jab Andhera Hota Hai -
  - "Zindagi Ka Maza Pyar Se Lijiye Ji"
  - "Jaane Jaan Meri Kasam Tujhko" with Bhupinder Singh
  - "'Hua Yun Pyar Jawan" with Nitin Mukesh
  - "Jab Andhera Hota Hai" with Nitin Mukesh
- Jai Radhekrishna - "Suna Tha Kanhaiya Ke Teri Bansuriya Hai Jadu Bhari"
- Jeevan Rekha -
  - "Loot Gaya Hai Kis Ka Dil"
  - "Jaaneman Jaaneman"
  - "Hawayen Paayal Baja Rahi Hai"
- Jeevan Sangram -
  - "Aaj Ki Aaj Sunaaoon Yaaron Kal Ki Sunna Kal" with Mahendra Kapoor
  - "Main Tere Desh Ki Ladki Tu Mere Desh Ka Ladka" with Usha Mangeshkar
- Jurm Aur Sazaa -
  - "Bhari Mehfil Se Tujhe Na Utha Doon" with Mohammed Rafi
  - "Khoobsurat Tu Sanam, Khoobsurat Main" with Kishore Kumar
- Kasauti -
  - "Yeh Time Time Ki Baat"
  - "Saat Mare Aur Satra Ghayal"
  - "Baby Ho Gayi Hai Jawaan" with Mahendra Kapoor
- Khote Sikkay -
  - "Maar Sutiya, Maar Sutiya"
  - "Pyari Pyari Suratwale" with Usha Mangeshkar
- Khoon Ki Keemat -
  - "Beet Gaye Hain Kitne Zamaane"
  - "Kaun Hai Tu Ye Jaan Liya"
  - "Ari O Champa Chameli"
  - "Hai Kismat Se Ye Mehfil Milti" with Kishore Kumar
- Kora Badan -
- Madhosh -
  - "Sharabi Aankhen, Gulabi Chehra Kaisa Lage Mera" with R D Burman
  - "Sharabi Aankhen, Gulabi Chehra Kaisa Lage Mera (Short)" with R D Burman
  - "Mera Chhota Sa Dil Tune Chheena" with Kishore Kumar
  - "Kasam Khaao Tum Ek Baar, Mere Yaar" with Kishore Kumar
  - "Jaan Mare Balmu Hamaar"
  - "Nathani Meri Dole Re"
- Majboor - "Roothe Rab Ko" with Mohammed Rafi
- Manoranjan -
  - "Aaya Hoon Main Tujhko Le Jaoonga" with Kishore Kumar
  - "Dulhan Maike Chali" with Lata Mangeshkar, and Usha Mangeshkar
  - "Chori Chori Solah Singaar Karungi"
- Manzilein Aur Bhi Hain - "Aaj Naye Geet Saje Meri Paayal Mein"
- Mehmaan -
  - "Chhod Are Jaa" with Mohd Rafi
  - "Tu Dar Maat"
- Mr. Romeo -
  - "Dil Toota Kya Hai Apna" with R D Burman, Kishore Kumar, and Bhupinder Singh
  - "He Mujhe Dil De Nahi To" with R D Burman, Kishore Kumar, and Bhupinder Singh
  - "Yahan Nahi Kahungi To Kahan Kahogi" with Kishore Kumar
  - "Isi Sheher Ki Kisi Gali Me Piya Ka Ghar"
- Naya Din Nai Raat - "Sanam Na Jaao Abhi"
- Nirmaan -
  - "Kasam Khuda Ki, Jo Kuch Kahunga, Sach Sach Kahunga" with Kishore Kumar
  - "Tauba Tera Husn-E-Jawan Aafat Hai Jaan-E-Jaan" with Shailendra Singh
- Paise Ki Gudiya - "Pagal Pagal Hum Sab Pagal"
- Patthar Aur Payal -
  - "Kaun Hu Mai Tu Kya Jaane"
  - "Na Mila Tu Nazar Na Mila Tu Nazar"
- Pran Jaye Per Vachan Na Jaye -
  - "Aa Ke Dard Jawan Hai"
  - "Bikaner Ki Chunri Odhi"
  - "Chain Se Humko Kabhi"
  - "Dekho Raja Dekho"
  - "Dekho Arey Dilbar"
  - "Ek Tu Hai Piya"
- Prem Nagar -
  - "Pyase Do Badan Pyaasi Raat Mein"
  - "Thandi Hawaon Ne Gori Ka Ghunghat Utha Diya" with Kishore Kumar
- Pocket Maar -
  - "Dushmani Hai Yeh To Pyaar Nahi"
  - "Uyi Kya Ho Gaya" with Manna Dey
- Prem Shastra -
  - "Mujhe Pyaar Kar" with Kishore Kumar
  - "Naam Hamara Mashur Ho Gaya" with Kishore Kumar
  - "Tip Tip Tip"
  - "Main Hu Dekhne Ki Cheez"
- Pugli - "Dhak Dhak Dhadke Kya Karoon Re Dil"
- Raja Kaka -
  - "Jee Chahta Hai Utha Le Jaoon (version 1)" with Kishore Kumar
  - "Jee Chahta Hai Utha Le Jaoon (version 2)" with Kishore Kumar
- Resham Ki Dori -
  - "Zohra Jamal Hoon"
  - "Sona Hai Chandi Hai"
- Sagina - "Ghazab Chamkegi Bindiya Tori Adhi Raat" with Kishore Kumar
- Sauda -
  - "Jhoothe Jhoothi Teri Prem Kahani"
  - "Duniya Bhookhi Hai Paise Ki" with Mukesh
- Shaitaan -
  - "Meri Aankh Phadakti Hai"
  - "Woh Jo Kal Gaye The"
  - "Dil To Maane Na, Meri Jaan" with R D Burman
- Shaandaar -
  - "Itni Badi Duniya Mein" with Kishore Kumar
  - "Jhumka Bola Kajra Se"
- Shatranj Ke Mohre -
  - "Haye Ri Mori Dhani Chunar Udi Udi Jaye"
  - "Log To Loote Hai Andhere Mein"
- Shikwa - "Tu Jhoom Le Sharaabi"
- Shubh Din -
  - "Bhar Bhar Ke Pee Le Jaam"
- Trimurti -
  - "Ab Rahoge Tum Apne Hi Bas Mein"
  - "Daulat Ke Rang Hazar Hain" with Manna Dey
- Ujala Hi Ujala -
  - "Maine Toh Ye Jaana, Tu Hain Toh Zamana" with Kishore Kumar
  - "Aaj Kahi Raja Chalo Mere Sang" with Mohammed Rafi
  - "Aye Mere Dil Bhool Jaa Bhool Jaa"
  - "Dil Ka Churana Ya Maal Churana Bolo Buri Baat Hai"
- Us-Paar - "Pyaara Hindola Mera, Udaan Khatola Mera"
- Woh Main Nahin -
  - "Mera Roop Mera Rang Mere Chalne Ka Dhang" with Mohammed Rafi
  - "Honthon Se Kayi Lutaye Taraane" with Kishore Kumar
  - "Cheecho Cheech Ganeria, Do Teria Do Meria"
  - "Tujhe Ladki Mile Jawaan" with Naveen Nischol
- Zehreela Insaan -
  - "Mere Dil Se Yeh Nain" with Shailendra Singh
  - "Yeh Silsila, Pyaar Se Chala"

=== 1975 ===
- Aa Jaa Sanam -
  - "Ae Mere Chanchal Chanda So Jaa Chain Se" with Usha Timothy
  - "Aaj Ki Raat Mere Waaste Kya Layi Hai"
  - "Aaja, Khadi Hoon Teri Raahon Mein"
- Aakhri Dao -
  - "O Allah Meri Khair Ho" with Mohammed Rafi
  - "Tum Sang Preet Lagai"
- Aakraman - "Punjabi Gaayenge Marathi Gaayenge" with Mahendra Kapoor
- Amanush -
  - "Kal Ke Apne Na Jaane Kyun" with Kishore Kumar
  - "Tere Gaalonko Choomoon" with Kishore Kumar
  - "Ghum Ki Dawaa To Pyaar Hai"
- Anari - "Hame Kya Garz Log Kya Maante Hai" with Kishore Kumar
- Andhera -
  - "Kuchh Toh Samjho Aati Hai Kisliye Jawani"
  - "Husn Aur Sharab Ka Jo Rishta Hai"
- Andolan - "Piya Ko Milan Kaise Hiye Ri Main Jaanu Nahi"
- Angaare -
  - "Tang Main Aa Gayaa Hun Javaani Se" with Kishore Kumar
  - "Ladki Gali Ki Le Gayi Dekho Mera Dil" with Mohammed Rafi
- Awara Ladki - "Raat Main Akeli Thi"
- Balak Aur Janwar -
  - "Aaja Sanam Chhod Sharam"
- Badnaam -
  - "Sheeshe Ki Jawani"
  - "Pehra Hai Yahaan"
  - "Bhaiya Phool Main"
- Biwi Kiraye Ki -
  - "Tamannayen Pareshan" with Mukesh
  - "Dil Tera Hai, Yeh Zindagi Teri"
- Chori Mera Kaam -
  - "Chori Mera Kaam Yaaron" with Kishore Kumar
  - "Kaahe Ko, Kaahe Ko Mere Peechhe Padi Hai" with Kishore Kumar
- Dafaa 302 -
  - "Kya Lenge Aap Kuch To Lena Padega"
  - "Himmatwala Meri Doli Le Jayega"
- Dayar-e-Madina -
  - "Gulon Ka Rang Jo Nikhra" with Mohammed Rafi
  - "Ya Nabi Lije Khabar"
  - "Madad Kijiye Tajedar-E-Madina (female)"
  - "Manzil Talash Karte Hai"
  - "Hum Hawa Me Bhi Chirag Apna"
  - "Madad Kijiye Tajdar Madeena (version 2)"
- Deewaar -
  - "Keh Doon Tumhe" with Kishore Kumar
  - "Maine Tujhe Maanga, Tujhe Paya Hai" with Kishore Kumar
  - "Koi Mar Jaye Kisi Pe" with Usha Mangeshkar
- Dharam Karam - "Tere Humsafar Geet Hain Tere" with Kishore Kumar, and Mukesh
- Do Jasoos -
  - "Allah Meri Tauba"
- Do Thug -
  - "Humne Karjke Mohabbat" with Kishore Kumar
  - "Lo Aaj Maine Chehre Se" with Usha Timothy
  - "O Thandi Thandi Rut"
  - "Ye Duniya To Hai Bas Paise Ki"
- Ek Gaon Ki Kahani -
  - "Kesar Jaise Tu Kishori"
  - "Tuhi Bata Tujhe Pane Ka Kaun Sa Hai Tarika"
  - "Banno Pyari Banno" with Usha Mangeshkar
- Ek Hanson Ka Joda -
  - "Pyaar Se Tum Mile Mil Gayi Har Khushi" with Kishore Kumar
  - "Aa Jao Ki Mil Kar Badle Duniya"
  - "Mere Dil Me Teri Tasvir"
- Faraar -
  - "Hamara Yeh Dil Jaani" with Usha Mangeshkar
  - "Hamara Yeh Dil Jaani (version 2)" with Usha Mangeshkar
- Ganga Ki Kasam -
  - "O Mere Dil Jaani" with Kishore Kumar, and Minoo Purushottam
  - "Aam Le Lo Aam" with Kishore Kumar, and Minoo Purushottam
  - "Maa Kahega Mujhko" with Kishore Kumar, and Minoo Purushottam
  - "Pyaar Ka Tu Lekar Naam" with Kishore Kumar, and Minoo Purushottam
- Geet Gaata Chal - "Shyam Abhimani" with Mohammed Rafi
- Jaggu -
  - "Mera Naam Ka Chala Hai Yeh Jaam"
  - "Chanda Kiran Pyasi Hai"
  - "Kasme Dekhi Vaade Dekhe"
- Jogi Aur Jawaani - "Dariya-e-Dil Mein"
- Julie -
  - "Sancha Naam Tera" with Usha Mangeshkar
- Kaala Sona -
  - "Sun Sun Kasam Se, Laagun Tere Kadam Se" with Danny Denzongpa
  - "Tak Jhoom Naacho Nashe Mein Chur" with Kishore Kumar
  - "Ek Baar Jaan-E-Jaana"
  - "Koi Aaya, Aane Bhi De"
- Kaam Shastra -
  - "Khiche Khiche Se Kyo Ho Raat Ja Rahi Hai"
  - "Jawani Ki Ye Rate Yu Hi Na Dhal Jaye"
  - "Utha Ke Neechi Nazar Maine Jab Salaam Kiya"
- Kaagaz Ki Nao -
  - "Har Janam Me Hamara Milan" with Manhar Udhas
  - "Main Tumhare Khayalon Mein"
  - "Na Jaiyo Re Sautan Ghar Saiyan"
- Kahte Hain Mujhko Raaja - "Aiyo Re, Gaya Kaam Se" with Kishore Kumar
- Khel Khel Mein -
  - "Ahe Lo Pyaar Ke Din Aaye" with Kishore Kumar
  - "Khullam Khulla Pyaar Karenge" with Kishore Kumar
  - "Ek Main Aur Ek Tu" with Kishore Kumar
  - "Sapna Nera Toot Gaya" with R D Burman
- Khooni Kaun -
  - "Aa Lag Ja Gale"
  - "Aaja Re Bichde"
  - "Yeh Bata"
- Khushboo -
  - "Bechara Dil Kya Kare"
  - "Ghar Jaayegi Tar Jaayegi"
- Lafange -
  - "Ib Lagan Lagi Lagan Lagi" with Mohammed Rafi
  - "Aai Kisi Ki Yaad To" with Manna Dey
- Love In Bombay -
  - "Saiyan Saiyan Haye Saiyan"
  - "Na Main Boli, Na Woh Bola"
- Mausam - "Mere Ishq Mein"
- Maya Machhindra -
  - "Phagun Ka Mahina Aayo Sakhi" with Usha Mangeshkar
  - "Chhalak Rahi Boonde"
- Mazaaq - "Takra Gaye Do Baadal"
- Mere Sajna -
  - "Tumhari Aankh Se Joda Hai"
- Mounto -
  - "Mere Husn Ke Jalwe Beshumaar"
  - "Main Shamma Kahan Hai Parwana"
  - "Teri Toh Buddhi Pe Pad Gaya Taala"
  - "Door Door Se Aayi Hoon Main Toh Milne Ko" with Mahendra Kapoor, and Amit Kumar
- Mutthi Bhar Chawal -
  - "Saari Ratiyan Machaave Utpaat"
  - "Humein Hukum Tha Gham Uthana Padega"
- Naatak -
  - "Mera Rang Roop Mere Baal"
  - "Zindagi Ek Natak Hai (part 1)"
  - "Zindagi Ek Natak Hai (part 2)"
- Neelima - "Tu Jo Kahe Ban Jaoongi Main Wahi"
- Phanda -
  - "Tu Jo Le Le Nigaho Se Mera Salaam"
  - "Zindagi Ki Pehli Zaroorat Hai"
  - "Yeh Haseen Parchhayia" with Usha Mangeshkar
- Ponga Pandit - "Jijaji Jijaji, Mere Didi Hai Anadi" with Kishore Kumar, and Usha Mangeshkar
- Qaid -
  - "Beliya Aale Beliya" with Nitin Mukesh
- Raaja -
  - "Mere Roothe Balam Se Kehdo"
  - "Kaun Hoon Main, Kaun Hai Tu" with Kishore Kumar
- Rafoo Chakkar -
  - "Kisi Pe Dil Agar Aa Jaye To" with Shailendra Singh
  - "Chhuk Chhuk Chak Chak Bombay Se Baroda" with Mahesh Kumar, and Usha Mangeshkar
- Raftaar -
  - "Sansaar Hai Ik Nadiya" with Mukesh
  - "Nari Jeevan Bhi Kya Jeevan Hai"
  - "Yeh Kaisi Lagi Agan Jale Badan"
  - "Loota Hai Tune Mujhe"
  - "Ye Sun Haaniya Oye Dil Janiya" with Mohammed Rafi
- Ranga Khush -
  - "Uparwala Tera Is Dharti Mein" with Omi, Joginder, and Minoo Purushottam
  - "Gud Gud Bole" with Omi, Joginder, and Minoo Purushottam
  - "Chhedega Mujhko To Katungi Tujhko" with Omi, Joginder, and Minoo Purushottam
  - "Nanhi Nanhi Palke Tori" with Omi, Joginder, and Minoo Purushottam
  - "Chhutti Kar Doongi" with Omi, Joginder, and Minoo Purushottam
  - "Ban Ke Pawan Ud Jaungi Main"
- Rangeen Duniya -
  - "Chaayi Mast Bahare" with Manna Dey
  - "Pehli Jhalak Mein" with Manna Dey
  - "Rang Ye Dekh" with Manna Dey
  - "Tan Ye Sone Ka Shabnami" with Mahendra Kapoor
  - "Naina Mila Lo Khul Ke Tum" with Mahendra Kapoor
- Rani Aur Lalpari -
  - "Rani Ki Jo Na Maani Tune Baat" with Dilraj Kaur
  - "Kirnon Se Jagmagaye, Khushboo Se Phail Jaaye" with Dilraj Kaur
  - "Maa Ke Aansu Maa Ke Mamta"
  - "Mera Phool Badan Kumhlaaye Re"
  - "Ek Baar Ek Ladki Thi, Naam Tha Jiska Cindrela" with Manna Dey, Dilraj Kaur, Pramila Datar, and Faiyaz
- Saazish -
  - "Na Takht Chaahiye Na Taaj Chaahiye"
  - "Na Takht Chhaahiye (version 2)"
  - "How Sweet Daadaaji Aise Na" with Ranu Mukhrjee
- Sewak -
  - "Banke Sanwarke Main"
  - "Kahoon To Kahoon Kaise"
  - "Gin Ginke Badle Lena Hai, Bachke Na Jane Dena Hai" with Minoo Purushottam
- Shri Ram Hanuman Yudha - "Shri Raghupati Shri Raam Naam Hai"
- Shri Satya Narayan Ki Pooja -
  - "Kya Bhool Hui, Kyun Rooth Gaye"
- Sunehra Sansar - "Hello Hello, Kya Haal Hai" with Kishore Kumar
- Toofan -
  - "Baaj Jaayega Baja" with Mohammed Rafi
  - "Chalo Koi Khel Khele Hum" with Mohammed Rafi
  - "Pyaar Kar Dhaar Kar" with Mohammed Rafi
  - "O Barkha Mujhe Sach Sach Bata" with Mohammed Rafi
  - "Reshma Mera Naam Hai"
  - "Sacche Ka Bolbala" with Mahendra Kapoor
- Uljhan - "Mujhko Toh Qaatil Ki Itni Pehchan Hai" with Mohammed Rafi, and Sudesh Kumar
- Umar Qaid -
  - "Phinjauda Bhk Bhai, Apni Baat Zara Maan" with Minoo Purushottam, and Mohammed Rafi
  - "Aag Me Jale Jawaani"
  - "Yun Naa Dekh Mujhe"
- Vandana - "Ae Sichta Hai Kya, Aaja!"
- Zakhmee -
  - "Jalta Hai Jiya Mera" with Kishore Kumar
- Zameer - "Tum Bhi Chalo, Hum Bhi Chale" with Kishore Kumar
- Zindagi Aur Toofan -
  - "Raat Madhosh Hai"
  - "Meri Kashti Toofan Mein"
  - "Main Bhi To Akela Hoon" with Amit Kumar
- Zorro -
  - "Dilwalon Se Pyar Kar Lo, Pyar Ke Naam Ka Jaam Bhar Lo" with Mohammed Rafi, and Usha Timothy
  - "Kya Cheez Hai Aurat Duniya Mein" with Kishore Kumar
  - "Haay Re Tauba, Mujhe Kya Hua"
  - "Dil Tere Naam Kar Doongi"
  - "Haay Haay Main Mar Gayi"

=== 1976 ===
- Aaj Ka Mahaatma - "Chandni Cahnd Se Hoti Hai" with Kishore Kumar
- Alibaba -
  - "Hamre Ishq Ka Itna To Ehtraam Karo" with Aziz Nazan
  - "Ae Khuda Gham Se Chhuda Hum"
  - "Husn Na Jaane Sar Ko Jhukana"
  - "Shabnam Meri Mohabbat"
- Bairaag -
  - "Saare Shehar Mein Aap Sa" with Mohammed Rafi
  - "Peete Peete Kabhi Kabhi Yun" with Mohammed Rafi
- Bajrangbali -
  - "He Maryada Purushottam Bolo" with Lata Mangeshkar
  - "Hamara Naam Hai Ram Katori"
- Balika Badhu - "O Jhunkewale" with Kishore Kumar
- Barood -
  - "I Love You"
- Bhagwan Samaye Sansar Mein - "O Bairagi Ban Anuragi"
- Bhanwar -
  - "Aankhe Milayenge Bate Sunayenge" with Kishore Kumar
  - "Rang Le Aayenge, Roop Le Aayenge" with Kishore Kumar
  - "Baraat Mein Log Kam Kyun Aaye Hai" with R D Burman, and Kishore Kumar
- Bhoola Bhatka -
  - "Chali Chilman Ke Peechhe" with Aziz Nazan
  - "Kahin Se Koi Raasta Mil Gaya"
- Bullet -
  - "Ae Chori Chori Chupke Chupke" with Kishore Kumar
  - "Peene Ke Baad Aati Hai Yaad"
- Bundal Baaz - "Kya Hua Yaaron" with Kishore Kumar
- Charas -
  - "Mera Naam Ballerina"
  - "Charas Charas" with Mahendra Kapoor
- Chhoti Si Baat - "Jaaneman Jaaneman Tere Do Nayan" with K. J. Yesudas
- Deewaangee -
  - "Woh Bhi Mujhse Karne Laga Hai Zara Zara Sa Pyaar"
  - "Meei Jawani Kare Ishare"
- Dus Numbri - "Dilruba Dilliwali" with Mukesh, and Manna Dey
- Ek Se Badhkar Ek -
  - "Zara Bach Ke" with Mohammed Rafi
  - "Masti Jo Teri Ankhon Mein Hai" with Mohammed Rafi
  - "Main Toh Chhuriyon Ki Dhar Pe" with Mohammed Rafi
- Fakira - "Yeh Mera Jaadu, Zor Hoke Kabu"
- Fauji -
  - "Vardi Hai Bhagwan" with Mohammed Rafi, Manna Dey, and Minoo Purushottam
  - "Garmi Lagi Hai" with Minoo Purushottam
  - "Phataphat Jaam Pila De" with Manna Dey, Narendra Chanchal, Kumar Sonik, and Minoo Purushottam
- Gumrah -
  - "Pyaase Hoth Chalakte Saagar"
  - "Tere Chehre Se Chilman Hata Dun"
- Harfan Maula -
  - "Dori Pyaar Ki Na Toote" with Mohammed Rafi
  - "Main Hu Hansi Tumne Kaha" with Mohammed Rafi
  - "Sab Ke Lab Par Naam Hamara" with Mohammed Rafi
  - "Dilwale Karte Hai Ghulami" with Mohammed Rafi
  - "Jaye Naa Paiyo"
- Hera Pheri -
  - "Aap Ka Sarkar Kya Kuchh Kho Gaya Hai"
  - "Mujhe Pyaar Mein Khat Kisine Likha Hai"
- Jai Mahalaxmi Maa - "Baanki Ada Se Bach Payega"
- Jeevan Jyoti -
  - "Yeh Ghunghroo"
  - "Suno Sunate Hai Tumko Ek Dukhbhari Kahani" with Usha Mangeshkar
- Kabeela - "Teri Meri Ho Gayi Yaari"
- Kadambari -
  - "Ambar Ki Ek Paak Suraahi"
- Kalicharan -
  - "Tum Jaano Ya Hum Jaane" with Mohammed Rafi
  - "Yeh Pal Chanchal Kho Na Dena O Deewane" with Kishore Kumar
- Kasam -
  - "Aa Paas Aa Darr Tujhko Kya"
  - "Hai Mai Mari Hui Mai Mari"
- Khalifa -
  - "Dil Machal Raha Hai" with Kishore Kumar
  - "Dekh Tujhko Dil Ne Kaha" with Kishore Kumar
- Kitne Paas Kitne Door - "Nazron Se Nazren Mila Zara"
- Koi Jeeta Loo Haara -
  - "Aaj Hum Tum Dono Chup Rahenge" with Kishore Kumar
  - "Ban Gayi Baat Baaton Mein" with Kishore Kumar
- Ladki Bholi Bhali -
  - "Ji Maine Nahi Pi Hai"
  - "Main Hu Kya Bataye"
  - "Roshni Bujha Dil Ko Tu Jala"
- Lagaam - "Aa Idhar Aa Zara Nazar To Mila"
- Maha Chor -
  - "Mithi Mithi Ankhiyon Se Man Bhar De" with Kishore Kumar
  - "Sun Banto Baat Mero" with Anand Bakshi
- Main Chor Hoon -
  - "Neela Akash Ho" with Mahendra Kapoor
  - "Govind Ho Govinda" with Mahendra Kapoor
  - "Radha Ye Dil To Hai Tere Bus Mein" with Mahendra Kapoor
  - "Babu Tu Muskura"
- Mazdoor Zindabad -
  - "Yeh Aaj Ka Bharat Hai" with Jaspal Singh
  - "Humko Paisa Na Do, Hum Bikhari Nahi" with Anupama Deshpande
- Meera Shyam -
  - "Itni Binti Suno Meri"
  - "Ankhiyan Shyam Milan Ki Pyasi"
- Mere Sartaj -
  - "Mera Sab Kuch Hai Ae Dilruba Tumhare Liye"
  - "Main Hu Dukhtare Angoor"
  - "Jali Hai Shama Karwan Ko Lutne Ke Liye"
- Mrig Trishna - "Saajan Saajan Main Karun"
- Naag Champa -
  - "Been Baja Mere Mast Sapere"
  - "O Matwaale Pyaale Par Kyo Bana Deewana Hai"
  - "Meri Dard Bhari Ye Pukaar Hai"
  - "Naag Panchami Ka Aaya Hai Yeh Mangal Tyohaar"
  - "Raat Gayi Prabhaat Hua Chamka Suraj" with Manna Dey
- Nagin - "Tere Ishq Ka Mujhpe" with Mohammed Rafi
- Nehle Pe Dehla -
  - "Main Choron Ki Rani Hoon"
- Play Boy - "Ek Pagle Se Pad Gaya Pala"
- Rakhi Aur Rifle -
  - "Kabhi Kabhi Saiyya Sharab Pike Aaye"
  - "Tum Pyare Ho Balam Mohe Praan Se"
  - "Ye Rakhi Bhi Pyari Hai"
- Raees -
  - "Tere Zurm Ki Maut Hai Saza"
  - "Mauka Yeh Kho Na Dena Ae Dil"
- Raeeszada - "Jiska Man Hi Prem Ka Darpan" with Mohammed Rafi
- Rangila Ratan -
  - "Tera Mera Mera Tera" with Kishore Kumar
- Sajjo Rani -
  - "Saiyyan Ke Gaon Mein Taaro Ki Chhaav Mein"
  - "Jiya Mane Nahi Khadi Taako Saiyya"
  - "Paao Mein Payal"
  - "Mori Bali Umariya Kharab Kini Balma"
- Salaakhen -
  - "Maze Uda Lo Jawani Rahe Na Rahe"
  - "Mere Dekh Ke Lambe Baal"
  - "Seema Seema Seema" with Kishore Kumar
- Sankoch[56][57] - "Pyare Pyare Ghungat Mein"
- Shahi Lutera -
  - "Dil Se Dil Takra Lo" with Mohammed Rafi, and Omi
  - "Garr Ishq Me Aisa Haal Hai" with Manna Dey
  - "Husn Hai Parda Daar Hoshiyar Khabardaar" with Omi
  - "Tikhi Tikhi Naro Ke Teer Chalaye"
- Shankar Dada -
  - "Ek Main Ek Tu" with Mohammed Rafi
  - "Tune Jalwe Nahi Dekhe Jalal Nahi Dekha" with Manna Dey
  - "Hay Hay Mar Jaava"
- Shankar Shambhu -
  - "Agar Nibhane Ki Himmat"
  - "Bheege Hue Jalwon Par Aise Na Nazar Dalo" with Mohammed Rafi
- Sharafat Chhod Di Maine -
  - "Shyam Salona (version 1)"
  - "Shyam Salona (version 2)"
  - "Ek Mutthi Mein Dil"
  - "Meri Gali Mein Saiyan"
  - "Aaj Ki Mehfil, Aaj Ki Saham"
  - "Ek Sapna Maine Dekha Hai, Ek Sapna Maine Dekha Hai" with Mohammed Rafi
- Sikka -
  - "Aa Gayi Ab To Samajh Me Ye Haqiqat Pyare" with Mohammed Rafi
  - "Dil Hai Mera Shishe Jaisa Dheere Se Lijiye"
  - "Balma Buddhu Anandi, Main Kaise Karun Pyar"
  - "Hath Yu Na Chuddao"
- Suntan -
  - "Pappu Ki Mummy, Tu Badi Nikammi, Teri Jaan Ko" with Kishore Kumar
  - "Aaj Khushi Se Jhum Raha (version 1)"
  - "Aaj Khushi Se Jhum Raha (version 2)"
  - "Laaton Ke Bhoot Baaton Se"
  - "Jawani Ke Din Chaar"
- Toofan Aur Bijlee -
  - "Yeh Dil Tera Hi Tha" with Mahendra Kapoor, and Ranu Mukherjee
  - "Galyaat Saankli Sonyachi Hi Pori Konachi" with Mahendra Kapoor
  - "Zulfi Main Tere Pyar Mein Diwani Ho Gayi"
  - "Main Hoon Toofan, Main Hoon Bijli"
- Udhar Ka Sindur -
  - "Jannat Se Aayi Pari" with Mukesh
  - "Lejiye Vo Aagaye Nashe Ki Sham"
  - "Pyar Mangda Ikraar Mangda"
- Yaari Zindabad -
  - "Husn Bole Ishq Se Deedar Kar Ke Dekh Le" with Usha Mangeshkar
  - "Panwa Khaike"
  - "Ari Kya Hua Bolta Kyun Nahin" with Kamal Barot
- Zid -
  - "Tere Liye Maine Thami Re Mala" with Jaspal Singh
  - "Holi Hai Ho Ho La La La" with Jaspal Singh
  - "Jab Talak Dum Mein Dum"

=== 1977 ===
- Adha Din Aadhi Raat -
  - "Saathi Banega, Saath Apne Chalega" with Mohammed Rafi
  - "Ek Baar, Sirf Ek Baar Tu Jo Muskura De"
  - "Kaahe Ko Byaahi Videsh Re Baabul"
- Aadmi Sadak Ka - "Basti Basti Nagri Nagri" with Mohammed Rafi
- Aaina -
  - "Kaho Toh Aaj Bol Doon"
- Aakhri Goli -
  - "Kaise Keh Doon Mujhe"
  - "Ek Baat Batane Aayi Hoon"
- Ab Kya Hoga -
  - "Sare Mahafil Mera Iman Beiman Ho Gaya" with Mohammed Rafi
  - "Sone Se Jeevan Ke"
  - "Aa Devta Tu Apni Pujarin Ke Pas"
  - "Main Rat Bhar Na Soyi Re"
  - "Teri Dulhun Hun Tere Nakhre Uthaungi"
- Abhi Toh Jee Lein -
  - "Kabhi Toh ChaliAa Aashiqon Ki Gali" with Kishore Kumar
  - "Tu Laali Hai Savere Wali" with Kishore Kumar
- Adalat - "Tumse Door Reh Ke" with Mohammed Rafi
- Agar -
  - "Aa Lag Ja Gale Mere Lehrake" with Mohammed Rafi
  - "Jiwan Path Ke Ek Rath Ke Do Pahiye" with K. J. Yesudas
  - "Mammi Mujhe Gudiya Si Behnaa Chahiye" with Sushma Shrestha, Amol Palekar, and Master Raju
- Agent Vinod -
  - "Band Kamare Mein Ek Ladaki Akeli"
  - "Loveleena Aa Gaya Mai, Tu Aa Gaya Toh Jaanejaa Baaho Me Tham Le" with Shailendra Singh
  - "Mehfil Me Aaye Ho Aapka Dil Jaan Jaaynge" with Manna Dey
- Alibaba Marjina -
  - "Gulbadan Aa Gayi, Lo Aa Gayi"
  - "Basre Ki Hoor Dekho Aayi"
  - "Gulistan Se Nikalkar Gulaab Aa Gaya"
  - "Main Hoon Kafir Mast Hasina" with Anuradha Paudwal
- Amaanat -
  - "Cycle Pe Haseenon Ki Toli" with Mohammed Rafi, and Manna Dey
  - "Bujhe Bujhe Rang Hai"
- Amar shilpi -
  - "Dekho To Aaya Nahi Kanha Mera" with Manna Dey, and Usha Mangeshkar
  - "Hai Vahi Hai Vahi Rani Meri Karti Hai" with Manna Dey, and Usha Mangeshkar
  - "Man Ke Phulwa Khile" with Manna Dey, and Usha Mangeshkar
  - "Pathoro Me Rehne Wale" with Manna Dey, and Usha Mangeshkar
  - "Pyaar Kar Le Mujhse" with Manna Dey, and Usha Mangeshkar
  - "Shri Venu Gopala Chinmayanand" with Manna Dey, and Usha Mangeshkar
  - "Suno To Zarra Ae" with Manna Dey, and Usha Mangeshkar
- Anand Ashram - "Saara Pyaar Tumhara" with Kishore Kumar
- Apnapan -
  - "Dil Pe Zara Haath Rakh Lo"
- Bahadur Bachche -
  - "Dil Lut Ke Mera Pyaar Se" with Nitin Mukesh
  - "Hey Pintu, Hey Hey Chintu" with Usha Mangeshkar, and Mahendra Kapoor
- Bolo He Chakradhari -
  - "Bolo He Chakradhari"
  - "Jai Purushottam"
  - "O Shehar Ke Banke Babu"
  - "Jai Bolo Kanhaiya Laal Mere" with Mahendra Kapoor
  - "O Re O Re O Kanhaai" with Usha Mangeshkar
- Chacha Batija - "Hey La La Jhumo Zara Jhumo Nacho Jara" with Shailendra Singh, and Mohammed Rafi
- Chakkar Pe Chakkar -
  - "Kahan Kahan Kis Kis Din" with Kishore Kumar
- Chala Murari Heri Banne -
  - "Khoye Ho Aakhir Kis Bekhudi Mein"
  - "Do Pal Ki Hey Ye Zindagani"
  - "Pas Aao Na" with Simi Garewal
- Chalu Mera Naam -
  - "Ruk Ruk Meri Raani" with Mohammed Rafi
  - "Is Rangbhari Mehfil Se Ek Cheez Churane Aaye Hai" with Kishore Kumar
  - "Kahi Jo Baat Bado Ne Pehle"
- Chalta Purza - "Yeh Raat Ne Rang Jamaya Hai"
- Chandi Sona -
  - "Uljhan Hajar Koi Dale" with Manna Dey, and Kishore Kumar
  - "Socha Tha Maine To Ae Jaan" with Kishore Kumar
  - "Aap Sa Koi Hasin" with Kishore Kumar
- Charandas -
  - "Kuchh Soch Ke Pyaar Kiya Hai" with Mohammed Rafi
  - "Yeh Zanana Agar Raah Roke" with Kishore Kumar
  - "Dil Ki Lagi Aisi Lagi"
- Chhaila Babu -
  - "Yaar Dildaar Tujhe Kaisa Chahiye" with Kishore Kumar
  - "Kal Raat Sadak Pe Ek Ladki" with Kishore Kumar
  - "Humko Nikaloge Ghar Se Saajan" with Kishore Kumar
- Chhota Baap -
  - "Tutegi Kalai Phir Hogi Na Sagai"
  - "Jab Bhi Dekhu Tu Kanha Ke"
  - "Mehendi Raccha Bindiya Saja"
- Chor Sipahee -
  - "Ek Taraf Hai Ye Zamana" with Bhupinder Singh, Manna Dey, and Mohammed Rafi
  - "Dekha Sahab O Sahab Kahna Aasana"
- Darinda - "Ladki Kaahe Ki Bani" with Kishore Kumar
- Daku Aur Mahatma -
  - "Angoothi Angoothi"
  - "Suno Suno Re Mera Sandesh"
  - "Kajarwa Ne Maare Kayi Naujawan"
  - "Jaat Na Poochho Saddu Ki" with Mohammed Rafi
- Darling Darling -
  - "Ek Main Hun Aur Ek Tu Aur Kya Chahiye" with Kishore Kumar
  - "Raat Gayi Baat Gayi" with Kishore Kumar
  - "Hello Darling, Kisi Naye Shahar Ka Naam Le Babu" with Kishore Kumar
- Dharam Veer - "Bandh Ho Mutthi Toh Laakh Ki" with Lata Mangeshkar
- Dhoop Chhaon -
  - "Nazren Churake Baithi, Daaman Bachake Baithi"
  - "Jal Jaana Phighal Jaana"
- Dil Aur Patthar -
  - "Are Chipku Chuna Na Na"
  - "Aayega Aa Ha Aayega Koi Aayega"
  - "Allah Na Jaanu Raam Na Jaanu"
  - "Oh Zulmi Tori Motor Car"
  - "Hun Ha Hu Hai Yahi To Zameen Aasmaan" with Manna Dey
- Dildaar -
  - "Hum Jaise Jo Dildaar Hote Hain" with Kishore Kumar
  - "Gaon Mein Hote Haste Rote" with Kishore Kumar
  - "Dekhna Kaise Dara Diya" with Kishore Kumar
  - "Main Raja Tu Rani" with Kishore Kumar
- Dimple - "Nadaan Hoon, Sharmili Hoon" with Vijay Singh
- Do Chehre -
  - "Chali Thi Thumka De Ke Thaske" with Minoo Purushottam
  - "Mai To Sapne Sanwar Kar Baithi"
  - "Iss Raat Ke Sannate Mein"
- Do Sholay - "Yeh Bairi Mujhe Kala Mil Gaya"
- Dream Girl -
  - "Duniya Ke Log"
- Duniyadari - "Teen Baaje Bola Tha, Baaj Gaye Chaat" with Amit Kumar
- Ek Hi Raasta -
  - "Dil Ko Mila Lo, Dil Ko Takra Lo" with Amit Kumar
  - "Itni Jaldi Kahan Jaate Ho" with Kishore Kumar
- Farishta Ya Qatil - "Kahin Dekha Na Dekha Aisa Shabaab" with Mohammed Rafi
- Gayatri Mahima -
  - "Deepak Hai Tu Piya" with Mohammed Rafi
- Gyani Ji - "Ek Pyaar Se Yaara Dekho Badal Jaaye Zindagani" with Mohammed Rafi, Pascal Paul, and Jaspal Singh
- Haiwan -
  - "Pagal Pagal Hai Yeh Mausam" with Hemant Kumar
- Hatyara - "Mere Noor Ke Charche Door Door"
- Hira Aur Patthar -
  - "Na Jaao Saiyan Riske"
- Hum Kisise Kum Naheen -
  - "Humko Toh Yaara Teri Yaari" with Kishore Kumar
  - "Mil Gaya Humko Teri Yaari" with Kishore Kumar
  - "Hai Agar Dushman" with Mohammad Rafi
  - "Yeh Ladka Haye Allah" with Mohammad Rafi
- Imman Dharam - "Kuncham Kuncham" with Mukesh, and Mahendra Kapoor
- Inkaar -
  - "Chhodo Yeh Nigaahon Ka Ishaara" with Kishore Kumar
- Jadu Tona -
  - "Har Sannata Kuchh Kehta Hai" with K. J. Yesudas
  - "Sawari Saloni Jamna Ka Jeewan" with K. J. Yesudas, and Shivangi Kolhapure
  - "Sevak Shri Ram Ke" with Brij Bhishan, and Hemant Kumar
- Jagriti -
  - "Meharbaan Kaise Kaise Kadardan"
  - "One Two Three Four Ae Hero" with Dilraj Kaur, Meenu Purushottam, and Suman Kalyanpur
- Jai Dwarkadheesh - "Kaise Kaise Umar Aayi"
- Jay Vejay -
  - "Sone Jaisi Tumhari Jawani" with Bhupinder Singh, and Usha Mangeshkar
- Jeevan Mukt -
  - "Humne Kabhi Eocha Nahin"
  - "Lehra Ke Dagar, Chali Jaati Hai Kidhar"
  - "He Shyam Kahu Kaise"
  - "Aao Wahi Ham Chale"
- Kachcha Chor -
  - "Kabhi Gareebo Se Pyaar Kar Le" with Kishore Kumar
  - "Pehle Hum Muskuraye Phir Woh Mushkuraye"
  - "Dil Ki Chori Jaanu Na" with Mahendra Kapoor
  - "Dhola Dhola Dhola Sautan Sang Na Jaye" with Usha Mangeshkar
- Kalabaaz - "Are Humse Jo Takrayega" with Kishore Kumar
- Kali Raat -
  - "Arre Mera Naam Chalta Raam" with Kishore Kumar
- Karm -
  - "Samay Tu Dheere Dheere Chal" with Kishore Kumar
  - "Samay Tu Jaldi Jaldi Chal" with Kishore Kumar
  - "Maine Dekha Tujhe" with Kishore Kumar
  - "Jab Charon Taraf Andhera Ho" with Mahendra Kapoor
- Khel Khilari Ka -
  - "Jaan Ab Ja Rahi Hai" with Manna Dey
  - "Pyar Bada Hai Ya Jaan Badi Hai" with Lata Mangeshkar
  - "Sabak Pada Hai Jab Se" with Kishore Kumar, Manna Dey, and Kanchan
- Khel Kismat Ka -
- Khoon Pasina - "Raja Dil Maange Chavanni Uchhalke"
- Kotwal Saab -
  - "Hamara Balma Beimaan"
  - "Saathi Re Bhool Na Jaana"
- Ladki Jawab Ho Gai -
  - "Ek Paheli Tum Se Punchu" with Kishore Kumar
  - "Ek To Vaisi Hi Deewani"
  - "Jawani Hoti Hai Sau Aftaab Ka Jaadu" with Mahendra Kapoor
- Maha Badmaash -
  - "Nazar Zara Badli Badli Si" with Mohammed Rafi
  - "Abhi Zarra Si Der Mein Yeh Raat Gungunayegi"
  - "Yun Husn Ka Jalwa"
- Mama Bhanja - "Baat Yeh Kaisi Keh Di Zalim" with Mohammed Rafi
- Mamta -
  - "Hai Yeh Pal Chanchal Badi Hulchul" with Shyamal Mitra
  - "Kabhi Toh Miloge, Kahin Toh Miloge"
  - "Nanhe Munne Pyare Abhi Toh Dulare"
- Mastan Dada -
  - "Dil Hai Tera Jaisa Bhi Hai"
  - "Tum Jo Mile Ho Gair Se" with Mahendra Kapoor, and Jaani Babu Qawwal
- Mera Vachan Geeta Ki Kasam -
  - "Pyaar Kiya Nahin Jaata"
  - "Man Mohan Se Preet Badhayi"
  - "Mora Resham Ka Ghagra"
  - "Doongi Yeh Dil Tujhe"
  - "Achchha Lagta Hai Yeh Bhola Bhala Sanwariya"
- Mukti -
  - "Main Jo Chala Peekar" with Kishore Kumar
  - "Dil Saajan Jalta Hai, Yeh Badan Jalta Hai"
- Naami Chor -
  - "Aapse Mujhe Aapse Maniye Na Maniye"
  - "Aaye Hai Jo Mehfil Mein" with Mahendra Kapoor
  - "Gori Tori Mathe Pe Saj Gayi Bindiya" with Usha Mangeshkar
- Niyaz Aur Namaz - "Muhabbat Sab Ki Dil Mein Hai"
- Palkon Ki Chhaon Mein -
  - "Allah Megh De" with Kishore Kumar
- Pandit Aur Pathan -
  - "Tune Pyar Se Liya Jo Mera Naam"
  - "Kaise Bholu Meri Khatir Tune" with Manna Dey, Mohammed Rafi, Dilraj Kaur, Kumar Sonik, and Sunita
  - "Bataye Rakhi Ka Tyohaar" with Manna Dey, Mohammed Rafi, Dilraj Kaur, Kumar Sonik, and Sunita
  - "Bam Bam Bhole, Khila De Bhang Ke Gole" with Manna Dey
- Parvarish -
  - "Aji Thehro Zara Kuchh Socho" with Aarti Mukherjee, Shailendra Singh, and Amit Kumar
  - "Aaiye ShaShauq Se Kahiye" with Kishore Kumar
- Priyatama - "Chham Chham Barse"
- Ram Bharose -
  - "Neend Udeygi Tera Chein Udega" with Mohammed Rafi
  - "Oh Husno Wafa Ke Diwano" with Kishore Kunar
  - "Ha Jee Le Gaya Sajna"
- Ranga Aur Rajaa -
  - "Raja Mere Dil Ke Raja" with Mohammed Rafi
  - "Are Re Re Jaata Kaha Hai"
  - "Ho Gayi Yaari Jo Tujhse Yara"
  - "Mubarak Ho Khushi Ka Mauka Hai" with Manna Dey
- Safed Jhooth -
  - "Chori Chori Aiyo Raadhe Jamuna Kinare"
  - "Matwale Pal Ye Kar Gaye Pagal Re"
- Sahib Bahadur - "Yeh Pyaar Ka Nasha, Nasha Hai Ausa" with Kishore Kumar
- Shaque -
  - "Ek Dil Hai Ek Jaan Hai" with Mohammed Rafi
  - "Megha Barasne Laga Hai Aaj Ki Raat"
  - "Kaha Aa Gayi Mai Ye Kaha Aa Gayi Main"
- Shirdi Ke Sai Baba -
  - "Deepavali Manaayi Suhani"
  - "O Dukhiyo Ke Daata"
  - "Dar Bhi Chhoda, Tujhe Man Mein Basa Ke"
- Subah Zaroor Aayegi -
  - "Meri Aanchal Ka Diya Hai Tu"
  - "Bharat Ke Hum Rehnewale" with Usha Mangeshkar
- Swami - "Aaj Ki Raat Hogi Kuchh Aisi Baat" with K. J. Yesudas
- Taxi-Taxie -
  - "Humein Toh Aaj Aisi Baat Par"
  - "Bhavron Kj Gungun"
  - "Laayi Kahan Aye Zindagi" with Lata Mangeshkar
- Thief of Baghdad -
  - "Daroga Babu Hume Band Kar Lo" with Usha Mangeshkar
  - "Teri Khatao Ki Kya Du Saza" with Sulakshana Pandit
- Tyaag -
  - "Tujhe Pyaas Hai Mere Paas Hai"
  - "Kora Kagaz Pe Likhwa Le" with Kishore Kumar
- Veeru Ustad -
  - "Aisi Shaam Kabhi Na Aayi Hai" with Om, and Dilraj Kaur
  - "Khol De Tijori Armano Ki" with Dilraj Kaur
  - "Jai Shiv Shankar Jhuth Bolne Wale Ka" with Dilraj Kaur, and Usha Mangeshkar
  - "Mar Jaungi Main Gadi Nichey Aake" with Usha Mangeshkar, Kumar Sonik, and Jaspal Singh
- Vishwasghaat -
  - "Duniya Mein Sukh Bhi Hai, Dukh Bhi Hai"
  - "Har Cheez Ki Hadh Hoti Hai"
- Wohi Baat -
  - "Zahar Deta Hai Mujhe Koi (female)"
  - "Zindagi Hum Tere Haal Par"
  - "Zahar Deta Hai Mujhe Koi (duet)" with Bhupinder Singh
- Yaaron Ka Yaar -
  - "Pehli Pehli Baar Mujhko Yeh Kya Ho Gaya" with Mohammed Rafi
  - "Mere Lal, Mujh Pe Kar Tu"
  - "Dekho Mehfil Mein Main"
- Yehi Hai Zindagi - "Kaali Kaali Kaise Kaate Raaten"
- Zamaanat -
  - "Kahe Mujhse Kare Tu Chhedchar" with Mohammed Rafi
  - "Teri Diwani Nachegi Gayegi"
  - "Yak Tuk Migla Giggla Bola"
  - "Main Hoon Rani Jaduwali"

=== 1978 ===
- Aakhri Daku - "Kahin Na Jiya Laage Toh"
- Aatish -
  - "Aji Zara Si Baat Par"
  - "Haye Main mari"
- Amar Shakti -
  - "Sahibon Hum Aapko" with Kishore Kumar
  - "Thehro Thehro"
- Anjaam -
  - "Janeman Chod Kar Apni Sharmo Haya"
  - "Kasam Hai Tujhko Aaj To Sun Le"
  - "O Gori Yunhi Sharm Agar Mujhse Jo Karti Rahi" with Mohammed Rafi
- Anjane Mein -
  - "Dil Ka Rishta Jod Diya Hai" with Kishore Kumar
  - "Meri Jaan Zara Thik Se Dekho" with Kishore Kumar
- Anpadh -
  - "Salamat Raho Tum Ke Mujhko Jami Se Utha Ke" with Kishore Kumar
  - "Ae Ji Kaho Kya Haal Hai Ae Ji Kaho Kya Haal Hai" with Kishore Kumar
  - "Humra Mukhda Chand Ke Tukda Humra Mukhda Chand Ke Tukda" with Mohammed Rafi
  - "Allah Miya Jodi Salamat Rakhna" with Mohammed Rafi
  - "Ghar Ke Andar Ammi Baba" with Mohammed Rafi
- Apna Khoon -
  - "Kuchh Aur Bhi Tujhse" with Mohammed Rafi
  - "Hakim Tarachand Jo Rupaye Maange Paanch" with Mohammed Rafi
  - "Sun Sajna Kuch Aur Bhi Tujhse Kahna Hai" with Mohammed Rafi
  - "Mere Budhape Ko Tu Cash Karlo" with Mohammed Rafi
  - "Char Char Hai Lutere" with Omi
  - "Mujhpe Bhi To Dalo Ek Nazar"
  - "Thehriye Huzur Suniye Janaab"
- Atithee - "Tu Hi Hai He Prabhi" with Usha Timothy, and Kanchan
- Bade Miyaan -
  - "Intezaar Sii Mauke Ka Tha" with Kishore Kumar
- Bandie - "Range Na Mann Rang Mein Agar" with Kishore Kumar
- Bebus -
  - "Pyaar Jab Kiya To Dil Ka Aetbaar Karna" with Kishore Kumar
- Besharam - "Mere Kis Kaam Ki Yeh Jawani"
- Bhakti Mein Shakti -
  - "Saasu Meri Mangti Hai Munna Re" with Kumar Sonik
  - "Sun Kamla Sun Bimla" with Dilraj Kaur
- Bhola Bhala -
  - "Kaali Kaali Raaton Mein"
  - "Kal Ki Fikar Karega Jo"
- Bhookh -
  - "Balma Anadi Rang Dale Holi Ka" with Mohammed Rafi
  - "Us Maalik Ki Daya Se Ab" with Mohammed Rafi
  - "Kaam Karo Ha Kaam Karo" with Mohammed Rafi, Dilraj Kaur, and Kumar Sonik
  - "Jai Bolo Bolo Bholenath Ki" with Kumar Sonik, and Mohammed Rafi
  - "Ghunghru Chhanke Bin Tore Kaise"
  - "Tapti Dupariya Ma Paon Jalat More" with Dilraj Kaur
- Chakravyuha - "Shaadi Karne Se Pyaar" with Kishore Kumar
- Chautha Paalana -
  - "Chautha Paalana"
- Chhoti Bahen -
  - "Jhanan Jhanan Jhanke" with Asit Desai
  - "Chakki Gham Gham Gaaye"
- Chor Ho To Aisa -
  - "Gusse Mein Tan Ke Chal Padi Main"
  - "Piya Agar Abhi Na Toh Kabhi Na"
  - "Yaha Se Hum Uthe Toh" with Manna Dey, and Mohammed Rafi
  - "Masti Mein Baith Ke Lagao" with Hemant Kumar, and Kishore Kumar
- Chor Ke Ghar Chor - "Nathaniya Kaga Lekar Bhaaga"
- Daaku Aur Jawan -
  - "Rakh Di Haay Beech Sadak Maine Gagariya" with Kishore Kumar
  - "Jhoola Jhoolat Kanhaiya Re" with Lata Mangeshkar
- Daan Dahej - "Jab Se Dil" with Kishore Kumar
- Damaad -
  - "Zindagi Ke Safar Mein Na Jaane" with Mohammed Rafi
  - "Mujhe Tadpati Rahi Roz Stati Rahi" with Mohammed Rafi
  - "Jaage Jaage Nainon Mein Andekhe Sapne"
  - "Chalo Na No No Please" with Amol Palekar
- Darwaza -
  - "Lo Hamen Bahon Mein"
  - "Ae Ji Kahan Gum Ho"
- Dil Aur Deewaar -
  - "Yeh Dhuan Kahan Se Utha Hai"
  - "Tod De Tu Is Bandhan Ko, Yeh Farz Nahin" with Lata Mangeshkar
- Do Musafir - "More Waiyan Bhaye Kotwal"
- Don -
  - "Yeh Mera Dil"
- Ganga Ki God Mein -
  - "Bhanwara O Bhanwata Yeh To Bata"
  - "Hat Chhod Raah Mori Julmi"
  - "Paalanhari Pranon Se Pyari O Gange"
  - "Yeh To Keh Chand Hamen" with P. B. Sreenivas
  - "Naache Re Man Mora" with P. B. Sreenivas
  - "Le Hi Gayi Baaton Mein Tu" with Manna Dey
- Ganga Ki Saugandh -
  - "Aankh Ladi Humse (female)"
  - "Aankh Ladi Humse (duet)" with Kishore Kumar
- Geeta Banee Geet - "Suno Toh Meri Jaan" with Manna Dey
- Ghar -
  - "Botal Se Ek Baat Chali Hai" with Mohammed Rafi
- Gunaahon Ka Devta - "Chhapan Chhuri Main"
- Hamara Sansar -
  - "Taji Taji Lelo Bhaji"
  - "Zulfen Jo Munh Pe" with Manna Dey
- Heeralal Pannalal -
  - "Kisne Dekha Hai Kal" with R D Burman
  - "Kahiye Kahan Se Aana Hua" with Kishore Kumar, Lata Mangeshkar, and Bhupinder Singh
  - "Main Dhal Gayi Rang Mein Tere" with Kishore Kumar
- Hunterwali 77 -
  - "Zulmon Sitam Par Itranewale"
  - "Mere Kitne Roop, Kabhi Chhaya Kabhi Dhoop"
- Insaan Aur Insaan - "Holi Aayi Re Dulhan Banke" with Mahendra Kapoor, Chandrani Mukherjee, and S. Balbir
- Jaan Se Pyaara -
  - "Pyaar Ka Jalwa Bhadke Jiya Mein"
  - "Main Akeli Haseena"
- Jai Ganesh -
  - "Tu Hai Mera Sanwarita"
  - "Jai Mangalmurti Moriya" with Poornima
  - "Hey Gajanand Anand Kand Mai Aayi" with Mahendra Kapoor
- Jalan - "Jo soch Ke Karega, Woh Pyaar Kya Karega" with Mohammed Rafi
- Johnny Uska Naam -
  - "Humse Jo Kaanon Mein Kaho"
  - "Aa Ab Toh Saajan"
  - "Humse Sharmate Hain"
- Junoon - "Ghir Aayi Kari Ghata" with Varsha Bhosle
- Kaala Aadmi -
  - "Aaj Hamen Ek Jaan Ka Dushman" with Mohammed Rafi, and Manna Dey
  - "Kisi Tarah Se Koi Raat Ko Lamba Kar Do" with Usha Mangeshkar
  - "Bujha Do Diye"
- Karmayogi -
  - "Aaiye Huzoor, Aaiye Baithiye"
  - "Mohabbat Hoon, Haqeeqat Hoon"
  - "Aaj Faisla Ho Jayeg" with Kishore Kumar, and Mohammed Rafi
- Kasme Vaade -
  - "Aati Rahengi Baharen" with Kishore Kumar, and Amit Kumar
  - "Mile Jo Kadi Kadi Ek Zanjeer Bane" with Kishore Kumar, and Mohammed Rafi
  - "Pyaar Ke Rang Se Tu Dil Ko" with Anand Kumar C.
  - "Gumsum Kyun Hai Sanam"
- Kharidaar - "Aaj Tujhe Main Aisa Jalwa Dikhaoongi"
- Kissa Kursi Ka -
  - "Jan Gan Desh Ke Gaayak Hai (version 1)" with Mahendra Kapoor
- Lal Kothi -
  - "Ae Mere Dil Dewane"
  - "Dil Se, Bhulayi Gayi Na Teri Yaad"
  - "Dhala Din Aise" with Amit Kumar
- Maa Baap - "Amrit Bhara Hai Antar Jiska"
- Mahima Shri Ram Ki -
  - "Bol Sakhi Bol Bhed Zara Khol" with Usha Mangeshkar
  - "Main Hoon Teri" with Mahendra Kapoor
  - "O Nishkalank Gange"
- Main tulsi Tere Aangan Ki - "Chhap Tilak Sab Chhini Re" with Lata Mangeshkar
- Mauqaa -
  - "Gaya Dil Haathon Se" with Bhupinder Singh
- Mera Rakshak - "Kya Hua Tujhe Kya Hua"
- Mezaan -
  - "Koi Dil Ka Haal Na Jaane" with Hariharan
  - "Dil Hai Tera Ghar" with Hariharan
  - "Gussa Hokar" with Amit Kumar, and R D Burman
- Mr. Hasmukh - "Jo Hoga Dekha Jaayega, Aao Hum Tum pyaar Karein" with Kishore Kumar
- Muqable Ki Raat -
  - "Mujhe Ek Ladka Chahiye" with Mohammed Rafi
- Murder On Highway -
  - "Saawan Ki Pari, Chup Hai Khadi" with Mohammed Rafi
  - "O Matwale Jaam Utha Le"
  - "Aap Khoobsurat Hai"
- Muqaddar Ka Sikandar -
  - "O Sathi Re Tere Bina Bhi Kya Jeena (female)"
  - "Wafa Jo Na Ki To Jafa Bhi Na Kije"
  - "Pyar Zindagi Hai Pyar Bandagi Hai" with Lata Mangeshkar, and Mahendra Kapoor
- Nageena -
  - "Tere Mere Pyaar Ka Andaaz Hai Nirala" with Kishore Kumar
  - "Dil Kis Kisko Doongi Main"
- Naukri - "Teri Duhayi Harjaai, Tere Naam Se Badnaam Ho Gaye"
- Nawab Sahib -
  - "Ek Khwab-e-Tamanna Bhule The"
- Naya Daur -
  - "Mujhe Doston Tum Gale Se Laga Lo" with Mohammed Rafi, and Danny Denzongpa
  - "Chalo Kahin Aur Chalte Hain" with Kishore Kumar
- Nazrana - "Ek Roz Mujhse Poochha Kisi Ne"
- Pal Do Pal Ka Saath -
  - "Yeh Radha Kanhaiya Ke Naam Kaise"
- Parmatma -
  - "Pyar Ka Tum Badla"
  - "Apni Nazar Mein"
  - "Aankh Ladti Hai"
  - "Ty Sab Ki Maata" with Ganga Prasad
  - "Surangani" with Bhupinder
- Pati Patni Aur Woh -
  - "Ladki Cycle Wali" with Mahendra Kapoor
  - "Thande Thande Paani Se Nahana" with Mahendra Kapoor, and Poornima
- Phandebaaz - "Tera Dimaag Aur Mera Shabab"
- Phool Khile Hain Gulshan Gulshan -
  - "Jo Insan Jitna Hi Paseena Bahaye" with Manna Dey, and Mohammed Rafi
- Premi Gangaram -
  - "Laddu Vand Di Gali De"
  - "Billiya Billiya Aakkha De Wich"
  - "Ik Mahi Dil Ko Das Gaya" with Rani Gairola
- Rahu Ketu -
  - "Yeh Surahi Kare"
  - "Mujhe Chhuna Na"
  - "Thehri Tujhpe Meri Nazar"
- Ram Kasam -
  - "Do Milte Toh Kasam Khuda Ki" with Omi
  - "Haye Meri Majboor Jawaani"
  - "Aaj Teri Mehfil Mein" with Manna Dey
  - "Uyi Maa Machhaiya Hai" with Mahendra Kapoor
- Saahira - "Dhadkan Hai Tu Har Dil Ki" with Mohammed Rafi, S. Balbir, and Brij Bhushan
- Saajan Bina Suhagan -
  - "O Jaani, Jaani Tum, O Jaane Tum"
- Sajni - "Ghazab Hua Sajna Tune Roka Mujhe Shaam Se" with Mohammed Rafi
- Shalimar -
  - "Mera Pyaar Shalimar"
- Shikar Shikaru Ka -
  - "Saathi Mere saathi"
  - "Shikar Shikari Ka"
- Swarag Narak - "Nahi Nahi Koi Tumsa Nahin" with Kishore Kumar
- Sone Ka Dil Lohe Ka Haath -
  - "Mohabbat Ho Gayi Hai, Qayamat Ho Gayi Hai"
- Subah Kahin Shaam Kahin - "Mohe Chhuna Na"
- Teen Eekay -
  - "Tun Ho Johri" with Dilraj Kaur, and Joginder
  - "Jua Kisi Ka Na Hua"
  - "Yeh Gora Badan"
  - "Parde Me Pyar Kare"
  - "Najar Kajrari Ho" with Usha Mangeshkar
- Teri Nazar Teri Ada -
  - "Dilwalon Ki Toli Nikli" with Mohammed Rafi
  - "Likha Hai Itihaas Mein" with Mohammed Rafi
- The Revenger -
  - "Masti Mein Hoon"
  - "Loot Lo Meri Duniya" with Mohammed Rafi
  - "Ari Bin Bulaye Main Aoongi Nahi" with Ambar Kumar
- Tumhare Liye -
  - "Mere Hathon Mein Lage To Rang"
  - "Bansuriya Man Har Legayi"
- Tumhari Kasam - "Hum Dono Milke, Kaagaz Pe Dil Ke" with Mukesh
- Vishwanath -
  - "Bibadha-Aaj Karegi Manmani"
- Waapsi - "Aaj Ka Din Ko Dekha Hi Nahin"
- Yasmeen -
  - "Hai Raat Pyasi Chhodo Udaasi"
  - "Suno Ek Kahani"

=== 1979 ===
- Aaj Ki Radha -
  - "Khilta Hai Jo Raat Ko"
  - "Main Zindagi Ki Talash Mein"
  - "Yeh Ham Jaante Hain"
- Aatish -
  - "Kahin Naam Na Apna Likh Dena" with Mohammed Rafi, and Hemlata
  - "Ho Rabba, Ladke Ke Bhes Mein Ladki Hoon"
  - "Main Nehla Thi Bas Nehla"
- Adventures of Aladdin -
  - "Jaadu Teri Nazar Ka"
  - "Ae Mere Hunnawa Tu Nahin Jaanta" with Mohammed Rafi
  - "Aa Gaya Aa Gaya" with Manna Dey
- Ahinsa -
  - "Mujhe Dena Re Badhai Gaonwalon" with Mohammed Rafi
  - "Thoda Thoda Sach"
  - "Maine Tan Man De Dala"
- Ahsaas - "Kuchh Khone Ko Dil Karta Hai"
- Amar Deep -
  - "Duniya Hai Bewafa"
- Atmaram -
  - "Kahan Hai Woh Jinhe Naaz Hai In Kinaaron Par"
  - "Mujhe Ladka Pasand Tu Hi Aaya"
- Bagula Bhagat -
  - "Mehfil Mein Meri Aaye Hai" with Kishore Kumar
  - "Chali Aayi Tere Pichhe"
- Baton Baton Mein -
  - "Suniye, Kahiye" with Kishore Kumar
  - "Na Bole Tum Na Maine Kuchh Kaha" with Amit Kumar
- Bhala Manus -
  - "Jaan Pehchaan To Pahle Se Thi" with Kishore Kumar
  - "Kabhi Hansi Aur Kabhi Reham Aata Hai Tere Hal Pe"
  - "Kaise Kahu Man Ki Baat"
  - "Jo Tu Kahe To Main Pol Teri Khol Du"
  - "Gumsum Kyun Hain Sanam"
- Bin Phere Hum Tere -
  - "Mujhko Inhi Logon Ne"
  - "Main Kya Maangun"
- Chhathh Mayiya Ki Mahima - "Rasik Bhanware Ore Ek Kamsin Kali Ka Ras Le Le"
- Deen Aur Imaan -
  - "La Ilaahi Bhej De Mushkil"
  - "Nazar Bhar Ke Tumhen Dekha Nahin Jaata"
  - "Tum Par Salaam Arsh Ki" with Mohammed Rafi
  - "Tum Pe Nazil Hua Quran" with Mohammed Rafi
- Dhongee -
  - "Haye Re Haye Tera Ghongta" with Kishore Kumar
  - "Wahan Chalo Jis Jagah Aur Koi Na Ho" with Kishore Kumar
  - "Dil Chheena Chain Churaya"
  - "Rangon Ki Chhanv Dhoop Mein" with Kishore Kumar, and Amit Kumar
- Dil Kaa Heera -
  - "Hanste Hanste Log Lagte Hain Rone"
  - "Hanste Hanste Tu Kyon Lag Gaya Rone"
  - "Zindagi Ka Yoon Jubaan Par Naam Aana Chaahiye (version 1)" with Mohammed Rafi, and Amit Kumar
  - "Zindagi Ka Yoon Jubaan Par Naam Aana Chaahiye (version 1)" with Mohammed Rafi, and Amit Kumar
- Do Ladke Dono Kadke - "Chanda Ki Doli Mein" with K. J. Yesudas
- Do Shikaari -
  - "Honth Ye Mere Aag Se Nahi Kam"
  - "Pagal Hawa Raate Diwani"
- Duniya Meri Jeb Mein -
  - "Saari Ki Saari Yeh Duniya Meri Jeb Mein" with Kishore Kumar
  - "Kuch Sochoon, Haan Socho, Kuch Boloon, Haan Bolo" with Kishore Kumar
  - "Yeh Bhi Dil Maangta"
- Ganga Aur Geeta - "Aise Pee Li Uthna Mushkil Hai"
- Gautam Govinda -
  - "O Tera Bitwa Jawan Hoi Gawa" with Mohammed Rafi
  - "Daroga Ji Chori Ho Gato"
- Gawaah -
  - "Duniya Meri Deewani"
  - "Aayi Door Se, Laayi Pyaar Se"
- Guru Ho Jaa Shuru - "Saare Duniya Mein Qatil Hi Qatil Bhare"
- Habari -
  - "Tu Hai Mera Khuda Ka Kamaal" with Kishore Kumar
- Har Har Gange -
  - "Main Janam Janam Se Karu Tapasya"
  - "Tum Ho Madhu Pyase Bhanware"
  - "Main Janam Janam Se Karu Tapasya"
  - "Main Rambha Roop Ki Raani" with Hemlata
- Heroine Ek Raat Ki -
  - "Kismat Me Tabahi Likhi Thi"
  - "Main Jaam Pilati Hun"
  - "Chal Gori Chal" with Mohammed Rafi
- Hum Tere Aashiq Hain -
  - "Naacho Re Masti Mein"
  - "Hindi English Ki Pothi"
  - "Zara Hanskar Kar Le Baat" with Mahendra Kapoor
  - "Mushkil Hai Ab Raaz Chhupana" with Mahendra Kapoor
  - "Hurrey, Maar Liya Maidan" with Kishore Kumar
- Inspector Eagle -
  - "Tum Kyun Aate Nahin"
  - "Chalo Aaye Aam Uthayen"
  - "Aao Pal Bhar Ko Tum Roshni Mein"
- Jaandaar -
  - "Gokul Ki Galiyon Ka" with Kishore Kumar
  - "Suniye Hawaldar" with Mahendra Kapoor, and Mahesh Kumar
  - "Koi Mere Dil Ke"
  - "Lo Chala Nazar Ka Teer"
- Jaani Dushman -
  - "Arre Sun Bhai Sadho" with Kishore Kumar, and Mohammed Rafi
  - "Aisi Waisi Na, Samajh Sajna" with Shatrughan Sinha
  - "Tere Hathon Mein Pehnake Choodi" with Mohammed Rafi
- Jhoota Kahin Ka -
  - "Jeevan Ke Har Mod Pe" with Kishore Kumar
  - "Barah Baje Kee Suiyo Jaise" with Kishore Kumar
  - "Dekho Mera Jadoo"
  - "Jhutha Kahee Ka Mujhe Aisa Mila"
- Jurmana - "Naachun Main Gaao Tum" with R D Burman
- Kanoon Ka Shikar -
  - "Kya Haseen Shaam Hai"
  - "Hanste Hi Rehna Mere Yaar"
- Kartavya -
  - "Maine Thodi Si Chadhayi To Aisi Chadhi" with Mohammed Rafi
  - "Mera Dil Leke Chal Diye"
- Lok Parlok -
  - "Amma Ri Amma, Yeh To Deewana Raste Mein Chhede" with Kishore Kumar
  - "Baadal Kab Barsoge, Jab Barsoge, Tab Barsoge" with Kishore Kumar
  - "Hum Tum Jeet Gaye, Dushman Haar Gaye" with Kishore Kumar
  - "Bedardi Piya, Tune Jo Bhi Kaha"
- Maan Apmaan - "Apni Garaj Bairi Peechhe Peechhe Aaye"
- Magroor -
  - "Haseen Raat Mein, Allah Kasam, Mulaqat Mein" with Mohammed Rafi
  - "Rukhsana Rukhsana, Main Tera Deewana" with Manna Dey
- Manzil - "Man Mera Chahe"
- Meri Biwi Ki Shaadi -
  - "Mujhse Shaam Suhaani Poochhe Prem Kahani" with Mohammed Rafi
- Mr. Natwarlal - "Tauba Tauba Kya Hoga"
- Muqabla -
  - "Aaja Na, Aaja Na, Aaja Na"
  - "Dilwale Yaar Sajna, Yahi Mera Dil Dua Kare" with Anwar
  - "Muqabla Hai Muqabla, Muqabla Hai Muqabla" with Mahendra Kapoor
  - "Meri Rus Gayi Jhanjharwali" with Kishore Kumar
- Naukar -
  - "Pallo Latke Re Mharo Pallo Latke" with Kishore Kumar
  - "Dekhi Hazaron Mehfilen, Par Yeh Fiza Kuch Aur Hai" with Mohammed Rafi
  - "Aaya Na Karo Gudiya"
- Noorie - "Qadar Tune Na Jaani"
- Phool Aur Insaan -
  - "Raqasa Hoon Main Par"
- Prem Bandhan -
  - "Hoti Hai Kisi Se Jab Preet" with Kishore Kumar, and Pankaj
  - "Aamli Ki Taamli Taamli Ke Gaon Mein" with Manna Dey
  - "Meri Payal Me Ye Ghungru"
- Raakhi Ki Saugandh -
  - "Jina Chahe To Jee Le"
  - "Pehli Pehli Hai Raja Mulaqat"
  - "O Qaidi Do Baaton Ka"
  - "Tu Ashiq Hai Ya Majnu Hai" with Mahendra Kapoor
  - "I Like You" with Manna Dey
- Ratnadeep -
  - "Man Bahek Raha Hai"
  - "Aisa Ho To Kaisa Hoga"
  - "Kabhi Kabhi Sapna Lagta Hai" with Kishore Kumar
- Saahas - "Ek Ghar Banaye, Sapne Sajaye" with Bhupinder Singh
- Salaam Memsaab -
  - "Tera Kaha Maine Kiya"
  - "Tum Bhi Meri Jaan"
- Sarkari Mehman -
  - "Bambai Sham Ke Baad Hasin"
  - "Sun Sun Re Sarkari Mehman"
  - "Parcha Mohabbat Ka De De Re Babu"
  - "Lucknow Chhuta To Dilli Ne Loota"
  - "Na Zulm Ki Mari Hoon"
- Shaayad -
  - "Main Suraj Ki Roshni Tu Chanda Ki Chandani" with Mohammed Rafi
  - "Mausam Ayega Jayega, Pyaar Sada Muskurayega" with Manna Dey
- Shabash Daddy - "O Meri Jaanejaan" with Kishore Kumar
- Shyamla -
  - "Main Karti Hoon Tumse Pyaar"
- Suhaag -
  - "O Sheronwali" with Mohammed Rafi
  - "Main Toh Beghar Hoon" with Shashi Kapoor
  - "Teri Rab Ne Bana Di Jodi" with Shailendra Singh, and Mohammed Rafi
  - "Ae Yaar Sun Yaari Teri" with Shailendra Singh, and Mohammed Rafi
- The Great Gambler -
  - "Tum Kitne Din Baad Mile"
  - "O Deewano Dil Sambhalo"
  - "Do Lafzon Ki Hai" with Sharat Kumar
  - "Pehle Pehle Pyaar Ki Mulaqaaten" with Kishore Kumar
  - "Raqqasa Mera Naam" with Mohammad Rafi
- Yuvraaj -
  - "Aankhob Se Na Baatein Kar" with Mohammad Rafi
  - "Mere Yaro Zara Muh Udhar Pher Lo" with Kishore Kumar

== 1980s ==
=== 1980 ===
- Aanchal -
  - "Paise Ka Kajal" with Kishore Kumar
  - "Jane De Gaadi Teri"
- Aap To Aise Na The -
  - "Mera Yaar Rahe Zinda, Mera Pyaar Rahe Zinda"
  - "Kismat Ki Baazi Ka Faisla To Ho Gaya Hai" with Manhar Udhas, and Suresh Wadkar
- Abdullah -
  - "Jashn-e-Bahara Mehfil-e-Aala"
  - "Bheega Badan Jalne Laga"
- Alibaba aur 40 Chor -
  - "Khabouba Khatouba"
  - "Sare Shehar Mein Ek Hasin Hai" with Lata Mangeshkar
  - "Jadugar Jadu Kar Jayega" with Kishore Kumar
- Angaar -
  - "Phenk Pyar Ka Jaal"
  - "Koi Bhi Khud Ko Kitna Bachaye" with Omi
  - "Chalti Sanse Thandi Aahe" with Yogita Bali
  - "Is Jahan Mein Mera Na Koi Dooja"
- Apne Paraye - "Gaao Mere Mann Chahe Surah Chamke" with K. J. Yesudas
- Badla Aur Balidaan -
  - "Tune Roop Churaya Goriye" with Omi, and Mohammed Rafi
  - "Mujhe Mil Gaya Bichhda Yaar" with Manna Dey, and Mohammed Rafi
- Bambai Ka Maharaja -
  - "Bambai Ka Maharaja Kabhi To Kahin Se Aayga"
  - "Mil Gaya Mil Gaya Dil Se Dil Jaane Jaan" with Amit Kumar
- Ban Manush -
  - "Gore Mukhde Se Mera Hata De Naqaab"
  - "Rang Bhi Uda Uda Hai," with Mohammed Rafi
  - "Haath Mein Baja, Saath Mein Bandar" with Shailendra Singh
- Bandish -
  - "Rang Bhare Mausam Se Rang Le Lo" with Kishore Kumar
  - "Mere Hosh Le Lo Diwana Bana Do" with Kishore Kumar
  - "Are Bhago Are Daudo Are Dekho" with Kishore Kumar
  - "Saiyya Ji Ne Ghar Banwaya"
- Beqasoor -
  - "Aankh Jhukne Lagi"
  - "Aisa Ji Koi Aata"
- Be-Reham -
- Bharat Ke Santan - "Shaba Shaba Bambai Ke Banane Wale" with Usha Mangeshkar
- Bombay 405 Miles -
  - "Kasam Na Lo Koi Humse" with Kishore Kumar
  - "Ho Gaye Hum Aapke, Kasam Se, Kasam Se, Kasam Se" with Mohammed Rafi
- Chaal Baaz -
  - "Tujhe Lattoo Bana Doon"
  - "Hai Shaam Badi Matwali" with Amit Kumar
- Chetna Dorahe Par -
  - "Laaj Meri Teri Haath Hai Ab Sanam" with Mohammed Rafi
  - "Main Samjhati Thi Jise Dil Ki Kharidaron Mein"
- Chunaoti -
  - "Har Subah Tumhari Mehfil Mein" with Lata Mangeshkar
  - "Main Rok Loongi Tujhe Aake"
  - "Sanjh Ki Bela Ek Albela"
- Cobra -
  - "O Saathi Re" with Anwar
  - "Toote Bihar Ki Ghungroo"
- Desh Drohi -
  - "Idhar Gaya Ya Udhar Gaya Dil"
  - "Holi Khelat Nandlal" with Kishore Kumar, and Mahendra Kapoor
- Dhamaka - "Meru Ankhon Mein Shole"
- Dhan Daulat -
  - "Jeena Kya Aji Pyar Bina, Jeevan Ke Yahi Chaar Dina" with Kishore Kumar
  - "Ho Jaaye Phir Us Din Ka Jo Vaada Hai" with Kishore Kumar
  - "Woh Jinki Nai Yeh Duniya, Manzil Hai Nai" with Kishore Kumar
  - "Shikwa Koi Tum Se, Na Hai Tum Pe Koi Zor"
- Do Aur Do Paanch - "Yeh Zulfon Ki Bikhri Ghata"
- Do Premee -
  - "Pyar Kar Pyar Kar" with Mohammed Rafi
  - "Mausam Pe Jawani Hai" with Mohammed Rafi
- Do Shatru -
  - "Ni Tu Pyaar Karke Chali Jaaye Bichhad Ke"
  - "Ye Najar Hai Najar Hai Najar"
  - "Main Billo Bangalore Ki"
- Dostana - "Dillagi Ne Di Hawa" with Kishore Kumar
- Ek Gunah Aur Sahi -
  - "Yehi Hai Tamanna"
- Ganga Aur Suraj -
  - "Ye Rahi Meri Jawani Koi Aankh To Uthaye" with Mohammed Rafi
  - "Hai Hai Re Mora Rangila Sajanwa"
  - "Jali Hai Nafrat Ki Aag DiL Mein"
- Gangadham -
  - "Tere Hi Liye Hoga Har Jeevan Mera" with Suresh Wadkar
  - "Jhinak Tina, Jee Na Lage Tere Bina" with Suresh Wadkar
  - "Mor Bhangia Ka Munni De O" with Mohammed Rafi
- Garam Khoon - "Paina Loopi Kehke Pukaaro"
- Gunehgaar -
  - "Tum Jaha Jaaoge"
  - "Kuch Din Baad Hi Ban Jayenge Hum Tum Daddy Mummy" with R D Burman
  - "Chaar Dinon Ki Hai Yeh Zindgani" with Kishore Kumar, and Bhupinder Singh
- Hum Nahin Sudhrenge -
  - "Rani O Rani" with Kishore Kumar
  - "Machhua Machhua" with Kishore Kumar
  - "Bhaag Phoote"
- Insaf Ka Tarazu -
  - "Log Aurat Ko"
  - "Hazaar Khwab Haqeeqat Ke Roop" with Mahendra Kapoor
  - "Hai Jo Yahi Pyar Ka Trailor" with Mahendra Kapoor, and Hemlata
- Jaayen To Jaayen Kahan -
  - "Gori Tere Aang Aang Lagayenge Rang" with Amit Kumar
  - "Chalti Hai Gaadi, Chadhna Maana Hai" with Amit Kumar
- Jal Mahal -
  - "Jai Jai Shyam"
  - "Zindagi Ko Jab"
  - "Tataiya Ne Dank Mara, Hay Mori Maiya" with Mohammed Rafi
- Judaai -
  - "Saamne Aa Dekhe Zamaana Sara" with Kishore Kumar
  - "Maar Gayi Mujhe Teri Judaai" with Kishore Kumar
  - "Mausam O Mausam Suhane Aa Gaye" with Mohammed Rafi
- Jwalamukhi -
  - "Kabhi Tumne Kisiko Phansa" with Kishore Kumar
  - "Tere Bina Bhi Nahin Jee Sakte" with Kishore Kumar, Mahendra Kapoor, and Hemlata
- Jyoti Bane Jwala -
  - "Main Jogan Hoon, Tu Jogi" with Kishore Kumar
  - "Tel Malish, Boot Polish" with Usha Mangeshkar
- Kala Pani -
  - "Garmi Karti Hai Nuksaan"
  - "Shama Jalti Hai"
  - "Koi Roko Ke Hum Pyar Karne Lage" with Mohammed Rafi
  - "Pyar Zindagi Hai" with Bhupinder Singh, and Laxmikant
- Kali Ghata -
  - "Tu Chali Aa, Chali Aa Meri Mehbooba" with Mohammed Rafi
  - "Nainon Ki Khidki"
  - "O Piya Bahroopiya"
  - "Mohabbat Ek Vaada Hai, Yeh Vaada Tod Mat Jana" with Hemlata
- Karz - "Ek Hasina Thi" with Kishore Kumar
- Kashish -
  - "Pardes Mein Jaake Tu Piya"
- Khoon Kharaba - "Raat Hone Lagi Jawaan"
- Khubsoorat -
  - "Saare Niyam Tod Do (version 2)"
  - "Piya Bawri"
  - "Sun Sun Sun Didi, Tere Liye"
- Kismet -
  - "Kuch Chhup Chhupke"
  - "Ek To Main Jawaan"
- Krishna Bhakta Sudama -
  - "Bhagwan Kisi Ko Bhi"
  - "Batla De Prabhu Kya"
- Lahoo Pukarega -
  - "Gulshan Aur Gulzaron Mein" with Mohammed Rafi
  - "Galiyo Me Bazaro Mein" with Usha Mangeshkar
  - "Kachchi Umar Hai Meri"
  - "Kisi Ko Suhani Shaam Ka Hai Intezar"
- Lootmaar - "Jab Chhaye Mera Jadoo"
- Maang Bharo Sajana -
  - "Deepak Mere Suhaag Ka Jalta Rahe" with Lata Mangeshkar
  - "Kisi Bazaar Se Dil Ki Khushi"
  - "Hum Barson Baad Mile, Yaadon Ke Phool Khile" with Kishore Kumar
  - "O Mere Mehboob, Hai Yeh Jodi Khoob" with Kishore Kumar
- Nazrana Pyar Ka -
  - "Baho Ke Ghere Me Mausam Bhar Ka" with Kishore Kumar
  - "Jab Se Dekha Hai Giraftar Hai" with Kishore Kumar
  - "Naya Saal Aaye, Tamase Dikhaye" with Amit Kumar, and Anwar
  - "Gham Chhupate Raho" with Mohammed Rafi
  - "Ye Dupatta Dupatta Dupatta Mera"
- Neeyat -
  - "Tumhe Aise Kaise De Doon"
  - "Pyase Dil Ki Pyas Bujhane"
- Nishana -
  - "Tip Tip Hone Lagi, Jadu Chalne Lage" with Kishore Kumar
  - "Jana, Zara Samne Aana" with Kishore Kumar
  - "Apni Mohabbat Se Sab Log Jalte Hai" with Kishore Kumar
  - "Maine Tujhe Jeet Liya, Tune Mujhe Jeet Liya" with Mohammed Rafi
- Parchhayeen -
  - "Koi Bhi Mausam Aaye Ke Jaaye"
  - "Tere Rang Me Rangi"
  - "Chehre Pe Parda"
- Phir Wohi Raat -
  - "Dekho Idhar Dekho, Ae Mere Humsafar" with Kishore Kumar, and Poornima
  - "Phir Wahi Raat Aayi"
- Premikaa - "Yeh Duniya Hai, Koi Khoye Koi Paaye"
- Pyaara Dushman -
  - "Saiyyan Aaye Na" with Kishore Kumar
  - "Tu Hai Meri Deewani" with Kishore Kumar
  - "Goriya Hame Jeena Teri Gali" with Kishore Kumar
  - "Ek Dhundho Milte Hai Hazaron" with Kishore Kumar
  - "Ae Tum Baahar Kaha Chale"
- Pyaar To Hona Hi Tha - "Chale Kahan Kahan Chale"
- Qurbani -
  - "Kya Dekhte Ho" with Mohammed Rafi
- Ram Balram -
  - "Humse Bhool Ho Gayi" with Kishore Kumar
  - "Yaar Ki Khabar Mil Gayi" with Kishore Kumar
  - "Balram Ne Bahut Samjhaya" with Mohammed Rafi, and Dilraj Kaur
- Red Rose -
  - "Kiski Sadaayen Mujhko Bulaayen" with Kishore Kumar
  - "Tere Bin Jeena Kya, Tere Bin Marna Kya (version 1)" with Kishore Kumar
  - "Tere Bin Jeena Kya, Tere Bin Marna Kya (version 2)" with Kishore Kumar
  - "Tere Bin Jeena Kya, Tere Bin Marna Kya (version 3)" with Kishore Kumar
- Reshma O Reshma - "Le Chal Kahin Nujhko"
- Room No. 203 -
  - "Kal Tha Mera, Aaj Tera Yeh Dil Hai"
  - "Yeh Jawaan Dil Ke Armaan"
- Saboot - "Loot Ada Ko Loot Le Raja"
- Sada Suhaagan -
  - "Humrahi Agar Kho Jaaye" with R D Burman
  - "Humrahi Agar Mil Jaaye" with R D Burman
- Sau Din Saas Ke - "Sau Saal Jiyo Hamare Saasu Ji" with Hemlata
- Shaan -
  - "Pyaar Karnewale" with Pankaj Udhas
  - "Tere Liye Jina Teri Liye Marna" with Lata Mangeshkar
  - "Dariya Mein Jahaaz Chale" with Usha Mangeshkar, and Kishore Kumar
  - "Jaanu Meri Jaan" with Usha Mangeshkar, Kishore Kumar, and Mohammed Rafi
- Shadi Se Pehle -
  - "Mere Nainon Mein Nandlala"
  - "Teri Sanson Mein" with Mohammed Rafi
- Shiv Shakti - "Palken Bichhaye Aas Lagaye, Tumko Pukaare Nera Pyaar"
- Sitara -
  - "Yeh Saaye Hai"
  - "Aap Aaye Garibkhane"
  - "Sajna Ka Kangna, Kangna Mein Heera" with Bhupinder Singh
  - "Saath Saath Tum Chalo To Raat Raatbhar Chale" with Bhupinder Singh
- Takkar -
  - "Achha Bahana Hai"
  - "Duniya Kya Hai"
  - "Yeh Tanhaiyan"
  - "Makhanchor Nandkishore Manmohan Ghanshyam Re" with Mohammed Rafi
- Taxi Chor - "Yaar Mera Laut Aaya Re" with Suresh Wadkar, and Anwar
- The Burning Train -
  - "Pal Do Pal Ka Saath Hamara" with Mohammed Rafi
  - "Pahali Nazar Me Hamne To Apna" with Usha Mangeshkar, R D Burman, and Amit Kumar
  - "Kisi Ke Wade Pe Kyo Aetbaar Humne Kiya"
  - "Meri Nazar Hai Tujh Pe"
  - "Vaadaa Ha Vaadaa Jab Tak Ambar Par" with Kishore Kumar
- Thodisi Bewafaii - "Barse Phuhar"
- Yari Dushmani -
  - "Sambhalkar Haseenon Se Aankhen Ladana" with Mohammed Rafi
  - "Zulf Mahekegi Gardish Mein Jaam Aayega" with Usha Mangeshkar
  - "Abba Abba, Abba Abba"
- Yeh Kaisa Insaaf -
  - "Kuchh Kehne Ko Aaya Tha" with Kishore Kumar
  - "Pyaar Main Karoonga" with Kishore Kumar
- Zakhmon Ka Hisab - "Sheeshe Ka Mera Badan"
- Zaalim -
  - "Chalo Kho Jaaye In Baharon Mein Hum" with Kishore Kumar

=== 1981 ===
- Aakhri Mujra -
  - "Tum Mere Koi Nahin"
  - "Nindiya Mori Nindiya"
  - "Mori Nathani Jhoome Re"
- Aapas Ki Baat -
  - "Rang Ude, Rangon Mein Dil Dooba" with Kishore Kumar
  - "Sun O Dilruba Dil Ki Sada"
- Agent 009 - "Teri Umar Ka Saal Badha"
- Agni Pareeksha -
  - "Pyaar Hi Pyaar Aur, Kuchh Bhi Nahin Hai"
- Ahista Ahista -
  - "Kabhi Kisi Ko Mukammal Jahaan"
  - "Jab Kabhi Khwab Chamakta Hai"
  - "Nazar Se Phul Chunti Hai Nazar" with Anwar
  - "Humko Mile Tum, Tumko Mile Hum" with Anwar
  - "Bin Bulaye Hum Chale Aaye"
- Barsaat Ki Ek Raat - "Manchali O Manchali" with Kishore Kumar
- Beshaque -
  - "Aa Jaye Na Aaye Na Kahin Dil Ko"
- Bharosa -
  - "Kaise Dekhoon Meri Aankhon Ki Bahot Kareeb Ho Tum" with Kishore Kumar
  - "Phoolon Ki Zubaan" with Kishore Kumar
- Baseraa -
  - "Chhup Chhup Chhupa Chhupi" with Vanita Mishra
  - "Tumhe Chhod Ke Ab Jine Ko Jee To Nain" with Kishore Kumar
  - "Aaungi Ek Din Aaj Jaaun"
- Bhula Na Dena -
  - "Dil Humne Jise"
  - "Socha Na Samjha"
- Biwi-O-Biwi - "Paise Ka Khel Nirala" with Mohammed Rafi
- Bulundi -
  - "Kaho Kahan Chale, Jahan Tum Le Chalo" with Kishore Kumar
  - "Hum Jab Ek Saath Hai Phir Yeh To Koi Daur Nahin" with Mohammed Rafi
  - "Ab Raat Ho Gayi Jawan, Gesu Kamar Tak Dhale" with Mohammed Rafi, Amit Kumar, and Dilraj Kaur
  - "Tera Dil O Re Babau"
- Chehre Pe Chehra -
  - "Main Hoon Pari Adaonbhari"
  - "Jaam Le Jaam, Pakad Jaam"
- Chhupa Chhupi - "Aa Baahon Mein Aa"
- Commander -
  - "Tu Pappa Ka Beta Hai" with Mahendra Kapoor, and Poornima
  - "Itni Jaldi Kya Hai Jaaneman"
- Dard -
  - "Qubool Kijiye"
  - "Jagmag Jagmag Si Mehfil" with Kishore Kumar
  - "Pyaar Ka Dard Hai, Meetha Meetha Pyara Pyara" with Kishore Kumar
- Dhuan -
  - "Yeh Hai Mauka"
  - "Phir Aankh Phadki"
- Dushman Dost -
  - "Main Hoon Woh Jaadugar" with Mohammed Rafi, and Kishore Kumar
  - "Main Wohi Hoon"
  - "Pardesi Bahen"
  - "Meri Behna Badi Pyari Hai" with Manna Dey, and Shivangi Kolhapure
- Ek Aur Ek Gyarah -
  - "Garibon Ki Holi Tarang Wali" with Kishore Kumar, and Hemlata
  - "Oh Jaani Aafat Tumhari" with Mohammed Rafi
- Ek Hi Bhool -
  - "Bistar Chhod Ke So Gaya"
  - "Hum Tunse Pyaar Na Karte Toh" with S. P. Balasubrahmanyam
  - "Sard Sard Raaton Mein" with S. P. Balasubrahmanyam
- Farz Aur Pyaar - "Bahaar Ko Nazaare Jaise" with Mohammed Rafi
- Fiffty Fiffty -
  - "Pyar Ka Vaada, Fiffty Fiffty" with Kishore Kumar
  - "Chhod Maza Haath, Mala Peene De" with Amit Kumar
  - "Jogan Ban Gayi Chhodke Main Saara Sansar"
  - "Pardesi O Pardesi"
- Ganga Mang Rahi Balidan - "Tum Mere Nainon Se Praanon Mein"
- Gehra Zakham -
  - "Chaal Mein Maal Leke Aaya Hai" with Mohammed Rafi, Anand Kumar, and Udit Narayan
  - "Mausam Bheega Bheega, Balam Seedha Seedha" with Kishore Kumar
  - "Chand Sa Chehra, Raat Si Zulfen, Hirni Jaisi Chaal" with Mohammed Rafi, and Bhupinder Singh
  - "Sheesha-E-Dil Mein Teri Hi Tasveer Hai" with Amit Kumar, Bhupinder Singh, and Suresh Wadkar
- Ghamandee -
  - "Kehta Hai Man Ka Panchhi" with Suresh Wadkar
  - "Ghunghat Me Naina"
  - "Sathi Hai Hum Janmo Ke"
- Ghungroo Ki Awaaz -
  - "Ankhiyon Ka Kajra" with Kishore Kumar
  - "Jo Bhi Tune Dekha"
  - "Roti Roti Raina"
- Guru Suleman Chela Pahalwan -
  - "Nageena Hoon Nageena, Angoothi Mein Jhada Le" with Usha Mangeshkar
  - "Aaye Qayamaat Jo Kholun Pat Ghoonghat Ke"
- Haqdaar -
  - "Aaja Re Aaja Mere Pyar Ko Pyaas Pukare" with Anwar
  - "O Deewane Jeena Hai To Jhoom Jhoomkar Jee Le" with Amit Kumar
  - "Nayi Zindagi, Nayi Baharen, Din Albele Aaye" with Manhar Udhas
- Harjaee -
  - "Jeevan Mein Jab Aise Pal Aayenge" with Kishore Kumar
  - "Sun Zara Shokh Haseena, Tu Hai Anmol Nagina" with Kishore Kumar
- Hotel - "Pyaar Karte Hain Hum Tumhen Itna" with Manhar Udhas
- Hum Se Badkar Kaun -
  - "Deva Ho Deva, Ganpati Deva, Tum Se Badhkar Kaun" with Mohammed Rafi, Bhupinder Singh, Shailendra Singh, and Sapan Chakraborty
  - "Dekho Logon, Yeh Kaisa Zamana" with Mohammed Rafi
  - "Huyi Umar Yeh"
- Jail Yatra - "Kya Takalluf Hai Wallah, Lijiye Dil Bismillah" with Mohammed Rafi, and Bhupinder Singh
- Jeene Ki Arzoo -
  - "Kachi Kachi Ambiya"
  - "Haath Na Lagana"
- Josh -
  - "Sheesha Sharab Shabnam Kabhi Gul Kabhi Gul"
  - "Jeet Lo Haar Ke, Jhel Yeh Pyaar Ke"
  - "Sab Kuchh To Hai Sab Kuchh To Hai"
- Jwaala Daaku -
  - "Paisa Phenk Tamasha Dekh"
  - "Jinhe Ek Baar"
  - "Mera Pyar Hai Rang Rangeela"
- Kaalia -
  - "Tum Saath Ho Jab Apne" with Kishore Kumar
  - "Jabse Tumko Dekha, Kehte Hain" with Kishore Kumar
  - "Sanam Tum Jahan Mera Dil Wahan"
  - "Dil Toh Dete Nahin"
- Kal Hamara Hai -
  - "Hum Tumse Shaadi Banana Mangta" with Mohammed Rafi
  - "Hai Ratiya Mori Nathiya"
  - "Yeh Nadiya Behti Hai" with Bhupinder Singh
- Kahani Ek Chor Ki -
  - "Yeh Raat Sard Sard Hai"
  - "Sabko Muraden Milti Hai" with Kishore Kumar
- Kanhaiya -
  - "Ataa Pata Koi Na Jane" with Usha Mangeshkar
  - "Janani Jagat Ki"
  - "Rajdulara Aankho Ka Tara"
  - "Rajdulara Aankh Ka Tara (Sad)"
- Kasam Bhawani Ki -
  - "Julam Bhayo Mope Kal Raat"
  - "Hum Jo Bewafa Huye"
- Katilon Ke Kaatil -
  - "Yak Bayak Koi Kahin Mil Jaata Hai" with Kishore Kumar
  - "Sare Bazaar Karenge Pyar" with Kishore Kumar
- Khara Khota -
  - "Kabhi Hoti Nahin Hia Jiski Haar"
  - "Zamane Mein Hamara Naam"
- Khoon Aur Paani -
  - "Duniya Ke Sitam" with Lata Mangeshkar
  - "Mat Jaa, Mat Jaa, Royega Dil" with Kishore Kumar
- Khoon Ki Takkar -
  - "Teri Meri Mohabbat Bhi Ek Amar Kahani Hai (version 1)" with Mohammed Rafi
  - "Tu Been Baja Sajna" with Mohammed Rafi
  - "Ae Tu Kya Hai"
  - "Teri Meri Mohabbat Bhi Ek Amar Kahani Hai (version 2)" with Aarti Mukherjee
- Khuda Kasam -
  - "Aap Ne Yeh Kya Keh Diya" with Mohammed Rafi
  - "Kachchi Kali Gulab Ki"
  - "Pyar Ne Di Awaaz"
- Krodhi -
  - "Ladkiwalon, Ladki Tumhari Kunwari Reh Jaati" with Kishore Kumar
  - "Phoolmati Ka Gajra"
- Kudrat -
  - "Sawan Nahin, Bhadon Nahin, O Bindiyawali Bata" with Suresh Wadkar
  - "Sajti Hai Yun Hi Mehfil"
- Laawaris - "Kab Ke Bichhade Huye Hum" with Kishore Kumar
- Ladies Tailor -
  - "Mere Mehboob Tum Ho Tumhi Ho" with Mohammed Rafi
  - "Sanam Ko Aane To Do" with Mahendra Kapoor, and Manna Dey
- Love Story -
  - "Kya Ghazab Karte Ho Ji"
  - "Yeh Ladki Zara Si Deewani Lagti Hai" with Amit Kumar
- Mahabali Hanuman - "Thirak Thirak Jhoom Jhoom"
- Maan Gaye Ustad -
  - "Ek Chhatri Aur Hum Hain Do" with Mohammed Rafi
  - "Hum Salaam Karte Hai Mehfil Mein"
  - "Jawaani Ki Kahani Bhi Ajeeb Hai"
  - "Mujhpe Bhi To Dalo Ek Nazar"
- Mahfil -
  - "Idhar Aao Pyare Kahi"
  - "Kiwadiya Laga Le"
  - "Looti Kaisi Mehfil"
- Mangalsutra -
  - "Raat Banu Main Aur Chand Bano Tum" with Bhupinder Singh
  - "Jawani Shararat Kare, Ude Aanchal Baaje Payal" with S. P. Balasubrahmanyam
- Meena Kumari Ki Amar Kahani - "Chhayi Chhayi Nazar Lag Gayi" with Lata Mangeshkar
- Mera Salaam -
  - "Mera Mehboob Hai"
  - "Uyi Tauba Tauba"
- Meri Aawaz Suno -
  - "Hay, Kya Soch Rahi Ho" with Kishore Kumar
  - "Mehmanon Ko Salaam Hai Mera" with Kishore Kumar
  - "Gudiya Ri Gudiya Tu Batla"
  - "Gudiya Ri Gudiya Tu Batla (Sad)"
  - "Tumhe Dekha Hai To Aisa Lagta"
  - "Achha Hua Tum Mil Gaye"
- Naag Devta -
  - "Chhaya Mein Aaj Teri Meri Pyaar"
  - "Jaaye Kahan Yeh Piya Ke Joganiya"
  - "Jhankar Paayal Ki Tose Binti Kare"
  - "Jai Jai Naag Devta" with Mahendra Kapoor
- Nakhuda - "Tujhe Maroongi Phoolon Ki Maar Sajna" with Mahendra Kapoor
- Naram Garam -
  - "Hame Rasto Ki Jarurat Nahi Hai"
  - "Mere Aangna Aaya Re Ghansham"
  - "Mere Chehre Mein Chhupa Hai"
- Naseeb - "Rang Jamake Jaayenge" with Usha Mangeshkar, Kishore Kumar, and Mohammed Rafi
- Paanch Qaidi -
  - "O Ripapa, O Ripapa"
  - "Meri Mummy Jaisi Koi Mummy Nahin Hai" with Chandrani Mukherjee
- Poonam -
  - "Mahiya Mera Mann Le Jiya"
  - "Haye O Rabba Nahin Lagta"
- Prem Geet -
  - "Tumne Kya Kya Kiya Hai Hamare Liye"
  - "Tere Geeton Ki Main Diwani"
  - "Dulhe Raja Aayenge"
- Professor Pyarelal -
  - "Aage Aage Ek Haseena"
  - "Ga Ga Ga Gaaye Jaa (version 2)"
  - "Dilwala Mastana"
  - "Tere Siwa Na Kisi Ka Banoonga" with Mohammed Rafi
  - "Yeh Vaada Raha Dilruba" with Mohammed Rafi
- Pyaasa Sawan - "O Meri Chhammak Chhallo" with Kishore Kumar
- Rocky -
  - "Aa Dekhe Zara" with Kishore Kumar
- Roohi - "Sajna Mujhe Roohi Keh Ke Bulaya"
- Saajan Ki Saheli -
  - "Nautak Maangta Ke Pau Ser Maangta"
- Sadka Kamliwaale Ka - "Mere Najariya Ka Maar"
- Sahhas -
  - "Saare Zamaane Mein"
  - "Kaali Kaali Aankhonwali" with Bappi Lahiri
- Sangdil -
  - "Sapne Tere Sach Ho Jahan Aa Door" with Mohammed Rafi
  - "Hai Kuchh Kuchh Hosh Bhi"
- Sanjh Ki Bela - "Yeh Dil Hai Teri Hi Nigaahon Ka Nishana"
- Sant Gyaneshwar -
  - "Prem Ki Boli Bol Tu Mukh Se"
- Shama -
  - "Hum Tum Dono Rahenge"
  - "Khushboo Ban Tohare"
  - "Ek Baar Sirf Ek Baar Tu Jo Muskura De (version 2)"
- Shakka - "Tera Woh Raasta, Mera Woh Raasta" with Mohammed Rafi
- Sharda -
  - "Aa Main Tujhko Pyaar Karoon"
- Shraddhanjali -
  - "Yun To Haseen Hazaro Najar Se Gujar Gaye" with Amit Kumar
  - "Hai Bada Natkhat Hai Bada Shaitan" with Amit Kumar
  - "Jana Kahan Jaoon Kahan"
  - "Jane Kyo Aisa Lagta Hai" with Bhupunder Singh
- Sweety -
  - "Aaj Akeli Main"
  - "Leke Dil Chala Gaya"
  - "Chhodo Na Kya Karte Ho" with Amit Kumar
  - "Aate Jaate Tujhe Dekha Tha" with Amit Kumar
  - "Aaiye Aur Paas"
- Tajurba - "Dil Chura Le Jo Mera" with Naseeruddin Shah
- Umrao Jaan[62] -
  - "Jab Chor Ban Jaaye Sipahiya"
  - "In Ankhon Ki Masti Ke"
  - "Jab Bhi Milti Hai"
  - "Justuju Jiski Thi"
  - "Yeh Kya Jagah Hai Doston"
- Waqt Ki Deewar -
  - "Jawani Ka Guzra Zamana" with Mohammed Rafi, and Manna Dey
  - "Mannchahi Ladki Kahin Koi Mil Jaaye" with Kishore Kumar
  - "Chal Cinema Dekhne Ko Jaaye Gori" with Kishore Kumar
  - "Khel Tamaashe Waali"
- Wardat - "Na Main Hoon Tera" with Bappi Lahiri
- Yeh Kaisa Nasha Hai -
  - "Dekh Ke Tera Roop" with Shailendra Singh
- Yeh Rishta Na Tootay -
  - "Main Khubsoorat Hoon, Har Dil Ki Zaroorat Hoon"

=== 1982 ===
- Aadat Se Majboor - "Tera Pyar Mila"
- Adhura Aadmi -
  - "Jaani Tum Haseen Ho"
  - "Husn Par Meri Nathmi Ka Ghera Hai"
- Aamne Samne -
  - "Oonchi Neechi Palki"
  - "Gale Mil Lo, O Deewanon"
- Angoor -
  - "Honthon Pe Beeti Baat Aayi Hai"
  - "Roz Roz Dali Dali"
- Anokha Bandhan -
  - "Ram Lakhan The Do Bhai"
  - "Ram Tumhi Ne Humko Diya Hai"
  - "Piya Tune Apne Rang Me Rang Diya Piya" with Shabbir Kumar
- Apna Bana Lo -
  - "Pani Me Aag Lagane"
  - "Apne Apne Miya Pe"
- Ashanti -
  - "Dil Diya Hai Maine Yaad Rakhna" with Amit Kumar
  - "Na Tujse Na Mujhse" with Kishore Kumar, and Shailendra Singh
  - "Lawangi Mirchi Main Kolhapur Ki" with Lata Mangeshkar
- Ayaash -
  - "Suno Balam Harjayi"
  - "Topi Wale Ne Karke Salaam"
- Baawri -
  - "Hey Ambike, Jagadambike, Hey Maa"
  - "Aai Karke Singhar Tohe Nindiya Laagi"
  - "Kahan Phansi Jaan"
- Badle Ki Aag -
  - "Yaar Mera Chikna Gadha" with Anand Bakshi
  - "Teri Mehfil Mein Hi Tujhko Woh Tamsha Dikhungi"
  - "Main Bewafa Nahin, Nazron Ne Na Utariye" with Mahendra Kapoor
- Baghawat -
  - "Mere Mehboob Tujhe Salaam" with Mohammed Rafi
  - "Duniya Se Dilwalon Se" with Mahendra Kapoor
  - "Ae Mere Deewane Dil"
- Barrister -
  - "Gora Gora Chhora" with Kishore Kumar
  - "Na Tum Bhoole Na Hum Bhoole" with Bhupinder Singh
  - "Masti Bhari Raat Hai"
  - "Aaya Rangeela Sawan"
  - "Suno Kahani Ek Ladke Ki"
- Bedard -
  - "Mere Baalon Ka Gajra Na Bole"
  - "Sapnon Ke Moti Bikhrate Nindiya"
- Begunaah Qaidi - "Main Toh Patnewali Hoon"
- Bezubaan -
  - "Yeh Mausam Hai Matwala" with Vinod Sehgal
  - "Gaaon Gakiyo, Phoolon Kaliyo" with Kishore Kumar
- Bheegi Palkein -
  - "Aadmi Ki Zindagi Ka Aurat Nasha Hai" with Mohammed Rafi
  - "Nainon Mein Sapne Samaye" with Amit Kumar
- Chalti Ka Naam Zindagi - "Yeh Mohabbat Kya Karenge" with Shankar Dasgupta, Kishore Kumar, Dilraj Kaur, and Anoop Kumar
- Chambal Ke Daku -
  - "Asha Ka Sooraj Dooba Hain"
  - "Ram Kasam Yeh Jawaani"
  - "Are Hardam Kam Zaroori" with Javed Khan
  - "Uljhan Ho, Chahe Koi Aa Jaaye Mushkil" with Mohammed Rafi, and Manna Dey
- Chorni - "Haye Yeh Kaisa Nasha"
- Daulat -
  - "Khoobsurat Ho Khoobsurat Ho" with Kishore Kumar
  - "Aaj Taron Me Chamak Phulo Me Rangat" with Suresh Wadkar
  - "Main Toh Hoon Shola Badan"
- Deedar-e-Yaar -
  - "Jana Jana Jaldi Kya Hai"
  - "Marne Ka Gham Nahi Hai"
  - "Eid Ka Din Hain" with Mohammed Rafi
- Desh Premee -
  - "Ari O Potti, Khaatun Ki Khidamat Mein" with Kishore Kumar
  - "Gore Nahi Hum Kale Sahi" with Laxmikant
- Dharam Kanta -
  - "Yeh Gotedar Lahenga" with Mohammed Rafi
  - "Tera Nam Liya Dil Tham Liya" with Mohammed Rafi
  - "Ghunghroo Toot Gaye"
  - "Teri Meri Hai Nazar Qatil Ki"
- Dial 100 -
  - "Koi Kunwara Mara Gaya" with Bappi Lahiri, and Manna Dey
  - "Aadhi Aadhi Raat Meri" with Kishore Kumar
  - "Nachoon Main Tu Sajh Utha" with Kishore Kumar
- Dil Hi Dil Mein - "Jiska Jawaab Nahin" with Mohammed Rafi
- Dil-e-Nadaan -
  - "Jab Prem Agan Lag Jaaye" with Suresh Wadkar
  - "Dil Tera Hai, Jaan Bhi Hai Teri Piya"
  - "Saji Sawaari Sej Ki"
- Dil... Akhir Dil Hai - "Chandan Ko Choom Choom Mast Hai Pawan"
- Do Dishayen -
  - "Main Tere Paas Hu" with Anwar
- Do Guru - "Kisi Ne Humse"
- Do Ustad -
  - "Meri Choli Pe Chameli"
  - "Us Raat Ki Subah"
  - "Ae Dil Tu Kya Jaane"
- Eent Ka Jawaab Patthar -
  - "Hum Darde Mohabbat Ki Dil Ko Na Saja Dete"
  - "Sau Baar Kaha Dil Ne"
- Ek Aur Sangram - "Shaadi Main Karoongi" with Suresh Wadkar
- Farz Aur Kanoon -
  - "Naujawan" with Kishore Kumar
  - "Mere Ghar Ka" with Kishore Kumar
  - "Jab Tak Pyar" with Shabbir Kumar
  - "Dil Ko Zara Sambhalo" with Shabbir Kumar, and Suresh Wadkar
- Geet Ganga -
  - "Mere Ghunghroo Kare Jo Jhankar" with Mahendra Kapoor
  - "Hum Roz Dulhan Ban Jate Hai"
  - "Le Gayo Re Daaka Daal Ke"
  - "Chanda Se Pyaari Dulhaniya"
- Gul-e-Bakavali - "Sarkar Aaiye, Tasreef Laiye" with Mohammed Rafi, Usha Mangeshkar, and Jaspal Singh
- Gumsoom -
  - "Ari O Paro" with Kishore Kumar
  - "Chhup Chhup Taake Saiyan"
- Hathkadi -
  - "Disco Station"
  - "Ek Baar Milke Jaye Nahi Dil Se" with Kishore Kumar
  - "Kabhi Tum Aag, Kabhi Tum Paani" with Kishore Kumar
  - "Jiyo Jiyo Pyare, Kya Thaath Hai Tumhare" with Kishore Kumar
- Heeron Ka Chor -
  - "Yeh Jawaani Hai Meri Jaan" with Mohammed Rafi
  - "Kuch Aise Aashiq" with Mohammed Rafi
  - "Chilman Se Nikal Kar Saamne Aa" with Aziz Nazan
- Insaan -
  - "Holi Mein Haule Haule Dil Dole" with Mohammed Rafi, and Shailendra Singh
  - "Saathiya Tu Mere Sapnon Ka Meet Hai" with Mohammed Rafi
  - "Pee Li Thodi Bhang, Tabiyat Huyi Malang" with Mohammed Rafi
  - "Raja Mori Baali Umar"
- Jaanwar - "Yeh Kaisa Nasha Sa Chhane Laga" with Kishore Kumar
- Jawalaa Dahej Ki -
  - "Mana Safar Hai Mushkil Manzil Bhi Door Hai" with Kishore Kumar
  - "Mai Hoon Kali Nadaan" with Usha Mangeshkar
  - "Mile Ho Aaj To Hamse Nazar"
  - "Mori Daihya Balam Ki Zamindari"
  - "Saiyan Teri Godi Mein"
- Jeeo Aur Jeene Do -
  - "Hathapai Na Karo"
  - "Bulbula Pani Ka"
  - "Kurta Malmal Ka" with Suresh Wadkar
- Jeevan Dhaara - "Samay Ke Darpan Mein" with Suresh Wadkar
- Jogi -
  - "Gehri Taliya Hai Naina Hamaar"
  - "Tune To Jogi Jog Liya"
  - "Ek Bhuli Yad Ne Phir Dil Mera Tadpa Diya"
  - "Ab Mujhe Chand Sitaron Ki Zarurat Nahi" with Mohammed Rafi
- Johnny I Love You -
  - "Rang Rangila Hai Yeh"
  - "Aage Aage Dulha Chale" with Kishore Kumar
- Kachche Heere -
  - "Mere Jhumke Ke"
  - "Chadhi Jawaani"
- Kasam Durga Ki - "Jee Kardai Mai Dig Paoon Dharam"
- Keh Do Pyaar Hai -
  - "Milte Hain Sab Se"
- Khush Naseeb -
  - "O Sajna (version 1)"
  - "O Sajna (version 2)"
  - "Baar Baar Log Mujhe Poochhe" with Amit Kumar
- Lakshmi -
  - "Kora Man Kori Kaya" with Amit Kumar
  - "Kabhi Dekhe Khushiyaan Kabhi"
  - "Haalat Se Ladna Mushkil Tha"
  - "Shaam Peene Ki Phir"
  - "Kya Baat Hai" with Mahendra Kapoor
- Log Kya Kahenge - "Aap Kyun Udaas Hain"
- Lubna -
  - "Mubarakbaad Bismillah, Meri Banno Ban Gayi Dulhan"
- Mehndi Rang Layegi -
  - "Aankh Milti Hai To" with Kishore Kumar
  - "Heer Sohni Shirin Laila"
- Main Intaquam Loonga -
  - "Mujhe Na Bulaya Karo" with Kishore Kumar
  - "Is Sapnon Ki Shehzadi Ko" with Shabbir Kumar
- Meharbani - "Mat Poochh Ke Kis Ki Aashiq Hain" with Mohammed Rafi
- Namak Halaal -
  - "Aaj Rapat Jaayen To" with Kishore Kumar
  - "Raat Baki, Baat Baki" with Bappi Lahiri, and Shashi Kapoor
  - "Jawani Janeman Haseen Dilruba"
- Namkeen -
  - "Anki Chali Main Banki Chali"
  - "Badi Der Se Megha Barsa"
  - "Phir Se Aaiyo, Badra Bidesi" with R D Burman
- Naya Safar -
  - "Ke Dekho Aaye Humare Mehman"
  - "Jai Shiv Shankar"
  - "Jane Kyu Log Mujhe Baar Baar" with Usha Mangeshkar
- Nikaah - "Chehra Chhupa Liya Hai Kisi Ne Hijab Mein" with Mahendra Kapoor, and Salma Agha
- Patthar Ki Lakeer -
  - "Hum Woh Badal Hai"
  - "Kis Thane Mein Rapat Likhwaoon"
  - "Chhota Sa Yeh Mera Ghar (female)"
- Pyaar Mein Sauda Nahin - "Humko Toh Pyaar Ho Gaya Hai"
- Raaj Mahal -
  - "Tere Dil Se Teri Mehfil Se" with Hemlata
  - "Aayi Hai Pyar Ki Bahar"
- Raakh Aur Chingari -
  - "Gora Mukhda"
  - "Itni Wafa To"
- Raaste Pyar Ke -
  - "Saara Din Satate Ho" with Kishore Kumar
  - "Gokul Ki Galiyon Ka Gwala" with Kishore Kumar, and Usha Mangeshkar
  - "Kisi Ne Prem Ka Amrit Chakha" with Lata Mangeshkar, and Usha Mangeshkar
- Raja Jogi -
  - "Jogi Re Jogi" with Usha Mangeshkar
  - "Mera Maheka Badan"
  - "Tu Ang Laga Ja"
- Rajput - "Bhagi Re Bhagi Re Bhagi Brijbala" with Mahendra Kapoor, and Dhiraj Kaur
- Raksha -
  - "Mil Gaye, Dil Mil Gaye, Phool Banke Khil Gaye" with Kishore Kumar
  - "Naye Purane Saal Mein Ek Raat Baki Hai" with Kishore Kumar
  - "Main Chalta Hoon, Mujhe Jane Do" with Mohammed Rafi
  - "Jani Dilbar Jani"
- Rustom - "Mujhko Pasand Hai Tu"
- Samraat -
  - "Dil Se Duniya Ke Darr Ko Nikal De" with Kishore Kumar
  - "Ladki Haseen Ho Ladka Naujawaan Ho" with Kishore Kumar
  - "Meri Jaan Tujhe Mere Hatho Marna"
  - "Panja Chhaka Phir Satta" with Kishore Kumar, and Shailendra Singh
- Sanam Teri Kasam -
  - "Jaan-E-Jaan, O Meri Jaan-E-Jaan" with R D Burman
  - "Kitna Bhi Tu Kar Le Sitam (female)"
  - "Kitna Bhi Tu Kar Le Sitam (duet)" with Kishore Kumar
- Satte Pe Satta -
  - "Dukki Pe Dukki Ho" with Bhupinder Singh, Sapan Chakraborty, Kishore Kumar, and R D Burman
  - "Jhuka Ke Sar Ko Poochho" with Sapan Chakraborty
  - "Mausam Mastana" with Dilraj Kaur
- Sawaal -
  - "Sab Ki Nigaah Mein Sawwaal Hai"
  - "Dilruba Hoon Dilruba"
  - "Maana Churaoge Badan" with Kishore Kumar
- Shaukeen -
  - "Ye Range Mehfil"
  - "Suhani Shaam Aayi Hai"
- Shiv Charan - "Meri Hai Jawani"
- Sister -
  - "Na Tooti Koi Khidki Vidki (version 1)"
  - "Na Tooti Koi Khidki Vidki (version 2)"
- Sitam -
  - "Saans Leti Hui (version 1)"
  - "Saans Leti Hui (version 2)"
  - "Kaun Gali Se Nikloo (female)"
- Sugandh -
  - "Sajan Tere Pyar Mein"
  - "Su Su Su Suhani Raat"
  - "Din Bhi Khile Khile" with S. P. Balasubrahmanyam
  - "Tu Agre Ka Launda" with S. P. Balasubrahmanyam
- Sumbandh -
  - "Diwane Mera Jo Hain Sawal" with Bappi Lahiri
  - "Raat Ko Mere Kamre Mein" with Bappi Lahiri
  - "Paas Aao Naa"
- Suraag -
  - "Mera Dil Liye Jaa"
  - "Woh Nazar Leke" with Mohammed Rafi
- Swami Dada -
  - "Patakha Phooljhadi"
  - "Zindagi Yeh Kaisi Hai, Jaise Jeeyo Waisi Hai" with Kishore Kumar, and Amit Kumar
  - "Ek Roop Kai Naam, Man Mandir Tera Dhaam" with Kishore Kumar
- Taaqat -
  - "Sapnon Mein Toh Dekha Tumko"
  - "Ikkad Dukkad Bamba Bo"
- Taqdeer Ka Badshah - "Pyaar Ka Hai Match Sanam" with Bappi Lahiri
- Teesri Aankh -
  - "Superman" with Kishore Kumar
- Teri Maang Sitaron Se Bhar Doon - "Ae Pardanasheen" with Manna Dey
- Ustadi Ustad Se -
  - "Saathi Tere Naam (version 1)" with Usha Mangeshkar
  - "Saathi Tere Naam (version 2)" with Bhupinder Singh
  - "Tumsa Nahin Mila" with Amit Kumar
  - "Rehmatullah Mashallah" with Mohammed Rafi
  - "Ustadi Ustad Se" with Mohammed Rafi, and Manna Dey
- Vakil Babu -
  - "Aa Gayi Jawani Phir Kya Hua"
  - "Ae Musafiro Naye Safar Ki Tyari Karo"
- Vidhaata -
  - "Pyaar Ka Imtihaan"
  - "Uri Baba"
- Waqt Waqt Ki Baat -
  - "Oh Meherbaan Ye Mera Dil Kisi Gahne Ka Phool Nahi"
  - "Ko Hi Toh Woh Haq Hai Ke Jo Tu Chahe" with Kishore Kumar
- Yeh Nazdeekiyan -
  - "Kitni Haseen Hai Ye Nashili"
  - "Dil Dil Dil"
- Yeh To Kamaal Ho Gaya -
  - "Yeh Duniya Ghum Rahi Hai" with S. P. Balasubrahmanyam
  - "Main Awara Banjara" with S. P. Balasubrahmanyam
- Yeh Vaada Raha -
  - "Tu Tu Hai Wahi" with Kishore Kumar
  - "Maine Tujhe Kabhie Kuch Kaha Tha" with Kishore Kumar
  - "Ishq Mera Bandagi Hai" with Kishore Kumar
  - "Jeene Ko Toh Jite Hain Sabhi" with Kishore Kumar
  - "Mil Gayi Aaj Do Lehre"
- Zamaane Ko Dikhana Hai -
  - "Puchho Naa Yaar Kyaa Hua" with Mohammed Rafi, Rishi Kapoor, and Padmini Kolhapure
  - "Kya Ishq Ne Samjha Hai" with Rishi Kapoor, and Shailendra Singh
  - "Bolo Bolo Kuch To Bolo" with Mohammed Rafi

=== 1983 ===
- Ab Meri Baari - "Socha Na Hum Tumhein" with Lata Mangeshkar, Mohammed Rafi, and Kishore Kumar
- Achha Bura -
  - "Aa Jaao Yahaan"
  - "Kya Aisa Ho Sa" with Suresh Wadkar
- Agar Tum Na Hote -
  - "Dheere Dheere Zara Zara"
  - "Hum Toh Hai Chhui Mui"
- Andhaa Kaanoon -
  - "Meri Bahena" with Kishore Kumar
  - "Ek Taraf Hum Tum, Ek Taraf Sare" with S. P. Balasubrahmanyam
  - "Mausam Ka Taqaaza Hai" with S. P. Balasubrahmanyam
  - "Kabhi Na Kabhi"
- Atyachar - "Chhed Kaahe Kare, Baith Haath Ke Pare"
- Avtaar -
  - "Chalo, Bulaawa Aaya Hai" with Mahendra Kapoor, and Narendra Chanchal
- Bandhan Kuchchey Dhaagon Ka -
  - "Hands Up Jaani Hands Up" with Usha Uthup, and Suresh Wadkar
  - "Piya Tohe Laaj Nahi Aave" with Kishore Kumar
- Bekaraar -
  - "Siya Pati Ramchandra Ke Jai"
  - "Gadi Chhuk Chhuk Chalti Hai"
  - "Tum Chale Aaye Ho" with Kishore Kumar
  - "Maine Yeh Faisala Kar Liya" with Kishore Kumar
- Bekhabar -
  - "Kal Raat Darwaze"
  - "Are Logon Pakdo"
- Beta -
  - "Mere Mathe Pe"
  - "Saawan Ke Jhoole" with Mahendra Kapoor
- Bura Aadmi - "Raaste Mein Ek Ladki Mili" with Bappi Lahiri
- Chatpati -
  - "Holi Ke Din Aai Aai Re Holi" with Suresh Wadkar
  - "Hai Raat Pyasi"
  - "Mai Hu Madam Chatpati"
  - "Maine Nahi Pee"
  - "Naye Berukhi"
- Chor Police -
  - "Meri Jawani Hai Chandi Sona"
  - "Aaj Mera Dil Jhoom Jhoom"
  - "Atkan Batkan Dahi Chatakan Chu Chu Bho Bho Meow" with Vinod Sehgal
  - "Tum Kaho Aur Hum Sune, Hum Kahe, Tum Suno" with Suresh Wadkar, Manna Dey, and Vanita Mishra
- Coolie -
  - "Mujhe Peene Ka Shauk Nahi" with Shabbir Kumar
  - "Humko Isaq Huwa Hai Yaaro" with Shabbir Kumar
  - "Dono Jawani Ke Masti Mein Chur" with Shabbir Kumar
- Daulat Ke Dushman -
  - "Bichhua Bane Piya Tere Nain"
  - "Hum Toh Hain Sabke Yaar" with Kishore Kumar
- Dharti Aakash -
  - "Mujhe Kuchh"
  - "Rut Hai" with Mahendra Kapoor
- Dhat Tere... Ki - "Is Waqt Ke Paon Mein Kaanta Hai" with Ashok Shukla
- Do Gulab -
  - "Pyara Pyara Laage Mitha Mitha Lage"
  - "Mere Liye Tu Bani" with Kishore Kumar
  - "Come Near Aaiye Na" with Kishore Kumar
  - "Jab Do Dil Takrayege" with Kishore Kumar
- Do Shabd - "Do Dilon Ka Saathiya Rishta" with Kishore Kumar
- Door-Desh -
  - "Yaaron Mere Yaar Se Milo"
- Doosri Dulhan -
  - "Mera Saiyan"
  - "Khila Khila Mukhda (version 1)"
  - "Khila Khila Mukhda(version 2)"
  - "Khel Khel Kar Kulel Nandaji Ka Lala (duet version 1)" with Bappi Lahiri
  - "Khel Khel Kar Kulel Nandaji Ka Lala (duet version 2)" with Bappi Lahiri
- Ek Baar Chale Aao -
  - "Chirmi Babul Ki Ladli (Part 1)"
  - "Chirmi Babul Ki Ladli (Part 1)"
  - "Ek Baar Chale Aao"
  - "Chadhti Jawani Meri Sanam, Kar Le Pyar Tu Meri Kasam"
  - "Main Hoon Tere Liye (Duet)" with Nitin Mukesh
- Ek Din Bahu Ka -
  - "Hum Tum Juda Na Hinge" with Suresh Wadkar
  - "Ek Jaan Hain Hum" with Kavita Arun
- Ek Jaan Hain Hum -
  - "Dil Dil Hai Koi Shisha To Nahi" with Shabbir Kumar
  - "Aasmaan Pe Likh Doon" with Shabbir Kumar
  - "Dil Lagana Tum Kya Jano" with Kishore Kumar
- Faraib -
  - "Shor Macha Hat" with Kishore Kumar
  - "Yeh Mausam Pyaar Ka" with Kishore Kumar
- Film Hi Film -
  - "Kitna Rangeen Hai Yeh Chand Sitaron Ka Sama" with Mohammed Rafi
  - "Aadmi Ko Jeena Hai"
  - "Idhar To Dekho"
- Ganga Meri Maa -
  - "Main Pyar Ki Kitaab Hoon"
  - "Dil Aap Ko Jabse Diya Hai"
  - "Andaz Tere Pyar Ka Haay Kitna Nirala"
  - "Yaar Mil Gaya To Khuda Mil Gaya" with Mohammed Rafi, and Manna Dey
- Ghungroo -
  - "Yen Jashn E Mohabbat, Tohafa Qubul Hai"
  - "Tum Salamat Raho"
- Gumnaam Hai Koi -
  - "Assalam Alaikum" with Usha Mangeshkar
  - "Chaka Chak Chaka Chak" with Bhupinder Singh
  - "Jo Aaya Hai Woh Aayega"
  - "Dil Ke Zakhmon Pe Dawa"
  - "Na Chauwanni, Na Athanni, Na Rupaiya"
  - "Sapne Jhimil"
- Himmatwala -
  - "Wah Wah Wah, Khel Shuru Ho Gaya" with Kishore Kumar
  - "Ladki Nahin Hai Tu" with Kishore Kumar
  - "Taki O Taki" with Kishore Kumar
- Hum Se Hai Zamana -
  - "Tere Naam Ki Deewani"
  - "Gustakhi Maaf Ho, Ae Jaan-E-Jahan" with Kishore Kumar
  - "Tainu Mainu Vekhe Zamana, Tu Jo Sadda Yaar Ho Gaya" with Amit Kumar
- Humse Na Jeeta Koi -
  - "Gum Sum Gum Sum Kyun Rehate Ho"
  - "Kholake Rakhana Darwaaja" with Kishore Kumar
- Jaani Dost -
  - "Jawani Jawani Jalti Jawani" with Kishore Kumar
  - "Aayee Aayee Mai Toh Aayi Jannat Chhupa Ke" with Kishore Kumar
  - "Jeevan Bana Jeevan Mil Gaya Tera Daman" with Kishore Kumar
  - "Ham Nahin Jhumte Hain, Jhumta Hai Saara Jahaan" with Kishore Kumar
  - "Bagon Ki Tu Rani Hai" with Kishore Kumar
- Jeena Hai Pyaar Mein - "Jeena Hai Pyaar Mein" with Kishore Kumar
- Jeet Hamari -
  - "Tumko Agar Hai Pyar" with S. P. Balasubrahmanyam
- Justice Chaudhary -
  - "Maine Tujhe Chhuwa Toh Tan Jala" with Kishore Kumar
  - "Lakshmi O Lakshmi Ghar Ki Tu Lakshmi" with Kishore Kumar
  - "Mama Miya Pom Pom" with Kishore Kumar
  - "Saath Mere Aaogi" with Kishore Kumar
- Karate -
  - "Yeh Salaam Aakhri"
  - "Baazi Pyar Ki"
- Kaun? Kaisey? -
  - "Main Bhi Joon Yahaan"
  - "Kyun Kaise Hua?"
  - "Aayega Mera Sapnon Ka Raja"
- Khushi -
  - "Tumne Likha Mujhe Jo Pyara Khat" with Amit Kumar
  - "Aao Mere Saath Aao" with Harihar
  - "Chalo Zindagi Ko Naya Mod Do"
- Kissi Se Na Kehna -
  - "Dhundhe Jashodaa Chahu"
  - "Kissi Se Na Kahana"
  - "Phoolon Tumhe Pata Hai Man Kyo Khila Khila Hai"
  - "Tum Jab Se Jivan Mein Kushboo Ki Tarah Chhaye"
  - "Kaahe Jhatke Itne Maare Nagin" with Bappi Lahiri
- Lal Chunariya - "Jise Jalwon Ki Zaroorat Ho Woh"
- Love in Goa -
  - "Ek Ladka, Ek Ladki Se Jab Milta Hai" with Amit Kumar
  - "Na Jane Tune Kya Kaha(happy)" with Amit Kumar
  - "Na Jane Tune Kya Kaha (sad)" with Amit Kumar
- Mahaan -
  - "Yeh Din Toh Aata Hai" with R D Burman
  - "Pyaar Mein Dil Pe Maar De Goli" with Kishore Kumar
- Main Awara Hoon -
  - "Pyar Kise Kehte Hai, Pyar Ise Kehte Hai" with Kishore Kumar
  - "Yahi To Mohabbat Hai"
- Mandi -
  - "Zabaane Badalte Hain, Har Aan Kubaan"
  - "Chubti Hai Yeh To Nigodi Chubti Hai"
  - "Alaap In Raga Malhar"
  - "Alaap In Raga Todi"
  - "Ishq Ke Sholay Bhadkao"
- Mangal Pandey -
  - "Aate Ho Jaate Ho"
  - "Mohabbat Na Hoti"
- Mazdoor -
  - "Naach Uthi"
  - "Tumhe Bhool Jaane Ka Haq Hai"
  - "Baat Adhoori Kyun Hai"
- Mehndi -
  - "Mere Angna Mehndi Ka Boota"
  - "Bus Ek Tabassum"
  - "Jeena Seekh Liya"
  - "Mere Aangna Mehndi (Sad)"
  - "Boliya Bhangra Mahiya Tappe" with Mahendra Kapoor
- Mujhe Insaaf Chahiye -
  - "Nahin Main Woh (version 1)"
  - "Nahin Main Woh (version 2)"
  - "I Love You, Do You Love Me?" with Shailendra Singh
  - "Premdoot Aaya, Prem Sandesha Laya" with Abhijeet
- Mujhe Vachan Do -
  - "Tumhare Oopar" with Kishore Kumar
  - "Aap Ki Khidmat Mein" with Kishore Kumar
- Nastik -
  - "Main Hoon Tere Saamne"
  - "Pyare Tere Pyar Mein Lut Gaye Hum" with Amit Kumar
- Naukar Biwi Ka -
  - "Main Nahin Doon" with Bappi Lahiri
  - "Kya Naam Hai Tera" with Kishore Kumar
  - "Yaar Mila" with Kishore Kumar
  - "O Mere Sajna"
- Nishan - "Sun Sun Sun Meri Jaan" with Kishore Kumar
- Nikamma -
  - "Tere Bina Main Kuchh Nahin" with Kishore Kumar
- Pehredaar -
  - "Aha Mujhe Dard Uthe" with Kishore Kumar
  - "Neel Gagan Ke Panchhi Re"
- Prem Tapasya -
  - "Devi Kuch To Bol" with Kishore Kumar
  - "Mere Chand Ko Chand Ne Dekha" with Kishore Kumar
  - "Raqqasa Raqs Kar" with Kishore Kumar
- Pukar -
  - "Bachke Rehna Re Baba" with Kishore Kumar, and R D Burman
  - "Main Tere Liye, Tu Mere Liye"
  - "Marenge Ya Mar Jayenge" with R D Burman
- Pyaar Bina Jag Soona -
  - "dildaaron Dilwaalon" with Abhijeet Bhattacharya
  - "Shama Jalne Do"
  - "Jhumka Kho Gaya"
- Pyaas -
  - "Om Namah Shivay (female)"
  - "Mera Dil Tera Dil"
  - "Raat Sone Ko Hai"
- Pyaasi Aankhen - "Raat Aandhi Ho Gayi Baaje Paune Do" with Kishore Kumar
- Qayamat -
  - "Aaj Qayamat Ho Gayi"
  - "Poochho Nahin Dil Mera"
  - "Ek Aankh To Maare Dank"
  - "Udhar Se Jo Phursat Mile"
- Raaste Aur Rishte - "Aap Aaye Toh Tashrif Laaye"
- Razia Sultan -
  - "Hariyala Banna Aaya Re" with Jagjit Kaur
- Rishta Kagaz Ka - "Kya Ho Gaya Mujhe Poochho Na Jaanejaan" with Kishore Kumar
- Romance -
  - "Love Love Love" with Manna Dey, and Chandrashekhar Gadgil
- Sadma -
  - "O Babua, Yeh Mahua"
  - "Yeh Hawaa, Yey Fiza" with Suresh Wadkar
- Salam-e-Mohabbat -
  - "Jane Kyun Aap Mohabbat Ko" with Aziz Nazan
  - "Al-Madad Ehmada-e-Mukhtar"
  - "Ghungroo Tootenge Mehfil"
- Sampark - "Koi Pehna Gaya Pyaar Se, Pyaar Ki Nishaani"
- Sansani -
  - "Saqiya Tu Koi" with Varsha Bhosle
  - "Ab Kahan Jaayenge Hum" with Amit Kumar, Bhupinder Singh, and Varsha Bhosle
  - "Patthar Ka Hain Sanam" with Amit Kumar
  - "Phir Teri Yaad Aa Gaye"
  - "Sansanikhez Koi Baat" with Hemant Bhosle
- Shubh Kaamna -
  - "Baghon Mein Khile Hai" with S. P. Balasubrahmanyam
  - "Is Dil Ne Socha Hai Jo" with S. P. Balasubrahmanyam
  - "Tumko Hai Pyar Mana" with S. P. Balasubrahmanyam
- Souten - "Jab Apne Ho Jaaye Bewafa"
- Sweekar Kiya Maine -
  - "Kamai Toh Bahut Phir Bhi" with Kishore Kumar
- Talabandi - "Mera Jalwa Meri Mehfil"
- Taqdeer -
  - "Aisa Waisa Koi Mujhe (version 1)"
  - "Aisa Waisa Koi Mujhe (version 2)"
  - "Main Mastani Diljani"
- Vijeta -
- Woh Saat Din - "Anari Ka Khelna Khel Ka Satiyanas"
- Woh Jo Hasina -
  - "Zora Zori" with Amit Kumar
  - "Kab Ke Bichhde"
- Zakhmi Dil - "Raah Mushkil Mod Anjaane"
- Zara Si Zindagi -
  - "Tana Dim, Tana Dim (Duet)" with S. P. Balasubrahmanyam

=== 1984 ===
- Aan Aur Shaan -
  - "Ganga Ban Jaaun Kaho" with Mohammed Rafi
  - "Sherni Bahu Hai Mera Yaar" with Kishore Kumar
- Aaj Ka M.L.A. Ram Avtar -
  - "Tukur Tukur Dekha Karoon" with Kishore Kumar
  - "Jaago Re Jaago, Shuru Ho Gayi Hai Aaj Jung Hamari" with Mahendra Kapoor
  - "Woh Jo Bichhde Hai"
- Aakhir -
  - "Bahut Pila Di Hai"
  - "Palla Tori Palla"
  - "Tere Dil Mein Mujhe Rehna Hai" with Suresh Wadkar
- Aasmaan -
  - "Jo Mere Kareeb Aayega, Jaan Jahan Se Jaayega" with Kishore Kumar
  - "Tere Nain Hai Kaise, Mujhe Dekh Na Aise" with Kishore Kumar
  - "Baghon Mein Lagiya Ambiya" with Rajeev Kapoor
- Ab Ayega Mazaa -
  - "Solah Baras Ki Kamsin Umariya" with Kishore Kumar
  - "Kab Jaane Anjaane" with Kishore Kumar
- Akalmand -
  - "Madrasi Ladki Ya Punjabi Ladke Se"
  - "Nazar Dekho"
  - "I Love You" with Kishore Kumar
- All Rounder - "Hum Kaun Hain" with Suresh Wadkar
- Amar Jyoti -
  - "Janam Janam Ka Naata"
  - "Kaare Kajre Badra" with Hariharan
- Anand Aur Anand - "Waadon Ki Shaam Aayi" with Kishore Kumar, and Abhijeet Bhattacharya
- Andar Bahaar -
  - "Mausam Bada Suhana Hai, Achha Ji" with Shailendra Singh
  - "Kaise Kaise Hai Mere Meherbaan"
  - "Meri Aankhon Mein Zaraa Jhaanko To"
- Awaaz -
  - "Zindagi Sau Baras Ki" with Kishore Kumar
  - "Bolo Pyar Karogi" with Kishore Kumar
  - "Ankhon Ki Zuban Ne" with Kishore Kumar
  - "Zindagi Awaaz Deti Hai"
- Asha Jyoti -
  - "Mehboob Se Mehbooba Mil Gayi" with Kishore Kumar
  - "Chikna Chikna, Yaar Mera"
  - "Aayi Milan Ki Woh (Happy)"
  - "Aayi Milan Ki Woh (Sad)"
- Baazi -
  - "Kaise Pyar Hota Hai"
  - "Noora De De" with Kishore Kumar
  - "Gupchup Hai Mummy Gumsum Hai Daddy" with Kishore Kumar, Shivangi Kolhapure, and Baby Rajeshwari
  - "Thodi Si Khusi Hai, Thoda Sa Hai" with Shabbir Kumar, Shivangi Kolhapure, and Baby Rajeshwari
  - "Sehari Babu Hai Mera Yaar" with Kishore Kumar
- Bad Aur Badnaam -
- Bandh Honth - "Awara Sadiyon Se"
- Bhatakte Kadam -
  - "Suroor Shaam Ka, Nasha Jaam Ka" with Mohammed Aziz
  - "Arey Re Re Re Mil Gaya"
- Bhatke Rahee -
  - "Mere Sajna Main Tujhe Haal-e-Dil Kya Sunaoon"
  - "Duniya Ne Kiya Majboor"
- Bhavna -
  - "Paheli Chhoti Si" with Kavita Paudwal, Vanita Mishra, and Gurpreet Kaur
  - "Dekho Din Ye Na Dhalne Paye" with Kavita Paudwal
- Bhemaa -
  - "Deewane Kya Hai"
  - "Gori Gori Titli Main"
  - "Jhoom Bindiya, Jhoom Kajra"
  - "Maanungi Na Teri Manmaani"
- Bindiya Chamkegi -
  - "Phansai Liyo Re Hamen"
  - "Baj Gayi Ghanti"
- Boxer - "Tere Dil Mein Bhi Kya Kuchh Kuchh Hoti Hai" with Kishore Kumar
- Captain Barry -
  - "Jab Saath Aa Gaye Ho"
  - "Raja Ji Ne Dekha"
  - "Teru Meri Ek Zindagi" with Anwar
- Chakma -
  - "Toh Tumne Bhi Pee Li"
  - "Yaaron Ki Mehfil"
- Dharm Aur Qanoon -
  - "Dil Se Dil Ki Baat Hogayi" with Kishore Kumar
  - "Aashiq Hun Tumhara" with Shailendra Singh
- Dhokhebaaz -
  - "Hey Tera Mukhda Bada Salona" with Mohammed Rafi
  - "Hun Tujhko Pilane Aaye Hain" with Mohammed Rafi, and Mahendra Kapoor
- Dilawar -
  - "Ek Ladke Ne Kahi" with Kishore Kumar
  - "Toot Gayi Choodiya"
  - "Bachke Rahna Ae"
  - "Jab Jab Aaye" with Hariharan
- Divorce -
  - "Woh Mera Mehboob" with Suresh Wadkar
  - "Taxiwale Meter Gira" with Suresh Wadkar
  - "Tumse Bichad Ke Kaise Jiyenge"
  - "Humein Diya Hai Aapne Dhokha"
  - "Dheere Dheere Bolo" with K. J. Yesudas
- Duniya - "Jhumti Raat Jawan, Jagmagata Hai Jahan" with Kishore Kumar, and Mahendra Kapoor
- Ek Nai Paheli -
  - "Kuchh Na Kuchh Zaroor Hai"
- Gangvaa -
  - "O Jaanam Jaanam Jaanam"
  - "Angaara Hoon Main, Tu Komal Kali, Kyun Tu Mujhe Pyar Karne Chali" with Kishore Kumar
  - "Tan Ke Khadi Hai, Kya Phooljhadi Hai" with Bappi Lahiri
- Ghar Ek Mandir - "Kab Se Khada Main Tere Liye" with Kishore Kumar
- Haisiyat -
  - "Uttar Mein Dekhoon To Surat Teri" with Kishore Kumar
  - "Daftar Ko Der Ho Gayi" with Kishore Kumar
- Hip Hip Hurray -
  - "Jab Kabhi Mud Ke Dekhta Hoon" with Bhupinder Singh
  - "Hip Hip Hip Hurray Ho" with Shailendra Singh, and Udit Narayan
- Hum Do Hamare Do -
  - "Kisi Bedard Ko Hum Pyaar Ke Kabil Samajh Baithe"
  - "Paise Ki Jhankaar Pe Jawaani Nache Jhoom Ke"
  - "Lehrata Mausam Aaya Sajna" with Mahendra Kapoor
- Hum Hain Lajawab - "Dilbar Diljani" with Kishore Kumar
- Hum Rahe Na Hum -
  - "Roshan Roshan Raatein Apni" with Kishore Kumar
- Hum Se Mile Tum -
  - "Hum Se Mile Tum" with Shabbir Kumar
  - "Hum Se Mile Tum (sad)" with Shabbir Kumar
  - "Dheere Dheere Dheere Bol" with Shabbir Kumar
  - "Tu Mere Maina" with Shabbir Kumar
  - "Aayi Teri Yaad Aayi" with Shabbir Kumar
  - "Sawan Aayo Re" with Shabbir Kumar
- Humdam -
  - "Dilwalon Ki Is Duniya Mein" with Minoo Purushottam, Suresh Wadkar, and Mahendra Kapoor
  - "Do Hai Kunware Ladke" with Minoo Purushottam, Suresh Wadkar, and Mahendra Kapoor
  - "Is Ko Ya Us Ko"
- Inquilaab -
  - "Aaj Abhi Yahin, Nahin Nahin Nahin" with Kishore Kumar
  - "Sare Badan Mein Zahar Chad Gaya" with Kishore Kumar
- Inteha -
  - "Loot Gayi Main Toh Loot Gayi Saiyan"
  - "Duniya Yeh Duniya"
- Jaag Utha Insan -
  - "Tere Zindagi Ki Raagini Par" with Kishore Kumar
  - "Aayi Parvaton Pe Jhoomti Ghata" with Kishore Kumar
  - "Morni Ne Seekha Humse Hi"
- Jagir -
  - "Aaj Ki Raat"
  - "Sach Kahta Hai" with Kishore Kumar
  - "Sabko Salam Karte Hain" with R D Burman
- Jawaani -
  - "Bheega Bheega Pyara Pyara" with Amit Kumar
  - "Tu Rootha Toh Main Ro Doongi Sanam" with Amit Kumar
- Jeene Nahin Doonga -
  - "Yaad Rakhna Sajna"
  - "Tera Guroor Tukde Tukde Hua"
  - "Hum Bhi Na Mane Tum Bhi Na Mane" with Shabbir Kumar
  - "Gali Gali Me Baat Chali" with Usha Mangeshkar
- Jhutha Sach -
  - "Kisi Ko Khona, Kisi Ko Pana" with Kishore Kumar, Preeti Sagar, and Priya Mayekar
  - "Jahan Bin Hawa Ke Parda Hile"
  - "Kya Karoon Main To Nikli"
  - "Loot Gayi Main To Aaj"
- Kaamyab -
  - "Ek Baar Dekha To" with Kishore Kumar
  - "Dhakkam Dhakka Hua" with Kishore Kumar
  - "Ek Number Ka Ladka" with Kishore Kumar
  - "Chhoti Chhoti Dikhti Thi" with Kishore Kumar
- Kahan Tak Aasmaan Hai -
  - "Mujhe Seene Se Laga Lo"
  - "Zulfon Ki Ghatayen Tere Liye"
  - "Cham Cham Chikara Hay"
- Kanoon Meri Mutthi Mein -
  - "Aate Hi Kahte Ho, Jana Hai Jaldi Hay"
  - "Ingali Mungali Khaike"
- Karishmaa -
  - "Ek Haseen Lakhon Mein, Uske Lakhon Deewane" with Kavita Krishnamurthy
  - "Teri Nazar Se Meri Nazar Ka Rishta Bada Purana" with Kishore Kumar
  - "Khol Doongi Dil Ka Tala" with Kishore Kumar
- Kiski Biwi - "Jab Hum Huzoor Aap Ke"
- Kunwari Bahu -
  - "Are Launda Badnam Hua Laundiya Tere Liye"
  - "Yeh Jab Ki Baat Hai, Tum Hi Na The Nigahon Mein"
- Laila - "Bekhabar Thi Main Apni Jawaani Se"
- Lorie -
  - "Tumhi Se Roshan Hai Raat" with Talat Aziz
  - "Gudiya, Chidiya, Chand, Chakori" with Pamela Chopra, and Jagjit Kaur
- Maang Saja Do Meri -
  - "Aaj Ki Yeh Ladkiyan" with Suresh Wadkar
  - "Na Chhupa Tu Raaz Humse"
- Maati Maangey Khoon - "Mere Ghungroo Mujhe De Do"
- Mahadaan -
  - "Aankhen Dikhana Raja Jani"
  - "Udta Hua Ek Panchhi"
  - "Udta Hua Ek Panchhi (sad)"
  - "Mera Dil Chala Chalen"
  - "Jaata Jogu De Gaya Khushiyon Ka Mala"
  - "Kuchh Din Pehle Ki Baat Hai"
  - "O Meri Jeevan Sangini" with Amit Khanna
- Maqsad -
  - "Pyaar Tumne Kiya Na" with Kishore Kumar
  - "Garmi Hain Kahan Hain" with Kishore Kumar
  - "Lachari Ko Majburi Ko"
  - "Lachari Ko Majburi Ko (Sad)"
- Manzil Manzil -
  - "O Meri Jaanejaan, Ab Nahin Rehna Tere Bina" with Shailendra Singh
  - "Yeh Naina Yaad Hain Piya K" with Shailendra Singh
  - "Lut Gaye Hum To Raho Me Manzil Koya" with Shailendra Singh
  - "He Baba He Baba, Mil Ke Ek Din"
  - "O Mitwaa Mitwaa Tujhko Aana Hi Padega"
- Mera Faisla -
  - "Idhar Ho Raha Hai, Udhar Ho Raha Hai" with Shabbir Kumar
  - "Mera Ek Deewana Mujhe Telephone Karta Hai" with Suresh Wadkar
  - "Photographer Jaldi Kar"
- Meraa Dost Meraa Dushman -
  - "Kaise Bedardi Se Aankh Ladi Re" with Kishore Kumar
  - "Kya Isi Ka Naam Jawani Hai"
  - "Jawani Cheez Badi"
- Meri Adalat -
  - "You Are Beautiful" with Kishore Kumar
  - "Raja Ji Rani Ji" with Shabbir Kumar
- Mujhe Shakti Do -
  - "Main Tere Liye Kya Kya Laoon" with Nitin Mukesh
  - "Dua Hai Meri Kadam Kadam Par" with Suresh Wadkar
  - "Yeh Kya Kiya Tune Yeh Kya Kiya" with Kishore Kumar
  - "Rukh Mod"
  - "Bolo Muh Dikhai Kaa Kya Mol Doge"
  - "Main Tere Liye Kya Laopn (female)"
- Naseeb Ki Naat -
  - "Angdayi Lee Jo Tan Ke"
  - "Holi Hai Holi Hai Bardon Hai Tarsaya Tune" with Suresh Wadkar
- Naya Kadam -
  - "Zindagi Ka Hum Itihaas Likhenge" with Kishore Kumar
  - "Saaila Aaya More Man Bhaaya" with Kishore Kumar
  - "Phool Jahan Wahan Bahar" with S. P. Balasubramanyam
  - "Ram Ho Kya Tum Patthar Ko Chukar" with S. P. Balasubramanyam
  - "Yeh Kya Hua Kya Hua" with S. P. Balasubramanyam
- Paapi Pet Ka Sawaal Hai - "Khilona Ban Ke Main Aa Gayi Hoon"
- Pakhandee -
  - "Tu Jab Bhi Dekhega" with Kishore Kumar
  - "Mehfil Yaaron Ki Mehfil" with Suresh Wadkar
- Patthar Ke Log - "Aaya Bade Ghar Se Daroga Babu"
- Pavitra Ganga -
  - "Ek Abla Ne Tujhko Pukara"
  - "Hum Bhi Tere Deewane" with Mohammed Rafi
- Pet Pyar Aur Paap - "Yeh Zindagi Kin Tohmaton Ki Naam Ho Gayi"
- Preet Na Jaane Preet -
  - "Bata Aye Dil Wafa Badnaam"
  - "Humri Gori Kaliyan Ma"
  - "Mujhe Us Paar Ki Duniya Mein"
  - "Abhi Na Itne Kareeb Aao" with Anwar
- Purana Mandir -
  - "Main Hoon Akeli Raat Jawaan"
  - "Woh Beete Din Yaad Hai (female)"
- Qaidi -
  - "Jawani Ka Khazana Hai, Romance Ka Zamana Hai" with Kishore Kumar
  - "Chandni Raat Hai Sanam" with Kishore Kumar
  - "Sanwali Se Hai Mujhe Pyar, Goriya Dafa Karo" with Kishore Kumar
  - "Baango Baango Baango"
- Raaj Tilak -
  - "Devta Re, Devta Re"
  - "Ajooba Ajooba" with Suresh Wadkar
  - "Ek Lafz-E-Mohabbat" with Shabbir Kumar
- Raja Aur Rana -
  - "Bheega Badan Sard Hawa"
  - "Laga Le Dum" with Mahendra Kapoor, and Suresh Wadkar
  - "Haye Masibat Jawani Ka Aana" with Mahendra Kapoor, and Suresh Wadkar
- Ram Ki Ganga - "Aaya Hai Maza"
- Ram Tera Desh -
  - "Kal Tak Izzatdar Thi"
  - "Ram Tera Desh"
  - "Zalzala"
- Sab Se Bada Paap -
  - "Suno Suno Meri Binati"
  - "Teri Nazar Meri Nazar" with Mohammed Aziz
- Sardaar - "Bua Bhadak Gaya"
- Shapath -
  - "Do Phool Jawani Ke"
- Sharaabi -
  - "Intehaa Ho Gayi, Intezaar Ki" with Kishore Kumar
  - "Log Kehta Hain Main Sharabi Hoon" with Kishore Kumar
  - "Mujhe Naulakha Maanga De" with Kishore Kumar
- Sharara -
  - "Apna Dil Toh Hai Awara"
  - "Maine Kiya Tyne Kiya" with Suresh Wadkar
- Sohni Mahiwal -
  - "Rab Tumhe Maaf Kare" with Anwar
  - "Sohni Meri Sohni" with Anwar
  - "Bol Do Mithe Bol Sohniye" with Shabbir Kumar
  - "Mujhe Dulhe Ka Sehra Gane Do" with Shabbir Kumar
  - "Chand Ruka Hai Raat Ruki Hai" with Shabbir Kumar
- Tarang - "Tarang Tarang"
- Tarkeeb -
  - "Chhuk Chhuk" with Kishore Kumar
  - "O Jaani" with Bappi Lahiri
- Teri Bahon Mein - "Money Money"
- The Gold Medal -
  - "Mere Kaatil Utha Botal"
  - "Main Tumko Dikhati Hoon Dupatta Tan Ke"
- Tohfa -
  - "Pyaar Ka Tohfa Tera" with Kishore Kumar
  - "Gori Tere Ang Ang Mein" with Kishore Kumar
  - "Milan Maujo Se Maujo Ka" with Kishore Kumar
  - "Ek Aankh Marun Toh, Chhori Pat Jaye" with Kishore Kumar
  - "O Milan Maujon Ka" with S P Balasubrahmanyam
- Unchi Uraan -
  - "Raat Bheegi Jaaye (version 1)" with Kishore kumar
  - "Raat Bheegi Jaaye (version 2)" with Kishore kumar
- Utsav - "Mann Kyun Behka Re"
- Wanted -
  - "Tu Hai Deewana, Tu Nahin Mana Mere Yaar" with Kishore Kumar
  - "Koi Lootera Dil Leke"
  - "Raat Aaye, Raat Jaye, Raaton Ki Rani Main" with Bappi Lahiri
- Waqt Ki Pukar - "Aale Dulha Raja Baaje Band Baaja"
- Yaadgaar -
  - "Saathi Yeh Rishta Hai Pyar Ka" with Kishore Kumar
- Yaadon Ki Zanjeer - "Kudrat Ke Insaaf Ko Tum Haath Mein Na Lo"
- Yeh Desh -
  - "Aaj Ki Raat Main"
  - "Meri Umar Ka Ek Ladka" with Kishore Kumar
- Yeh Ishq Nahin Aasan - "Dilrubaon Se Pyaar Nahin Karna" with Anwar
- Zakhmi Sher -
  - "O Mere Honewale Bachchon Ki Amma" with Kishore Kumar
- Zameen Aasmaan - "Pyar Naghma Hai, Pyar Sargam Hai" with R D Burman
- Zindagi Jeene Ke Liye -
  - "Raaz-e-Dil Khol De" with Kishore Kumar
  - "Aaja Ri Nindiya Aa"

=== 1985 ===
- Aaj Ka Daur -
  - "Hum Tujh Par Hi Shaida Hue Hai" with Kishore Kumar
  - "Gori Gori Gori Gori, Tan Tera Roop Ki Nadiya" with Kishore Kumar
  - "Shanivaar Tak Woh Officer Rehta Hai" with Shabbir Kumar
- Aakhir Kyon[62] - "Komal Hai Kamzor Nahin Hai Tu"
- Aandhi-Toofan -
  - "Peechha Tera Chhodunga Na" with Kishore Kumar
  - "O Baba O Baba"
  - "Bareba Bareba"
  - "Banu Ko Mil Gaya Jaanu" with Vijay Benedict, and Manhar Udhas
- Aar Paar - "Mera Naam Pannabai Patnewali" with Shailendra Singh
- Aetbaar -
  - "Awaaz Di Hain Aaj Ek Nazar Ne" with Bhupinder Singh
  - "Kisi Nazar Ko Tera Intezaar Aaj Bhi Hai" with Bhupinder Singh
  - "Tum Aur Main Aur Yeh Bekhudi"
- Alag Alag - "Ram Rahim Mein Antar Nahi" with K. J. Yesudas
- Amber -
  - "Aaj Hum Taaron Se Khelenge"
  - "Kal Ka Har Sapna Hamen, Aaj Pyaara Sa Lage"
  - "Kal Ka Har Sapna Hamen, Aaj Pyaara Sa Lage (sad)"
- Ameer Aadmi Gareeb Aadmi -
  - "Aisa Kyun Hota Hai"
  - "Har Ek Raasta Saja Ke Chal"
- Ankahee -
  - "Kauno Thagava Nagariya Lutal Ho"
  - "Mujhko Bhi Radha Bana Le Nandlal"
  - "Mujhko Bhi Radha Bana Le Nandlal (Sad)"
- Arjun -
  - "Munni Pappu Aur Chunnum"
  - "Dhadkan Pal Pal Badhti Jaaye"
- Awara Baap -
  - "Dil Ke Dushman Pe Dil Aa Gaya"
  - "Kori Kori Gagarsi Jawani"
  - "Umar Sari Humari" with Amit Kumar
- Babu - "Main Kunwari Albeli" with Kishore Kumar
- Balidaan -
  - "Aaja, Ek Ho Ja" with Kishore Kumar
  - "Jaan-E-Man Humko Aaj Pyar Karne Ka Licence Mil Gaya" with Kishore Kumar
  - "Kare Kaun, Bhare Kaun"
  - "More Saajan Pyaar Karoon Tohe"
- Bayen Hath Ka Khel (Unreleased) -
  - "Yeh Jhooth Bolti Hai" with Kishore Kumar
  - "Ek Bosa Humne Manga Wah Re Maula Shahji" with Kishore Kumar
  - "Kisi Ko Harana, Kisi Ko Jeetana" with Kishore Kumar
- Bepanaah -
  - "Najariya Teer Chalaye, Kamariya Sau Balkhaye" with Kishore Kumar
  - "Akelapan Mita Do Na"
  - "Jab Se Tum Ho Meri"
- Bewafai -
  - "Aaiye Na Kasam Se"
  - "Piya Aa, Piya Aa"
  - "Allah Hoo, Allah Hoo"
  - "Ek Nazar Bas Dekhe"
  - "Suno Zara Mere Sanam"
  - "Lachakta Jism, Jalte Lab"
- Bond 303 -
  - "Ab Jo Hoga So Hone Do" with Kishore Kumar
  - "Main Hoon Lily, Aayi Hoon"
- Chaar Maharathi -
  - "Prem Sikhai Je Premi" with Mohammed Aziz
  - "Humara Jiyara Khoi Gawa"
- Cheekh - "Le Maza Raat Guzar Jaaye Naa"
- Dekha Pyar Tumhara -
  - "Chaahe Duniya Chhute"
  - "Ek Hum Hain Jo Dinbhar Intezar" with S. P. Balasubrahmanyam
- Do Dilon Ki Dastaan -
  - "Main Main Na Raha, Tu Tu Na Rahi" with Shabbir Kumar
  - "Aap Ko Aap Se Chura Loon"
- Durga -
  - "Ab Naya Tamasha Dekhegi Ye Duniya Sari"
  - "O Nari Dukhiyari"
  - "Shera Wali Tera Darbar"
- Ek Chitthi Pyar Bhari -
  - "Yeh Hamari Tumari Khaani"
  - "O Tune Di Aawaz" with Manhar Udhas
- Ek Se Bhale Do -
  - "Aaja Re Meri Zamborin" with Kishore Kumar
  - "Kaam Karo Kaam" with S. P. Balasubrahmanyam, and Shailendra Singh
  - "Main To Nachungi"
- Farz Ki Keemat -
  - "Aankho Me Meri Chhaya Nasha"
  - "Dheere Dheere Haule Haule"
  - "Ek Shama Kitne Hai Parwane"
- Geraftaar -
  - "Dhoop Mein Nikla Na Karo" with Kishore Kumar
  - "Dil Se Dil Ki Pappi" with Mohammed Aziz
- Ganga Kinare -
  - "Jeevan Mein Sukh Paana Hai To"
  - "Kaise Dhyaan Karoon Main Bhagwan"
- Ghar Dwaar - "Saat Pheron Pe"
- Haqeeqat -
  - "Main Bharatmata" with Shabbir Kumar
- Hoshiyar -
  - "Bhaiya Ke Haath Mein" with S. P. Balasubrahmanyam
  - "Deewana Dil Sangeet Ka Deewana" with Bappi Lahiri
  - "Ho Ja Hoshiyaar"
  - "Choli Tere Tan Par Kasi Kasi" with Kishore Kumar
  - "Atka Atka Dil Mera Atka" with Kishore Kumar
  - "Teri Jaisi Koi Shreemati Chahiye" with Kishore Kumar
- Hum Dono -
  - "Tu Laajawab Tu Bemisaal" with Kishore Kumar
  - "Sun Le Zameen Aasmaan" with Kishore Kumar
  - "Doctor Baabu Doctor Baabu"
- Hum Naujawan -
  - "Aa Jana Bahon Mein"
  - "Ek Pal Pyar Ka Kabhi"
  - "Tera Aana Ek Pal Mere"
- Hum Paagal Premee -
  - "Aankhein Teri Humein Badi" with Mohammed Rafi
  - "Humse Tum Mile" with Amit Kumar
  - "Jaanejaana Yeh Hawayein" with Kishore Kumar
- Insaaf Main Karoonga -
  - "Aap Ki Nazron Se Dil Pe Goli Chalne Lagi" with Kishore Kumar
  - "Honey Honey, Kuch Maangun To Dena" with Bappi Lahiri
- Jaago - "Zindagi Hai Chaar Din Ko" with Mahendra Kapoor
- Jaan Ki Baazi -
  - "Aate Aate Teri Yaad Aa Gayi" with Mohammed Aziz
  - "Mujhko Khuda Mil Gaya" with Shabbir Kumar
  - "Baba Main To Tun Ho Gaya" with Amit Kumar
- Jab Pyar Hua - "Is Duniya Mein Thi" with Kishore Kumar
- Jhoothi -
  - "Bhaaga Bhaaga"
  - "Jhoothi Jhoothi"
  - "Thoda Jhuth To Akal Ka Ek Moti Hai" with Usha Mangeshkar
- Kab Tak Pukaroon -
  - "Kaise Jiyen Hum"
  - "Ek Baar Cahle Aao"
- Kala Suraj - "Ang Ang Mera Gaane Laga"
- Kali Basti -
  - "Kabhi Bole Haan, Kabhi Naa" with Suresh Wadkar
- Karm Yudh -
  - "Jawani Se Mile"
  - "Jinka Chika" with Amit Kumar
  - "Bahama Bahama" with Mohammed Aziz
- Kashmakash - "Yeh Jawaani Yahaan"
- Lallu Ram -
  - "Happy Birthday To You"
- Lava -
  - "Dil Kya Hai Ek Sheesha Hai" with Kishore Kumar, and Shailendra Singh
  - "Jeene De Ye Duniya (sad)"
  - "Jeene De Yeh Duniya, Chahe Maar Daale (female)"
  - "Jeene De Ye Duniya Chahe Maar Dale (Duet)" with Manmohan Singh
- Lover Boy -
  - "Baahon Mein Leke Mujhe Dil Chhu Liya (version 1)" with Kishore Kumar
  - "Baahon Mein Leke Nujhe Dil Chhu Liya (version 2)" with Kishore Kumar
  - "Main Tera Pyaar Hoon" with Kishore Kumar
  - "Jana Le Mujhe, Pehchan Le Mujhe" with Bappi Lahiri
  - "Janam Janam Se Teri Kahani Yehi Hai"
  - "Maa Indira (Saare Jahan Se Achchha)"
  - "Yaara Yaara Tu Seekh Le" with Amit Kumar
- Maha Shaktimaan -
  - "Gali Gali Mein Tujhe Dhoonda Sanam" with Shabbir Kumar
  - "Mamalu Mamalu O Papalu Papalu"
  - "Akhtar Akhtar"
- Mahaguru -
  - "Chikni Chikni Kanwal Jaisi Teri Jawaani" with Kishore Kumar
  - "Daalo Ji, Tum Jaal Daalo Ji, Jaal Mujh Par Daalo Ji" with Amit Kumar
  - "Phir Milne Aap Kab Aayenge" with Shabbir Kumar
  - "Kuch Din Pehle Tha Jo Begana" with Manhar Udhas
- Main Qatil Hoon -
  - "Apna Muqaddar Bana Le Mujhe"
  - "Teri Khudai Se Kuchh Nahi Maanga"
  - "Hawaye Geet Gaaye Fizaye Jagmagaye (happy)" with Mohammed Rafi
  - "Hawaye Geet Gaaye Fizaye Jagmagaye (sad)" with Mohammed Rafi
- Majboori -
  - "Badnaam Zindagi Se"
  - "Jab Pyaar Kisi Se Karna"
- Mard -
  - "Hum To Tambu Mein Bambu" with Mohammed Aziz
  - "Will You Marry Me?" with Anu Malik
- Masterji -
  - "Ankhen Khojo Toh Swami" with Kishore Kumar
  - "Jab Tanhai Me Do Badan Pas Ahte Hai" with Kishore Kumar
  - "Galo Par Ye Kaise Nishan" with Kishore Kumar
  - "Dum Kham Wala Balam Matwala"
- Mehak - "Dheere Dheere Saanwariya Bol"
- Mera Saathi -
  - "Sapnon Mein Kho Ja, Chupke Se So Ja" with Kishore Kumar
  - "Daddy Se Tujhko Milaungi" with Kishore Kumar
  - "Pyar Se Pyara Tu Tu, Mera Nazara Tu Tu" with Bappi Lahiri
  - "Sare Sapne Tu Tod Gayi" with S. P. Balasubrahmanyam
- Meraa Ghar Mere Bachche - "Jhansi Pe Rail Gaadi"
- Mohabbat -
  - "Zindagi Mein Pehla Pehla Tune Mujhko Pyar Diya Hai" with Kishore Kumar
- Naya Bakra -
  - "Aapse Dil Mila Ho Aapka Ho Gaya" with Kishore Kumar
  - "Mai Hu Pyar Ki Kitab Panna Panna Lajabab"
  - "Nayi Nayi Ye Jawani"
  - "Sajna Bin Tere Na Saje" with Amit Kumar
  - "Chatur Sundari Nach Zara" with Amit Kumar
  - "O Rekha Tujhe Dekha Jabse" with Mohammed Rafi
- Oonche Log - "Mastani Mastani Diljaani"
- Pataal Bhairavi -
  - "Jhanak Jhanak Jhanak Lehar Nache, Jiya Nache" with Kishore Kumar
  - "Jhum Jhumke Nacho Tum, Gao Geet Milan Ke" with Kishore Kumar
- Patthar -
  - "Main Tere Saath Hoon (female)"
  - "Mujhe Pyaar Mila"
  - "Mujhe Pyaar Mila (sad)"
  - "Main Tere Saath Hoon (duet)" with Pankaj Udhas
- Patthar Dil -
  - "Kya Karte Ho, Koi Dekh lEga" with Suresh Wadkar
  - "Hum Pyaar Karnewale"
  - "Aye Haye Haye Haye"
- Phaansi Ke Baad - "Motor Yaaron Ki" with Shabbir Kumar
- Pyari Behna -
  - "Tujhe Chhune Se" with Kishore Kumar
  - "Shaadi Ka Matlab" with Kishore Kumar
- Rahi Badal Gaye -
  - "Aasman Se Ek Sitara" with R D Burman
  - "Chori Chori" with Shailendra Singh
- Ramkali -
  - "Iss Mehfil Mein Pal Do Pal Mein"
  - "Nazar Jhukaye Baithe Ho"
  - "Huyi Gali Gali Badnaam"
- Rusvai - "Honge Kayi Raaz Hamare"
- Saagar -
  - "O Maria" with S P Balasubrahmanyam
  - "Jaane Do Naa" with Shailendra Singh
- Saaheb -
  - "Tukur Tukur Pyar Karoongi (version 1)"
  - "Tukur Tukur Pyar Karoongi (version 2)"
- Sanjog -
  - "Dil Kya Chaahe" with Kishore Kumar
  - "Chham Se Tu Aaye" with Suresh Wadkar
- Sarfarosh -
  - "Raat Meri Saiyan Se Aanban Ho Gayi"
  - "Ch Ch Ch Chor Chor" with Kishore Kumar
- Sautela Pati -
  - "Tum Humse Mile Jab Se" with Kishore Kumar
  - "Dhoop Bhare Chhat Pe"
  - "Humne Jaana Nahin Hum Chale Do Kadam (version 1)" with Mohammed Aziz
  - "Humne Jaana Nahin Hun Chale Do Kadam (version 2)" with Mohammed Aziz
- Sej Piya Ki - "Yeh Main Kahan Aa Gayi" with Mohammed Rafi
- Shiva Ka Insaaf -
  - "Ja Ja Re Mawaali"
  - "Aankhon Hi Aankhon Mein Jaan-E-Jaan Vaade Hue" with Mohammed Aziz
  - "Bhang Jamaye Rang Zara Sa" with Mohammed Aziz
- Sitamgar -
  - "Meri Tarah Allah Kare"
  - "Mausam Pyaar Ka" with Kishore Kumar
- Sooraj Mukhi - "Chhamiya Re Chalogi" with Mahendra Kapoor
- Sulagte Armaan -
  - "Ilzamon Ka Naam Zindagi"
- Surkhiyaan -
  - "Tere Hothon Ke Amrit Jab Na Mila" with Kishore Kumar
  - "Dil Zibda Rakhne Ke Liye" with Kishore Kumar
  - "Woh Ek Dost Jo Mujhe Khuda Sa Lagta Hai (female)"
  - "Kya Hai Awaaz Wahi"
- Tawaif -
  - "Mera Shauhar Bada Sharmeela" with Mahendra Kapoor
  - "Joban Anmol Balma"
  - "Bahut Der Kar Di"
  - "Aaj Ki Shaam"
- Telephone -
  - "Main Hoon Tujhpe Sun Fida"
  - "Saal Mubarak Ho"
- Triveni -
  - "Chahat Ke Rang Chadhne Lage"
  - "O Raaja Ji"
- Ulta Seedha -
  - "Uncle Robert Kya Bole Tumko" with Kishore Kumar, and Bonny Remedious
  - "Zulfon Ke Andhere Mein"
- Wafadaar -
  - "Dim Dim Dim Tana Dim" with Kishore Kumar
  - "Ek Chandan Ki Khushboo" with Kishore Kumar
  - "Sapnon Ka Tu Raja, Jeevan Mein Tu Aaja" with Mohammed Aziz
- Yaar Kasam - "Kahe Sarangi Suno Balamji"
- Yeh Kaisa Farz -
  - "Aaj Pyaar Ke Naam Par"
  - "Let's Have A Good Time Together" with Raam Laxman
- Yudh -
  - "Kya Hua, Kya Nahin" with Amit Kumar
  - "Main Kya Aise Pyar Karoongi" with Mahendra Kapoor
- Zabardast -
  - "Bhool Ho Gayi, Jaane De Sajna" with Kishore Kumar
  - "Karega Zamana Kya, Sach Ko Chhupana Kya" with Kishore Kumar
  - "Suno Sitamgar Mere" with R D Burman
  - "Aise Na Thukrao, Ae Sanam"
- Zamana -
  - "Ik Baat Hai Tumse" with Kishore Kumar
  - "Ganyat Saankli Sonachi" with Kishore Kumar, and Shailendra Singh
- Zulm Ka Badla -
  - "Pehle Kabhi Yeh Mausam Na Tha Itna Suhaana" with Mohammed Rafi
  - "Hai Allah Nigehbaan"
  - "Mumbai Ka Tu Maharaja"

=== 1986 ===
- Aag Aur Shola - "Meethi Meethi Hoti Hai Kasak" with Manhar Udhas
- Allah Rakha -
  - "Na Amar, Na Akbar, Na Main Anthony" with Shabbir Kumar
  - "Chahe Sholon Mein Jala Do" with Mohammed Aziz
  - "Parvardigar-E-Aalam"
  - "Badtameezi Pe Hum"
- Angaaray -
  - "Mujhe Zindagi Ne Mara"
  - "Tauba Tauba Karoge"
- Anjaam Khuda Jaane -
  - "Bazaar Mein Baithi Aurat Ko"
  - "Aap Jo Aa Gaye, Raat Kat Jaayegi"
  - "Paane Ko Pyaar Kisi Ka"
- Anokha Rishta -
  - "Aaj Ka Din Na Jaane Kyun"
  - "Chal Saheli Jhoomke"
  - "Tune Yeh Jaana"
- Anubhav - "Tere Hi Pyar Se Bhuje To Bhuje"
- Avinash -
  - "Yeh Pehli Mulakat Hai" with Bappi Lahiri
- Baat Ban Jaye - "Raja Tore Baag Ke"
- Bad-Kaar -
  - "Pyar Karo (Duniya Ki Aiso Taisi)"
- Begaana -
  - "O Dil Jaani Rab Di Mehrbani"
  - "Waqt Ke Saath" with Mohammed Aziz
  - "Dear Sir Aap Ko Main Bhut Chahti Hu" with Kishore Kumar
- Bhagwaan Dada -
  - "Aaya Aaya Pyaar Ka Zamana" with Mohammed Aziz
  - "Chug Gayi Chidiya Jo Khet"
  - "Pehli Baar Dil Jaala"
- Bud-Naseeb - "Bas Itni Meherbaani Aur Mere Meherbaan Kar Do"
- Car Thief -
  - "Jaane Mera Dil Kyun Chahe Tujhe" with Kishore Kumar
- Chameli Ki Shaadi -
  - "Utar Aayi Akhade Mein"
  - "Tu Jahan Bhi Chalega"
- Chhota Aadmi - "Haule Haule Haule Se Sajna" with Naresh Kanodia
- Dahleez -
  - "Jhoomti Baharon Ka Sama" with Mahendra Kapoor
  - "Tum Aaye To Humko Aaj Woh Phir Bhula Hua Qissa" with Mahendra Kapoor
  - "Dil Bekaraar, Wai Wai, Tujhpe Nisaar, Wai Wai" with Mahendra Kapoor
- Devar Bhabhi -
  - "Kabhi Is Paar Milenge" with Mahendra Kapoor
  - "Devar Ki Shaadi Mein Nachegi Bhabhi"
  - "Hey Kalyani"
- Dharam Adhikari -
  - "Ek To Kam Zindegani, Ussse Bhi Kam Naujawaani" with Shabbir Kumar
  - "Rup Dekhu Rang Dekhu" with Shabbir Kumar
  - "Jab Ladki Seeti Bajaaye" with Shabbir Kumar
  - "Suno Suno Suno Meree Zubaani" with Shabbir Kumar
- Dilwaala -
  - "Saath Saath Rehna Mere Saari Zindagi" with Kishore Kumar
  - "Chor Ko Pakdo, Zor Se Pakdo" with Kishore Kumar
- Ek Chadar Maili Si -
  - "Is Duniya Mein Aurat Kya Hai"
  - "Mar Gayi, Mar Gayi, Mar Gayi" with Makhan Singh
  - "Koi Sona, Koi Chandi, Koi Pitalbhari Paraat" with Shabbir Kumar
- Ek Main Aur Ek Tu -
  - "Re Main Logon Se Bol Doonga" with Mohammed Aziz
  - "Main Deewana" with Mohammed Aziz
  - "Jhanjhar Behta Hai"
- Ek Pal - "Aanewali Hai Bajaar"
- Ganga Aakhir Ganga Hai -
  - "Tum Rootho Chahe Manu"
- Ghar Sansar -
  - "Chot Lagi Kahan, Yahan Wahan" with Kishore Kumar
  - "Ghar Tere Aaungi Dulhan Banke" with Mohammed Aziz
- Ilzaam -
  - "Pehle Pehle Pyar Ki, Kya Hai Yeh Deewangi (Slow)" with Amit Kumar
  - "Pehle Pehle Pyar Ki, Kya Hai Yeh Deewangi (Fast)" with Amit Kumar
  - "Pyar Kiya Hai, Pyar Karenge" with Shabbir Kumar
- Inteqaam Ki Aag -
  - "Saawan Ki Sargam"
  - "Qayamat Naam Hai Kiska" with Mohammed Rafi
- Jaal -
  - "Main Hoon Dulhan Ek Raat Ki" with Mohammed Aziz
  - "Break Dance"
- Jeeva -
  - "Roz Roz Ankhon Tale" with Amit Kumar
  - "Chal Aaj Ke Din Rat Ka Wada" with Suresh Wadkar
  - "Aa Jagmagata Chaand Hai"
  - "Dil Pukare Dil Pukare Jeeva Re"
  - "Bas Ek Nazar Pe Jaan Ka Daromadar Hai"
- Jwala -
  - "O Dekhi Aaye Jawani Ke Din" with Kavita Krishnamurthy
  - "Jhoothe Balma Ka Babuji Pyaar Jhootha"
  - "Abhi Toh Mehfil Jami Nahin"
  - "Tu Bhi Luta De"
- Kaanch Ki Deewar - "Baaton Mein Na Talo Ji" with Mohammed Rafi
- Karamdaata -
  - "Ikdam Tikdam Tikdayee Re"
- Khamosh Nigahen -
  - "Maine Tumse Muskurake Baat Ki" with Kishore Kumar
  - "So Ja Re So Ja Raja"
  - "Khamosh Nigahen (version 1)"
  - "Khamosh Nigahen (version 2)"
  - "Khamosh Nigahen (version 3)"
- Khoon Aur Sazaa -
  - "Palal Tori Palla"
  - "Bahut Pila Di Hai"
  - "Tere Dil Mein Mujhe Rehna Hai" with Suresh Wadkar
- Kirayedar -
  - "Akkad Bakkad"
  - "Dil Diya Dil DLiya"
  - "Charon Taraf Pyaar Hai" with Mohammed Aziz
  - "Gaa Rahe Hain Dil Yehi" with Mahendra Kapoor
- Kismetwala - "Boogie Boogie" with Bappi Lahiri
- Krishna-Krishna -
  - "Nirmohi Natwar Se Pad Gaya Pala Re"
- Love and God - "Mohabbat Khuda Hai (version 1)"
- Maa Ki Saugandh x -
  - "Jab Chor Ban Jaaye Sipahiya"
  - "Chunri Le Gaya Kabutar Banke"
- Mangal Dada -
  - "Jahan Jidhar Se Jab Bhi Main Guzroon"
  - "Aa Jaanejaan Tera Mera Saath"
- Mera Dharam -
  - "Jao Jao Humse Kya" with Mohammed Aziz
  - "Jai Mata Ki" with Mohammed Aziz
  - "Janam Janam Janam Janam" with Kishore Kumar
  - "Dhoondhti Hai Tujhe Meri Tanhaiyan" with Manhar Udhas
- Muddat -
  - "Pyaar Humara Amar Rahega" with Mohammed Aziz
  - "Love Express" with Kishore Kumar
  - "Pedon Ko Gali Dene Do" with Kishore Kumar
  - "Utho Behno, Kali Banke"
- Musafir - "Sawan Sanwri Aankhen Choome"
- Naasamajh -
  - "Na Vaada Karo Tum, Na Nibha Sakoge" with Anwar
  - "Na Vaada Karo Tum, Na Nibhana Sakoge" with Anwar
  - "Saanson Mein Khushboo Hai" with Vinod Sehgal
  - "Teri Meri Kahani" with Suresh Wadkar
- Naseeb Apna Apna -
  - "Ek Ek Ankh Mere Sawa Sawa Lakh Ki"
  - "Zindagi Ki Jhoomti Gaati Baharon Mein Sanam" with Mohammed Aziz
  - "Pyar Pyar Pyar Pyar, Only Love, Only Love" with Shabbir Kumar
- Nasihat -
  - "Yeh Hawaayein Sard Sard Hain" with Suresh Wadkar
  - "Zindagi Hai Kitne Din Ki" with Kishore Kumar
- Palay Khan -
  - "Allah Kare Chham Se"
  - "Kabul Se Aaya Hai"
- Patton Ki Bazi -
  - "Jalta Hai Yeh Badan"
  - "Mera Sajna Mujhe Mil Gaya"
  - "Mora Saiyan Na Pakde Baiyan" with Udit Narayan
  - "Aaja Re Aaja Tu Aaja" with Anup Jalota
  - "Kanhaiya Tu Naiya Ko Paar Lagade" with Anup Jalota
  - "Chhum Chhananan Payal More Bole" with Anup Jalota
- Peechha Karro -
  - "Jaane Kya Hua Rama Rama" with Kishore Kumar
  - "Chhan Se Aaye, Chham Se Aaye" with Kishore Kumar
  - "Roz Shaam Piya Ghar Jaldi Se Aana"
- Pyaasi Mamta - "Gali Gali Mein Dil Do Lekar"
- Pyar Ki Pahli Nazar -
  - "Le Le Nigahon Ka Salaaam"
- Qatil Aur Ashiq - "Teri Meri Preet" with Shabbir Kumar
- Sadaa Suhagan -
  - "Yeh Gussa Kaise Utrega" with Mohammed Aziz
- Sajna Saath Nibhana - "Sajna Saath Nibhana" with Suresh Wadkar
- Savere Wali Gaadi -
  - "Dekho Yeh Kaun Aaya" with Suresh Wadkar
- Shatru - "Babuji Dil Loge"
- Samundar -
  - "Rang-E-Mehfil Badal Raha Hai"
- Sasti Dulhan Mahenga Dulha - "Aaj Jawani Aur Budhape Ka Mail Hoga" with Mohammed Aziz
- Singhasan -
  - "Kismat Likhnewale Par Zara Bas Jo Chale Hamara" with Kishore Kumar
  - "Wah Wah, Kya Rang Hai, Wah Wah, Kya Roop Hai" with Kishore Kumar
  - "Booba Booba, Meri Booba" with Bappi Lahiri
- Suhaagan -
  - "Ghunghta, Kholna Ghunghta" with Kishore Kumar
  - "Chhama Chham Chhai Chhai Chhai" with Kishore Kumar
  - "Aankhon Se Girana Na Tare, Mere Pyar" with Kishore Kumar
- Sultanat -
  - "Yaara Dilbar Dildaara Kitna Hai Pyara Pyara"
  - "Kya Hoon Main Tu Jaane Na"
  - "Jaanu Jaanam Jaan-E-Man Jaan-E-Tamanna Jaan-E-Jigar" with Shabbir Kumar
- Swarg Se Sunder -
  - "Ab Ke Baras, Barson Ke Baad" with Kishore Kumar
  - "Apna Ghar Hai Swarg Se Sunder" with Kishore Kumar
  - "Woh Din Yad Karo" with Kishore Kumar
  - "Sun Ri Meri Behna" with Lata Mangeshkar
- Swati -
  - "Aane Do Ab Zubaan Par" with Manhar Udhas
  - "Jannat Ka Khwab Hoon"
- Tahkhana - "Main Hoon Paagal"
- Tere Shehar Mein -
  - "Kehte Hai Kya Main Karun"
- Teri Aarzoo - "Masoom Nazar Ka Bholapan" with Suresh Wadkar
- Zindagani -
  - "Pyar Mujhe Kab Dogi" with Suresh Wadkar
  - "Tum Tum Ho To Hum Bhi Hai Kam Nahin" with Shailendra Singh

=== 1987 ===
- Aag Hi Aag -
  - "Lagli Lagli Aisi Hichki"
  - "Saajan Aa Jaao, Waada Karle Pyaar Mein"
  - "Aaja Re Saajan Aaja Re" with Shabbir Kumar
- Aage Mod Hai - "Dupahariya Basawariya Peeshe"
- Anjaam -
  - "Gore Hathon Se Kha Lo Ji Paan" with Kavita Krishnamurthy
- Apne Apne Sanskar - "Daru Piyela Majha Navara"
- Awaam -
  - "Yeh Raat Yeh Barsaat Yeh Tanhai Ka Aalam" with Mahendra Kapoor
  - "Raghupati Raghava Raja Ram" with Mahendra Kapoor
  - "Raghupati Raghava Raja Ram (Part- 2)" with Mahendra Kapoor
  - "Teri Aankhon Mein Dhundh Li Maine" with Mahendra Kapoor
  - "Kaise Murli Bajayee Ghanshyam"
  - "Mast Jawani Allah Hi Allah"
- Badla Aurat Ka -
  - "Ae Bhola Bhala Mann"
  - "Duniya Jalne De"
  - "Vaada Chhota Sa Vaada"
  - "Mangal Gauri Ko Sajao Ri"
- Bayen Hath Ka Khel -
  - "Ek Bosa Ham Ne Manga" with Kishore Kumar
  - "Ye Jhooth Bolti Hai" with Kishore Kumar
  - "Kisi Ko Hasana Kisi Ko Rulana" with Kishore Kumar
- Dak Bangla -
  - "Welcome Welcome"
  - "I Love You Jaanam"
- Dacait -
  - "Gaon Mein Mach Gaya Shor" with Kishore Kumar, and Suresh Wadkar
  - "Maine Kaha, Tumne Suna, Yeh Hawa Kehti Hai Kya" with Suresh Wadkar
  - "Kis Kaaran Naiya Doli" with Suresh Wadkar
- Daku Hasina - "Nagar Nagar Hai Taza Khabar"
- Dance Dance -
  - "Aa Gaya Aa Gaya Halwa Wala Aa Gaya (version 2)" with Vijay Benedict
- Deewana Tere Naam Ka -
  - "Ae Sharmana Chhod De" with Ashok Khare
  - "Aise Mara Thumka"
- Dil Tujhko Diya -
  - "Zindagi Chand Dino Ki" with Kishore Kumar
  - "Mast Sama, O Meri Jaan"
- Diljalaa -
  - "Pyaar Ki Jab Koi Baat Chali" with Kishore Kumar
  - "Jaan Tan Se Tan Jaan Se"
  - "Khushiyan Ho Teri Ham Dam"
- Ek Ladki Badnaam Si -
  - "Bam Bhole, Koi Mare Koi Jiye" with Ranu Mukherjee, and Ajit Singh
  - "Zindagi Hai Hans Hans Ke Jeene Ke Liye" with Kishore Kumar
- Faqeer Badshah -
  - "Bahut Kala Savera Hai" with Chandrani Mukherjee
  - "Yu Na Dekh Mujhe"
  - "Beet Gaye Hai Kitne Zamane"
  - "Maine Rakh Di Nishane Pe Jaan"
- Ghar Ka Sukh -
  - "Ab Sun Le Meri Pukaar" with Sujata
  - "Le Lo Le Lo Babuji"
- Goraa -
  - "Jhumka Jhula Le, Chahe Ghungta Utha Le"
  - "Chhankegi Payal Toofan Mach Jaayega"
  - "In Aankho Ko Aashiq Sharab Kahe To" with Mohammed Aziz, and Mahendra Kapoor
- Hawalaat -
  - "Hay Re, Tera Bholapan"
  - "Aage Phir Jo Landan Mein Ho" with Kishore Kumar
  - "Tere Husn Ka Charcha Ab To Hone Laga Hai Gali Gali" with Mohammed Aziz
- Hifazat -
  - "Duniya Ka Athwa Ajooba" with Kishore Kumar
  - "Bataata Vada" with S. P. Balasubrahmanyam
  - "Dil Ka Darwajja Khol De"
  - "Mohabbat Hai Kya Cheej" with Suresh Wadkar
  - "Dil Toh Chaahe Hamaara Jaise" with Amit Kumar
- Himmat Aur Mehanat -
  - "Chhuee Muee, Chhuee Muee Ho Gayi" with Mohammed Aziz
  - "Touch Me, Touch Me, I Want To Feel Your Body" with Kishore Kumar
  - "Mumbai Roke To Roke, Dilli Roke To Roke" with Kishore Kumar
  - "Woh Ek Dost Jo Mujhko"
  - "Amma (happy)"
  - "Amma (sad version 1)"
  - "Amma (sad version 2)"
- Hiraasat -
  - "Baaton Se Baat Na Banegi" with Kishore Kumar
  - "Main Hoon Albeli"
  - "Makhmali Badan"
- Imaandaar -
  - "Bada Shaitan Hai Dil (female)"
  - "Aur Is Dil Mein (female)"
- Inaam Dus Hazaar -
  - "Chand Koi Hoga Tumsa Kahan" with Kishore Kumar
  - "Jo Chham Se Nikal Gayi Raat"
- Insaniyat Ke Dushman -
  - "Aisa Ladka Mila Na" with Shabbir Kumar
  - "Om Sai Ram" with Suresh Wadkar
  - "O Meri Soniye, O Meri Heeriye" with Suresh Wadkar
- Itihaas -
  - "Dilruba O Dilruba" with Shabbir Kumar
  - "Mausam Awara" with Suresh Wadkar
  - "Shabba Khair"
- Jaan Hatheli Pe - "Chhuo Na, Chhune Do, Chhodo Bhi" with Kishore Kumar
- Kaash -
  - "Chhoti Si Hai Baat, Koi Nahin Yeh Jane" with Mohammed Aziz
- Kalyug Aur Ramayan -
  - "Kya Kya Na Sitam" with Vishal Goswami
  - "Yahan Lukhta Yahan Mukhta" with Mahendra Kapoor
- Kamagni -
  - "Aa Gaya Sapna Koi" with Suresh Wadkar
  - "Mai Hasin Tu Jawan"
- Khazana -
  - "Mehfil Mein Sayanon Ki Ek Deewana Aa Gaya" with Mohammed Rafi, and Usha Mangeshkar
  - "Khazane Ki Chabi Mere Paas Hai"
- Khooni Darinda - "Aayega Koi Mere Paas"
- Maashuka -
  - "Ghungroo Bole Chham Chham" with Suresh Wadkar
- Madadgaar -
  - "Ek Do Teen Chaar, Humse Karo Pyar" with Kishore Kumar
  - "Kaun Si Jaane Film Thi"
  - "Ikraar Kar De Ya Inkaar Kar De"
- Mahananda - "Sapne Mein Chupke Se"
- Majaal -
  - "Hay Rama, Hay Rama" with Kishore Kumar
  - "Sharabon Se Kya Mujhko Kaam" with Kishore Kumar
  - "Ting Ting Ghanti Baje, Dil Mein Ghanti Baje" with Kishore Kumar
  - "Tum Into Main, Main Into Tum" with Kishore Kumar
  - "Itni Kisi Ki Majaal Kahan" with Mohammed Aziz
- Marte Dam Tak -
- Mera Karam Mera Dharam - "Mor Papiha Koyal"
- Mera Yaar Mera Dushman -
  - "Kabhi Khulke Mile, Kabhi Milke Khule" with Kishore Kumar
  - "Hansee Loot Gayi"
- Meraa Suhaag -
  - "Kismat Walon Ko Milta Hai"
  - "Kismat Walo Ko Milta Hai (part 2)"
  - "Parody Song"
  - "Mera Dil Tera" with Kishore Kumar
  - "Jaa Tu Bada Anari" with Pankaj Dheer
- Muqaddar Ka Faisla -
  - "Teen Lok Ke Nath Kanhaiya Ji Ne Janam Liyo Re" with Kishore Kumar
  - "Hum Na Hum Rahe"
  - "Hay, Yeh Paisa"
- Naam O Nishan -
  - "Naam O Nishan"
  - "Peena Hai Agar"
  - "Sona Main Sona"
- Nafrat -
  - "Aaja Mere Yaar"
  - "Aaj Ka Din Toh Sanam"
- Param Dharam -
  - "Main Loot Jaaun, Main Mit Jaaun" with Bappi Lahiri
  - "Pyar Pyar Pyar, Pyar To Hai Pyar" with Bappi Lahiri
  - "Jab Se Tujhe Piya Honthon Se Chhoo Liya" with Mohammed Aziz
  - "Allah, Jab Se Hui Main Jawaan" with Mohammed Aziz
- Pyaar Karke Dekho -
  - "Hakki Petai Lakamma, Hakki Petai Lakamma" with S. P. Balasubrahmanyam
  - "Tumhare Bin Hum Adhure, Hamare Bin Tum Adhure" with Vijay Benedict
- Pyar Ajnabi Hai - "Tumse Saje Hain Mere Sapne Sunehre"
- Pyar Ke Kabil -
  - "Aaj Ki Raat Dono Saath"
  - "Baby Baby Baby, Meri Pyaari Baby"
- Pyar Ki Jeet -
  - "Mujhe Rehna Hai Tere Dil Mein" with Kishore Kumar
  - "Meri Ek Ada Lakh Lakh Di"
  - "Ae Dost Tu Be-imaan Hai"
  - "Aaj Mere Pyar Ki Jeet"
  - "Mainu Rab Di Saun"
  - "Dulhe Raja Dekh"
- Raahi - "Maa Ne Keh Di Haan" with Suresh Wadkar
- Secret Agent -
  - "Humne Dekha Yehi"
  - "Hoke Kabhi Kabhi" with Bappi Lahiri
  - "Maikal Ki Kimsat" with Mohammed Rafi
- Sher Shivaji -
  - "O Dukhiyan Ke Daata Bholenath Bhagwan"
  - "Darr Bhi Chhoda Tujhe Mann Mein Basa Ke"
  - "Deepawali Manayi Suhaani Mere Sai Ke Haathon Mein"
- Sitapur Ki Geeta -
  - "Lachak Lachak Jaye Jawani" with Amit Kumar
  - "Yaad Kar Yaad Kar"
  - "Phaink More Raja Rupaiya"
- Thikana -
  - "Ajnabee Koi Kabhi"
  - "Bachana Dil Bachana"
- Vishal - "Seene Mein Dil Mera Dhak Dhak" with Kishore Kumar
- Woh Din Aayega -
  - "Yeh Jo Hua Sach Kaho Kya Hua" with Kishore Kumar
  - "Haye Re Nazar Lad Gayi"
  - "Ram Kasam Babu"
  - "Yeh Hai Mere Pyaar Ki Nishani"

=== 1988 ===
- Aakhri Muqabla -
  - "Paayal Pagli Pyaar Jagaaye"
  - "Jaaneman Tune Paani Mein Kya Jaadu Daala"
- Bahaar -
  - "Baahon Mein Aasmaan Le Chala"
  - "Main Paani Mein Bheege Aise"
- Be-Lagaam - "Phool Ki Dali Kehke Na Modo" with Suresh Wadkar
- Chatran -
  - "Dhoop Chhaon Mein Bani Aisi Zindagi"
  - "Na Toh Dariya Ruka"
  - "Pyaar Hi Pyaar Hai"
  - "Zindagi Zindagi Khubsoorat Hai Tu (version 1)"
  - "Zindagi Zindagi Khubsoorat Hai Tu (version 2)" with Gulzar
- Chintamani Surdas - "Ghungroo Chhod Diye Maine"
- Commando -
  - "Ga Ga Re Ga, Gadi Chale" with Kishore Kumar
- Dharam Shatru -
  - "Barson Se Pyaar Ka Deewana Mera Dil"
  - "De Doongi Jaan Tujhe"
  - "Woh Dilruba Door Se Aayi Hai" with Amit Kumar
- Dharmyudh -
  - "Sawan Ka Mahina"
  - "Chhoti Si Zindagi Ke Liye"
- Do Waqt Ki Roti -
  - "Aaj Ki Raat Meri Gali Mein" with Chandrani Mukherjee
  - "Kisi Pe Dil Ke Aane Se"
  - "Main Aayi Main Aayi"
- Dukh Dard -
  - "Yugon Se Yehi Hota Hai"
  - "Meri Aankh Jab Khuli"
- Ek Hi Maqsad -
  - "Mere Mehboob Hai Aur"
  - "Ghungroo Toot Gaye" with Pankaj Udhas
- Ek Naya Rishta - "Mera Mehboob"
- Faisla -
  - "Champa Khili Daar" with Mohammed Rafi
  - "Dulha Raja Mera" with Kishore Kumar
  - "Andheri Hai Raat Sajan"
  - "Koi Toh Aaye Re, Bada Intezaar Hai"
- Falak -
  - "Tere Naam Ka Hai Hai (version 1)" with Mohammed Aziz
  - "Tere Naam Ka Hai Hai (version 2)" with Mohammed Aziz
- Ghar Ghar Ki Kahani -
  - "Noorjahan Tu Kahan" with Bappi Lahiri
  - "Kisi Se Jab Pyaar Hua"
- Gharwali Baharwali - "Sharab Ya Shabab"
- Gunahon Ka Faisla -
  - "Jawani Mein Jawani Ka Maza Lena"
  - "Bandh Kamre Mein Hoga Faisla"
  - "Chal Hat Baaju Raja"
- Halaal Ki Kamaai -
  - "Chhote Jahaan Ab Tera Damaan"
  - "Ankhon Mein Tu Hi Tu" with Shabbir Kumar
- Hatya - "Aapko Agar Zarurat Hai" with Kishore Kumar
- Hum Farishte Nahin -
  - "Abhi Abhi Mera Dil Mere Paas Tha"
  - "Sanwala Badan Aisi"
- Hum To Chale Pardes - "Mil Gaye Hum Aur Tum" with Shabbir Kumar
- Ijaazat -
  - "Mera Kuchh Saamaan"
  - "Khali Haath Shaam Aayi Hai"
  - "Chhoti Si Kahani Se"
  - "Katra Katra Milti Hai"
- Jaan-e-Jaana - "Tu Na Mila Toh"
- Kabrastan -
  - "Do Din Ka Hai Khel Jawaani"
- Kabzaa - "Heere Motiyon Se Pehle Mujhe Tol Sajna"
- Kanwarlal -
  - "Kanwarlal Kanwarlal" with Amit Kumar
  - "Jahan Mile, Jidhar Mile"
- Kasam -
  - "Kasam Kya Hoti Hai (female)"
  - "Kasam Kya Hoti Hai (version 1)" with Nitin Mukesh
  - "Kasam Kya Hoti Hai (version 2)" with Nitin Mukesh
  - "Oh Kanha" with Mohammed Aziz
  - "Garam Garam Pani"
- Kehkasha -
  - "Koi Humnafas Nhain Hai"
  - "Aja Jaane Ki Zid Na Karo" with Bhupinder Singh
- Khoon Bhari Maang -
  - "Jeene Ke Bahaane Lakhon Hain"
  - "Main Haseena Ghazab Ki" with Sadhana Sargam
- Libaas - "Kal Ki Raat Giri Thi Shabnam"
- Mahaveera -
  - "Kachiyan Kaliyan Na Tod Ve"
  - "Is Bairan Taqdeer Ko"
- Mardangi -
  - "Gharwali Bana Le Mujhe" with Mohammed Aziz
  - "Hamare Husn Ka Jadoo" with Shabbir Kumar
  - "Chahe Dushman Bane Zamana"
- Mardon Mein Mard - "Nako Nako Bole"
- Mardon Wali Baat -
  - "Aaja Tujhe Main Bahon Mein Kas Loon" with S. P. Balasubrahmanyam
  - "O Saajan Beet Na Jaaye Saawan" with S. P. Balasubrahmanyam
  - "Mardon Wali Baat Kare"
  - "Nasha Husn Ka Utar Jaayega" with Suresh Wadkar
- Mera Shikaar -
  - "Chalo Prem Daas"
  - "Thoda Sa Pyaar"
  - "Humko Yaad Na Karna"
- Mere Baad - "Kaise Bhulaoon Re Amma"
- Mohabbat Ke Dushman -
  - "Dil Khoya Khoya Gumsum"
  - "Tumne Kaha Hum Bin"
  - "Bahut Kaat Chuka Hai Safar"
  - "Mohabbat Ibadaat Hai"
- Mulzim -
  - "Pyaar Ka Badla" with Mohammed Aziz
  - "Chal Gori Pyaar Ke Gaaon" with Nitin Mukesh
  - "Sau Saal Tu Jeeti Rahe" with Mohammed Aziz, and Rema Lahiri
- Nagin Aur Nagina -
  - "Main Hoon Teri Nagin" with Shabbir Kumar
  - "Nagin Hoon Main"
- Naam Hai Krishna - "Na Hota Main Awara" with Amit Kumar
- Paanch Fauladi -
  - "Lach Lach Lachke Kamariya"
- Paap Ki Duniya -
  - "Ganga Ko Dekha, Jamuna Ko Dekha" with Shabbir Kumar, and Rema Lahiri
  - "Zindagi Pyaar Hai" with Shabbir Kumar, and Shailendra Singh
- Parbat Ke Us Paar -
  - "Aaja Ke Meri Jaan Ko Karaar Nahin Hai" with Mohammed Aziz
  - "Aaja Ranjhan Yaara Aaja (Happy)" with Mohammed Aziz
  - "Aaja Ranjhan Yaara Aaja (Sad)" with Mohammed Aziz
  - "Ishqe Di Dor Na Toote" with Mohammed Aziz
- Police Ke Peechhe Police - "Rabba Ve Mainu"
- Prem Sandesh -
  - "Dil Se Jo Dil Mile" with Mohammed Aziz
- Pyar Ki Manzil -
  - "Mujhko Daga Denewale"
  - "Yeh Awaaz Kaisi Aayi" with Suresh Wadkar
- Rama O Rama - "Tauba Aashiq Aur Aisa" with Mohammed Aziz
- Rihaee -
  - "Teru Meri Bairan Raat Ladi"
- Saazish -
  - "Yeh Jawani Badi Jawani" with Amit Kumar
  - "Yeh Shehar Yeh Shehar" with Kishore Kumar
- Sagar Sangam -
  - "Humri Mano To"
  - "Gaon Ki Chhori" with Bappi Lahiri
- Shahenshah - "Hey You"
- Sherni -
  - "Mushkil Hai Mushkil"
  - "Koi Mard Mila Na Aisa" with Mohammed Aziz
- Shree Datta Darshan -
  - "Vandan Hai Vandan Hai"
  - "Laay Hoon Kanchan Se"
- Sone Pe Suhaaga -
  - "Dil Afridam" with Kishore Kumar
  - "Seene Se Laga Loon Tujhe" with Kishore Kumar
  - "Meena Ki Shaadi Aa Gayi"
  - "Tune Mujhe Taaka" with Nitin Mukesh
- Soorma Bhopali - "Baadal Sataye"
- Tadap Aisi Bho Hoti Hai -
  - "Yaaro Zara Thaam Ke Bajaao" with Shailendra Singh
  - "Bhool Jaa Duniya Ko" with Shailendra Singh
  - "Ishq Mein Jab Hum Qatl Huye Toh"
  - "Tadap Jeene Nahin Deti" with Amit Kumar, and Sadhana Sargam
- Tamacha -
  - "Sara Din Bas Duty Duty"
  - "Dilbar Dilbar, O Dilbar Jani, Kehti Hai Rut Yeh Suhani" with Mohammed Aziz, and Shailendra Singh
- Tawaaif Ki Beti - "Pyar Diwana Ho Gaya" with Anwar
- Tohfa Mohabbat Ka -
  - "Tujhe Bhoolne Ki Koshish"
  - "Sun Sun Aye Sunita" with Anup Jalota
  - "Sun Sun Ho Gori" with Anup Jalota
- Trishagni - "Aisa Laage Kahin Door Se"
- Vijay -
  - "Tera Karam Hi Tera Vijay Hai"
  - "Rakhna Athanni Sambhal Ke"
- Waaris - "Aare Munhe, Taare Munhe"
- Waqt Ki Awaz -
  - "I Want To Hit Somebody" with Kishore Kumar
  - "Ladki Akeli Tu Bhi Akela" with Kishore Kumar
  - "Guru Guru Jao Guru" with Kishore Kumar
  - "Tu Bhi Bekaraar, Main Bhi Bekaraar" with Mohammed Aziz
- Woh Mili Thi - "Hamein Kya Garaz" with Kishore Kumar
- Zakhmi Aurat -
  - "Tauba Tauba, Allah Tauba"
  - "Pal Pal Jale Meri Aatma"
- Zalzala - "Dil Hai Kab Kis Pe"
- Zulm Ko Jala Doonga -
  - "Dhak Dhak Dhak Dil Karne Laga" with Mohammed Aziz
  - "Din Shuru Hota Hai Tere Naam Se" with Mohammed Aziz

=== 1989 ===
- Aag Ka Gola - "Aa Aa, Aa Bhi Jao Na, Na Na, Yun Satao Na" with Mohammed Aziz
- Aag Se Khelenge -
  - "Meri Patli Kamar" with Mohammed Aziz
  - "Help Me" with Amit Kumar
  - "Tere Naina" with Amit Kumar
  - "Mere Sajan" with Amit Kumar
  - "Chhede Been Sapera, Nache Nagan Kali" with Amit Kumar, Kavita Krishnamurthy, and Udit Narayan
- Aakhri Badla - "Jaane Kaisa Jaadoo Yeh Chal Gaya"
- Aakhri Ghulam -
  - "Pyar Mila To Jaana Yeh Dil Ne" with Shabbir Kumar
  - "Saathiya O Saathiya (Part-1)" with Shabbir Kumar
- Albela -
  - "Badi Mushkil Se"
  - "Music Is My Life" with Amit Kumar
- Anaar - "Main Toh Balam Tore"
- Apne Begaane -
  - "Dushman Ho Gayi Meri Jawani" with Suresh Wadkar
  - "Jabse Piya Laage Tose More Nainwa"
- Bahurani -
  - "Woh Kya The"
  - "Ek Haseena Jab Se Mili, Dil Hai Bekaraar" with Amit Kumar
  - "Duniya Ki Nazaron Se Chhupke Mile" with Shailendra Singh
  - "Chhora Chhori Se Bhi Gora" with Dilraj Kaur
- Chandni - "Parbat Se Kai Ghata Thakraee" with Vinod Rathod
- Daata -
  - "Meri Jaan Pyar Karo, Pyar Hi Pyar Karo Pyare"
- Desh Ke Dushman -
  - "Jo Mujhe Dekhe" with Mohammed Aziz
  - "Main Hoon Nagina" with Mohammed Aziz
  - "Jo Zulm Kiye Tune Unka Badla"
  - "Shikari Brahamchari"
- Doorie - "Yeh Mausam Yunhi Aata Jaata Rahe" with Suresh Wadkar
- Dost -
  - "Tu Hi Heera" with Amit Kumar
  - "Step By Step" with Amit Kumar
  - "Dil To Chahe Yeh" with Amit Kumar
  - "Chhota Sa Parivar" with Amit Kumar
- Farz Ki Jung -
- Galiyon Ka Badshah - "Kya Yeh Mumkin Hai" with Kishore Kumar
- Gair Kanooni -
  - "Sare Shahar Mein Ek Ladka" with Kishore Kumar
  - "Jai Laxmi, Jai Laxmi, Jai Jai Bolo" with Bappi Lahiri
  - "Nakko Baba, Nakko Baba, Pyar Ka Yeh Rog" with Bappi Lahiri
- Ghabrahat - "Yaari Aasan Tere Naal"
- Ghar Ka Chiraag -
  - "Tutak Tutak Tutiyan (female)"
- Gola Barood - "Dard-E-Dil Ka Mere"
- Guru -
  - "Aai Aai Yo"
- Hisaab Khoon Ka -
  - "Hey You, Do You Love Me"
  - "Shokh Baharon Ka Mausam" with Mohammed Aziz
- Hum Intezaar Karenge - "Door Hai Toh Kya"
- Ilaaka -
  - "Khali Botal Ki Tarah Har Aadmi Hai Khali" with Kishore Kumar
  - "Deva O Deva, Gali Gali Mein Tere Naam Ka Hai Shor" with Kishore Kumar
  - "Aayi Hai Aaj To Holi Khelenge Hum, Dubke Rang Mein" with Amit Kumar
  - "Pyar Se Bhi Zyada Tujhe Pyar Karta Hoon" with Mohammed Aziz
- Joshilaay -
  - "Dhar Dham Chak Lag Gayi"
  - "Na Ja Jaan-E-Jaan" with R. D. Burman
  - "O Dhola Dhol Manjira Baje Re" with Suresh Wadkar
  - "Dhak Dhak Jiya Kare, Jane Kya Piya Kare" with Usha Mangeshkar
- Jung Baaz - "Rain Andheri, Akeli Jawani" with Mohammed Aziz
- Jurrat -
  - "Main Neend Chura Loongi"
  - "O Saiyaad, Rakh Yaad"
- Kahan Hai Kanoon -
  - "Do Jism Ek Jaan Hain Hum"
  - "Do Jism Ek Jaan Hain Hum (Duet)" with Bappi Lahiri
- Kala Bazaar - "Kehdo Yeh Haseenon Se" with Anwar, Kumar Sanu, and Sadhana Sargam
- Kanoon Apna Apna -
  - "Pehli Nazar Mein" with S. P. Balasubrahmanyam
  - "Gayi Gayi" with Mohammed Aziz
  - "Chini Mini" with Amit Kumar
- Kanoon Ki Awaaz - "Aankhon Hi Aankhon Mein"
- Kasam Vardi Ki -
  - "Aayi Main Aayi, Dil Lene Aayi"
  - "Dil Kahin Kho Gaya, Main Kahin Kho Gayi" with Mohammed Aziz
  - "Pyar Mein Kya Ghabrana" with Amit Kumar
- Love Love Love - "Hum To Hain" with Vijay Benedict
- Mahaadev -
  - "Fikar Na Kar"
  - "Dilwale Raat Hai"
  - "Rimjhim Rimjhim" with Suresh Wadkar
- Manu The Great -
  - "Re Baba Re Baba Kaisi Yeh Jawanu"
  - "Jo Tere Kaam Na Aayi"
- Mera Farz -
  - "Chandni Mein Lipti Hui" with Amit Kumar
  - "Yeh Gulaabi Shaam Ka Nasha" with Amit Kumar
- Mera Naseeb -
  - "Main Hoon Angoothi, Tu Hai Nageena" with Mohammed Aziz
  - "Kya Soch Rahe Ho Jaani"
  - "Jo Hoga So Hoga"
  - "Darwaza Bandh Thi, Khidki Khuli Thi" with Dilraj Kaur
- Meri Zabaan -
  - "Honthon Pe Naam"
  - "Dam Maara" with Anu Malik
- Mil Gayee Manzil Mujhe -
  - "Jaanam Kahin Na Jaaya Karo"
  - "Jaa Main Yihse Rooth Gayi"
  - "Yeh Zindagi Ka Fasana Hai Kya" with Kishore Kumar
  - "Tum Jo Mile Toh Phool Khile" with Kishore Kumar
  - "Ek Taraf Tum, Ek Taraf Hum" with Kishore Kumar, and Shailendra Singh
- Mitti Aur Sona -
  - "One Two Three" with Amit Kumar
  - "Mitti Ban Jaye" with Amit Kumar
  - "Mara Jisko" with Shabbir Kumar
- Nafrat Ki Aandhi - "Kaise Tum Thanedar"
- Naqab -
  - "Nainon Se Naina Lad Gaye" with Suresh Wadkar
  - "Na Kisi Ka Dil Mujhe Chahiye"
  - "Jaaneman Jaanewafa"
  - "Aankhen Meri Badalne Laga"
  - "Do Phool Meri Kabar Mein"
  - "Beti Nahin Main Teri"
- Nehru – The Jewel of India -
  - "Hato Chhodo Sanwariya"
  - "Nain Chubhat Saajan Bina"
- Paanch Papi -
  - "Dhak Dhak Dil Mera Karta Hai" with Mohammed Aziz
  - "Aap Ki Khatir Jaan Hai Hazir" with Amit Kumar
- Paap Ki Sazaa - "Main Kaisi Lagti Hoon" with Shabbir Kumar
- Parinda -
  - "Pyaar Ke Mod Par" with Suresh Wadkar
  - "Tumse Mil Ke" with Suresh Wadkar
  - "Tumse Mil Ke" with Suresh Wadkar, and R D Burman
- Prem Pratigyaa -
  - "Pyaar Kabhi Na Nahin Karna" with Bappi Lahiri
  - "Baaho Me Bottle, Bottle Me Daaru" with Kishore Kumar
  - "Na Jaanu Ram Meri Bindiya Kaha Gayi"
- Saat Ladkiyan - "Meri Jaan Mera Pyaar Hai Tu"
- Saaya -
  - "Janamdin Mubarak Ho"
- Sachche Ka Bol-Bala -
  - "Main Toh Hoon Malamaal" with Bappi Lahiri
  - "Yeh Hawayen" with Kishore Kumar
- Santosh - "Batao Tumhe Pyaar Kaise Karun" with Nitin Mukesh
- Shagun -
  - "Kanha Re"
- Sikka -
  - "Jab Tak Hai Dum Mein Dum" with Vijay Benedict
  - "Adhi Raat Ko Aankh Khuli" with Kishore Kumar
- Socha Naa Tha -
  - "Socha Naa Tha Tumse" with Shahid Rafi
  - "Hey Hey Babu"
- Tauhean -
  - "Tujhe Usse Mohabbat Hai" with Kishore Kumar
  - "Pyaar Karo, Pyaar Karo, Pyaar Karo" with Mohammed Aziz, and Manhar Udhas
  - "Babbai Babbai, Tu Mera Babbai"
  - "Yaad Unko Nahin Aaj Ke Raat Bhi" with Bappi Lahiri
- Tere Bina Kya Jeena -
  - "Mohabbat Ka Zamana" with Shabbir Kumar
  - "Mere Dil KI Halat Dekh"
- Time Limit - "Aji Ruko Toh Zara" with Amit Kumar
- Tujhe Nahin Chhodunga -
  - "Dhalke Chunariya Re" with Shabbir Kumar
- Vardi -
  - "Oye, Rab Ne Tujhe Husn Diya" with Shabbir Kumar
  - "Maine Kitne Dil Liye"
- Vidhaan -
  - "Poochho Na Zindagi Se"
  - "Nazar Milti Hai" with Shailendra Singh
- Vidrohi -
  - "Bahen Meri Dulhan Bani"
  - "Nazar Imaan Ki"
  - "Raat Bhar Rahiyo"
- Waasta -
  - "Chali Purvai Jhoome Angnaai"
  - "Maa Bolo Kan Talak Yun"
- Waqt Ki Zanjeer -
  - "Qismat Hamein Layi Hai"
  - "Sar-e-Bazaar"
- Zakham -
  - "Aise Jeene Se Kya Haasil" with Mohammed Aziz
  - "Mumbai Chi Chhokri" with Bappi Lahiri

== 1990s ==
=== 1990 ===
- Agneekal - "Pankhida O Pankhida" with Udit Narayan, and Tinu Anand
- Aag Ka Dariya -
  - "Dilbar Dilbar" with Shabbir Kumar
  - "Goriya Uski Deewani"
- Andher Gardi -
  - "Aise Na Dekho Deewane" with Amit Kumar
  - "Raat Ke Sar Se Aanchal Dhalka" with Amit Kumar
  - "Gulbadan Jaan-e-Chaman" with Amit Kumar
  - "Pehle Bhi Tanhaai Thi"
- Appu Raja -
  - "Matwale Yaar Teri Jay" with S. P. Balasubrahmanyam
  - "Woh To Bana Apna" with S. P. Balasubrahmanyam
- Aulad Ki Khatir - "Tu Bhi Tadpega, Mujhe Tadpanewale" with Suresh Wadkar
- Awaargi -
  - "Dak Babu Aaya"
- Awwal Number - "Tere Liye Aayi Hoon"
- Chhotu Ka Badla -
  - "Aa Pee Le Pee Le"
- Chor Pe Mor -
  - "Woh Din Kab"
  - "Baj Uthe Ghungroo" with Amit Kumar
  - "Aur Sunao Kya Haal" with Amit Kumar
- College Girl -
  - "Dheere Dheere Raat Dhale"
  - "College Girl College Girl"
  - "College Girl College Girl (sad)"
- Danga Fasad - "Babushah O My Darling" with Amit Kumar
- Din Dahade -
  - "Ladi Ladi Jab Se Nazar" with Kumar Sanu
- Dushman -
  - "Mera Naam Sweet Sixteen" with Amit Kumar
  - "Yeh Jhilmil Qaatil Raaten" with Amit Kumar
- Ghar Ho To Aisa - "January February March April May Aur June July" with Mohammed Aziz
- Ghayal -
  - "Sochna Kya Jo Bhi Hoga Dekha Jaayega" with Kumar Sanu, and Shabbir Kumar
- Gunahon Ka Devta - "Hum Goa Ka Jenny Nahin"
- Haar Jeet -
  - "Teri Ghungroo Toot Gaye Toh Kya"
- Insaaf Ka Suraj - "Khat Aaya Ni Aaya Mere Natte Da"
- Is Paar Ya Us Paar -
  - "Hum Tum Ya Tum Hum" with Yunus Parvez
  - "Zambo Zambo" with Yunus Parvez, and Khokan Chowdhury
- Izzat Aabroo - "Main Apni Badan Ki Chandni"
- Jaan-e-Wafaa -
  - "Lehra Je Guzar Jaaye Hain"
  - "Raaz-e-Mohabbat Dil Mein Chhupana"
  - "Ab Toh Hum Hain Aur Yeh Ruswaiyan"
- Jai Shiv Shankar -
  - "Tu Andar Kaise Aaya" with Amit Kumar
  - "Lab Pe Tera Naam" with Mohammed Aziz
- Jeene Do -
  - "Boliya Oye Boliya, Aaja Raja" with Amit Kumar, and Suresh Wadkar
  - "Sari Raat Guzari Maine Dekhke Chand Ki Bindiya" with Babla Mehta
- Jurm - "Marne Ke Darr Se Mere Dil" with Mohammed Aziz
- Kaarnama -
  - "Ki Karan Dus Ki Karan" with Sushil Kumar
- Karishma Kali Kaa - "Sabhi Bhakton Ke Man Mein"
- Khatarnaak -
  - "Zindagi Ne Pukara Chale Aaye Hum"
- Kishen Kanhaiya - "Kuchh Ho Gaya, Kya Ho Gaya" with Mohammed Aziz
- Lohe Ke Haath -
  - "Humne Suna Hai, Tu Hai Daku" with Usha Khanna
  - "Dekhiye Jawani Ka Nasha Is Mein"
- Mayor Saab (Dubbed) -
  - "Chhora Chhori Dono Milk Ke" with Amit Kumar
  - "Dil Ke Saaz Mein" with Babla Mehta
- Naaka Bandi -
  - "Main Hoon Naughty Girl"
  - "Rekha Ko Dekha"
  - "Sun Sun Meri Soni" with Shabbir Kumar
- Phaansi Ka Phaanda - "Rangeen Hai Mehfil"
- Police Public -
  - "Chattaungi Chamche Se Chat"
  - "Bichhua Ne Das Liya"
  - "Fursat Mili Hai Aa Jao"
- Pyasi Nigahen - "Tu Hi Tu, Tu Hai Mera Pyaar"
- Roti Ki Keemat -
  - "Hathon Mein Choodi Khanke"
- Sailaab - "Mujhko Yeh Zindagi" with Amit Kumar
- Shatrutaa -
  - "Ho Gaya Bewafa Khid Naseeba"
  - "Mujhe Apna Bana Le"
- Shera Shamshera -
  - "Zalim Yeh Na Jaane"
  - "Ghungroo Baandh Liye"
- Shiva - "Marte Hai" with Suresh Wadkar
- Tejaa -
  - "Aage Aage Jaye Mera Dil"
- Thanedaar -
  - "Pehli Pehli Baar Aisa Thanedaar Aaya"
  - "Zulmi Saiyan Thanedaar"
  - "Jeena Hai Toh Hans Ke Jiyo (version 1)" with Amit Kumar
  - "Jeena Hai Toh Hans Ke Jiyo (version 2)" with Amit Kumar, and Reema Lahiri
  - "Jeena Hai Toh Hans Ke Jiyo (version 3)"
- Zimmedaaar - "Dilbar Dil Leke Dil De Do"
- Zooni -
  - "Allah Khair Allah Khair Maango Sab Ki" with Jaywant Kulkarni, Sunil Kumar, and Bhushan Mehta
  - "Allah Khair Allah Khair Maango Sab Ki (female)"
  - "Jeene Ki Koi Raah Dikhayi"
  - "Nazar Mein Noor Ki Shamma Jali"
  - "Rookh-e-Dildar Deedam Daras Ko"
  - "Shah-e-Mardaan, Sher-e-Yajdaan"
  - "Tere Bin Yeh Jeevan Kya Hai"
  - "Yeh Shamme Yeh Savere Jo Hain"

=== 1991 ===
- Aag Laga Do Sawan Ko -
  - "Pani O Paani"
  - "Tawaif Hoon, Dil Sab Ka Behlaaungi"
- Aaj Ka Samson - "Ek Bar Hans" with Meenakshi
- Afsana Pyar Ka -
  - "Nazren Mili" with Amit Kumar
  - "Tip Tip Tip Tip Baarish" with Amit Kumar
  - "Afsana Pyar Ka" with Udit Narayan
- Baat Hai Pyaar Ki -
  - "Preet Adhuri"
  - "Shikwa Bhi Nahi"
- Begunaah -
  - "Khareedaaron Bataao"
  - "Na Do Humko Ilzaam"
- Dushman Devta - "Pyar Ke Ghar Mere"
- First Love Letter -
  - "Kambal Na Hatao, Mujhe Lagta Hai Darr" with S. P. Balasubrahmanyam
- Garajna‌ -
  - "Pyar Kiya Phir Gham Hai Kya" with Mohammed Aziz
  - "Mushkil Nahin Pani Ki Dhaar" with Kishore Kumar
- Gunehgar Kaun -
  - "Aapko Main Gul Kehke Utha Loon Jab Kahiye" with Shailendra Singh
  - "Na Sanam (Female)"
  - "Rona Mujhe Aata Hai Re"
- Hafta Bandh - "Kyun Soch Mein" with Amit Kumar
- Indrajeet -
  - "Ab To Humko Ek Duje Ka" with Amit Kumar
  - "Main Khule Aam Keh Doon" with Amit Kumar
  - "Main Na Jhooth Boloon" with Amit Kumar
- Insaaf Ka Khoon -
  - "Farebi Lootere Awaara Lafange Behaya" with Vinod Sehgal
  - "Tere Bin Dil Dhadakta Hai" with Vinod Sehgal
  - "Tere Mere Pyar Ki Baat Phail Gayi Zamane Mein" with Vinod Sehgal
- Inspector Kiron - "Aisa Lagta Hai"
- Jhoothi Shaan -
  - "Rim Zim Rim Zim Barse Sawan" with Amit Kumar
  - "Janu Janu Thari Yaari" with Shailendra Singh
  - "Jo Aap Aaye Bahar Laye" with Amit Kumar, and Chandrani Mukherjee
  - "Dil Mere Lehra Le" with Suresh Wadkar
- Jigarwala -
  - "Aisa Lagta Tha Yeh Bairi Sawan Chala Jayega" with Amit Kumar
  - "Hum To Hain Teen Bhai" with Amit Kumar
  - "Chale Hain Barati Ban Thanke" with Shabbir Kumar
- Kohraam - "Jab Nadiyan Meri"
- Lakshmanrekha -
  - "Yeh Sitam"
- Lekin... - "Jhoothe Naina"
- Naamcheen -
  - "Log Zamane Mein"
- Numbri Aadmi - "Chham Chham Bole Mere Ghunghroo"
- Pratikar -
  - "Chitthi Mujhe Likhna" with Amit Kumar
  - "Kaali Zulfen Gore Gaal" with Mohammed Aziz
- Pyaar Ka Saaya -
  - "Teri Dosti Se Mila Hai Mujhe" with Kumar Sanu
  - "Har Ghadi Mere Pyaar Ka Saya (duet)" with Kumar Sanu
- Pyaar Ka Saudagar -
  - "Tera Dil Mere Dil Pe Fit Ho Gaya" with Kumar Sanu
  - "Jaanam Mere Jaanam"
- Qurbani Rang Layegi -
  - "Tirchhi Nazar Ka Mara Teer Topiwale Ne" with Shabbir Kumar
  - "Abhi Abhi Taaza Taaza Mili Hai Khabar" with Shabbir Kumar
- Raiszaada -
  - "Nashe Ki Botal" with Shabbir Kumar
  - "Pehle Aankh Lad Gayee" with Mohammed Aziz
- Rupaye Dus Karod -
  - "Jhatka O Haay Jhatka" with Sudesh Bhosle
  - "Ram Kare Toot Jaaye Rail Gaadi"
- Sau Crore - "Desi Dhun, Videsi Taal" with Kumar Sanu, and Udit Narayan
- Swayam -
  - "Maine Har Haal Mein"
- Vishnu-Devaa - "Dil Tera Assi Tere Hai Deewane" with Mohammed Aziz
- Yodha -
  - "Ladka Kunwara"

=== 1992 ===
- Balwaan - "Assa Dil Tere Kadman" with Arun Bakshi
- Bandhu -
  - "Chalo Chale Saathiyan" with Kumar Sanu
  - "Kaun Ho Mere Tum" with Danny Denzongpa
  - "Ek Jyoti Chita Se Jalakar"
- Bekhudi -
  - "Aa Khel Khelen Hum, Ek Khel Khelen Hum" with Kumar Sanu
  - "Khat Maine Tere Naam Likha, Haal-E-Dil Tamaam Likha" with Kumar Sanu
  - "Mujhe Kya Pata Tera Ghar Hai Kahan" with Kumar Sanu
  - "Daddy Mummy Meri Shaadi Karwa Rahe Hain" with Kumar Sanu
  - "Dekhke Yeh Rumal Mujhe Yaad Karna (Happy)" with Kumar Sanu
  - "Dekhke Yeh Rumal Mujhe Yaad Karna (Sad)"
- Bewaffa Se Waffa -
  - "Aa Mere Paas, O Meri Jaan"
  - "Waise To Zamane Mein"
- Bombay Ka Raja - "Ruby Mera Naam"
- Chamatkar -
  - "Yeh Hai Pyar Pyar" with Kumar Sanu
  - "Bichhoo O Bichhoo"
- Daisy - "Do Panchhi"
- Daman -
  - "Din Dhalte Hi Dil Doobne Lagta Hai"
  - "Manjar Tarah Tarah Ke Daman" with Abhijeet Bhattacharya
- Deewana Aashiq -
  - "Tu Bhi Hai Hai Beqaraar"
  - "Sunn Sunn Mere"
  - "Pyaar Kuchh Bhi Ho" with Shabbir Kumar, and Shailendra Singh
- Dil Ka Kya Kasoor -
  - "Milne Ki Tum Koshish Karna" with Kumar Sanu
  - "Mera Sanam Sabse Pyara Hai" with Kumar Sanu
- Drohi -
  - "Panchi Gaaye Re"
  - "Aise Hamen Dekho"
  - "Dooba Dooba" with Jolly Mukherjee
- Insaaf Ki Devi -
  - "Yeh Haseen Raat"
  - "Kashmir Se Leke"
  - "Sun Mere Sajna"
  - "Tumbi Tumbi" with Amit Kumar
- Isi Ka Naam Zindagi - "Aiyo Arre Aiyo Bina Paas Aaye More"
- Jai Kaali -
  - "Chude Baje" with Usha Khanna
- Jaan Tere Naam - "Hum Laakh Chhupaye Pyaar Magar" with Kumar Sanu
- Kal Ki Awaaz -
  - "Hamare Khwabo Ke Anjuman Mein"
  - "Jabse Dekha Tumko Mere Dil Ne Kaha" with Kumar Sanu
  - "Kar Na Sake Hum Pyar Ka Sauda" with Kumar Sanu
  - "Kisi Meharban Ne Aake Meri Zindagi Saja Di" with Kumar Sanu
  - "Kyu Ladkiya Humse Ye Raaz Chhupati Hai" with Kumar Sanu
  - "Tumhari Nazron Mein Humne Dekha" with Kumar Sanu
- Karm Yoddha - "Uff Ye Kya Hua" with Mohammed Aziz
- Khel -
  - "Ek Baat Maan Lo Tum (version 1)"
  - "Ek Baat Maan Lo Tum (version 2)"
- Khiladi -
- Khule-Aam -
  - "Kaam Kisi Ke Koi Aye Na" with Gautam Roy
  - "Parbat Se Neeche Gira Du" with Gautam Roy
  - "Pehle Pehle Pyar Hua" with Gautam Roy
- Laat Saab - "Battiya Bujhegi"
- Lambu Dada -
  - "Teri Zindagi Hai" with Sadhana Sargam
- Maarg - "Mere Mehboob Aa"
- Mere Meherban -
  - "Aapse Pyaar Hua" with S. P. Choudhary
  - "Tere Kaale Baal" with Kumar Sanu
- Naseebwala -
  - "Mere Bhaiya Ki Saali" with Mohammed Aziz
  - "Yere Yere Pavsa" with Amit Kumar
- Panaah - "De De Na Mujhko Mere Yaar"
- Pyar Hua Badnam -
  - "Main Prem Nagar Ka Raja" with Shabbir Kumar
  - "Is Jahan Se Us Jahaan" with Nitin Mukesh
- Sachcha Pyar - "Mere Liye Tu" with S. P. Balasubrahmanyam
- Sarphira -
  - "Deewane O Deewane"
  - "Khwab Dekh Dekhke Zindagi Guzar Gayi" with Mohammed Aziz
  - "Sardi Zukham Ka Hai Ek Hi Ilaj" with Suresh Wadkar
  - "Meri Honewali Bhabhi, Tumhe Dena Hoga Vaada" with Amit Kumar
- Siyasat - "Masti Ke Hai Din Chaar"
- Suryavanshi -
  - "Main Nahin Kehta" with Kumar Sanu
  - "Jogi Tere Pyar Mein" with Udit Narayan
  - "Tu Hi Mere Dil Ka Jaani" with Mangal Singh
- Tyagi - "Mujhko To Kuch Kuch Hota Hai" with Kumar Sanu
- Vansh -
  - "Sard Mausam, Bheega Tan Hai"
- Virodhi -
  - "Nain Kabootar Ud Gaye Dono" with Kumar Sanu
  - "Jaanam Jaanam Jaanam" with Kumar Sanu
- Yeh Raat Phir Na Aayegi - "Jaanu Na Main Ye Kya Hua" with Anwar
- Zakhmi Rooh -
  - "Ang Se Ang Mila Le"
  - "Kisne Samjha Kisne Jaana"
  - "Tu Hain Mera, Main Hoon Teri" with Amit Kumar
- Zindagi Ek Juaa -
  - "Yeh Zindagi Hai (female)"
  - "Dil To Dil Hai (female)"
  - "Na Ja Re Na Ja Pardes"
- Zulm Ki Hukumat -
  - "Hum Aap Ki Zulfon Se Khele" with Amit Kumar

=== 1993 ===
- Aaina -
  - "Aaina Hai Mera Chehra" with Lata Mangeshkar, and Suresh Wadkar
  - "Meri Saanson Mein Tum, Dil Ki Dhadkan Mein Tum" with Kumar Sanu
  - "Saansen Behki"
- Aankhen - "Ek Tamanna Jeevan Ki" with Kumar Sanu
- Aasoo Bane Angaarey -
  - "Dil Bas Mein Nahin"
- Andha Intaquam - "Ruk Jaa Zara Tu, Ae Jaaneman" with Udit Narayan
- Apaatkaal -
  - "Hum Bhi Tum Bhi" with Mohammed Aziz
  - "Mehandi Ni Mehandi" with Sadhana Sargam
- Baazigar - "Kitaabe Bahut Si" with Vinod Rathod
- Balmaa -
  - "Mere Khayaal Se Tum" with Nitin Mukesh
  - "Agar Jindagi Ho To Tere Sang Ho" with Kumar Sanu
  - "Meri Saheliyon Mere Saath Aao" with Kumar Sanu
  - "Mehandi Se Likh Gori"
- Bhookamp - "Tan Man Mile To"
- Bonny -
  - "Jaaneman Jaanejaan" with Binju Ali
  - "Dhun Ki Mein" with Binju Ali
  - "Khelo Na" with Binju Ali
- Dil Ne Ikraar Kiya -
  - "Chhoone Se Tere" with Anu Malik
  - "Waapas Kar Do Meri Neend" with Suresh Wadkar
- Divya Shakti -
  - "O Mere Gudde Raja" with Kumar Sanu
  - "Aao Na Mujhse Pyar Karo"
- Gardish -
  - "Ae Mere Deewanon" with S. P. Balasubrahmanyam
  - "Yeh Mera Dil To Pagal Hai" with S. P. Balasubrahmanyam
  - "Rang Rangeeli Raat Gaaye" with S. P. Balasubrahmanyam
  - "Tum Jo Mile" with M. G. Sreekumar
  - "Badal Jo Barse"
- Geetanjali - "I Love You"
- Gumrah -
  - "Yeh Hai Sharabkhana"
- Gurudev -
  - "Mera Kaha Manoge"
  - "Aaja, Sunle Sada, Tu Hai Kahan Jaan-E-Wafa" with R D Burman
  - "Jaipur Se Nikli Gaadi Dilli Chale Halle Halle" with Shailendra Singh
  - "Aana Re, Aana Re, Dil Hai Deewana Re" with Shailendra Singh, and Amit Kumar
- Jaan Pe Khelkar - "Aaj Ki Raat"
- Jeena Nahin Bin Tere -
  - "Parda Utha Toh"
- Jeevan Ki Shatranj - "O Jaan-E-Jaana"
- Kala Coat -
  - "Tadpake Woh Bhi Tadpe Hain" with Mohammed Rafi
- Kanyadaan -
  - "Dekho Dus Baj Gaye Hain" with Mukul Agarwal
  - "Maina Bol Rahi" with Kumar Sanu
- King Uncle - "Fenny Ne Mujhe Bulaya" with Sudesh Bhosle
- Lootere -
  - "Aa Ja Aanewale Aaja"
- Meera Ke Girdhar -
  - "Mere Hai Girdhar Gopal"
  - "Babul Ka Ghar Chod Ke Gori"
  - "Bhulkar Reet Sari"
  - "Saj Dhaj Ke Main To Doli Chadhungi"
  - "Radha Ko Mila Jaise Krishan (part 2)"
  - "Radha Ko Mila Jaise Kishan (part 1)"
- Meri Aan -
  - "Bewafa Ajnabi (version 1)" with Kumar Sanu
  - "Bewafa Ajnabi (version 2)" with Kumar Sanu
  - "Is Nazar Ne Kabhi Pehle Dekhi Na Thi" with Kumar Sanu
- Nargis - "O Jaanejaana Qurbana" with Naseeruddin Shah
- Pehla Nasha -
  - "Aaj Raat Bas Mein (part 1)"
  - "Aaj Raat Bas Mein (part 2)"
  - "Nadiya Kinare" with Vinod Rathod
  - "Pyar Ki Raat" with Vinod Rathod
  - "Tu Hai Haseena" with Vinod Rathod
- Police Wala - "Kaun Hai Asli" with Amit Kumar
- Pyaar Ka Tarana -
  - "Love Letter, Love Letter" with S. P. Balasubrahmanyam, and Udit Narayan
  - "Jane Ke Liye Kaise Kahoon" with S. P. Balasubrahmanyam
  - "Tumse Milke Humdum" with S. P. Balasubrahmanyam
- Pyar Hua Dheere Dheere - "Main Toh Seh Na Sakungi" with Suresh Wadkar
- Rudaali -
  - "Samay O Dheere Chalo (part 1)"
- Sainik - "Meri Wafayein Yaad Karoge" with Kumar Sanu
- Shaktiman -
  - "Meri Haath Ki Choodi Bole" with Udit Narayan
  - "Haule Haule Dil Doongi"
  - "Sun Goriye" with Channi Singh
- Shreeman Aashique - "Bade Be-Sharam Ladki" with Annu Kapoor
- Tum Karo Vaada -
  - "Tujhe Pyaar Karne Se" with Kumar Sanu
  - "Ise Pyaar Kahiye Ya Deewangi" with Kumar Sanu
  - "Tum Karo Vaada" with Kumar Sanu
- Tahqiqaat - "Doob Gaye Mere Nain Saajan" with Vinod Rathod
- Veerta -
  - "Na Na Na Jana" with Kumar Sanu
  - "O Choodhewali" with Kumar Sanu
  - "Sha Ra Ra Ra" with Mangal Singh
- Waqt Hamara Hai - "Kachchi Kali Kachnar Todi Nahin Jaati" with Kumar Sanu
- Zakhmo Ka Hisaab -
  - "Pehle Aap Kaha, Phir Tum Kaha" with Mohammed Aziz

=== 1994 ===
- Andaz Apna Apna - "Yeh Raat Aur Yeh Doori" with S. P. Balasubrahmanyam
- Andhera -
  - "Nazron Ko Takrane De"
- Baali Umar Ko Salaam -
  - "Darte Darte Tum Kaho Kuch" with Kumar Sanu
  - "Chupke Teri Aankhon Mein" with Udit Narayan
- Beta Ho Toh Aisa - "Teri Zinda Dilli Mujhe Maar Gayi"
- Bhairav Dweep -
  - "Babua O Babua"
  - "Sun Ri Sakhi Basant Aaya"
- Brahma - "Naam Jiska Zindadili Hai"
- Chaand Kaa Tukdaa -
  - "Aaja Deewane Aaja Le Chal Aakar Sabko"
  - "Darwaja Khula Rakhna Mera Yaar Aa Raha Hai"
  - "Jo Peete Nahin Sharab" with Jolly Mukherjee
  - "Tu Ladka Hai London Ka, Main Ladki Hindustani" with Vipin Sachdeva
- Do Fantoosh - "Aaj Chhatri Ki Chhaon Mein" with Shabbir Kumar
- Ganga Aur Ranga -
  - "Ek Din Aisa"
  - "Ghoonghroo Toot Gaye"
  - "Tu Jhootha Teri Kasmein Jhoothi"
  - "Yaar Manaoon"
- Gangster -
  - "Gangster Gangster" with Kumar Sanu
  - "Ek Ladki Mili (version 1)" with Udit Narayan
  - "Ek Ladki Mili (version 2)" with Udit Narayan
- Ghar Ki Izzat - "Mausam Yeh Suhana Hai" with Udit Narayan
- Hanste Khelte -
  - "Darwaza Kaahe Bandh Kiya" with Sudesh Bhosle
- Insaniyat - "Saare Ladke Kare Toh" with Shabbir Kumar
- Janam Se Pehle -
  - "Aye Mere Humsafar"
- Jazbaat -
  - "Dil Udta Hai" with Sameer Date
  - "Ek Tu Haseen" with Sameer Date
  - "Khushiyan Manane Ki Raat"
- Khudai -
  - "Haye Re Kismat Humein Kahan Layi"
  - "Kehti Hai Bindiya"
- Main Khiladi Tu Anari - "Lakhon Haseen" with Kumar Sanu
- Path-Bhrashta -
  - "Chahat Bina Haya Kya" with Roop Kumar Rathod
- Pyaara Sangam - "Gham Tere Hum"
- Rakhwale -
  - "Sohni Dekhi Sassi Dekhi" with Udit Narayan
  - "Woh Din Na Rahe Toh"
- Salaami - "Chehra Kya Dekhte Ho" with Kumar Sanu
- Vaade Iraade -
  - "Dil Nashin Hai"
- Zamane Se Kya Darna -
  - "Yaara Yaara Yaara"

=== 1995 ===
- Adhuri Dulhan - "Main Mar Jaoon Toh"
- Dil Ka Doctor -
  - "Upar Se Dekha"
- Dilwale Dulhaniya Le Jayenge - "Zara Sa Jhoom Loon Main" with Abhijeet Bhattacharya
- Fauji -
  - "Mera Naam Reshma"
- Kalyug Ke Avtaar - "Soone Soone Se Jeevan" with Suresh Wadkar
- Karmo Ki Sazaa -
  - "Dhak Dhak Dhak" with Kumar Sanu
  - "Reason Reason" with Kumar Sanu
  - "Kitna Pyaar Hai" with Udit Narayan
- Param Vir Chakra -
  - "Tujh Pe Qurban" with Ravindra Jain
  - "Mere Mehboob Mere Watan" with Kumar Sanu, Suresh Wadkar, and Mohammed Aziz
- Policewala Gunda - "Kangana Khanak Khanak"
- Rangeela -
  - "Rangeela Re" with Aditya Narayan
  - "Tanha Tanha Yahaan Pe Jeena"
- Saajan Ki Baahon Mein - "Purab Se Chali" with Kumar Sanu
- Sanam Harjai -
  - "Jaane Kaun Thi Haseena" with Abhijeet Bhattacharya
- Sarhad - "Doodh Ban Jaoongi"
- Sauda -
  - "Koi Dil Na Kisise Lagaye" with Sonu Nigam
- Vartmaan -
  - "Jhumka Kajra Bindiya"
  - "Kabhi Tum Sanam Ho" with Kumar Sanu
  - "Rumba Rumba, Tu Jo Mera Yaar Bane" with Kumar Sanu
  - "Tujhe Main Dil Kahoon" with Vipin Sachdeva
- Zulm Ka Jawab -
  - "Aa Re Aa Zara Ab Der Kya" with Shailendra Singh

=== 1996 ===
- Aatank -
  - "Main Door Chali"
  - "Meri Jawani"
  - "Kya Raat Hai" with Jolly Mukherjee
- Armaan -
  - "Main Dilwalon Ki Tamanna"
  - "Yeh Haseen Wadiyaan"
- Aur Ek Prem Kahani -
  - "Hona Hai To Ho Hi Jayega" with Mano
  - "Naina Bole Naina (part 1)"
  - "Naina Bole Naina (part 2)"
  - "Meri Zindagi Mile Kya Kab Yaha Hai"
- Aurat Aurat Aurat - "Bolo Jai Seeta Ram"
- Bal Bramhachari -
  - "Zara Chhu Ke Toh Dikha"
- Daayraa -
  - "Bolo Kya Tum, Bas Itna Sa"
  - "Palkon Pe Chalte Chalte (female)"
- Dushman Duniya Ka - "Darwaza Kaahe Bandh Kiya" with Sudesh Bhosle
- English Babu Desi Mam -
  - "Kaise Mukhde Se Nazrein Hataun"
- Ghatak: Lethal - "Aaki Naaki"
- Khel Khiladi Ka -
  - "Pakka Dilbar Jaani" with Udit Narayan
- Kisi Se Dil Laga Ke Dekho -
  - "Tere Naina Neend Churaye" with Mohammed Aziz
  - "Pyaar Ki Kitaab Khol De" with Amit Kumar
- Megha - "Suna Hai Ji Jijaji"
- Raja Ki Aayegi Baraat -
  - "Ankhein Ladi Tumse" with Kumar Sanu
- Return of Jewel Thief -
  - "Shaher Mein Shor"
  - "O Jaan Jaan Jaani" with Vinod Rathod
- Sapoot -
  - "Kajal Kajal" with Amit Kumar
  - "Tukur Tukur" with Amit Kumar
- Sardrai Begum -
  - "More Kanha Jo Aaye"
  - "Chaahe Maar Dalo Raja"
- Sautela Bhai -
  - "Sajan Sajan"
  - "Chahe Poochh Lo" with Babla Mehta

=== 1997 ===
- Agnichakra - "Paisa Hi Paisa"
- Aakhri Sanghursh -
  - "Woh Sharaab Hai"
  - "Nasha Hi Nasha Hai"
  - "Aanchal Pe Tera Hi Naam Likha" with Mohammed Rafi
  - "Diya Dil Tujhko Diya" with Kishore Kumar
- Aar Ya Paar -
  - "Aar Ya Paar (Female)"
  - "Dil Diya, Pyar Kiya" with Sudesh Bhosle
- Anjaane - "Sun Ai Master" with Mohammed Aziz
- Aur Pyaar Ho Gaya -
  - "Jaagi Hui Fizayein" with Udit Narayan
  - "Thoda Sa Pagla Thoda Siyaana"
- Betaabi - "Tumhari Khushboo" with Suresh Wadkar
- Chachi 420 -
  - "Jago Gori" with Kamal Haasan, and Shruti Haasan
  - "Gare Dore" with Hariharan
- Chand Grahan - "Kyun Khoon Baha"
- Daadagiri -
  - "Gore Rang Ka Hai Zamana" with Udit Narayan
- Daava - "Kyun Aanchal Hamara"
- Darmiyaan -
  - "Pighalta Hua Ye Sama" with Udit Narayan
  - "Main Juari Hoon"
  - "Nadiya Pe Lehre Lehro Pe Naiya"
  - "Dekh Lu Jo Nazar Bhar Ke"
  - "Shina Gore Hazy Hazy Bobling" with Sudesh Bhosle
  - "Sa Ra Ra Ra Ra" with Sudesh Bhosle
- Daud -
  - "Zehreela Pyar" with Deena Chandra Das
  - "O Bhavre" with K. J. Yesudas
  - "Oh! Sai Yaiye" with S. P. Balasubrahmanyam
- Dil To Pagal Hai - "Dil Le Gayi Le Gayi"
- Dus -
  - " Sur Mile Hain" with Udit Narayan, and Shankar Mahadevan
- Ghoonghat -
  - "Ladki Hai Bholi" with Udit Narayan
  - "Gore Gore Paon Mein" with S. P. Balasubrahmanyam
- Krishna Arjun - "Namaste Ji" with Abhijeet Bhattacharya, and Nitesh Raj
- Lav Kush -
  - "Nanha Munha Aayega Mehmaan" with Usha Mangeshkar
- Police Station -
  - "De De Dil De De" with Udit Narayan
  - "Dilli Se Mangwaya Anokhe Chudiyan"
  - "Mere Sone Ka Badan"
- Sajana Doli Leke Aana - "Teri Meri Hogi Shaadi" with Vinod Rathod
- Salma Pe Dil Aa Gaya -
  - "Zara Dholaki Bajaao Goriyo" with Udit Narayan
  - "Salma Pe Dil Aa Gaya (version 1)" with Udit Narayan, and Amit Kumar
  - "Salma Pe Dil Aa Gaya (version 2)" with Kumar Sanu, and Amit Kumar

=== 1998 ===
- Akrosh - "Madhosh Ho Gaya Main" with Abhijeet Bhattacharya
- Badmaash -
  - "Naam Chhalka-e-Jaam"
- Dand Nayak - "Aa Piya Aa Oiya, Meri Gali Aaja" with Udit Narayan
- Dushman -
  - "Hippy Hippy Ya" with Shankar Mahadevan
- Ghar Bazar - "Dil Ki Awaaz Hai Main Teri Ho Gayi"
- Hitler -
  - "Haseen Sama Hai" with Abhijeet Bhattacharya
- Kabhi Na Kabhi - "Mere Fil Ka Woh Shehzada"
- Mil Gayee Manzil Mujhe -
  - "Ja Main Tose Rooth Gayi"
  - "Janam Kahin Na Jaya Karo"
  - "Tum Jo Mile To Phool Khile" with Kishore Kumar
  - "Yeh Zindagi Ka Fasana Hai Kya" with Kishore Kumar
  - "Ek Taraf Tum, Ek Taraf Hum" with Kishore Kumar, and Shailendra Singh
- Pyaar To Hona Hi Tha -
  - "Ajnabi Mujhko Itna Bataa De" with Udit Narayan
  - "Aashiq Hoon Main" with Udit Narayan
  - "Jo Hona Hai" with Mohammad Aziz, Sudesh Bhosle, Vinod Rathod, and Bali Brahmabhatt
- Qila - "Ankhiyan Teh Ankhiyan" with Udit Narayan
- Satya -
  - "Sapne Mein Milta Hai" with Suresh Wadkar
- Sham Ghansham - "Prem Mein Paagal Ho Gayi Meera" with Suresh Wadkar, Vishwajeet, and Brahmacharya
- Swami Vivekananda -
  - "Sanyasi Talaasi Jiski Hai" with K. J. Yesudas
- Yugpurush -
  - "Koi Jaise Mere Dil Ka"

=== 1999 ===
- Akeli - "Kya Ajeeb Sheh Haye Yeh Zindagi"
- Dil Ka Sauda -
  - "Kya Sama Hai Kya Husn Hai"
- Double Gadbad -
  - "Holey Holey" with Baba Sehgal
  - "Main Deewana" with Baba Sehgal
  - "Sainya Sainya" with Baba Sehgal
- Hindustan Ki Kasam - "Tere Dil Ke Paas" with Sonu Nigam
- Lal Baadshah -
  - "Koi Hai Dil Denewala" with Sudesh Bhosle
- Mast -
  - "Hey Rama Krishna Govinda Gopala"
  - "Na Govinda Na Shah Rukh"
  - "Main Tere Dil Ki Malika" with Sonu Nigam
- Pyaar Koi Khel Nahin - "Apni To Life Mein"
- Split Wide Open -
  - "Jaane Na Koi"
- Taal - "Kahin Aag Lage" with Aditya Narayan, and Richa Sharma
- Takshak -
  - "Mujhe Rang De"
- Zulmi -
  - "Teri Badmashiyan Aur Meri" with Udit Narayan
  - "Bhool Se Humne Bhool Ki (Happy)" with Kumar Sanu
  - "Mere Liye To Fit Hai Tu" with Amit Kumar
  - "Zulmi Toone Zulm Kiya"
  - "Bhool Se Humne Bhool Ki (Sad)"
  - "Sapne Mein Aake Loot Gaya"
  - "Phir Chand Se"

== 2000s ==
=== 2000 ===
- Agniputra - "Solah Baras Intezaar Kar Liya"
- Fiza -
  - "Badtamizi Pe Hum Aa Gaye Toh, Aankh Milaoongi"
- Dil Pe Mat Le Yaar! - "Dil Pe Mat Le Yaar"
- Gang -
  - "Chhodke Na Jaana"
- Hey Ram - "Janmon Ki Jwala" with Hariharan
- Kaho Naa... Pyaar Hai -
  - "Janeman Janeman"
- Karobaar - "Duniya Mein Sabse" with Kumar Sanu, and Udit Narayan
- Khauff -
  - "Naach Baby Naach Kudi" with Daler Mehndi
- Le Chal Apne Sang - "Haseena Haseena" with Udit Narayan
- Pyaase Honth -
  - "Chalo Do Dilon Ki Mohabbat Ke Naam"
  - "Dilwale O Dilwale"
  - "Kisi Ne Poochha Main Kya Bechti Hoon"
  - "Nikli Jo Koi Lehar"
- Shikari -
  - "Bheja Hai Ek Gulaab" with Kumar Sanu

=== 2001 ===
- Do Yaar -
  - "Ankhon Mein Masti Hai"
  - "Yeh Gajra Tujhe Bulaaye"
- Grahan -
  - "Yeh Sochta Hai" with Hariharan
  - "Chup Chup" with Abhijeet
  - "Aaj Main Khush" with Abhijeet
- Lagaan - "Radha Kaise Na Jale"
- Love Ke Liye Kuch Bhi Karega -
  - "Rama Rama" with Sonu Nigam
  - "Socho Kya Karogi" with KK
- Pyaar Tune Kya Kiya -
  - "Kambakht Ishq" with Sonu Nigam, and Sukhwinder Singh
  - "Kambakht Ishq (remix)" with Sonu Nigam, and Sukhwinder Singh
- Raat Ke Sauagar -
  - "Mere Khayalon Mein" with Kumar Sanu
  - "Hai Ishq Ab"
  - "Logon Ne Kaha" with Mohammed Aziz
- Shirdi Sai Baba - "Dwarakami Tere Angan Mein"
- Yaadein -
  - "Jab Dil Miley" with Udit Narayan, Sukhwinder Singh, and Sunidhi Chauhan

=== 2002 ===
- Anita and Me - "Gunguna Rahe Hain Bhawre" with Mohammed Rafi
- Aakhir Kaun Thi Woh -
  - "Ganpati Bappa Morya" with Suresh Wadkar
- Be-Lagaam - "Mehfil Mein Aaya Hai"
- Chhal -
  - "Dil Jhanjhana Le"
- Company -
  - "Khallas" with Sudesh Bhosle, and Sapna Awasthi
  - "Khallas (remix)" with Sudesh Bhosle, and Sapna Awasthi
- Filhaal... - "Filhaal"
- Hathyar -
  - "Thamba Re Thamba, Rok Teekhi Najariya" with Mohammad Salamat
  - "Nazar Nazar Mein Haal-e-Dil Ka Pataa Chalta Hai" with Mohammad Salamat
- Inth Ka Jawaab Paththar -
  - "Rajai Odh Ke" with Udit Narayan
  - "Ik Ladke Pe Aa Gaya Hai" with Udit Narayan
- Kranti - "Jung Ho Ya Pyaar"
- Maa Tujhe Salaam -
  - "Sone Ke Jaisi Hai Meri Jawaani"
- Mere Yaar Ki Shaadi Hai - "Sharara Sharara" with Sonu Nigam
- Mujhse Dosti Karoge! -
  - "Mujhse Dosti Karoge!" with Alka Yagnik, and Udit Narayan
- Rishtey - "Dilbar Dilbar"
- Saathiya -
  - "Chori Pe Chori" with Karthik, and Blaaze
- Soch -
  - "Dil Dhoonde" with KK

=== 2003 ===
- Aapko Pehle Bhi Kahin Dekha Hai - "Aisi Aankhen Nahin Dekhi" with Jagjit Singh
- Bhoot -
  - "Bhoot Hai Yahan Koi"
  - "Dead But Not Asleep"
- Chupke Se - "Kehte Kehte Ruk Jaati Hai" with Lucky Ali
- Escape From Taliban -
  - "Kahan Se Aate Hai" with Sunidhi Chauhan
- Footpath - "Chain Aapko Mila" with S. P. Balasubrahmanyam
- Joggers' Park -
  - "Habba Habba Hui"
- Khwahish -
  - "Baila Baila"
  - "Rang Raliyan"
  - "Sapnon Mein"
  - "Hum Dono Hain Khoye" with Udit Narayan
  - "Gungunati Hai" with Udit Narayan
  - "Jaaneman" with KK
- Kyon? -
  - "Badalon Ki Oat Mein (female)"
  - "Jaa Re Jaa"
- Paanch - "Jism Hai"
- Sandhya -
  - "Maar Gayo Re (version 2)"
- Satta -
  - "Gungunaati Hai, Geet Gaati Hai (female)"
  - "More Saiyan Bhaye Kotwal"
- Tehzeeb -
  - "Meherbaan" with Sukhwinder Singh

=== 2004 ===
- Dev - "Meri Justuju Bhi Tu Hai" with Aadesh Shrivastava
- Kis Kis Ki Kismat -
  - "Talk of The Town"
- Kuchh To Gadbad Hai - "Makn Bhi Jawaan, Tu Bhi Jawaan" with Sonu Nigam
- Lakeer -
  - "Offho Jalta Hai" with Sonu Nigam
- Meenaxi - "Dhuan"
- Thoda Tum Badlo Thoda Hum -
  - "Uff Yumma" with KK
- Yeh Lamhe Judaai Ke -
  - "Tum Paas Ho Jab Mere" with Kumar Sanu
  - "Mere Dil Ko Kare Bekaboo" with Udit Narayan

=== 2005 ===
- Ankhon Mein Sapne Liye - "Maria"
- Bewafaa - music composed by Nadeem-Shravan
  - "Kehta Hai Kabutar Kya" with Shaan
- Bhagmati - "Jiya Jaye Amma" with Roop Kumar Rathod
- Double Cross -
  - "Nahin Nahin Abhi Nahin" with Kishore Kumar
  - "Jaanu Meri Jaan" with Kishore Kumar, Mohammed Rafi, and Usha Mangeshkar
- Koi Mere Dil Mein Hai - "Bahon Mein Nahin Rehna" with Adnan Sami
- Lucky: No Time for Love -
  - "Lucky Lips"
  - "Lucky Lips (Bulsoi Mix)"
- Mahiya: Call of Love - "Aaja Meri Bahon Mein Aa"
- Page 3 -
  - "Huzoor-e-Ala" with Abhijeet Bhattacharya

=== 2006 ===
- Aatma - "Ishq Hua Mujhe"
- Corporate -
  - "Lamha Lamha Zindagi Hai"
  - "Lamha Lamha Zindagi Hai (sad)"
- Sandwich - "Hum Tum Hai Tanhai Hai" with Sonu Nigam
- Teesri Aankh -
  - "Sharabiyon"
- Utthaan - "Yeh Kaisa Utthaan Hai (female)"
- Yatra -
  - "Jaam-e-Mohabbat Aankhon Se Hi"
  - "Madhur Madhur Door Koyi Bansuri Bajaaye"

=== 2007 ===
- 50 Lakh - "Jaane Jaane Jaana"
- Aap Kaa Surroor - The Real Luv Story -
  - "Mehbooba O Mehbooba (A Tribute to Panchamda) " with Himesh Reshammiya (Originally composed by R.D. Burman)
- Bal Ganesh -
  - "Nanha Munna Bal Ganesh" with Usha Mangeshkar
  - "Teeno Lok Me Pooja Jaye" with Aneek Dhar, and Amanat Ali
- Dhamaal -
  - "Chandni Raat Hai Saiyan" with Amit Kumar

=== 2008 ===
- 1920 - "Aise Jalta Hai Jiya"
- Don Muthu Swami -
  - "Saath Saath Tum Chalo" with Bhupinder Singh
- Mr. Black Mr. White -
  - "Tu Makke Di Roti" with Mika Singh, and Daler Mehndi
  - "Tu Makke Di Roti (Alternate Dance Mix)" with Mika Singh, and Daler Mehndi
- Yaar Meri Zindagi -
  - "Naache Mera Pyar"
  - "Piya Tore Nanoya Ke"
  - "Pyara Ye Rishta Hai Mera"
  - "Raja Ke Aangna Aaye"

== 2010s ==
Year	Film	Song	Composer(s)	Writer(s)	Co-artist(s)
2011	Chargesheet	"Sapnon ki Hoon Main Rani"	Sanjay Jaydeep	Anant Joshi	solo
2011	Chargesheet	"Har Dil Akela"	AD Boyz	N/A	solo
2011	Ragini MMS	"Raat Akeli Hai"	S. D. Burman	Majrooh Sultanpuri	solo
2011	Tanu Weds Manu Returns	"Kajra Mohabbatwala"	O. P. Nayyar	S. H. Bihari	Shamshad Begum
2013	Hai Golmaal In White House	"Dil Lagane Ko Jab Dil"	Shamir Tandon		solo
2013	Mai	"Mai (Title Song)"	Manoj Tapadia	Nitin R Shankar	solo
2013	Mai	"Chanda Ki Bindiya"	Manoj Tapadia	Nitin R Shankar	solo
2013	Sona Spa	"Neend Ka Bijness"	Shamir Tandon	Sameer	Sudesh Bhosle
2014	Darr Ke Aage Jeet Hai	"Shikh Ishaare Mast Nazaare" (female)	N/A	N/A	solo
2014	Enough Is Enough	"Kayamat Se Pehle Kayamat Hai Aayi"	Arshad Ahmed	Shahid Hamdani	solo
2014	Kaash Tum Hote	"Betaab Tamanna Thi"	Vinay Tiwari	Shabbir Ahmed	Sonu Nigam
2014	Queen	"Hungama Ho Gaya" (remix)	Laxmikant–Pyarelal, Amit Trivedi	Verma Malik	Arijit Singh
2014	Revolver Rani	"Kaafi Nahin Chand"	Sanjeev Shrivastava	Shaheen Iqbal	solo
2014	Tamanchey	"Pyar Mein Dil Pe Maar De Goli"	R D Burman, Krsna	Puneet Sharma	Bappi Lahiri and Kishore Kumar
2014	Tamanchey	"Pyar Mein Dil Pe Maar De Goli" (Munna & Babu Love Remix)	DJ Khushi	Puneet Sharma	Bappi Lahiri, Kishore Kumar and Luv O Trigger
2014	Tamanchey	"Pyar Mein Dil Pe Maar De Goli" (Disco Mix)	DJ Shilpi Sharma	Puneet Sharma	Bappi Lahiri, Kishore Kumar and Luv O Trigger
2015	Black Home	"Tu Adi hai"	Akshay Hariharan	Sahil Sultanpuri	Solo
2016	30 Minutes	"Tere Ishq Mein"	Jaspal Moni	Sanjay Dhupa Mishra	Kunal Ganjawala
2017	Begum Jaan	"Prem Mein Tohre"	Anu Malik	Kausar Munir	solo
2019	Mere Pyare Prime Minister	"Bajaa Bajaa, Dhol Bajaa"	Shankar–Ehsaan–Loy	Gulzar	Shankar Mahadevan, Divya Kumar, Rekha Bhardwaj, Neela Mulhekar, Shrinidhi Ghatate
2019	WhatsappLove	"Zara aur paas aane de"	Nitin Shankar	Sahil Sultanpuri	solo
2019	Saand Ki Aankh	"Aasmaa"	Vishal Mishra	Raj Shekhar	solo

== 2020s ==
2020	Bhangra Paa Le	"Ho Jaa Rangeela Re"	Yash Narvekar, Kiranee, Shubham Shirule, Rishi Rich, A. R. Rahman	Shlok Laal, Yash Narvekar, Kiranee, Mehboob	Shashwat Singh
2022	Life's Good	"Rut Bheege Tan"	Abhishek Ray	Manvendra	solo
2025	Dhurandhar	"Run Down The City - Monica"	Shashwat Sachdev, R. D. Burman	Reble, Majrooh Sultanpuri	Shashwat Sachdev, R. D. Burman

== Hindi non-film songs ==
Year	Film	Song	Music Director(s)	Lyrics	Co-singer(s)
1950	Aisi Lagan Laagi	"Aisi Lagan Laagi"	Jaidev	Meera	solo
1950	Aisi Lagan Laagi	"Phangan Ke Din Chaar"	Jaidev	Meera	solo
1954	N/A	"Mann More Gaa Jhoom Ke"	N/A	N/A	solo
1954	Umangon Ko Sakhi	"Ik Baat Kahun Mere Piya"	Naushad	Shakeel Badayuni	solo
1957	Vrindavan Ka Krishna Kanhaiya	"Sakhi Ri Sun Bole Papeeha"	Shankar–Jaikishan	N/A	Lata Mangeshkar
1959	Family Planning Songs	"Laal Tikon" (version 1)	Prem Dhawan	Prem Dhawan	Mohammed Rafi
1959	Family Planning Songs	"Laal Tikon" (version 2)	Prem Dhawan	Prem Dhawan	Mohammed Rafi
1965	Asha Bhosle	"Bhanwara Bada Nadan"	Hemant Kumar	Lekar hum deewana Dil title dhoon and song	
1965	Asha Bhosle	"Aaja Jaanejan Mere Meherban"	Ramlal	Hasrat Jaipuri	
1965	Asha Bhosle	"Dayya Re Dayya"	Naushad	Shakeel Badayuni	
1965	Asha Bhosle	"Tora Man Bada Papi"	Naushad	Shakeel Badayuni	
1965	Asha Bhosle	"Dil Ki Kahani Rang Lai Hai"	Ravi	Shakeel Badayuni	
1965	Asha Bhosle	"Mohe Tircchi Nazaria"	Ravi	Shakeel Badayuni	
1965	Asha Bhosle	"Mujhe Gale Se Laga Lo"	Ravi	Sahir Ludhianvi	
1965	Asha Bhosle	"Iss Tarah Toda Mera Dil"	Ravi	Rajendra Krishan	
1965	Asha Bhosle	"Nadi Nare Na Jao Shyam"	Jaidev	–	
1965	Asha Bhosle	"Ankhon Se Jo Utri Hai"	O. P. Nayyar	Majrooh Sultanpuri	
1965	Asha Bhosle	"Balma Khuli Hawa Men"	O. P. Nayyar	S. H. Bihari	
1965	Asha Bhosle	"Shokh Nazar Ki Bijliyan"	Madan Mohan	Raja Mehdi Ali Khan	
1971	An Unforgettable Treat	"Kabhi Neki Bhi Uske Ji Mein"	Jaidev	N/A	solo
1971	An Unforgettable Treat	"Kabhi Shak-O-Sabza-O-Barg Par"	Jaidev	N/A	solo
1971	An Unforgettable Treat	"Shauq Har Rang Rakibe"	Jaidev	N/A	solo
1971	An Unforgettable Treat	"Carvan Guzra Kiya"	Jaidev	N/A	solo
1971	An Unforgettable Treat	"Aali Re Mere Naina Baan Par"	Jaidev	N/A	solo
1971	An Unforgettable Treat	"Kaise Un Ko Paoon Aali"	Jaidev	N/A	solo
1971	An Unforgettable Treat	"Na MainLadi Thi"	Jaidev	N/A	solo
1971	An Unforgettable Treat	"Kolahal Kalahmen"	Jaidev	N/A	solo
1978	The Vibrantly Versatile	"Karle Pyar Karle"	N/A	N/A	solo
1978	The Vibrantly Versatile	"Phul Ud Chala"	N/A	N/A	solo
1978	The Vibrantly Versatile	"Hai Tauba Mujhe Tune"	N/A	N/A	solo
1978	The Vibrantly Versatile	"I Love You, You Love Me"	N/A	N/A	solo
1978	The Vibrantly Versatile	"Kali Kali Raat"	N/A	N/A	solo
1978	The Vibrantly Versatile	"Husn Ke Lakhon Rang"	N/A	N/A	solo
1978	The Vibrantly Versatile	"Do Pal Ki Hai Yeh Zindagani"	N/A	N/A	solo
1978	The Vibrantly Versatile	"Mere Noor Ke Charche"	N/A	N/A	solo
1978	The Vibrantly Versatile	"Mohabbat Sub Ke Dil Men Hai"	N/A	N/A	solo
1978	The Vibrantly Versatile	"Raja Dil Magey Chavanny Uchhal Ke"	N/A	N/A	solo
1978	The Vibrantly Versatile	"Aapka Sarkar Kya Kuchh"	N/A	N/A	solo
1978	The Vibrantly Versatile	"Jaga Jage Naino Mein"	N/A	N/A	solo
1985	Aabshar-e-Ghazal	"Yehi Wafa Ka Sila Hai Toh"	R D Burman	Gulzar	solo
1985	Aabshar-e-Ghazal	"Log Kehte Hain Ajanabi Tum Ho"	R D Burman	Gulzar	solo
1985	Aabshar-e-Ghazal	"Kahin Taare Kahin Shabanam"	R D Burman	Gulzar	solo
1985	Aabshar-e-Ghazal	"Yu Na Thi Mujhse Berukhi Pehle"	R D Burman	Gulzar	solo
1985	Aabshar-e-Ghazal	"Jab Raat Ki Tanhaai"	R D Burman	Gulzar	solo
1985	Aabshar-e-Ghazal	"Salona Sa Sajan Hai Aur Main Hoon"	R D Burman	Gulzar	solo
1985	Aabshar-e-Ghazal	"Dard Dil Mein Utha Sochte Sochte"	R D Burman	Gulzar	solo
1985	Aabshar-e-Ghazal	"Kuch Dur Hamaare Saath Chalo"	R D Burman	Gulzar	Hariharan
1985	Aabshar-e-Ghazal	"Pehle Bhi Jite The Magar"	R D Burman	Gulzar	Hariharan
1985	Maa Ki Mahima	"Chalo Bhakto Chalo"	Surinder Kohli	Kartarchand Nirbal	solo
1985	Maa Ki Mahima	"Paar Karo Maa Bera"	Surinder Kohli	Kartarchand Nirbal	solo
1985	Maa Ki Mahima	"Tu Hi Durga Tu Hi Bhawani"	Surinder Kohli	Akhtar Indori	solo
1985	Maa Ki Mahima	"Main Tere Hi Gun Gaun	Surinder Kohli	Akhtar Indori	solo
1985	Maa Ki Mahima	"Jai Mata Ki"	Surinder Kohli	Akhtar Indori	solo
1985	Maa Ki Mahima	"Maa Ki Mahima"	Surinder Kohli	Akhtar Indori	solo
1985	Maa Ki Mahima	"Maaye Ni Kunda Khol De"	Surinder Kohli	Balbir Nirdesh	solo
1985	Maa Ki Mahima	"Gal Sun Sheran Waliye"	Surinder Kohli	Balbir Nirdesh	solo
1987	Dil Padosi Hai	"Bheeni Bheeni Bhor"	R D Burman	Gulzar	solo
1987	Dil Padosi Hai	"Koi Diya Jale Kahin"	R D Burman	Gulzar	solo
1987	Dil Padosi Hai	"Manjhi Re Manjhi"	R D Burman	Gulzar	solo
1987	Dil Padosi Hai	"Juthe Tere Nain"	R D Burman	Gulzar	solo
1987	Dil Padosi Hai	"Jaane Do Mujhe"	R D Burman	Gulzar	solo
1987	Dil Padosi Hai	"Saawan Sasura Sataye"	R D Burman	Gulzar	solo
1987	Dil Padosi Hai	"Aye Zindagi"	R D Burman	Gulzar	solo
1987	Dil Padosi Hai	"Umeed Hogi Koi"	R D Burman	Gulzar	solo
1987	Dil Padosi Hai	"Sham Se Aankh Mein Nami Si Hai"	R D Burman	Gulzar	solo
1987	Dil Padosi Hai	"Haan Mere Gham"	R D Burman	Gulzar	solo
1987	Dil Padosi Hai	"Rishte Bante Hain"	R D Burman	Gulzar	solo
1987	Dil Padosi Hai	"Raat Chup Chaap"	R D Burman	Gulzar	solo
1987	Dil Padosi Hai	"Saaton Baar Bole Bansi"	R D Burman	Gulzar	solo
1987	Dil Padosi Hai	"Raat Christmas Ki Thi"	R D Burman	Gulzar	solo
1993	Bala Main Bairagan Hungi	"Phagun Ke Din Chaar Holi Khel Mana Re"	N/A	N/A	Usha Mangeshkar, Meena Khadikar
1993	Bala Main Bairagan Hungi	"Sakhi Meri Neend Nasani Ho"	N/A		Usha Mangeshkar, Meena Khadikar
1993	Bala Main Bairagan Hungi	"Jo Tum Sunahu Jasoda"	N/A		Usha Mangeshkar, Meena Khadikar
1993	Bala Main Bairagan Hungi	"Jasoda Hari Palane Jhulavay"	N/A		Usha Mangeshkar, Meena Khadikar
1993	Bala Main Bairagan Hungi	"Mane Chakar Rakho Ji"	N/A		Usha Mangeshkar, Meena Khadikar
1993	Bala Main Bairagan Hungi	"Tum Suna Dayal Mhari Aaji"	N/A		Usha Mangeshkar, Meena Khadikar
1993	Bala Main Bairagan Hungi	"Re Sanwalia Mharay"	N/A		Usha Mangeshkar, Meena Khadikar
1993	Bala Main Bairagan Hungi	"Bala Main Bairagan Hungi"	N/A		Usha Mangeshkar, Meena Khadikar
1993	Bala Main Bairagan Hungi	"Aali Re Mere Naina Baan Par"	N/A		Usha Mangeshkar, Meena Khadikar
1993	Bala Main Bairagan Hungi	"Kaise Unko Paoon Aali"	N/A		Usha Mangeshkar, Meena Khadikar
1993	Bala Main Bairagan Hungi	"Na Main Ladi Thi"	N/A		Usha Mangeshkar, Meena Khadikar
1993	Bala Main Bairagan Hungi	"Tumul Kolahal Kalah Mein"	N/A		Usha Mangeshkar, Meena Khadikar
1993	Bala Main Bairagan Hungi (UK Version)	"Phagun Ke Din Chaar Holi Khel Mana Re"	N/A	N/A	Usha Mangeshkar, Meena Khadikar
1993	Bala Main Bairagan Hungi (UK Version)	"Sakhi Meri Neend Nasani Ho"	N/A		Usha Mangeshkar, Meena Khadikar
1993	Bala Main Bairagan Hungi (UK Version)	"Jo Tum Sunahu Jasoda"	N/A		Usha Mangeshkar, Meena Khadikar
1993	Bala Main Bairagan Hungi (UK Version)	"Jasoda Hari Palane Jhulavay"	N/A		Usha Mangeshkar, Meena Khadikar
1993	Bala Main Bairagan Hungi (UK Version)	"Mane Chakar Rakho Ji"	N/A		Usha Mangeshkar, Meena Khadikar
1993	Bala Main Bairagan Hungi (UK Version)	"Tum Suna Dayal Mhari Aaji"	N/A		Usha Mangeshkar, Meena Khadikar
1993	Bala Main Bairagan Hungi (UK Version)	"Re Sanwalia Mharay"	N/A		Usha Mangeshkar, Meena Khadikar
1993	Bala Main Bairagan Hungi (UK Version)	"Bala Main Bairagan Hungi"	N/A		Usha Mangeshkar, Meena Khadikar
1993	Bala Main Bairagan Hungi (UK Version)	"Aali Re Mere Naina Baan Par"	N/A		Usha Mangeshkar, Meena Khadikar
1993	Bala Main Bairagan Hungi (UK Version)	"Kaise Unko Paoon Aali"	N/A		Usha Mangeshkar, Meena Khadikar
1993	Bala Main Bairagan Hungi (UK Version)	"Na Main Ladi Thi"	N/A		Usha Mangeshkar, Meena Khadikar
1993	Bala Main Bairagan Hungi (UK Version)	"Tumul Kolahal Kalah Mein"	N/A		Usha Mangeshkar, Meena Khadikar
1994	Ishq Di Mala	"Balle Balle"	N/A	N/A	Jagjit Singh, Bhupinder Singh, Suresh Wadkar
1994	Ishq Di Mala	"Thooha Larh Gaya"		N/A	Jagjit Singh, Bhupinder Singh, Suresh Wadkar
1994	Ishq Di Mala	"Pippal Pattiyan"		N/A	Jagjit Singh, Bhupinder Singh, Suresh Wadkar
1994	Ishq Di Mala	"Dil Mangiya"		N/A	Jagjit Singh, Bhupinder Singh, Suresh Wadkar
1994	Ishq Di Mala	"Ishq Dee Mala"		N/A	Jagjit Singh, Bhupinder Singh, Suresh Wadkar
1994	Ishq Di Mala	"Sari Raat"		N/A	Jagjit Singh, Bhupinder Singh, Suresh Wadkar
1994	Ishq Di Mala	"Jindua"		N/A	Jagjit Singh, Bhupinder Singh, Suresh Wadkar
1994	Ishq Di Mala (UK Version)	"Balle Balle"	N/A	N/A	Jagjit Singh, Bhupinder Singh, Suresh Wadkar
1994	Ishq Di Mala (UK Version)	"Thooha Larh Gaya"		N/A	Jagjit Singh, Bhupinder Singh, Suresh Wadkar
1994	Ishq Di Mala (UK Version)	"Pippal Pattiyan"		N/A	Jagjit Singh, Bhupinder Singh, Suresh Wadkar
1994	Ishq Di Mala (UK Version)	"Dil Mangiya"		N/A	Jagjit Singh, Bhupinder Singh, Suresh Wadkar
1994	Ishq Di Mala (UK Version)	"Ishq Dee Mala"		N/A	Jagjit Singh, Bhupinder Singh, Suresh Wadkar
1994	Ishq Di Mala (UK Version)	"Sari Raat"		N/A	Jagjit Singh, Bhupinder Singh, Suresh Wadkar
1994	Ishq Di Mala (UK Version)	"Jindua"		N/A	Jagjit Singh, Bhupinder Singh, Suresh Wadkar
1996	Asha Bhosle Sings for O. P. Nayyar	"Aaiye Meherbaan"	O. P. Nayyar	Various	solo
1996	Asha Bhosle Sings for O. P. Nayyar	"Raat Rengeeli Chamke Tare"	O. P. Nayyar	Various	solo
1996	Asha Bhosle Sings for O. P. Nayyar	"Poochho Na Hamen"	O. P. Nayyar	Various	solo
1996	Asha Bhosle Sings for O. P. Nayyar	"Chhun Chhun Ghungroo Bole"	O. P. Nayyar	Various	solo
1996	Asha Bhosle Sings for O. P. Nayyar	"Balma Khuli Hawa Mein"	O. P. Nayyar	Various	solo
1996	Asha Bhosle Sings for O. P. Nayyar	"Yeh Hai Reshmi Zulfonka Andhera"	O. P. Nayyar	Various	solo
1996	Asha Bhosle Sings for O. P. Nayyar	"Aankhon Se Jo Utri Hai Dil Mein"	O. P. Nayyar	Various	solo
1996	Asha Bhosle Sings for O. P. Nayyar	"Yehi Woh Jagah Hai"	O. P. Nayyar	Various	solo
1996	Asha Bhosle Sings for O. P. Nayyar	"Zara Haule Haule Chalo Mere Sajna"	O. P. Nayyar	Various	solo
1996	Asha Bhosle Sings for O. P. Nayyar	"Yaar Badshah Yaar Dilruba"	O. P. Nayyar	Various	solo
1996	Asha Bhosle Sings for O. P. Nayyar	"Raaton Ko Chori Chori"	O. P. Nayyar	Various	solo
1996	Asha Bhosle Sings for O. P. Nayyar	"Woh Hanske Mile Hum Se"	O. P. Nayyar	Various	solo
1996	Asha Bhosle Sings for O. P. Nayyar	"Aao Huzoor Tumko"	O. P. Nayyar	Various	solo
1996	Asha Bhosle Sings for O. P. Nayyar	"Woh Haseen Dard De Do"	O. P. Nayyar	Various	solo
1996	Asha Bhosle Sings for O. P. Nayyar	"Chain Se Ham Ko Kabhi"	O. P. Nayyar	Various	solo
1996	Shiv Parvati	"Ayi Milan Ki Bela"	Sharang Dev		Kumar Sanu
1997	Asha – Once More	"Parde Mein Rehne Do"	Various	Various	solo
1997	Asha – Once More	"Aage Bhi Jaane Na Tu"	Various	Various	solo
1997	Asha – Once More	"Ek Pardesi Mera Dil"	Various	Various	solo
1997	Asha – Once More	"Yeh Mera Dil Pyar Ka Diwana"	Various	Various	solo
1997	Asha – Once More	"Jhumka Gira Re"	Various	Various	solo
1997	Asha – Once More	"Ude Jab Jab Zulfen Teri"	Various	Various	solo
1997	Asha – Once More	"Yeh Mera Dil Pyar Ka Diwana" (Hip Hop)	Various	Various	solo
1997	Asha – Once More	"Jaane Jaan O Meri Jaane Jaan"	Various	Various	solo
1997	Jaanam Samjha Karo (Indian Version 1)	"Raat Shabnami"	Leslie Lewis	Majrooh Sultanpuri	solo
1997	Jaanam Samjha Karo (Indian Version 1)	"Maine Dekhi Ek Pari"	Leslie Lewis	Majrooh Sultanpuri	solo
1997	Jaanam Samjha Karo (Indian Version 1)	"Ailo Tum To Dillagi Mein"	Leslie Lewis	Majrooh Sultanpuri	solo
1997	Jaanam Samjha Karo (Indian Version 1)	"Woh Na Bhule Jahan"	Leslie Lewis	Majrooh Sultanpuri	solo
1997	Jaanam Samjha Karo (Indian Version 1)	"Oye Hoye Oye Hoye"	Leslie Lewis	Majrooh Sultanpuri	solo
1997	Jaanam Samjha Karo (Indian Version 1)	"Dil Pe Naaz Tha"	Leslie Lewis	Majrooh Sultanpuri	solo
1997	Jaanam Samjha Karo (Indian Version 1)	"Bas Ek Bar Kahin Ek Bar"	Leslie Lewis	Majrooh Sultanpuri	solo
1997	Jaanam Samjha Karo (Indian Version 1)	"Saari Raat Kyon"	Leslie Lewis	Majrooh Sultanpuri	solo
1997	Jaanam Samjha Karo (Indian Version 2)	"Raat Shabnami"	Leslie Lewis	Majrooh Sultanpuri	solo
1997	Jaanam Samjha Karo (Indian Version 2)	"Maine Dekhi Ek Pari"	Leslie Lewis	Majrooh Sultanpuri	solo
1997	Jaanam Samjha Karo (Indian Version 2)	"Ailo Tum To Dillagi Mein"	Leslie Lewis	Majrooh Sultanpuri	solo
1997	Jaanam Samjha Karo (Indian Version 2)	"Woh Na Bhule Jahan"	Leslie Lewis	Majrooh Sultanpuri	solo
1997	Jaanam Samjha Karo (Indian Version 2)	"Oye Hoye Oye Hoye"	Leslie Lewis	Majrooh Sultanpuri	solo
1997	Jaanam Samjha Karo (Indian Version 2)	"Dil Pe Naaz Tha"	Leslie Lewis	Majrooh Sultanpuri	solo
1997	Jaanam Samjha Karo (Indian Version 2)	"Bas Ek Bar Kahin Ek Bar"	Leslie Lewis	Majrooh Sultanpuri	solo
1997	Jaanam Samjha Karo (Indian Version 2)	"Saari Raat Kyon"	Leslie Lewis	Majrooh Sultanpuri	solo
1997	Jaanam Samjha Karo (Uk Version 1)	"Raat Shabnami"	Leslie Lewis	Majrooh Sultanpuri	solo
1997	Jaanam Samjha Karo (Uk Version 1)	"Maine Dekhi Ek Pari"	Leslie Lewis	Majrooh Sultanpuri	solo
1997	Jaanam Samjha Karo (Uk Version 1)	"Ailo Tum To Dillagi Mein"	Leslie Lewis	Majrooh Sultanpuri	solo
1997	Jaanam Samjha Karo (Uk Version 1)	"Woh Na Bhule Jahan"	Leslie Lewis	Majrooh Sultanpuri	solo
1997	Jaanam Samjha Karo (Uk Version 1)	"Oye Hoye Oye Hoye"	Leslie Lewis	Majrooh Sultanpuri	solo
1997	Jaanam Samjha Karo (Uk Version 1)	"Dil Pe Naaz Tha"	Leslie Lewis	Majrooh Sultanpuri	solo
1997	Jaanam Samjha Karo (Uk Version 1)	"Bas Ek Bar Kahin Ek Bar"	Leslie Lewis	Majrooh Sultanpuri	solo
1997	Jaanam Samjha Karo (Uk Version 1)	"Saari Raat Kyon"	Leslie Lewis	Majrooh Sultanpuri	solo
1997	Jaanam Samjha Karo (Uk Version 2)	"Raat Shabnami"	Leslie Lewis	Majrooh Sultanpuri	solo
1997	Jaanam Samjha Karo (Uk Version 2)	"Maine Dekhi Ek Pari"	Leslie Lewis	Majrooh Sultanpuri	solo
1997	Jaanam Samjha Karo (Uk Version 2)	"Ailo Tum To Dillagi Mein"	Leslie Lewis	Majrooh Sultanpuri	solo
1997	Jaanam Samjha Karo (Uk Version 2)	"Woh Na Bhule Jahan"	Leslie Lewis	Majrooh Sultanpuri	solo
1997	Jaanam Samjha Karo (Uk Version 2)	"Oye Hoye Oye Hoye"	Leslie Lewis	Majrooh Sultanpuri	solo
1997	Jaanam Samjha Karo (Uk Version 2)	"Dil Pe Naaz Tha"	Leslie Lewis	Majrooh Sultanpuri	solo
1997	Jaanam Samjha Karo (Uk Version 2)	"Bas Ek Bar Kahin Ek Bar"	Leslie Lewis	Majrooh Sultanpuri	solo
1997	Jaanam Samjha Karo (Uk Version 2)	"Saari Raat Kyon"	Leslie Lewis	Majrooh Sultanpuri	solo
1998	Mausam Pyar Ka	"Barse Badal"	Adnan Sami	Gulzar, Riyaz–Ul–Rehman	solo
1998	Mausam Pyar Ka	"Pyar Hai"	Adnan Sami	Gulzar, Riyaz–Ul–Rehman	solo
1998	Mausam Pyar Ka	"Bheega Mausam"	Adnan Sami	Gulzar, Riyaz–Ul–Rehman	solo
1998	Mausam Pyar Ka	"Aap Ki Surat"	Adnan Sami	Gulzar, Riyaz–Ul–Rehman	solo
1998	Mausam Pyar Ka	"Yaad Aaya"	Adnan Sami	Gulzar, Riyaz–Ul–Rehman	solo
1998	Mausam Pyar Ka	"Suhani Rut"	Adnan Sami	Gulzar, Riyaz–Ul–Rehman	solo
1998	Mausam Pyar Ka	"Aye Khuda"	Adnan Sami	Gulzar, Riyaz–Ul–Rehman	solo
1998	Mausam Pyar Ka	"Pyar Bina"	Adnan Sami	Gulzar, Riyaz–Ul–Rehman	solo
1998	The Golden collection (Asha Bhosle and Mohammed Rafi Duets)	"Abhi Na Jao Chhod Kar"	Jaidev	Sahir Ludhianvi	Mohammed Rafi
1998	The Golden collection (Asha Bhosle and Mohammed Rafi Duets)	"Aaja Panchhi Akela Hai"	S. D. Burman	Majrooh Sultanpuri	Mohammed Rafi
1998	The Golden collection (Asha Bhosle and Mohammed Rafi Duets)	"Achhaji Main Hari Chalo"	S. D. Burman	Majrooh Sultanpuri	Mohammed Rafi
1998	The Golden collection (Asha Bhosle and Mohammed Rafi Duets)	"Deewana Mastana Hua Badal"	S. D. Burman	Majrooh Sultanpuri	Mohammed Rafi
1998	The Golden collection (Asha Bhosle and Mohammed Rafi Duets)	"Uden Jab Jab Zulfen Teri"	O. P. Nayyar	Sahir Ludhianvi	Mohammed Rafi
1998	The Golden collection (Asha Bhosle and Mohammed Rafi Duets)	"Aaye Hain Door Se"	O. P. Nayyar	Majrooh Sultanpuri	Mohammed Rafi
1998	The Golden collection (Asha Bhosle and Mohammed Rafi Duets)	"Zameen Se Humen Aasman"	Madan Mohan	Rajendra Krishan	Mohammed Rafi
1998	The Golden collection (Asha Bhosle and Mohammed Rafi Duets)	"Kabhi Tera Daman"	Madan Mohan	Rajendra Krishan	Mohammed Rafi
1998	The Golden collection (Asha Bhosle and Mohammed Rafi Duets)	"Dekh Humen Aawaz Na Dena"	C. Ramchandra	Rajendra Krishan	Mohammed Rafi
1998	The Golden collection (Asha Bhosle and Mohammed Rafi Duets)	"Yeh Raat Yeh Fizayen"	S. Madan	Majrooh Sultanpuri	Mohammed Rafi
1998	The Golden collection (Asha Bhosle and Mohammed Rafi Duets)	"Chand Sa Mukhda"	S. D. Burman	Shailendra	Mohammed Rafi
1998	The Golden collection (Asha Bhosle and Mohammed Rafi Duets)	"Ek Pardesi Mera Dil Le Gaya"	O. P. Nayyar	Qamar Jalalabadi	Mohammed Rafi
1998	The Golden collection (Asha Bhosle and Mohammed Rafi Duets)	"Bahut Shukriya Badi Meharbani"	S. H. Bihari		Mohammed Rafi
1998	The Golden collection (Asha Bhosle and Mohammed Rafi Duets)	'Dhalti Jaye Raat	Lachhiram Tomar	Anand Bakshi	Mohammed Rafi
1998	The Golden collection (Asha Bhosle and Mohammed Rafi Duets)	"Jabse Tumhen Dekha Hai"	Ravi	Shakeel Badayuni	Mohammed Rafi
1998	The Golden collection (Asha Bhosle and Mohammed Rafi Duets)	"In Baharon Mein"	Roshan	Majrooh Sultanpuri	Mohammed Rafi
1998	The Golden collection (Asha Bhosle and Mohammed Rafi Duets)	"Aaja Aaja Main Hoon Pyaar Tera"	R. D. Burman	Majrooh Sultanpuri	Mohammed Rafi
1998	The Golden collection (Asha Bhosle and Mohammed Rafi Duets)	"Isharon Isharon Mein"	O. P. Nayyar	S. H. Bihari	Mohammed Rafi
1998	The Golden collection (Asha Bhosle and Mohammed Rafi Duets)	"Aap Se Maine"	O. P. Nayyar	S. H. Bihari	Mohammed Rafi
1998	The Golden collection (Asha Bhosle and Mohammed Rafi Duets)	"Yeh Ab Aap Sochiye"	O. P. Nayyar	Majrooh Sultanpuri	Mohammed Rafi
1998	The Golden collection (Asha Bhosle and Mohammed Rafi Duets)	"Chha Gaye Badal"	Roshan	Sahir Ludhianvi	Mohammed Rafi
1998	The Golden collection (Asha Bhosle and Mohammed Rafi Duets)	"Aap Ko Pyar Chhupane Ki"	Madan Mohan	Raja Mehdi Ali Khan	Mohammed Rafi
1998	The Golden collection (Asha Bhosle and Mohammed Rafi Duets)	"Dilruba Dil Pe Tu"	Shankar–Jaikishan	Shailendra	Mohammed Rafi
1998	The Golden collection (Asha Bhosle and Mohammed Rafi Duets)	"Panchhi Re O Panchhi"	Shankar–Jaikishan	Shailendra	Mohammed Rafi
1998	The Golden collection (Asha Bhosle and Mohammed Rafi Duets)	"Raat Ke Humsafar"	Shankar–Jaikishan	Shailendra	Mohammed Rafi
1998	The Golden collection (Asha Bhosle and Mohammed Rafi Duets)	"Sawan Aaye Ya Na Aaye"	Naushad	Shakeel Badayuni	Mohammed Rafi
1998	The Golden collection (Asha Bhosle and Mohammed Rafi Duets)	"Dil To Pahle Se Madhosh Hai"	O. P. Nayyar	Shewan Rizvi	Mohammed Rafi
1998	The Golden collection (Asha Bhosle and Mohammed Rafi Duets)	"Dhal Gaya Din"	Laxmikant–Pyarelal	Anand Bakshi	Mohammed Rafi
1998	The Golden collection (Asha Bhosle and Mohammed Rafi Duets)	"Gunguna Rahe Hain Bhanvre"	S. D. Burman	Anand Bakshi	Mohammed Rafi
1998	The Golden collection (Asha Bhosle and Mohammed Rafi Duets)	"Jis Din Se Maine Tumko Dekha Hai"	Madan Mohan	Majrooh Sultanpuri	Mohammed Rafi
1998	The Golden collection (Asha Bhosle and Mohammed Rafi Duets)	"Chura Liya Hai Tumbe Jo Dil Ko"	R. D. Burman	Majrooh Sultanpuri	Mohammed Rafi
2001	Aap Ki Asha	"Na Marte Hum"	N/A	N/A	solo
2001	Aap Ki Asha	"Has Ke Mila Na Karo"	N/A	N/A	solo
2001	Aap Ki Asha	"Aisa Bhi Kya" (Fast)	N/A	N/A	solo
2001	Aap Ki Asha	"Dil Pyar Mein Lutake"	N/A	N/A	solo
2001	Aap Ki Asha	"Uljhi Laton Ki Tarah"	N/A	N/A	solo
2001	Aap Ki Asha	"Salamat Salamat"	N/A	N/A	solo
2001	Aap Ki Asha	"Dekhna Ha-Aa"	N/A	N/A	solo
2001	Aap Ki Asha	"Dil Mere Gaye Ja"	N/A	N/A	solo
2001	Aap Ki Asha	"Aisa Bhi Kya" (Hip Hop)	N/A	N/A	solo
2001	Aap Ki Asha	Tribute To Majrooh Sahab"	N/A	N/A	solo
2001	Eternal Asha:Aaj...Kal...Hamesha	"Welcome By Asha"	various	various	solo
2001	Eternal Asha:Aaj...Kal...Hamesha	"Aaiye Meherbaan"	various	various	solo
2001	Eternal Asha:Aaj...Kal...Hamesha	"Yeh Hai Reshmi Zulfonka"	various	various	solo
2001	Eternal Asha:Aaj...Kal...Hamesha	"Asha As Helen"	various	various	solo
2001	Eternal Asha:Aaj...Kal...Hamesha	"Aao Na, Gale Lagao Na"	various	various	solo
2001	Eternal Asha:Aaj...Kal...Hamesha	"The Monica Legend"	various	various	solo
2001	Eternal Asha:Aaj...Kal...Hamesha	"Piya Tu Ab To Aaja"	various	various	solo
2001	Eternal Asha:Aaj...Kal...Hamesha	"Aaja Aaja"	various	various	solo
2001	Eternal Asha:Aaj...Kal...Hamesha	"Asha On Madan Mohan"	various	various	solo
2001	Eternal Asha:Aaj...Kal...Hamesha	"Jhumka Geera Re"	various	various	solo
2001	Eternal Asha:Aaj...Kal...Hamesha	"Asha : The Making Of Chura Liya"	various	various	solo
2001	Eternal Asha:Aaj...Kal...Hamesha	"Chura Liya"	various	various	solo
2001	Eternal Asha:Aaj...Kal...Hamesha	"Yeh Mera Dil"	various	various	solo
2001	Eternal Asha:Aaj...Kal...Hamesha	"Dum Maaro Dum"	various	various	solo
2001	Eternal Asha:Aaj...Kal...Hamesha	"Dil Cheez Kya Hai"	various	various	solo
2001	Eternal Asha:Aaj...Kal...Hamesha	"Yeh Ladka Hai Allah"	various	various	solo
2001	Eternal Asha:Aaj...Kal...Hamesha	"Jaanam Samjha Karo"	various	various	solo
2001	Eternal Asha:Aaj...Kal...Hamesha	"Asha Introduces Lucky Ali"	various	various	solo
2001	Eternal Asha:Aaj...Kal...Hamesha	"Asha : The A.R. Rahman Experience"	various	various	solo
2001	Eternal Asha:Aaj...Kal...Hamesha	"Rangeela Re"	various	various	solo
2001	Eternal Asha:Aaj...Kal...Hamesha	"Asha On The Shobbana Samarth Family"	various	various	solo
2001	Eternal Asha:Aaj...Kal...Hamesha	"Zara Sa Jhoom Loon Main"	various	various	solo
2001	Eternal Asha:Aaj...Kal...Hamesha	"Range De"	various	various	solo
2001	Eternal Asha:Aaj...Kal...Hamesha	"Le Gayee Le Gayee"	various	various	solo
2001	Eternal Asha:Aaj...Kal...Hamesha	"Jaane Ja"	various	various	Babul Supriyo
2001	Shiv Stuti	"Utaro Aarti Bholenath Ki"	Gulshan Kumar	N/A	solo
2001	Shiv Stuti	"Le Ke Man Mein Aitbaar"	Gulshan Kumar	N/A	solo
2001	Shiv Stuti	"Shiv Shiv Shiv"	Gulshan Kumar	N/A	solo
2003	Asha Top 10	"Dum Maro Dum (song)"	R D Burman	Majrooh Sultanpuri	solo
2003	Asha Top 10	"Piya Tu Ab To Aaja"	R D Burman	Majrooh Sultanpuri	R D Burman
2003	Asha Top 10	"Chura Liya Hai Tumne Jo Dil Ko"	R D Burman	Majrooh Sultanpuri	Mohammed Rafi
2003	Asha Top 10	"Yeh Ladka Hai Allah"			Mohammed Rafi
2003	Asha Top 10	"Rangeela Re"	A. R. Rahman	Mehboob	solo
2003	Asha Top 10	"Radha Kaise Na Jale"	A. R. Rahman	Javed Akhtar	Udit Narayan, A. R. Rahman, Vaishali Samant
2003	Asha Top 10	"Rang De"	A. R. Rahman	Sukhwinder Singh	A. R. Rahman
2003	Asha Top 10	"Le Gayee Le Gayee"	Uttam Singh	Anand Bakshi	solo
2003	Asha Top 10	"Zara Sa Jhoom Loon Main"	Jatin–Lalit	Anand Bakshi	Abhijeet Bhattacharya
2003	Asha Top 10	"Ye Mera Dil"	Kalyanji–Anandji	Indeevar	
2003	Bala Main Bairagan Hungi	"Phagun Ke Din Chaar Holi Khel Mana Re"	N/A	N/A	solo
2003	Bala Main Bairagan Hungi	"Sakhi Meri Neend Nasani Ho"	N/A		solo
2003	Bala Main Bairagan Hungi	"Jo Tum Sunahu Jasoda"	N/A		solo
2003	Bala Main Bairagan Hungi	"Jasoda Hari Palane Jhulavay"	N/A		solo
2003	Bala Main Bairagan Hungi	"Mane Chakar Rakho Ji"	N/A		solo
2003	Bala Main Bairagan Hungi	"Tum Suna Dayal Mhari Aaji"	N/A		solo
2003	Bala Main Bairagan Hungi	"Re Sanwalia Mharay"	N/A		solo
2003	Bala Main Bairagan Hungi	"Bala Main Bairagan Hungi"	N/A		solo
2003	Bala Main Bairagan Hungi	"Aali Re Mere Naina Baan Par"	N/A		solo
2003	Bala Main Bairagan Hungi	"Kaise Unko Paoon Aali"	N/A		solo
2003	Bala Main Bairagan Hungi	"Na Main Ladi Thi"	N/A		solo
2003	Bala Main Bairagan Hungi	"Tumul Kolahal Kalah Mein"	N/A		solo
2005	A Brand Bew Album	"Aaj Jaane Ki Zid Na Karo"	various	various	solo
2005	A Brand Bew Album	"Sarakti Jaye Hai" (Ahista Ahista)	various	various	solo
2005	A Brand Bew Album	"Aawargi"	various	various	solo
2005	A Brand Bew Album	"Dil Mein Ek Lehar"	various	various	solo
2005	A Brand Bew Album	"Rafta Rafta"	various	various	solo
2005	A Brand Bew Album	"Mujhe Tum Nazar Se"	various	various	solo
2005	A Brand Bew Album	"Ranjish Hi Sahi"	various	various	solo
2005	A Brand Bew Album	"Chupke Chupke"	various	various	solo
2005	A Brand Bew Album	"Aaj Jaane Ki Zid Na Karo" (Video Edit)	various	various	solo
2006	Asha and Friends – Volume 1	"Mehbooba Dilruba"	Shamir Tandon	Vijay Akela	Urmila Matondkar
2006	Asha and Friends – Volume 1	"Aapke Dil Mein"	Shamir Tandon	Vijay Akela	Sanjay Dutt
2006	Asha and Friends – Volume 1	"Aapke Dil Mein (Dance Mix)	Shamir Tandon	Vijay Akela	Sanjay Dutt
2006	Asha and Friends – Volume 1	"Jamane Mein Aaye Diwane Naye"	Shamir Tandon	Ajay Jhingran	solo
2006	Asha and Friends – Volume 1	"Haan Mai Tumhara Hu"	Shamir Tandon	Shamir Tandon, Brett Lee	Brett Lee
2006	Asha and Friends – Volume 1	"Haan Main Tumhara Hu" (Remix)	Shamir Tandon	Shamir Tandon, Brett Lee	Brett Lee
2008	Generations: A Musical Journey To Eternity	"Naina Re Naina"	Aamir Ghulam Ali	Ahmad Anees	Ghulam Ali
2008	Generations: A Musical Journey To Eternity	"Dheere Dheere Tere Pyar Mein"	Aamir Ghulam Ali	Ahmad Anees	Ghulam Ali
2008	Generations: A Musical Journey To Eternity	"Socho Mein Gum Kyoon Hoon"	Aamir Ghulam Ali	Ahmad Anees	Ghulam Ali
2008	Generations: A Musical Journey To Eternity	"Shaam Se Mann Udhas"	Aamir Ghulam Ali	Ahmad Anees	Ghulam Ali
2008	Generations: A Musical Journey To Eternity	"Dil Se"	Aamir Ghulam Ali	Ahmad Anees	Ghulam Ali
2008	Generations: A Musical Journey To Eternity	"Tore Bina"	Aamir Ghulam Ali	Ahmad Anees	Ghulam Ali
2008	Generations: A Musical Journey To Eternity	"Ek Lamhe"	Aamir Ghulam Ali	Ahmad Anees	Ghulam Ali
2008	Generations: A Musical Journey To Eternity	"Dil Bichadne Se"	Aamir Ghulam Ali	Ahmad Anees	Ghulam Ali
2008	Generations: A Musical Journey To Eternity	"Naina Re Naina"	Aamir Ghulam Ali	Ahmad Anees	Ghulam Ali
2008	Generations: A Musical Journey To Eternity	"Socho Mein Gum Kyoon Hoon" (Remix)	Aamir Ghulam Ali	Ahmad Anees	Ghulam Ali
2008	Generations: A Musical Journey To Eternity	"Naina Re Naina" (Remix)	Aamir Ghulam Ali	Ahmad Anees	Ghulam Ali
2008	Generations: A Musical Journey To Eternity	"Dheere Dheere Tere Pyar Mein" (Remix)	Aamir Ghulam Ali	Ahmad Anees	Ghulam Ali
2010	Psych Funk Sa-Re-Ga!	"Lekar Ham Diwana Dil"	R. D. Burman	various	Kishore Kumar
2010	Psych Funk Sa-Re-Ga!	"Aaj Mera Dil"	R. D. Burman	various	solo
2010	Psych Funk Sa-Re-Ga!	"Dum Maro Dum Live" (Edit)	R. D. Burman	various	solo
2010	Psych Funk Sa-Re-Ga!	"Phir Teri Yaad"	Hemant Bhosle	various	solo
2020	Single	"Main Hoon"	Rohit Shridhar	Rajita Kulkarni	solo
N/A	Single	"Maina O Maina"	Salil Chowdhury	N/A	solo
N/A	Single	"Neeyat-E-Shauq"	Mohsin Raza	Nasir Kazmi	solo

=== Hindi TV serial songs ===
Year	Film	Song	Music Director(s)	Lyrics	Co-singer(s)
1993	Alif Laila (Hindi)	"Tera Hi Intezaar Tha"	Ravindra Jain		solo

== Bibliography ==
- Premchand, Manek (27 December 2018). Yesterday's Melodies Today's Memories. Notion Press. ISBN 978-1-64429-877-0.
