= List of villages in Mainpuri district =

Distribution of village population sizes in Mainpuri district, as of 2011. 31 abandoned villages are not included in the dataset.
1. Less than 200 people: 22 villages (2.7%)
2. Between 200 and 499 people: 92 villages (11.2%)
3. Between 500 and 999 people: 200 villages (24.4%)
4. Between 1,000 and 1,999 people: 246 villages (30%)
5. Between 2,000 and 4,999 people: 202 villages (24.6%)
6. Between 5,000 and 9,999 people: 53 villages (6.5%)
7. 10,000 or more: 5 villages (0.6%)

There are 851 villages in Mainpuri district as of 2011, with a combined population of 1,580,087. Of these, 503 villages have gram panchayats.

== Mainpuri tehsil ==
=== Ghiror ===
The following 74 villages are counted as part of Ghiror CD block:

1. Achalpur
2. Ahmadpur
3. Akbarpur Aunchha
4. Amberpur
5. Ataharaina
6. Aurangabad
7. Badshahpur
8. Balampur
9. Bamhauri Awahar
10. Bamrauli
11. Bhatani
12. Bhugai
13. Bidhuna
14. Bighrayi
15. Bikarampur
16. Budhrra
17. Chitayi
18. Dannahar
19. Darapur
20. Darwah
21. Devpura
22. Dhaurasi
23. Esaimadhupuri
24. Faizpur
25. Fazilpur
26. Gariya Khas
27. Gathiya Sakat
28. Ghiror (rural)
29. Godhna
30. Gurahi
31. Hajipur
32. Harhai
33. Himmatpur Harayi
34. Himmatpur Ujiyari
35. Kalhaur Panchha
36. Kalhorpuwan
37. Kanegi
38. Kerawali
39. Kosma Hinood
40. Kosma Musalmeen
41. Koson
42. Kothiya
43. Kurawali
44. Lapgavan
45. Lohabal Khera
46. Madhan
47. Mahtauli
48. Muhammadpur Ghiror
49. Nagla Amarsingh
50. Nagla Devi
51. Nagla Fateh Khan
52. Nagla Indr
53. Nagla Kanchan
54. Nagla Kathengara
55. Nagla Mahanand
56. Nagla Manjha
57. Nagla Minte
58. Nagla Naya
59. Nagla Punu
60. Nagla Rama
61. Nagla Salehi
62. Nagla Sauj
63. Nahili
64. Nasirpur
65. Neelakanthpur
66. Oya
67. Pachaver
68. Padriya
69. Rampura
70. Shahjadpur
71. Shahjahanpur
72. Taharpur
73. Talibpur
74. Tisah
75. Usnida

=== Kuraoli ===
The following 103 villages are counted as part of Kuraoli CD block:

1. Akbarpur Jhala
2. Alupura
3. Araji Tarwali
4. Ashokpur
5. Ashokpur
6. Athpura
7. Balipur
8. Balrampur
9. Barauliya
10. Barkhera
11. Basura Sultanpur
12. Beekapur
13. Belahar
14. Bhanpur
15. Bharatpur
16. Bichiya Vikrampur
17. Bikrampur
18. Birasinghpur
19. Chandrapur
20. Dahipagar
21. Dangan
22. Devinagar
23. Devkali
24. Dharendra
25. Dhivaiya
26. Divrayi
27. Dulhapur
28. E. Balabhpur
29. E. Hirapur
30. E. Khas
31. E. Mahloyi
32. E. Manjhpati
33. E. Gopalpur
34. E. Sari
35. Fatehjangpur
36. Firozpur
37. Gahiyarpur
38. Ganeshpur
39. Ganga Jamuni
40. Gangapur Muhabatpur
41. Gariya
42. Ghuslenda
43. Gokulpur
44. Gulalpur
45. Hafizpur
46. Harmadhakarpur
47. Hatu Mubarakpur
48. Jakhaua
49. Jamlapur
50. Jigan Chandai
51. Jiyoli Ghingarpur
52. Junhensa
53. Jyoti (rural)
54. Kalyanpur
55. Kanchanpur
56. Kanikpur
57. Karanpur
58. Khichauli
59. Khiriyapiper
60. Khirna
61. Kichaura
62. Kishanpur
63. Kookamai
64. Kumhraua
65. Lakhaura
66. Laxmipur
67. Madhkarpur
68. Mahadeva Jagatpur
69. Makboolpur
70. Manauna
71. Mithawali Kalan
72. Mithawali Khurd
73. Mugaliyapur
74. Nagla Usar
75. Nagriya
76. Nanamau
77. Nasratpur Dehat
78. Naugaon
79. Naurangpur
80. Nijampur
81. Paharpur
82. Panwah
83. Rajapur
84. Rampura
85. Rasemar
86. Richpura
87. Rosingpur
88. Rustampur
89. Sahadattpur
90. Salempur
91. Saray Latif
92. Sharifpur
93. Sidpura
94. Sirsa
95. Soni
96. Sujanpur
97. Sujrai Dehat
98. Tarauli
99. Thorwa
100. Timanpur
101. Uddetpur Har Khatkani
102. Uddetpur Paramkuti
103. Vishunpur

=== Mainpuri ===
The following 77 villages are counted as part of Mainpuri CD block:

1. Akundaiya
2. Anjani
3. Arupur
4. Asyoli
5. Auden Mandal
6. Auden Padariya
7. Augautha
8. Baragaon
9. Badanpur
10. Baderi
11. Bahadurpur
12. Barauli
13. Bhagpur
14. Bhaupur
15. Brahmpur Suhaya
16. Burra
17. Chandpur
18. Deva Mai
19. Devpur Bharthra
20. Devpura Dehat
21. Dharau
22. Dharmrajpur
23. Dharmangadpur Nagariya
24. Divauli
25. Ekar
26. Gaderi
27. Gangsi
28. Ghitoli
29. Gupalpur
30. Halpura
31. Harchandpur
32. Hasanpur
33. Jagruppur
34. Jara Mai
35. Jasrau
36. Jat Khera
37. Jawapur
38. Jichauli
39. Kakan
40. Karimganj
41. Kharpari
42. Khatikpur
43. Khija
44. Kiratpur
45. Kuchela
46. Kudahar
47. Kuderi
48. Lahra Annipur
49. Lahra Mahuan
50. Lalpur Sadhini
51. Lodhipur
52. Madhau
53. Mainpuri Khas
54. Maroli
55. Nagla Garu
56. Narayanpur
57. Nauner
58. Nawada
59. Parokh
60. Pirpur
61. Ramaihar
62. Rathera
63. Rati Bhanpur
64. Rudrapur
65. Ruppur Bharatpur
66. Sagauni
67. Saidpur Bhagauli
68. Sansarpur
69. Santpur
70. Sathni Dalippur
71. Shivsinghpur
72. Sikandarpur
73. Siroliya
74. Tabepur
75. Tindoli
76. Udetpur Abhai
77. Ujhaiya Fakirpur

== Karhal tehsil ==
=== Barnahal ===
The following 89 villages are counted as part of Barnahal CD block:

1. Abdulnabipur
2. Agrapur
3. Ahmadpur
4. Ajampur
5. Alamgirpur
6. Alampur Deha
7. Amahasan Nagar
8. Andupur
9. Aspura
10. Aurangabad
11. Bahsi
12. Balpura
13. Bamtapur
14. Bangawan
15. Barnahal (block headquarters)
16. Bhagwatipur
17. Bhidaura
18. Bhurapur
19. Binepur
20. Birthua
21. Chandikara
22. Daloopur
23. Dariyapur
24. Dehuli
25. Dhakpura
26. Dharampur
27. Garhia Jainpur
28. Gaundai
29. Goliyapur
30. Gopiyapur
31. Gotpur
32. Hajipur Nera
33. Hajipur Samari
34. Hakimpur
35. Ikahra
36. Ismailpur
37. Jagannathpur
38. Jaitpur
39. Kalanderpur
40. Kalashpur
41. Kanikpur Khijarpur
42. Kanikpur Sada
43. Karukhera
44. Kasoli
45. Katholi
46. Kesopur
47. Kharaua
48. Khera Mahan
49. Kherendesh Nagar
50. Khushalpur
51. Kumheri
52. Lakhan Mau
53. Longpur
54. Marahamai
55. Masarpur
56. Mithepur
57. Mohanpur
58. Mugalpur
59. Muhabbatpur Labhuya
60. Nagla Bhai Khan
61. Nagla Mandhata
62. Nagla Niwhara
63. Nagla Sahab
64. Nawa Urf Teda
65. Nitawali
66. Normai
67. Pahadpur
68. Pairar Shahpur
69. Parasrampur
70. Phulapur
71. Prahladpur
72. Rahmatullaapur
73. Rasulpur
74. Rerapur
75. Saiyadpur Kahari
76. Saiyadpur Pran
77. Sajawarpur
78. Sajhajipur
79. Sarai Mugalpur
80. Saringa Nasirpur
81. Shahjadpur
82. Shahjahanpur
83. Shukrullapur
84. Sondra
85. Sothara
86. Sunupur
87. Terkara Daulatpur
88. Tulsipur
89. Urthan

=== Karhal block ===
The following 97 villages are counted as part of Karhal CD block:

1. Ahladpur
2. Aima Naglamir Mohal Awwal
3. Aimanpur
4. Allipur
5. Amamai
6. Andani
7. Anuppur
8. Asrohi
9. Attikullapur
10. Badsui
11. Begampur
12. Bajartalia
13. Bausak
14. Bhanti
15. Bhawanipur
16. Binayakpur
17. Birsinghpur
18. Buramai
19. Chakudhan
20. Chandpura
21. Dadupur
22. Dayampur
23. Deokali
24. Dhankarpur
25. Dhowai
26. Dostpur
27. Dudgaun
28. Dunwa
29. Gadanpur
30. Gamhira
31. Gauri
32. Gopalpur
33. Harer
34. Harwai
35. Jalalpur
36. Jaothri
37. Kabrai
38. Kakbai
39. Kamalpur
40. Kanakpur
41. Kanjhara
42. Karhal (rural)
43. Khajurara Ijjatpur
44. Khera
45. Khirongi
46. Kirthua
47. Konda Paharpur
48. Kurra Jarawan
49. Kursara
50. Kutukpur Buzurg
51. Kutukpur Nasirpur
52. Lahtoi Shahjahanpur
53. Madrawali
54. Makiyani
55. Mamsirpur
56. Manauna
57. Manikpur Parasrampur
58. Manikpur Sahas
59. Marhapur
60. Muhabbatpur
61. Muhammadpur Nagariya
62. Nadrela
63. Nagla Bhogpur
64. Nagla Kondar
65. Nagla Madari
66. Nagla Mateya
67. Nagla Raja
68. Nagla Tikrai
69. Nakau
70. Nasirpur
71. Ninoli
72. Onha
73. Paliya
74. Pandura
75. Pasupur
76. Patara
77. Pirthipur
78. Rajpur
79. Ranipur
80. Rarua
81. Rumpura
82. Sarh
83. Sahabrampur
84. Sahan
85. Sahas
86. Salempur
87. Sarsai Masumpur
88. Sauj
89. Shankarpur
90. Simrau
91. Singhpur
92. Takhrau
93. Taroliya
94. Timrakh
95. Udhan
96. Udnadada
97. Vijaipur

== Bhogaon tehsil ==
=== Sultanganj block ===
The following 102 villages are counted as part of Sultanganj CD block:

1. Ahemadpur
2. Ahirwa
3. Alipur Patti
4. Allikhera
5. Asafpur
6. Aurandh
7. Balarpur
8. Balarpur Ramnagar
9. Bara Surajpur
10. Beenamau
11. Bharatpur
12. Bhawani Nagar
13. Bhongaon Dehat
14. Bhojpur
15. Bichhawan
16. Billon
17. Birsinghpur
18. Brijpur
19. Bura Chak Sahara
20. Byonti Khurd
21. Chhachha
22. Chhatripur
23. Daleeppur Kailai
24. Danchaura
25. Darka
26. Daya Ram Pur
27. Devganj
28. Dhanmau
29. Diwanpur Chowdhary
30. Dudhauna
31. Fardpur
32. Fatehpur
33. Ganeshpur
34. Garhiya Govindpur
35. Goshalpur
36. Govindpur
37. Hamirpur
38. Hannukhera
39. Harchandpur Meerapur
40. Harganpur
41. Hussainpur
42. Itoree
43. Jagatpur
44. Jaili Jirauli
45. Jaitoolpur
46. Jalalpur
47. Jambhari
48. Jaramai
49. Jasanpur
50. Jasrathpur
51. Jaswantpur
52. Kamalpur
53. Katka
54. Khatana
55. Kinhawar
56. Lalupura
57. Lehra
58. Maholi Khera
59. Malpur
60. Manikpur
61. Marhari
62. Mayachandpur
63. Meerapur Sujapur
64. Missaura
65. Mohabbatpur
66. Mohanpur
67. Muradpur Nagaria
68. Murhauli
69. Nagla Bhagat
70. Nagla Mitkar
71. Nagla Semar
72. Naka
73. Narsinghpur
74. Paal
75. Padampur
76. Pussaina
77. Rajwana
78. Rakari
79. Ramnagar
80. Rudaunia
81. Rui Sinaura
82. Sahara
83. Sahjadepur
84. Saidpur
85. Sanda
86. Saraiya
87. Sarjanpur
88. Shah Alampur
89. Shahpura
90. Simarai
91. Siwai Bhadaura
92. Sulkhanpur
93. Sultanganj
94. Sunnamai
95. Surjanpur
96. Surjanpur Barkhera
97. Tarapur Chak
98. Tisaulli
99. Tolakpur
100. Udaipur Naraini
101. Usmanpur

=== Bewar block ===
The following 157 villages are counted as part of Bewar CD block:

1. Ahimalpur
2. Ahinkaripur
3. Ahmadpur Karuamai
4. Akbarpur Biku
5. Akbarpur Ganu
6. Amhira
7. Apoor Pur
8. Aram Sarai
9. Athalakra
10. Baghpur
11. Bahdinpur
12. Bahramau
13. Bajhera
14. Bajpur
15. Bakipur
16. Banakia
17. Bankahar
18. Bara
19. Barauli
20. Beerpur Khas
21. Bewar Grameem
22. Bhainsroli
23. Bhawalpur
24. Bhilampur
25. Bhur Bakain
26. Bhur Haar
27. Bhur Patia
28. Bikkapur
29. Bilpur Hussainpur
30. Bilsara
31. Binodpur
32. Biraimpur Satdhara
33. Chandanpur
34. Chandanpura
35. Chanepur
36. Chaumajhee
37. Chhabilepur
38. Chhinkaura Garhia
39. Chilaunsa
40. Chirawar
41. Daleeppur Naraini
42. Danpatti
43. Daudpur
44. Dayant Nagar Mata
45. Deoraniyan
46. Dharmangadpur
47. Dhumaspur
48. Dikhatmai
49. Durjanpur
50. Fatehpur Gani
51. Gadda Haar
52. Gagarwala
53. Gazianpur
54. Gaziyanpur
55. Gobarharpur
56. Gokhar
57. Gulalpur
58. Hadua
59. Hajipur Baran
60. Harzapur
61. Hasra
62. Himayunpur
63. Hindupur
64. Hradayarampur
65. Hussainpur
66. Isapur Khas
67. Jagatpur Dikhat Mai
68. Jagatpur Khas
69. Jakha
70. Jalalpur
71. Jalalpur Dikhatmai
72. Jamaura
73. Janaura
74. Jasarajpur
75. Jasmai
76. Jaswantnagar
77. Jhandepur
78. Jilhi
79. Joga
80. Jote
81. Kamalpur Mahmoddia
82. Karaujihar
83. Karpiya
84. Kaua Tanda
85. Kausepur
86. Kulipur
87. Kundhi
88. Kushalpur
89. Lodhipur
90. Maddapur Khas
91. Maddapur Khurd
92. Madhonagar
93. Madhukarpur
94. Madhupuri
95. Mahadiya
96. Mahanandpur
97. Maheshpur
98. Mallai Hussainpur
99. Mallamai
100. Mallunagar
101. Manjhola
102. Manpur Biku
103. Manpur Hari
104. Meerpur Chhadami
105. Mirjapur
106. Mohabbatpur Bhatwara
107. Muddapur Bhogi
108. Mundai
109. Musepur
110. Nabiganj
111. Nagla Baal
112. Nagla Devi
113. Nagla Murar
114. Nagla Pandey
115. Nagla Penth
116. Nagla Sudama
117. Nagthari
118. Naika Mau
119. Nandulia
120. Naseerpur
121. Naurangabad
122. Nijampur
123. Noonari
124. Padamner
125. Palaudhi
126. Paraunkha
127. Patna Tilua
128. Piyapur
129. Pooranpur
130. Pratappur
131. Prempur
132. Puraia
133. Rahuthara
134. Raipur
135. Rakra
136. Ramnagar
137. Ramnagar
138. Rampur
139. Rampura
140. Saidpur
141. Sakat Bewar
142. Sarai Mandu
143. Saraichak Govindpur
144. Shahjahanpur
145. Sherpur Chuharpur
146. Shivsinghpur
147. Shyampur Bhatpura
148. Sultanpur Nevada
149. Syona
150. Takharau Jiwanpur
151. Tal Suhela
152. Tarwa Dewa
153. Tigwan
154. Tikuri
155. Tiliyani
156. Todarpur
157. Umarpur

=== Jagir block ===
The following 57 villages are counted as part of Jagir CD block:

1. Adhar
2. Ajeetganj
3. Allau
4. Aung
5. Baghirua
6. Basawanpur
7. Bhanwat
8. Birampur
9. Birpur Kalan
10. Birpur Khurd
11. Byonti Kalan
12. Chandarpur
13. Chauhanpur
14. Dalpura
15. Dayarampur
16. Dwarikapur
17. Faridpur
18. Gadaipura
19. Goshalpur Gahiar
20. Hatpau
21. Kachhapura
22. Kailanpur
23. Kasadha
24. Korari
25. Kusma Khera
26. Lalpur Adhar
27. Lalpur Meerapur
28. Lekharajpur
29. Madhupuri
30. Maidepur
31. Malikpur
32. Manchhana
33. Mangalpur
34. Maujepur
35. Meerapur Gujarati
36. Merapur Khizarpur
37. Myora Chak Abdullapur
38. Nagla Bari
39. Nagla Gahiar
40. Nagla Kanhar
41. Nagla Miti
42. Nagla Soti
43. Nakhatpur
44. Navada
45. Parigawan
46. Parwatpur
47. Pundai
48. Rajalpur
49. Rajpur Kalan
50. Rajpur Khurd
51. Ratanpur Bara
52. Ratanpur Kirkitch
53. Sagamai (block headquarters)
54. Salempur Parhina
55. Sugaon
56. Sumerpur
57. Tiksuri

=== Kishni block ===
The following 95 villages are counted as part of Kishni CD block:

1. Alawalpur
2. Alilpur Keshavpur
3. Arjunpur
4. Arsara
5. Badanpur
6. Baghauni
7. Bahoranpur
8. Bansar Mau
9. Bariha
10. Barua Chamar
11. Basait
12. Bhadei
13. Chauraipur
14. Chitain
15. Daudpur
16. Dhakaroi
17. Dharauss
18. Dharminpur
19. Diwanpur Sahini
20. Gadanpur Gapcharia
21. Gangdaspur
22. Ghutara Masoompur
23. Gopalpur
24. Gulariapur
25. Harchandpur Kharagpur
26. Hempur
27. Hirauli
28. Husainpur
29. Ichhaipur
30. Illahabad
31. Inderpur Sujanpur
32. Isapur Dikhatmai
33. Jatpura
34. Jawapur
35. Kaithauli
36. Kaithpur
37. Kamalner
38. Kamalpur
39. Khijarpur
40. Khwajapur
41. Kitah
42. Kumhaul
43. Kunhupur
44. Kursanda
45. Kutubpur
46. Legaon
47. Lodhipur Budauli
48. Mahganwan
49. Maholi Shamsherganj
50. Manigaon
51. Mokhampur
52. Murausee
53. Nagathara
54. Nagla Bale
55. Nagla Barhaipur
56. Nagla Baruanadi
57. Nagla Baune
58. Nagla Bhagauti
59. Nagla Birtia
60. Nagla Chunnu
61. Nagla Dinu
62. Nagla Game
63. Nagla Gokul
64. Nagla Jakha
65. Nagla Kale
66. Nagle Khiriya
67. Nagla Khoni
68. Nagla Kumhar
69. Nagla Maholi
70. Nagla Mathuria
71. Nagla Midiya
72. Nagla Murli
73. Nagla Puwayan
74. Naigawan Khiria
75. Paharpur
76. Parasrampur
77. Partappur
78. Pharaijee
79. Pooranpur
80. Ramnagar
81. Rangpur
82. Ratanpur Haripur
83. Ratheh
84. Ratibhanpur
85. Sailpur
86. Sakra
87. Saman
88. Sathigawan
89. Saunasee
90. Shivpur
91. Signee
92. Singhpur
93. Somarpur
94. Tariha
95. Uncha Islamabad
