= Sultanganj, Mainpuri =

Village in Uttar Pradesh, India

Sultanganj
- Village
- Location in Uttar Pradesh, India
- Coordinates: 27.3152°N 79.09699°E
- Country: India
- State: Uttar Pradesh
- District: Mainpuri
- Tehsil: Bhongaon

Area
  - Total: 3.819 km^{2} (1.475 sq mi)

Population (2011)
  - Total: 4,484
  - Density: 1,174/km^{2} (3,041/sq mi)
- Time zone: UTC+5:30 (IST)

Sultanganj (Sultāṅganj) is a village and corresponding community development block in Bhongaon tehsil of Mainpuri district, Uttar Pradesh. As of 2011, it had a population of 4,484, in 751 households.

== Geography ==
Sultanganj is located about 12 km from Bhongaon, the tehsil headquarters.

According to the 2011 census, Sultanganj has a total area of 381.9 hectares, of which 210.5 were currently farmland and 85.2 were under non-agricultural use. 0.8 hectares were occupied by orchards, 17.8 were classified as cultivable but not currently under any agricultural use, and 0 were classified as non-cultivable. No forests or permanent pastures existed on village lands.

== Demographics ==
As of 2011, Sultanganj had a population of 4,484, in 751 households. This population was 53.0% male (2,376) and 47.0% female (2,108). The 0-6 age group numbered 682 (354 male and 328 female), or 15.2% of the total population. 1,132 residents were members of Scheduled Castes, or 25.2% of the total.

The 1981 census recorded Sultanganj as having a population of 3,031 people, in 511 households.

The 1961 census recorded Sultanganj as comprising 5 hamlets, with a total population of 1,743 people (980 male and 763 female), in 354 households and 277 physical houses. The area of the village was given as 952 acres and it had a hospital and post office at that point.

== Economy ==
Sultanganj hosts a market twice per week, on Sundays and Thursdays. Grain, vegetables, and cloth are the main items traded. There is an agricultural credit society, but no bank.

In terms of agriculture, the primary crops grown at Sultanganj are wheat and bajra.

== Infrastructure ==
As of 2011, Sultanganj had 2 primary schools and 1 primary health sub centre as well as a dispensary. Drinking water was provided by well and hand pump; there were no public toilets. The village had a post office but no public library; there was at least some access to electricity for all purposes. Streets were made of both kachcha and pakka materials.

== List of villages under Sultanganj block ==
The following 102 villages are counted as part of Sultanganj CD block:

1. Ahemadpur
2. Ahirwa
3. Alipur Patti
4. Allikhera
5. Asafpur
6. Aurandh
7. Balarpur
8. Balarpur Ramnagar
9. Bara Surajpur
10. Beenamau
11. Bharatpur
12. Bhawani Nagar
13. Bhongaon Dehat
14. Bhojpur
15. Bichhawan
16. Billon
17. Birsinghpur
18. Brijpur
19. Bura Chak Sahara
20. Byonti Khurd
21. Chhachha
22. Chhatripur
23. Daleeppur Kailai
24. Danchaura
25. Darka
26. Daya Ram Pur
27. Devganj
28. Dhanmau
29. Diwanpur Chowdhary
30. Dudhauna
31. Fardpur
32. Fatehpur
33. Ganeshpur
34. Garhiya Govindpur
35. Goshalpur
36. Govindpur
37. Hamirpur
38. Hannukhera
39. Harchandpur Meerapur
40. Harganpur
41. Hussainpur
42. Itoree
43. Jagatpur
44. Jaili Jirauli
45. Jaitoolpur
46. Jalalpur
47. Jambhari
48. Jaramai
49. Jasanpur
50. Jasrathpur
51. Jaswantpur
52. Kamalpur
53. Katka
54. Khatana
55. Kinhawar
56. Lalupura
57. Lehra
58. Maholi Khera
59. Malpur
60. Manikpur
61. Marhari
62. Mayachandpur
63. Meerapur Sujapur
64. Missaura
65. Mohabbatpur
66. Mohanpur
67. Muradpur Nagaria
68. Murhauli
69. Nagla Bhagat
70. Nagla Mitkar
71. Nagla Semar
72. Naka
73. Narsinghpur
74. Paal
75. Padampur
76. Pussaina
77. Rajwana
78. Rakari
79. Ramnagar
80. Rudaunia
81. Rui Sinaura
82. Sahara
83. Sahjadepur
84. Saidpur
85. Sanda
86. Saraiya
87. Sarjanpur
88. Shah Alampur
89. Shahpura
90. Simarai
91. Siwai Bhadaura
92. Sulkhanpur
93. Sultanganj
94. Sunnamai
95. Surjanpur
96. Surjanpur Barkhera
97. Tarapur Chak
98. Tisaulli
99. Tolakpur
100. Udaipur Naraini
101. Usmanpur
