= Lodhipur, Mainpuri =

Village in Uttar Pradesh, India

Lodhipur
- Village
- Location in Uttar Pradesh, India
- Coordinates: 27.28762°N 79.04954°E
- Country: India
- State: Uttar Pradesh
- District: Mainpuri
- Tehsil: Mainpuri

Area
  - Total: 1.27 km^{2} (0.49 sq mi)

Population (2011)
  - Total: 716
  - Density: 564/km^{2} (1,460/sq mi)
- Time zone: UTC+5:30 (IST)

Lodhipur (Lodhīpur) is a village in Mainpuri block of Mainpuri district, Uttar Pradesh. As of 2011, it has a population of 716, in 112 households.

== Demographics ==
As of 2011, Lodhipur had a population of 716, in 112 households. This population was 52.8% male (378) and 47.2% female (338). The 0-6 age group numbered 98 (53 male and 45 female), or 13.7% of the total population. No residents were members of Scheduled Castes.

The 1981 census recorded Lodhipur as having a population of 473 people, in 55 households.

The 1961 census recorded Lodhipur as comprising 1 hamlet, with a total population of 270 people (149 male and 121 female), in 35 households and 25 physical houses. The area of the village was given as 318 acres.

== Infrastructure ==
As of 2011, Lodhipur had 2 primary schools; it did not have any healthcare facilities. Drinking water was provided by well, hand pump, and tube well/borehole; there were no public toilets. The village did not have a post office or public library; there was at least some access to electricity for all purposes. Streets were made of both kachcha and pakka materials.
