= Sunnamai =

Village in Uttar Pradesh, India

- Village
- Location in Uttar Pradesh, India
- Coordinates: 27.37849°N 79.0498°E
- Country: India
- State: Uttar Pradesh
- District: Mainpuri
- Tehsil: Bhongaon

Area
  - Total: 5.12 km^{2} (1.98 sq mi)

Population (2011)
  - Total: 2,683
  - Density: 524/km^{2} (1,360/sq mi)
- Time zone: UTC+5:30 (IST)

Sunnamai (Sunnāmaī) is a village in Sultanganj block of Mainpuri district, Uttar Pradesh. As of 2011, it has a population of 2,683, in 459 households.

== Demographics ==
As of 2011, Sunnamai had a population of 2,683, in 459 households. This population was 54.0% male (1,449) and 46.0% female (1,234). The 0-6 age group numbered 432 (234 male and 198 female), or 16.1% of the total population. 955 residents were members of Scheduled Castes, or 35.6% of the total.

The 1981 census recorded Sunnamai as having a population of 1,437 people, in 218 households.

The 1961 census recorded Sunnamai as comprising 3 hamlets, with a total population of 1,098 people (628 male and 470 female), in 209 households and 194 physical houses. The area of the village was given as 1,249 acres.

== Infrastructure ==
As of 2011, Sunnamai had 2 primary schools; it did not have any healthcare facilities. Drinking water was provided by tap and hand pump; there were no public toilets. The village had post office and public library; as well as at least some access to electricity for residential and agricultural purposes. Streets were made of both kachcha and pakka materials.
