= Pal, Mainpuri =

Village in Uttar Pradesh, India

Pal
- Village
- Location in Uttar Pradesh, India
- Coordinates: 27.27843°N 79.08156°E
- Country: India
- State: Uttar Pradesh
- District: Mainpuri
- Tehsil: Bhongaon

Area
  - Total: 2.242 km^{2} (0.866 sq mi)

Population (2011)
  - Total: 1,397
  - Density: 623.1/km^{2} (1,614/sq mi)
- Time zone: UTC+5:30 (IST)

Pal (Pāl), also transliterated as Paal, is a village in Sultanganj block of Mainpuri district, Uttar Pradesh. As of 2011, it has a population of 1,397, in 229 households.

== Demographics ==
As of 2011, Pal had a population of 1,397, in 229 households. This population was 50.5% male (706) and 49.5% female (691). The 0-6 age group numbered 203 (94 male and 109 female), or 14.5% of the total population. 274 residents were members of Scheduled Castes, or 19.6% of the total.

The 1981 census recorded Pal as having a population of 742 people, in 132 households.

The 1961 census recorded Pal as comprising 1 hamlet, with a total population of 521 people (270 male and 251 female), in 102 households and 77 physical houses. The area of the village was given as 774 acres.

== Infrastructure ==
As of 2011, Pal had 1 primary school; it did not have any healthcare facilities. Drinking water was provided by hand pump and tube well/borehole; there were no public toilets. The village did not have a post office or public library; there was at least some access to electricity for all purposes. Streets were made of both kachcha and pakka materials.
