= Nagla Garhu =

Village in Uttar Pradesh, India

- Village
- Location in Uttar Pradesh, India
- Coordinates: 27.34118°N 79.00159°E
- Country: India
- State: Uttar Pradesh
- District: Mainpuri
- Tehsil: Mainpuri

Area
  - Total: 4.372 km^{2} (1.688 sq mi)

Population (2011)
  - Total: 2,001
  - Density: 457.7/km^{2} (1,185/sq mi)
- Time zone: UTC+5:30 (IST)

Nagla Garhu (Naglā Gaḍhū) is a village in Mainpuri block of Mainpuri district, Uttar Pradesh, India. As of 2011, it had a population of 2,001, in 321 households.

== Demographics ==
As of 2011, Nagla Garhu had a population of 2,001, in 321 households. This population was 54.0% male (1,081) and 46.0% female (920). The 0-6 age group numbered 244 (132 male and 112 female), or 12.2% of the total population. 60 residents were members of Scheduled Castes, or 3.0% of the total.

The 1981 census recorded Nagla Garhu as having a population of 1,247 people, in 218 households.

The 1961 census recorded Nagla Garhu as comprising 2 hamlets, with a total population of 789 people (435 male and 354 female), in 156 households and 94 physical houses. The area of the village was given as 742 acres.

== Infrastructure ==
As of 2011, Nagla Garhu had 1 primary school; it did not have any healthcare facilities. Drinking water was provided by hand pump; there were no public toilets. The village had a post office and public library, as well as at least some access to electricity for all purposes. Streets were made of both kachcha and pakka materials.
