= Jat Khera =

Village in Uttar Pradesh, India

- Village
- Location in Uttar Pradesh, India
- Coordinates: 27.1725283°N 78.9276925°E
- Country: India
- State: Uttar Pradesh
- District: Mainpuri
- Tehsil: Mainpuri

Area
  - Total: 2.605 km^{2} (1.006 sq mi)

Population (2011)
  - Total: 513
  - Density: 197/km^{2} (510/sq mi)
- Time zone: UTC+5:30 (IST)

Jat Khera (Jāṭ Kheṛā) is a village in the Mainpuri block of Mainpuri district, Uttar Pradesh, India. As of 2011, it had a population of 513, in 75 households.

== Demographics ==
As of 2011, Jat Khera had a population of 513, in 75 households. This population was 53.4% male (274) and 46.6% female (239). The 0-6 age group numbered 80 (44 male and 36 female), or 15.6% of the total population. 13 residents were members of the Scheduled Castes, or 2.5% of the total.

The 1981 census recorded Jat Khera as having a population of 275 people, in 39 households.

The 1961 census recorded Jat Khera as comprising 1 hamlet, with a total population of 185 people (106 male and 79 female), in 31 households and 24 physical houses. The area of the village was given as 646 acres.

== Infrastructure ==
As of 2011, Jat Khera had 1 primary school; it did not have any healthcare facilities. Drinking water was provided by tap, well, hand pump, and tube well; there were no public toilets. The village had a post office but no public library; there was at least some access to electricity for all purposes. Streets were made of both kachcha and pakka materials.
