= Rui Sinaura =

Village in Uttar Pradesh, India

- Village
- Location in Uttar Pradesh, India
- Coordinates: 27.2339239°N 79.1295291°E
- Country: India
- State: Uttar Pradesh
- District: Mainpuri
- Tehsil: Bhongaon

Area
  - Total: 8.216 km^{2} (3.172 sq mi)

Population (2011)
  - Total: 5,145
  - Density: 626.2/km^{2} (1,622/sq mi)
- Time zone: UTC+5:30 (IST)

Rui Sinaura (Rūī Sinaurā) is a village in Sultanganj block of Mainpuri district, Uttar Pradesh. As of 2011, it has a population of 5,145, in 846 households.

Rui Sinaura is a village located in Bhogaon tehsil of Mainpuri district in Uttar Pradesh, India. It is situated 3km away from sub-district headquarter Bhogaon (tehsildar office) and 13km away from district headquarter Mainpuri.

== Demographics ==
As of 2011, Rui Sinaura had a population of 5,145, in 846 households. This population was 53.4% male (2,746) and 46.6% female (2,399). The 0-6 age group numbered 854 (469 male and 385 female), or 16.6% of the total population. 1,016 residents were members of Scheduled Castes, or 19.7% of the total.

The 1981 census recorded Rui Sinaura as having a population of 2,855 people, in 559 households.

The 1961 census recorded Rui Sinaura as comprising 6 hamlets, with a total population of 2,179 people (1,179 male and 1,000 female), in 438 households and 324 physical houses. The area of the village was given as 1,269 acres.

== Infrastructure ==
As of 2011, Rui Sinaura had 2 primary schools; it did not have any healthcare facilities. Drinking water was provided by hand pump and tube well/borehole; there were no public toilets. The village had a post office but no public library; there was at least some access to electricity for all purposes. Streets were made of both kachcha and pakka materials.
