= Madhau =

Village in Uttar Pradesh, India

- Village
- Location in Uttar Pradesh, India
- Coordinates: 27.23002°N 78.99269°E
- Country: India
- State: Uttar Pradesh
- District: Mainpuri
- Tehsil: Mainpuri

Area
  - Total: 2.448 km^{2} (0.945 sq mi)

Population (2011)
  - Total: 4,118
  - Density: 1,682/km^{2} (4,357/sq mi)
- Time zone: UTC+5:30 (IST)

Madhau (Madhāū) is a village in Mainpuri block of Mainpuri district, Uttar Pradesh, India. As of 2011, it had a population of 4,118, in 719 households.

== Demographics ==
As of 2011, Madhau had a population of 4,118, in 719 households. This population was 52.8% male (2,176) and 47.2% female (1,942). The 0-6 age group numbered 703 (361 male and 342 female), or 17.1% of the total population. 1,081 residents were members of Scheduled Castes, or 26.3% of the total.

The 1981 census recorded Madhau as having a population of 1,658 people, in 284 households.

The 1961 census recorded Madhau as comprising 4 hamlets, with a total population of 1,086 people (607 male and 479 female), in 183 households and 145 physical houses. The area of the village was given as 609 acres.

== Infrastructure ==
As of 2011, Madhau had 3 primary schools; it did not have any healthcare facilities. Drinking water was provided by hand pump; there were no public toilets. The village had a post office but no public library; there was at least some access to electricity for all purposes. Streets were made of both kachcha and pakka materials.
