= Aurandh =

Village in Uttar Pradesh, India

- Village
- Location in Uttar Pradesh, India
- Coordinates: 27.33851°N 79.1272°E
- Country: India
- State: Uttar Pradesh
- District: Mainpuri
- Tehsil: Bhongaon

Area
  - Total: 10.532 km^{2} (4.066 sq mi)

Population (2011)
  - Total: 7,237
  - Density: 687.1/km^{2} (1,780/sq mi)
- Time zone: UTC+5:30 (IST)

Aurandh is a village in Sultanganj block of Mainpuri district, Uttar Pradesh, India. Besides the main village site, several subsidiary hamlets are also attached to the village for administrative purposes. As of 2011, it had a population of 7,237, in 1,300 households.

== Geography ==
Aurandh is located about 3 km north of Sultanganj and 16 km north of Mainpuri. There is a large tank on the west side of the village.

According to the 2011 census, Aurandh has a total area of 1,053.2 hectares, of which 825.8 were currently farmland and 87.4 were under non-agricultural use. 10.6 hectares were occupied by orchards, 0 were occupied by permanent pastures, 0 were classified as cultivable but not currently under any agricultural use, and 0 were classified as non-cultivable. There were also 14.4 hectares of forests on village lands.

== History ==
In 1901, Aurandh had a population of 2,400, and consisted of 9 distinct settlements: the main village plus 8 subsidiary hamlets. There was a village school at that point.

== Demographics ==
As of 2011, Aurandh had a population of 7,237, in 1,300 households. This population was 53.2% male (3,847) and 46.8% female (3,390). The 0-6 age group numbered 1,084 (567 male and 517 female), or 15.0% of the total population. 616 residents were members of Scheduled Castes, or 8.5% of the total.

The 1981 census recorded Aurandh as having a population of 4,862 people, in 909 households.

The 1961 census recorded Aurandh as comprising 10 hamlets, with a total population of 3,549 people (2,020 male and 1,529 female), in 732 households and 604 physical houses. The area of the village was given as 2,625 acres and it had a post office at that point.

== Infrastructure ==
As of 2011, Aurandh had 4 primary schools. Drinking water was provided by hand pump and tube well; there were no public toilets. The village had a post office but no public library; there was at least some access to electricity for all purposes. Streets were made of both kachcha and pakka materials.
