= Marhari, Mainpuri =

Village in Uttar Pradesh, India

Marhari
- Village
- Location in Uttar Pradesh, India
- Coordinates: 27.40968°N 79.10742°E
- Country: India
- State: Uttar Pradesh
- District: Mainpuri
- Tehsil: Bhongaon

Area
  - Total: 2.438 km^{2} (0.941 sq mi)

Population (2011)
  - Total: 2,048
  - Density: 840.0/km^{2} (2,176/sq mi)
- Time zone: UTC+5:30 (IST)
- PIN: 205267

Marhari (Marharī) is a village in Sultanganj block of Mainpuri district, Uttar Pradesh. As of 2011, it has a population of 2,048, in 324 households.

== Demographics ==
As of 2011, Marhari had a population of 2,048, in 324 households. This population was 56.8% male (1,164) and 43.2% female (884). The 0-6 age group numbered 357 (217 male and 140 female), or 17.4% of the total population. 158 residents were members of Scheduled Castes, or 7.7% of the total.

The 1981 census recorded Marhari as having a population of 1,396 people, in 230 households.

The 1961 census recorded Marhari as comprising 2 hamlets, with a total population of 974 people (537 male and 437 female), in 188 households and 135 houses. The area of the village was given as 602 acres.

== Infrastructure ==
As of 2011, Marhari had 1 primary school; it did not have any healthcare facilities. Drinking water was provided by well, hand pump, and tube well/borehole; there were no public toilets. The village had a post office and public library, as well as at least some access to electricity for all purposes. Streets were made of both kachcha and pakka materials.
