= Manikpur, Mainpuri =

Village in Uttar Pradesh, India

Manikpur
- Village
- Location in Uttar Pradesh, India
- Coordinates: 27.31364°N 79.17669°E
- Country: India
- State: Uttar Pradesh
- District: Mainpuri
- Tehsil: Bhongaon

Area
  - Total: 2.315 km^{2} (0.894 sq mi)

Population (2011)
  - Total: 2,521
  - Density: 1,089/km^{2} (2,820/sq mi)
- Time zone: UTC+5:30 (IST)

Manikpur (Māṇikpur) is a village in Sultanganj block of Mainpuri district, Uttar Pradesh, India. As of 2011, it had a population of 2,521, in 453 households.

== Demographics ==
As of 2011, Manikpur had a population of 2,521, in 453 households. This population was 51.1% male (1,287) and 48.9% female (1,234). The 0-6 age group numbered 360 (169 male and 191 female), or 14.3% of the total population. 532 residents were members of Scheduled Castes, or 21.1% of the total.

The 1981 census recorded Manikpur as having a population of 1,687 people, in 286 households.

The 1961 census recorded Manikpur as comprising 3 hamlets, with a total population of 1,176 people (637 male and 539 female), in 69 households and 41 physical houses. The area of the village was given as 497 acres.

== Infrastructure ==
As of 2011, Manikpur had 2 primary school; it did not have any healthcare facilities. Drinking water was provided by hand pump and tube well/borehole; there were no public toilets. The village had a post office but no public library; there was at least some access to electricity for all purposes. Streets were made of both kachcha and pakka materials.
