= Sanda, Mainpuri =

Village in Uttar Pradesh, India

Sanda
- Village
- Location in Uttar Pradesh, India
- Coordinates: 27.40917°N 79.07508°E
- Country: India
- State: Uttar Pradesh
- District: Mainpuri
- Tehsil: Bhongaon

Area
  - Total: 3.829 km^{2} (1.478 sq mi)

Population (2011)
  - Total: 1,735
  - Density: 453.1/km^{2} (1,174/sq mi)
- Time zone: UTC+5:30 (IST)
- PIN: 205267

Sanda (Sā̃ḍā) is a village in Sultanganj block of Mainpuri district, Uttar Pradesh. As of 2011, it has a population of 1,735, in 301 households.

== Demographics ==
As of 2011, Sanda had a population of 1,735, in 301 households. This population was 53.3% male (925) and 46.7% female (810). The 0-6 age group numbered 258 (131 male and 127 female), or 14.9% of the total population. 513 residents were members of Scheduled Castes, or 29.6% of the total.

The 1981 census recorded Sanda as having a population of 1,001 people, in 194 households.

The 1961 census recorded Sanda as comprising 4 hamlets, with a total population of 808 people (421 male and 387 female), in 165 households and 143 physical houses. The area of the village was given as 917 acres.

== Infrastructure ==
As of 2011, Sanda had 1 primary school and 1 primary health centre. Drinking water was provided by well, hand pump, and tube well/borehole; there were no public toilets. The village had a post office and public library, as well as at least some access to electricity for all purposes. Streets were made of both kachcha and pakka materials.
