= Malpur, Mainpuri =

Village in Uttar Pradesh, India

Malpur
- Village
- Location in Uttar Pradesh, India
- Coordinates: 27.30253°N 79.1116°E
- Country: India
- State: Uttar Pradesh
- District: Mainpuri
- Tehsil: Bhongaon

Area
  - Total: 2.835 km^{2} (1.095 sq mi)

Population (2011)
  - Total: 1,682
  - Density: 593.3/km^{2} (1,537/sq mi)
- Time zone: UTC+5:30 (IST)

Malpur (Mālpur) is a village in Sultanganj block of Mainpuri district, Uttar Pradesh. As of 2011, it had a population of 1,682, in 300 households.

== Demographics ==
As of 2011, Malpur had a population of 1,682, in 300 households. This population was 51.4% male (865) and 48.6% female (817). The 0-6 age group numbered 240 (127 male and 113 female), or 14.3% of the total population. 282 residents were members of Scheduled Castes, or 16.8% of the total.

The 1981 census recorded Malpur as having a population of 845 people, in 151 households.

The 1961 census recorded Malpur as comprising 1 hamlet, with a total population of 557 people (283 male and 274 female), in 98 households and 86 physical houses. The area of the village was given as 696 acres.

== Infrastructure ==
As of 2011, Malpur had 1 primary school; it did not have any healthcare facilities. Drinking water was provided by hand pump and tube well/borehole; there were no public toilets. The village did not have a post office or public library; there was at least some access to electricity for all purposes. Streets were made of both kachcha and pakka materials.
