= Saraiya, Mainpuri =

Village in Uttar Pradesh, India

Saraiya
- Village
- Location in Uttar Pradesh, India
- Coordinates: 27.30056°N 79.22522°E
- Country: India
- State: Uttar Pradesh
- District: Mainpuri
- Tehsil: Bhongaon

Area
  - Total: 1.982 km^{2} (0.765 sq mi)

Population (2011)
  - Total: 439
  - Density: 221/km^{2} (574/sq mi)
- Time zone: UTC+5:30 (IST)

Saraiya (Saraiyā) is a village in Sultanganj block of Mainpuri district, Uttar Pradesh. As of 2011, it has a population of 439, in 82 households.

== Demographics ==
As of 2011, Saraiya had a population of 439, in 82 households. This population was 53.3% male (234) and 46.7% female (205). The 0-6 age group numbered 70 (34 male and 36 female), or 15.9% of the total population. No residents were members of Scheduled Castes.

The 1981 census recorded Saraiya as having a population of 300 people, in 116 households.

The 1961 census recorded Saraiya as comprising 2 hamlets, with a total population of 224 people (103 male and 121 female), in 33 households and 24 physical houses. The area of the village was given as 295 acres.

== Infrastructure ==
As of 2011, Saraiya did not have any schools or healthcare facilities. Drinking water was provided by tap, well, hand pump, and tube well/borehole; there were no public toilets. The village had a post office but no public library; there was at least some access to electricity for all purposes. Streets were made of kachcha materials.
