= Kinhawar =

Village in Uttar Pradesh, India

- Village
- Location in Uttar Pradesh, India
- Coordinates: 27.33871°N 79.09336°E
- Country: India
- State: Uttar Pradesh
- District: Mainpuri
- Tehsil: Bhongaon

Area
  - Total: 7.168 km^{2} (2.768 sq mi)

Population (2011)
  - Total: 4,888
  - Density: 681.9/km^{2} (1,766/sq mi)
- Time zone: UTC+5:30 (IST)

Kinhawar (Kinhāwar) is a village in Sultanganj block of Mainpuri district, Uttar Pradesh. As of 2011, it has a population of 4,888, in 817 households.

== Demographics ==
As of 2011, Kinhawar had a population of 4,888, in 817 households. This population was 52.7% male (2,578) and 47.3% female (2,310). The 0-6 age group numbered 762 (396 male and 366 female), or 15.6% of the total population. 1,531 residents were members of Scheduled Castes, or 10.9% of the total.

The 1981 census recorded Kinhawar as having a population of 2,720 people, in 467 households.

The 1961 census recorded Kinhawar as comprising 7 hamlets, with a total population of 1,873 people (1,014 male and 859 female), in 353 households and 272 physical houses. The area of the village was given as 1,796 acres.

== Infrastructure ==
As of 2011, Kinhawar had 1 primary school; it did not have any healthcare facilities. Drinking water was provided by tap, hand pump, and tube well/borehole; there were no public toilets. The village had a post office and public library, as well as at least some access to electricity for all purposes. Streets were made of both kachcha and pakka materials.
