= Sansarpur, Mainpuri =

Village in Uttar Pradesh, India

Sansarpur
- Village
- Location in Uttar Pradesh, India
- Coordinates: 27.25104°N 79.07062°E
- Country: India
- State: Uttar Pradesh
- District: Mainpuri
- Tehsil: Mainpuri

Area
  - Total: 4.33 km^{2} (1.67 sq mi)

Population (2011)
  - Total: 5,182
  - Density: 1,200/km^{2} (3,100/sq mi)
- Time zone: UTC+5:30 (IST)
- PIN: 205001

Sansarpur (Sansārpur) is a village in Mainpuri block of Mainpuri district, Uttar Pradesh, India. As of 2011, it had a population of 5,182, in 826 households.

== Demographics ==
As of 2011, Sansarpur had a population of 5,182, in 826 households. This population was 53.7% male (2,783) and 46.3% female (2,399). The 0-6 age group numbered 805 (435 male and 370 female), or 15.5% of the total population. 1,680 residents were members of Scheduled Castes, or 32.4% of the total.

The 1961 census recorded Sansarpur as comprising 4 hamlets, with a total population of 1,726 people (961 male and 765 female), in 345 households and 343 physical houses. The area of the village was given as 1,139 acres.

== Infrastructure ==
As of 2011, Sansarpur had 1 primary school; it did not have any healthcare facilities. Drinking water was provided by hand pump and tube well; there were no public toilets. The village had a post office but no public library; there was at least some access to electricity for all purposes. Streets were made of both kachcha and pakka materials.
