= Sarjanpur =

Village in Uttar Pradesh, India

- Village
- Location in Uttar Pradesh, India
- Coordinates: 27.22712°N 79.20304°E
- Country: India
- State: Uttar Pradesh
- District: Mainpuri
- Tehsil: Bhongaon

Area
  - Total: 1.04 km^{2} (0.40 sq mi)

Population (2011)
  - Total: 830
  - Density: 800/km^{2} (2,100/sq mi)
- Time zone: UTC+5:30 (IST)

Sarjanpur (Sarjanpur) is a village in Sultanganj block of Mainpuri district, Uttar Pradesh, India. As of 2011, it had a population of 830, in 144 households.

== Demographics ==
As of 2011, Sarjanpur had a population of 830, in 144 households. This population was 56.1% male (466) and 43.9% female (364). The 0-6 age group numbered 149 (86 male and 63 female), or 18.0% of the total population. 574 residents were members of Scheduled Castes, or 69.2% of the total.

The 1981 census recorded Sarjanpur as having a population of 403 people, in 77 households.

The 1961 census recorded Sarjanpur as comprising 2 hamlets, with a total population of 288 people (163 male and 125 female), in 66 households and 46 physical houses. The area of the village was given as 445 acres.

== Infrastructure ==
As of 2011, Sarjanpur had 2 primary schools; it did not have any healthcare facilities. Drinking water was provided by tap, hand pump, and tube well/borehole; there were no public toilets. The village had a post office but no public library; there was at least some access to electricity for all purposes. Streets were made of both kachcha and pakka materials.
