= Jalalpur, Sultanganj =

Village in Uttar Pradesh, India

Jalalpur
- Village
- Location in Uttar Pradesh, India
- Coordinates: 27.2939°N 79.15357°E
- Country: India
- State: Uttar Pradesh
- District: Mainpuri
- Tehsil: Bhongaon

Area
  - Total: 1.662 km^{2} (0.642 sq mi)

Population (2011)
  - Total: 1,024
  - Density: 616.1/km^{2} (1,596/sq mi)
- Time zone: UTC+5:30 (IST)

Jalalpur (Jalālpur) is a village in Sultanganj block of Mainpuri district, Uttar Pradesh. As of 2011, it has a population of 1,024, in 175 households.

== Demographics ==
As of 2011, Jalalpur had a population of 1,024, in 175 households. This population was 54.1% male (554) and 45.9% female (470). The 0-6 age group numbered 168 (82 male and 86 female), or 16.4% of the total population. 385 residents were members of Scheduled Castes, or 37.6% of the total.

The 1981 census recorded Jalalpur as having a population of 643 people, in 112 households.

The 1961 census recorded Jalalpur as comprising 1 hamlet, with a total population of 520 people (285 male and 235 female), in 96 households and 81 physical houses. The area of the village was given as 453 acres.

== Infrastructure ==
As of 2011, Jalalpur had 1 primary school; it did not have any healthcare facilities. Drinking water was provided by hand pump; there were no public toilets. The village had a post office and public library, as well as at least some access to electricity for all purposes. Streets were made of pakka materials.
