= Balarpur =

Village in Uttar Pradesh, India

- Village
- Location in Uttar Pradesh, India
- Coordinates: 27.41145°N 79.09193°E
- Country: India
- State: Uttar Pradesh
- District: Mainpuri
- Tehsil: Bhongaon

Area
  - Total: 1.445 km^{2} (0.558 sq mi)

Population (2011)
  - Total: 1,553
  - Density: 1,075/km^{2} (2,784/sq mi)
- Time zone: UTC+5:30 (IST)
- PIN: 205267

Balarpur (Balārpur) is a village in Sultanganj block of Mainpuri district, Uttar Pradesh, India. As of 2011, it had a population of 1,553, in 248 households.

== Demographics ==
As of 2011, Balarpur had a population of 1,553, in 248 households. This population was 53.9% male (837) and 46.1% female (716). The 0-6 age group numbered 210 (117 male and 93 female), or 13.5% of the total population. 344 residents were members of Scheduled Castes, or 22.2% of the total.

The 1981 census recorded Balarpur as having a population of 910 people, in 161 households.

The 1961 census recorded Balarpur as comprising two hamlets, with a total population of 699 people (373 male and 326 female), in 118 households and 111 physical houses. The area of the village was given as 400 acres.

== Infrastructure ==
As of 2011, Balarpur had one primary school and one primary health centre. Drinking water was provided by well, hand pump, and tube well/borehole; there were no public toilets. The village had a post office and public library, as well as at least some access to electricity for all purposes. Streets were made of both kachcha and pakka materials.
