= Surjanpur =

Village in Uttar Pradesh, India

- Village
- Location in Uttar Pradesh, India
- Coordinates: 27.30002°N 79.07086°E
- Country: India
- State: Uttar Pradesh
- District: Mainpuri
- Tehsil: Bhongaon

Area
  - Total: 7.886 km^{2} (3.045 sq mi)

Population (2011)
  - Total: 3,306
  - Density: 419.2/km^{2} (1,086/sq mi)
- Time zone: UTC+5:30 (IST)

Surjanpur (Sūrjanpur) is a village in Sultanganj block of Mainpuri district, Uttar Pradesh, India. As of 2011, it had a population of 3,306, in 491 households.

== Demographics ==
As of 2011, Surjanpur had a population of 3,306, in 491 households. This population was 53.9% male (1,782) and 46.1% female (1,524). The 0-6 age group numbered 593 (308 male and 285 female), or 17.9% of the total population. 366 residents were members of Scheduled Castes, or 11.1% of the total.

The 1981 census recorded Surjanpur as having a population of 1,578 people, in 241 households.

The 1961 census recorded Surjanpur as comprising 3 hamlets, with a total population of 1,053 people (572 male and 481 female), in 190 households and 142 physical houses. The area of the village was given as 1,951 acres.

== Infrastructure ==
As of 2011, Surjanpur had 1 primary school; it did not have any healthcare facilities. Drinking water was provided by hand pump and tube well/borehole; there were no public toilets. The village had a post office and public library, as well as at least some access to electricity for all purposes. Streets were made of both kachcha and pakka materials.
