= Khatana, Mainpuri =

Village in Uttar Pradesh, India

Khatana
- Village
- Location in Uttar Pradesh, India
- Coordinates: 27.35122°N 79.10016°E
- Country: India
- State: Uttar Pradesh
- District: Mainpuri
- Tehsil: Bhongaon

Area
  - Total: 1.565 km^{2} (0.604 sq mi)

Population (2011)
  - Total: 1,475
  - Density: 942.5/km^{2} (2,441/sq mi)
- Time zone: UTC+5:30 (IST)
- PIN: 206252

Khatana (Khaṭānā) is a village in Sultanganj block of Mainpuri district, Uttar Pradesh, India. As of 2011, it had a population of 1,475, in 237 households.

== Demographics ==
As of 2011, Khatana had a population of 1,475, in 237 households. This population was 53.4% male (787) and 46.6% female (688). The 0-6 age group numbered 290 (154 male and 136 female), or 19.7% of the total population. 673 residents were members of Scheduled Castes, or 45.6% of the total.

The 1981 census recorded Khatana as having a population of 835 people, in 143 households.

The 1961 census recorded Khatana as comprising 2 hamlets, with a total population of 562 people (290 male and 272 female), in 107 households and 90 physical houses. The area of the village was given as 387 acres.

== Infrastructure ==
As of 2011, Khatana had 1 primary school; it did not have any healthcare facilities. Drinking water was provided by hand pump and tube well; there were no public toilets. The village had a post office and a public library, as well as at least some access to electricity for all purposes. Streets were made of both kachcha and pakka materials.

== See also ==
- khatana
- Katana, Samurai sword
