= Bara Surajpur =

Village in Uttar Pradesh, India

- Village
- Location in Uttar Pradesh, India
- Coordinates: 27.2817337°N 79.1720653°E
- Country: India
- State: Uttar Pradesh
- District: Mainpuri
- Tehsil: Bhongaon

Area
  - Total: 6.117 km^{2} (2.362 sq mi)

Population (2011)
  - Total: 2,796
  - Density: 457.1/km^{2} (1,184/sq mi)
- Time zone: UTC+5:30 (IST)

Bara Surajpur (Barā Sūrajpur) is a village in Sultanganj block of Mainpuri district, Uttar Pradesh. As of 2011, it has a population of 2,796, in 453 households.

== Demographics ==
As of 2011, Bara Surajpur had a population of 2,796, in 453 households. This population was 51.8% male (1,447) and 48.2% female (1,349). The 0-6 age group numbered 409 (219 male and 190 female), or 14.6% of the total population. 126 residents were members of Scheduled Castes, or 4.5% of the total.

The 1981 census recorded Bara Surajpur as having a population of 1,588 people, in 277 households.

The 1961 census recorded Bara Surajpur as comprising 5 hamlets, with a total population of 1,177 people (607 male and 570 female), in 217 households and 174 physical houses. The area of the village was given as 1,028 acres.

== Infrastructure ==
As of 2011, Bara Surajpur had 1 primary school; it did not have any healthcare facilities. Drinking water was provided by hand pump and tube well/borehole; there were no public toilets. The village had a post office but no public library; there was at least some access to electricity for all purposes. Streets were made of both kachcha and pakka materials.
