= Byonti Khurd =

Village in Uttar Pradesh, India

- Village
- Location in Uttar Pradesh, India
- Coordinates: 27.22513°N 79.10215°E
- Country: India
- State: Uttar Pradesh
- District: Mainpuri
- Tehsil: Bhongaon

Area
  - Total: 2.482 km^{2} (0.958 sq mi)

Population (2011)
  - Total: 2,801
  - Density: 1,129/km^{2} (2,923/sq mi)
- Time zone: UTC+5:30 (IST)

Byonti Khurd (Byontī Khurd) is a village in Sultanganj block of Mainpuri district, Uttar Pradesh, India. As of 2011, it had a population of 2,801, in 429 households.

== Demographics ==
As of 2011, Byonti Khurd had a population of 2,801, in 429 households. This population was 53.3% male (1,494) and 46.7% female (1,307). The 0-6 age group numbered 424 (234 male and 190 female), or 15.1% of the total population. 161 residents were members of Scheduled Castes, or 5.7% of the total.

The 1981 census recorded Byonti Khurd as having a population of 1,423 people, in 219 households.

The 1961 census recorded Byonti Khurd (as "Bionti Khurd") as comprising 1 hamlet, with a total population of 993 people (525 male and 468 female), in 175 households and 110 physical houses. The area of the village was given as 785 acres.

== Infrastructure ==
As of 2011, Byonti Khurd had 2 primary schools and 1 primary health centre. Drinking water was provided by hand pump and tube well/borehole; there were no public toilets. The village had a post office but no public library; there was at least some access to electricity for all purposes. Streets were made of pakka materials.
