= Bhojpur, Mainpuri =

Village in Uttar Pradesh, India

Bhojpur
- Village
- Location in Uttar Pradesh, India
- Coordinates: 27.41941°N 79.10016°E
- Country: India
- State: Uttar Pradesh
- District: Mainpuri
- Tehsil: Bhongaon

Area
  - Total: 2.103 km^{2} (0.812 sq mi)

Population (2011)
  - Total: 1,092
  - Density: 519.3/km^{2} (1,345/sq mi)
- Time zone: UTC+5:30 (IST)

Bhojpur (Bhojpur) is a village in Sultanganj block of Mainpuri district, Uttar Pradesh, India. As of 2011, it had a population of 1,092, in 174 households.

== Demographics ==
As of 2011, Bhojpur had a population of 1,092, in 174 households. This population was 57.1% male (623) and 42.9% female (469). The 0-6 age group numbered 171 (89 male and 82 female), or 15.7% of the total population. 134 residents were members of Scheduled Castes, or 12.3% of the total.

The 1981 census recorded Bhojpur (as "Bhojpura") as having a population of 575 people, in 100 households.

The 1961 census recorded Bhojpur as comprising 2 hamlets, with a total population of 367 people (203 male and 164 female), in 78 households and 46 physical houses. The area of the village was given as 525 acres.

== Infrastructure ==
As of 2011, Bhojpur had 1 primary school; it did not have any healthcare facilities. Drinking water was provided by well, hand pump, and tube well/borehole; there were no public toilets. The village had a public library but no post office; there was at least some access to electricity for all purposes. Streets were made of both kachcha and pakka materials.
