= Barauli, Mainpuri =

Village in Uttar Pradesh, India

Barauli
- Village
- Location in Uttar Pradesh, India
- Coordinates: 27.18279°N 78.93455°E
- Country: India
- State: Uttar Pradesh
- District: Mainpuri
- Tehsil: Mainpuri

Area
  - Total: 3.501 km^{2} (1.352 sq mi)

Population (2011)
  - Total: 2,018
  - Density: 576.4/km^{2} (1,493/sq mi)
- Time zone: UTC+5:30 (IST)

Barauli (Baraulī) is a village in Mainpuri block of Mainpuri district, Uttar Pradesh. As of 2011, it has a population of 2,018, in 348 households.

== Geography ==
There is a prominent jhil at Barauli, and railway tracks also crosses village lands.

== Demographics ==
As of 2011, Barauli had a population of 2,018, in 348 households. This population was 51.5% male (1,039) and 48.5% female (979). The 0-6 age group numbered 342 (179 male and 163 female), or 16.9% of the total population. 606 residents were members of Scheduled Castes, or 30.0% of the total.

The 1981 census recorded Barauli (as "Barawali") as having a population of 1,328 people, in 210 households.

The 1961 census recorded Barauli as comprising 6 hamlets, with a total population of 937 people (506 male and 431 female), in 180 households and 147 physical houses. The area of the village was given as 971 acres.

== Infrastructure ==
As of 2011, Barauli had 1 primary school; it did not have any healthcare facilities. Drinking water was provided by well, hand pump, and tube well; there were no public toilets. The village had a post office but no public library; there was at least some access to electricity for all purposes. Streets were made of both kachcha and pakka materials.
