= Nagla Semar =

Village in Uttar Pradesh, India

- Village
- Location in Uttar Pradesh, India
- Coordinates: 27.39353°N 79.06561°E
- Country: India
- State: Uttar Pradesh
- District: Mainpuri
- Tehsil: Bhongaon

Area
  - Total: 1.951 km^{2} (0.753 sq mi)

Population (2011)
  - Total: 2,256
  - Density: 1,156/km^{2} (2,995/sq mi)
- Time zone: UTC+5:30 (IST)
- PIN: 205267

Nagla Semar (Naglā Semar) is a village in Sultanganj block of Mainpuri district, Uttar Pradesh. As of 2011, it had a population of 2,256, in 355 households.

== Demographics ==
As of 2011, Nagla Semar had a population of 2,256, in 355 households. This population was 53.0% male (1,196) and 47.0% female (1,060). The 0-6 age group numbered 431 (230 male and 201 female), or 19.1% of the total population. 447 residents were members of Scheduled Castes, or 19.8% of the total.

The 1981 census recorded Nagla Semar as having a population of 1,206 people, in 237 households.

The 1961 census recorded Nagla Semar as comprising 5 hamlets, with a total population of 1,046 people (566 male and 480 female), in 190 households and 114 physical houses. The area of the village was given as 480 acres and it was then counted as part of Kuraoli CD block.

== Infrastructure ==
As of 2011, Nagla Semar had 1 primary school; it did not have any healthcare facilities. Drinking water was provided by well, hand pump, and tube well/borehole; there were no public toilets. The village had a post office and public library, as well as at least some access to electricity for all purposes. Streets were made of pakka materials.
