= Jaramai, Sultanganj =

Village in Uttar Pradesh, India

Jaramai
- Village
- Location in Uttar Pradesh, India
- Coordinates: 27.38299°N 79.04478°E
- Country: India
- State: Uttar Pradesh
- District: Mainpuri
- Tehsil: Bhongaon

Area
  - Total: 2.535 km^{2} (0.979 sq mi)

Population (2011)
  - Total: 2,579
  - Density: 1,017/km^{2} (2,635/sq mi)
- Time zone: UTC+5:30 (IST)

Jaramai (Jarāmaī) is a village in Sultanganj block of Mainpuri district, Uttar Pradesh. As of 2011, it has a population of 2,579, in 439 households.

== Demographics ==
As of 2011, Jaramai had a population of 2,579, in 439 households. This population was 54.7% male (1,412) and 45.3% female (1,167). The 0-6 age group numbered 472 (254 male and 218 female), or 18.3% of the total population. 1,605 residents were members of Scheduled Castes, or 62.2% of the total.

The 1981 census recorded Jaramai as having a population of 1,379 people, in 267 households.

The 1961 census recorded Jaramai as comprising 4 hamlets, with a total population of 1,039 people (543 male and 496 female), in 187 households and 140 physical houses. The area of the village was given as 629 acres.

== Infrastructure ==
As of 2011, Jaramai had 1 primary school; it did not have any healthcare facilities. Drinking water was provided by hand pump; there were no public toilets. The village had a post office but no public library; there was at least some access to electricity for residential and agricultural purposes. Streets were made of kachcha materials.
