= Nagla Bhagat =

Village in Uttar Pradesh, India

- Village
- Location in Uttar Pradesh, India
- Coordinates: 27.37224°N 79.07695°E
- Country: India
- State: Uttar Pradesh
- District: Mainpuri
- Tehsil: Bhongaon

Area
  - Total: 0.832 km^{2} (0.321 sq mi)

Population (2011)
  - Total: 730
  - Density: 880/km^{2} (2,300/sq mi)
- Time zone: UTC+5:30 (IST)
- PIN: 205267

Nagla Bhagat is a village in Sultanganj block of Mainpuri district, Uttar Pradesh, India. As of 2011, it had a population of 730, in 113 households.

== Demographics ==
As of 2011, Nagla Bhagat had a population of 730, in 113 households. This population was 54.0% male (394) and 46.0% female (336). The 0-6 age group numbered 125 (62 male and 63 female), or 17.1% of the total population. 216 residents were members of Scheduled Castes, or 30.0% of the total.

The 1981 census recorded Nagla Bhagat as having a population of 498 people, in 82 households.

The 1961 census recorded Nagla Bhagat as comprising 1 hamlet, with a total population of 224 people (115 male and 109 female), in 74 households and 33 physical houses. The area of the village was given as 205 acres.

== Infrastructure ==
As of 2011, Nagla Bhagat had 2 primary schools; it did not have any healthcare facilities. Drinking water was provided by hand pump and tube well/borehole; there were no public toilets. The village had a public library but no post office; there was at least some access to electricity for residential and agricultural purposes. Streets were made of both kachcha and pakka materials.
