= Shah Alampur =

Village in Uttar Pradesh, India

- Village
- Location in Uttar Pradesh, India
- Coordinates: 27.2308°N 79.19261°E
- Country: India
- State: Uttar Pradesh
- District: Mainpuri
- Tehsil: Bhongaon

Area
  - Total: 1.044 km^{2} (0.403 sq mi)

Population (2011)
  - Total: 1,013
  - Density: 970.3/km^{2} (2,513/sq mi)
- Time zone: UTC+5:30 (IST)

Shah Alampur (Śāh Ālampur) is a village in Sultanganj block of Mainpuri district, Uttar Pradesh, India. As of 2011, it had a population of 1,013, in 173 households.

== Demographics ==
As of 2011, Shah Alampur had a population of 1,013, in 173 households. This population was 53.4% male (541) and 46.6% female (472). The 0-6 age group numbered 163 (92 male and 71 female), or 16.1% of the total population. No residents were members of Scheduled Castes.

The 1981 census recorded Shah Alampur as having a population of 602 people, in 113 households.

The 1961 census recorded Shah Alampur as comprising 2 hamlets, with a total population of 488 people (250 male and 238 female), in 94 households and 61 physical houses. The area of the village was given as 259 acres.

== Infrastructure ==
As of 2011, Shah Alampur had 1 primary school; it did not have any healthcare facilities. Drinking water was provided by hand pump and tube well/borehole; there were no public toilets. The village had a post office but no public library; there was at least some access to electricity for all purposes. Streets were made of both kachcha and pakka materials.
