= Jaswantpur =

Village in Uttar Pradesh, India

- Village
- Location in Uttar Pradesh, India
- Coordinates: 27.36498°N 79.08317°E
- Country: India
- State: Uttar Pradesh
- District: Mainpuri
- Tehsil: Bhongaon

Area
  - Total: 0.763 km^{2} (0.295 sq mi)

Population (2011)
  - Total: 649
  - Density: 851/km^{2} (2,200/sq mi)
- Time zone: UTC+5:30 (IST)
- PIN: 205267

Jaswantpur (Jaswantpur) is a village in Sultanganj block of Mainpuri district, Uttar Pradesh, India. As of 2011, it had a population of 649, in 121 households.

== Demographics ==
As of 2011, Jaswantpur had a population of 649, in 121 households. This population was 53.5% male (347) and 46.5% female (302). The 0-6 age group numbered 118 (57 male and 61 female), or 18.2% of the total population. 123 residents were members of Scheduled Castes, or 19.0% of the total.

The 1981 census recorded Jaswantpur as having a population of 349 people, in 60 households.

The 1961 census recorded Jaswantpur as comprising 2 hamlets, with a total population of 370 people (207 male and 163 female), in 43 households and 41 physical houses. The area of the village was given as 190 acres and it was then counted as part of Kuraoli CD block.

== Infrastructure ==
As of 2011, Jaswantpur did not have any schools or healthcare facilities. Drinking water was provided by hand pump and tube well/borehole; there were no public toilets. The village had a post office but no public library; there was at least some access to electricity for all purposes. Streets were made of both kachcha and pakka materials.
