= Ganeshpur, Sultanganj =

Village in Uttar Pradesh, India

Ganeshpur
- Village
- Location in Uttar Pradesh, India
- Coordinates: 27.41328°N 79.09561°E
- Country: India
- State: Uttar Pradesh
- District: Mainpuri
- Tehsil: Bhongaon

Area
  - Total: 1.267 km^{2} (0.489 sq mi)

Population (2011)
  - Total: 921
  - Density: 727/km^{2} (1,880/sq mi)
- Time zone: UTC+5:30 (IST)
- PIN: 205267

Ganeshpur (Ganeśpur) is a village in Sultanganj block of Mainpuri district, Uttar Pradesh, India. As of 2011, it had a population of 921, in 141 households.

== Demographics ==
As of 2011, Ganeshpur had a population of 921, in 141 households. This population was 52.9% male (487) and 47.1% female (434). The 0-6 age group numbered 149 (91 male and 58 female), or 16.2% of the total population. 48 residents were members of Scheduled Castes, or 5.2% of the total.

The 1981 census recorded Ganeshpur as having a population of 417 people, in 72 households.

The 1961 census recorded Ganeshpur as comprising 1 hamlet, with a total population of 267 people (137 male and 130 female), in 43 households and 28 physical houses. The area of the village was given as 311 acres.

== Infrastructure ==
As of 2011, Ganeshpur had 1 primary school; it did not have any healthcare facilities. Drinking water was provided by hand pump and tube well/borehole; there were no public toilets. The village had a post office and public library, as well as at least some access to electricity for all purposes. Streets were made of pakka materials.
