= Burra Chak Sahara =

Village in Uttar Pradesh, India

- Village
- Location in Uttar Pradesh, India
- Coordinates: 27.36996°N 79.15445°E
- Country: India
- State: Uttar Pradesh
- District: Mainpuri
- Tehsil: Bhongaon

Area
  - Total: 1.868 km^{2} (0.721 sq mi)

Population (2011)
  - Total: 1,227
  - Density: 656.9/km^{2} (1,701/sq mi)
- Time zone: UTC+5:30 (IST)

Burra Chak Sahara, also spelled Bura Chak Sahara, is a village in Sultanganj block of Mainpuri district, Uttar Pradesh. As of 2011, it has a population of 1,227, in 208 households.

== Demographics ==
As of 2011, Burra Chak Sahara had a population of 1,227, in 208 households. This population was 50.8% male (623) and 49.2% female (604). The 0-6 age group numbered 220 (95 male and 125 female), or 17.9% of the total population. 143 residents were members of Scheduled Castes, or 11.7% of the total.

The 1981 census recorded Burra Chak Sahara as having a population of 646 people, in 83 households.

The 1961 census recorded Burra Chak Sahara as comprising 1 hamlet, with a total population of 452 people (247 male and 205 female), in 95 households and 45 physical houses. The area of the village was given as 465 acres.

== Infrastructure ==
As of 2011, Burra Chak Sahara had 1 primary school; it did not have any healthcare facilities. Drinking water was provided by hand pump; there were no public toilets. The village had a public library but no post office; there was at least some access to electricity for all purposes. Streets were made of pakka materials.
