= Sahara, Mainpuri =

Village in Uttar Pradesh, India

Sahara
- Village
- Location in Uttar Pradesh, India
- Coordinates: 27.36313°N 79.12074°E
- Country: India
- State: Uttar Pradesh
- District: Mainpuri
- Tehsil: Bhongaon

Area
  - Total: 11.60 km^{2} (4.48 sq mi)

Population (2011)
  - Total: 9,579
  - Density: 825.8/km^{2} (2,139/sq mi)
- Time zone: UTC+5:30 (IST)
- PIN: 205267

Sahara (Sahārā) is a large village in Sultanganj block of Mainpuri district, Uttar Pradesh. As of 2011, it has a population of 9,579, in 1,568 households.

== Geography ==
Sahara is located about 16 km west of Bhongaon, the tehsil headquarters. A minor canal flows through village lands, providing water for irrigation.

== Demographics ==
As of 2011, Sahara had a population of 9,579, in 1,568 households. This population was 52.7% male (5,045) and 47.3% female (4,534). The 0-6 age group numbered 1,569 (831 male and 738 female), or 16.4% of the total population. 700 residents were members of Scheduled Castes, or 7.3% of the total.

The 1981 census recorded Sahara as having a population of 6,139 people, in 1,114 households.

The 1961 census recorded Sahara as comprising 13 hamlets, with a total population of 4,366 people (2,318 male and 2,048 female), in 621 households and 589 physical houses. The area of the village was given as 2,906 acres and it had a post office at that point. It was then counted as part of Kuraoli CD block.

The 1901 census recorded Sahara as comprising 12 sites, with a total population of 2,868, and the village had a school around that time.

== Infrastructure ==
As of 2011, Sahara had 4 primary schools and 1 primary health centre. Drinking water was provided by hand pump; there were no public toilets. The village had a post office and public library, as well as at least some access to electricity for all purposes. Streets were made of both kachcha and pakka materials. Durga Dham in Sahara near the primary school.
