= Balarpur Ramnagar =

Village in Uttar Pradesh, India

- Village
- Location in Uttar Pradesh, India
- Coordinates: 27.3613637°N 79.1632152°E
- Country: India
- State: Uttar Pradesh
- District: Mainpuri
- Tehsil: Bhongaon

Area
  - Total: 3.012 km^{2} (1.163 sq mi)

Population (2011)
  - Total: 1,550
  - Density: 515/km^{2} (1,330/sq mi)
- Time zone: UTC+5:30 (IST)
- PIN: 205267

Balarpur Ramnagar (Balārpur Rāmnagar) is a village in Sultanganj block of Mainpuri district, Uttar Pradesh, India. As of 2011, it had a population of 1,550, in 250 households.

== Demographics ==
As of 2011, Balarpur Ramnagar had a population of 1,550, in 250 households. This population was 51.8% male (803) and 48.2% female (747). The 0-6 age group numbered 246 (124 male and 122 female), or 15.9% of the total population. 281 residents were members of Scheduled Castes, or 18.1% of the total.

The 1981 census recorded Balarpur Ramnagar as having a population of 967 people, in 168 households.

The 1961 census recorded Balarpur Ramnagar as comprising 2 hamlets, with a total population of 689 people (347 male and 342 female), in 125 households and 123 physical houses. The area of the village was given as 711 acres.

== Infrastructure ==
As of 2011, Balarpur Ramnagar had 1 primary school; it did not have any healthcare facilities. Drinking water was provided by hand pump and tube well/borehole; there were no public toilets. The village had a post office and public library, as well as at least some access to electricity for residential and agricultural purposes. Streets were made of both kachcha and pakka materials.
