= Misaura =

Village in Uttar Pradesh, India

- Village
- Location in Uttar Pradesh, India
- Coordinates: 27.26891°N 79.17022°E
- Country: India
- State: Uttar Pradesh
- District: Mainpuri
- Tehsil: Bhongaon

Area
  - Total: 0.854 km^{2} (0.330 sq mi)

Population (2011)
  - Total: 551
  - Density: 645/km^{2} (1,670/sq mi)
- Time zone: UTC+5:30 (IST)

Misaura (Misaurā) is a village in Sultanganj block of Mainpuri district, Uttar Pradesh. As of 2011, it has a population of 551, in 87 households.

== Demographics ==
As of 2011, Misaura had a population of 551, in 87 households. This population was 53.2% male (293) and 46.8% female (258). The 0-6 age group numbered 69 (37 male and 32 female), or 12.5% of the total population. No residents were members of Scheduled Castes.

The 1981 census recorded Misaura as having a population of 367 people, in 66 households.

The 1961 census recorded Misaura as comprising 2 hamlets, with a total population of 271 people (151 male and 120 female), in 63 households and 42 physical houses. The area of the village was given as 157 acres.

== Infrastructure ==
As of 2011, Misaura had 2 primary schools; it did not have any healthcare facilities. Drinking water was provided by hand pump and tube well/borehole; there were no public toilets. The village had a post office but no public library; there was at least some access to electricity for all purposes. Streets were made of both kachcha and pakka materials.
