= Brijpur =

Village in Uttar Pradesh, India

- Village
- Location in Uttar Pradesh, India
- Coordinates: 27.35932°N 79.09302°E
- Country: India
- State: Uttar Pradesh
- District: Mainpuri
- Tehsil: Bhongaon

Area
  - Total: 1.641 km^{2} (0.634 sq mi)

Population (2011)
  - Total: 1,955
  - Density: 1,191/km^{2} (3,086/sq mi)
- Time zone: UTC+5:30 (IST)
- PIN: 205267

Brijpur (Brajpur) is a village in Sultanganj block of Mainpuri district, Uttar Pradesh. As of 2011, it has a population of 1,955, in 351 households.

== Demographics ==
As of 2011, Brijpur had a population of 1,955, in 351 households. This population was 54.0% male (1,055) and 46.0% female (900). The 0-6 age group numbered 343 (180 male and 163 female), or 17.5% of the total population. No residents were members of Scheduled Castes.

The 1981 census recorded Brijpur as having a population of 786 people, in 143 households.

The 1961 census recorded Brijpur as comprising 2 hamlets, with a total population of 526 people (300 male and 226 female), in 94 households and 77 physical houses. The area of the village was given as 414 acres.

== Infrastructure ==
As of 2011, Brijpur had 1 primary school; it did not have any healthcare facilities. Drinking water was provided by hand pump and tube well/borehole; there were no public toilets. The village did not have a post office or public library; there was at least some access to electricity for all purposes. Streets were made of both kachcha and pakka materials.
