= Dalippur Kailai =

Village in Uttar Pradesh, India

- Village
- Location in Uttar Pradesh, India
- Coordinates: 27.37259°N 79.0722°E
- Country: India
- State: Uttar Pradesh
- District: Mainpuri
- Tehsil: Bhongaon

Area
  - Total: 1.419 km^{2} (0.548 sq mi)

Population (2011)
  - Total: 792
  - Density: 558/km^{2} (1,450/sq mi)
- Time zone: UTC+5:30 (IST)
- PIN: 205267

Dalippur Kailai (Dalīppur Kailaī) is a village in Sultanganj block of Mainpuri district, Uttar Pradesh. As of 2011, it has a population of 792, in 156 households.

== Demographics ==
As of 2011, Dalippur Kailai had a population of 792, in 156 households. This population was 54.3% male (430) and 45.7% female (362). The 0-6 age group numbered 135 (66 male and 69 female), or 17.0% of the total population. 216 residents were members of Scheduled Castes, or 27.3% of the total.

The 1981 census recorded Dalippur Kailai as having a population of 635 people, in 120 households.

The 1961 census recorded Dalippur Kailai as comprising 1 hamlet, with a total population of 608 people (334 male and 274 female), in 121 households and 86 physical houses. The area of the village was given as 352 acres.

== Infrastructure ==
As of 2011, Dalippur Kailai had 1 primary school and 1 maternity and child welfare centre. Drinking water was provided by hand pump and tube well/borehole; there were no public toilets. The village had a public library but no post office; there was at least some access to electricity for residential and agricultural purposes. Streets were made of both kachcha and pakka materials.
