= Jaitulpur =

Village in Uttar Pradesh, India

- Village
- Location in Uttar Pradesh, India
- Coordinates: 27.22552°N 79.17328°E
- Country: India
- State: Uttar Pradesh
- District: Mainpuri
- Tehsil: Bhongaon

Area
  - Total: 2.559 km^{2} (0.988 sq mi)

Population (2011)
  - Total: 1,405
  - Density: 549.0/km^{2} (1,422/sq mi)
- Time zone: UTC+5:30 (IST)

Jaitulpur (Jaitūlpur) is a village in Sultanganj block of Mainpuri district, Uttar Pradesh. As of 2011, it has a population of 1,405, in 236 households.

== Demographics ==
As of 2011, Jaitulpur had a population of 1,405, in 236 households. This population was 53.9% male (757) and 46.1% female (648). The 0-6 age group numbered 192 (98 male and 94 female), or 13.7% of the total population. 226 residents were members of Scheduled Castes, or 16.1% of the total.

The 1981 census recorded Jaitulpur as having a population of 854 people, in 128 households.

The 1961 census recorded Jaitulpur as comprising 4 hamlets, with a total population of 622 people (329 male and 293 female), in 111 households and 93 physical houses. The area of the village was given as 628 acres.

== Infrastructure ==
As of 2011, Jaitulpur had 1 primary school; it did not have any healthcare facilities. Drinking water was provided by hand pump and tube well/borehole; there were no public toilets. The village did not have a post office or public library; there was at least some access to electricity for all purposes. Streets were made of both kachcha and pakka materials.
