= Goshalpur =

Village in Uttar Pradesh, India

- Village
- Location in Uttar Pradesh, India
- Coordinates: 27.41027°N 79.10321°E
- Country: India
- State: Uttar Pradesh
- District: Mainpuri
- Tehsil: Bhongaon

Area
  - Total: 1.35 km^{2} (0.52 sq mi)

Population (2011)
  - Total: 732
  - Density: 542/km^{2} (1,400/sq mi)
- Time zone: UTC+5:30 (IST)
- PIN: 205267

Goshalpur (Gośalpur) is a village in Sultanganj block of Mainpuri district, Uttar Pradesh, India. As of 2011, it had a population of 732, in 121 households.

== Demographics ==
As of 2011, Goshalpur had a population of 732, in 121 households. This population was 51.9% male (380) and 48.1% female (352). The 0-6 age group numbered 96 (46 male and 50 female), or 13.1% of the total population. 66 residents were members of Scheduled Castes, or 9.0% of the total.

The 1981 census recorded Goshalpur as having a population of 300 people, in 74 households.

The 1961 census recorded Goshalpur as comprising 1 hamlet, with a total population of 333 people (175 male and 158 female), in 76 households and 74 physical houses. The area of the village was given as 134 acres.

== Infrastructure ==
As of 2011, Goshalpur had 1 primary school; it did not have any healthcare facilities. Drinking water was provided by well, hand pump, and tube well/borehole; there were no public toilets. The village had a post office and public library, as well as at least some access to electricity for all purposes. Streets were made of both kachcha and pakka materials.
