= Sirauliya =

Village in Uttar Pradesh, India

- Village
- Location in Uttar Pradesh, India
- Coordinates: 27.23587°N 78.87543°E
- Country: India
- State: Uttar Pradesh
- District: Mainpuri
- Tehsil: Mainpuri

Area
  - Total: 2.75 km^{2} (1.06 sq mi)

Population (2011)
  - Total: 1,170
  - Density: 425/km^{2} (1,100/sq mi)
- Time zone: UTC+5:30 (IST)
- PIN: 205001

Sirauliya (Sirauliyā or Siroliyā), is a village in Mainpuri block of Mainpuri district, Uttar Pradesh, India. As of 2011, it had a population of 1,170, in 275 households.

== Demographics ==
As of 2011, Sirauliya had a population of 1,170, in 275 households. This population was 54.0% male (643) and 45.0% female (527). The 0-6 age group numbered 183 (87 male and 96 female), or 15.6% of the total population. 371 residents were members of Scheduled Castes, or 31.7% of the total.

The 1981 census recorded Sirauliya as having a population of 717 people, in 138 households.

The 1961 census recorded Sirauliya as comprising 2 hamlets, with a total population of 459 people (246 male and 213 female), in 82 households and 55 physical houses. The area of the village was given as 674 acres.

== Infrastructure ==
As of 2011, Sirauliya had 1 primary school; it did not have any healthcare facilities. Drinking water was provided by well, hand pump, and tube well; there were no public toilets. The village did not have a post office or public library; there was at least some access to electricity for all purposes. Streets were made of both kachcha and pakka materials.
