= Husainpur, Sultanganj =

Village in Uttar Pradesh, India

Husainpur
- Village
- Location in Uttar Pradesh, India
- Coordinates: 27.3351986°N 79.1961952°E
- Country: India
- State: Uttar Pradesh
- District: Mainpuri
- Tehsil: Bhongaon

Area
  - Total: 0.945 km^{2} (0.365 sq mi)

Population (2011)
  - Total: 650
  - Density: 690/km^{2} (1,800/sq mi)
- Time zone: UTC+5:30 (IST)

Husainpur is a village in Sultanganj block of Mainpuri district, Uttar Pradesh. As of 2011, it had a population of 650, in 113 households.

== Demographics ==
As of 2011, Husainpur had a population of 650, in 113 households. This population was 54.2% male (352) and 45.8% female (298). The 0-6 age group numbered 99 (50 male and 49 female), or 15.2% of the total population. No residents were members of Scheduled Castes.

The 1981 census recorded Husainpur as having a population of 422 people, in 83 households.

The 1961 census recorded Husainpur (as "Husenpur") as comprising 2 hamlets, with a total population of 321 people (176 male and 145 female), in 67 households and 44 physical houses. The area of the village was given as 232 acres.

== Infrastructure ==
As of 2011, Husainpur had 1 primary school; it did not have any healthcare facilities. Drinking water was provided by hand pump and tube well/post office; there were no public toilets. The village had a post office but no public library; there was at least some access to electricity for residential and agricultural purposes. Streets were made of both kachcha and pakka materials.
