= Jagatpur, Sultanganj =

Village in Uttar Pradesh, India

Jagatpur
- Village
- Location in Uttar Pradesh, India
- Coordinates: 27.35547°N 79.15675°E
- Country: India
- State: Uttar Pradesh
- District: Mainpuri
- Tehsil: Bhongaon

Area
  - Total: 4.926 km^{2} (1.902 sq mi)

Population (2011)
  - Total: 3,181
  - Density: 645.8/km^{2} (1,673/sq mi)
- Time zone: UTC+5:30 (IST)
- PIN: 205267

Jagatpur (Jagatpur) is a village in Sultanganj block of Mainpuri district, Uttar Pradesh. As of 2011, it has a population of 3,181, in 553 households.

== Demographics ==
As of 2011, Jagatpur had a population of 3,181, in 553 households. This population was 53.3% male (1,696) and 46.7% female (1,485). The 0-6 age group numbered 470 (239 male and 231 female), or 14.8% of the total population. 146 residents were members of Scheduled Castes, or 4.6% of the total.

The 1981 census recorded Jagatpur as having a population of 2,202 people, in 398 households.

The 1961 census recorded Jagatpur as comprising 4 hamlets, with a total population of 1,574 people (831 male and 743 female), in 278 households and 221 physical houses. The village area was given as 1,122 acres.

== Infrastructure ==
As of 2011, Jagatpur had 2 primary schools; it did not have any healthcare facilities. Drinking water was provided by hand pump and tube well/borehole; there were no public toilets. The village had a post office and public library, as well as at least some access to electricity for residential and agricultural purposes. Streets were made of both kachcha and pakka materials.
