= Narsinghpur, Mainpuri =

Village in Uttar Pradesh, India

Narsinghpur
- Village
- Location in Uttar Pradesh, India
- Coordinates: 27.24427°N 79.19362°E
- Country: India
- State: Uttar Pradesh
- District: Mainpuri
- Tehsil: Bhongaon

Area
  - Total: 1.302 km^{2} (0.503 sq mi)

Population (2011)
  - Total: 780
  - Density: 600/km^{2} (1,600/sq mi)
- Time zone: UTC+5:30 (IST)

Narsinghpur (Narsiṅghpur) is a village in Sultanganj block of Mainpuri district, Uttar Pradesh, India. As of 2011, it had a population of 780, in 146 households.

== Demographics ==
As of 2011, Narsinghpur had a population of 780, in 146 households. This population was 51.0% male (398) and 49.0% female (382). The 0-6 age group numbered 145 (73 male and 72 female), or 18.6% of the total population. 41 residents were members of Scheduled Castes, or 5.3% of the total.

The 1981 census recorded Narsinghpur as having a population of 381 people, in 75 households.

The 1961 census recorded Narsinghpur as comprising 2 hamlets, with a total population of 289 people (159 male and 130 female), in 58 households and 55 physical houses. The area of the village was given as 257 acres.

== Infrastructure ==
As of 2011, Narsinghpur had 1 primary school; it did not have any healthcare facilities. Drinking water was provided by hand pump; there were no public toilets. The village had a post office but no public library; there was at least some access to electricity for all purposes. Streets were made of both kachcha and pakka materials.
