= Burra, Mainpuri =

Village in Uttar Pradesh, India

Burra
- Village
- Location in Uttar Pradesh, India
- Coordinates: 27.27634°N 78.99337°E
- Country: India
- State: Uttar Pradesh
- District: Mainpuri
- Tehsil: Mainpuri

Area
  - Total: 3.252 km^{2} (1.256 sq mi)

Population (2011)
  - Total: 1,756
  - Density: 540.0/km^{2} (1,399/sq mi)
- Time zone: UTC+5:30 (IST)

Burra (Burrā) is a village in Mainpuri block of Mainpuri district, Uttar Pradesh, India. As of 2011, it had a population of 1,756, in 309 households.

== Demographics ==
As of 2011, Burra had a population of 1,756, in 309 households. This population was 54.4% male (956) and 45.6% female (800). The 0-6 age group numbered 278 (163 male and 115 female), or 15.8% of the total population. 244 residents were members of Scheduled Castes, or 13.9% of the total.

The 1981 census recorded Burra as having a population of 778 people, in 137 households.

The 1961 census recorded Burra as comprising 1 hamlet, with a total population of 600 people (308 male and 292 female), in 123 households and 78 physical houses. The area of the village was given as 792 acres.

== Infrastructure ==
As of 2011, Burra had 1 primary school; it did not have any healthcare facilities. Drinking water was provided by hand pump and tube well; there were no public toilets. The village had a public library but no post office; there was at least some access to electricity for all purposes. Streets were made of both kachcha and pakka materials.
