= Lahra Mahuan =

Village in Uttar Pradesh, India

- Village
- Location in Uttar Pradesh, India
- Coordinates: 27.25304°N 79.00575°E
- Country: India
- State: Uttar Pradesh
- District: Mainpuri
- Tehsil: Mainpuri

Area
  - Total: 2.894 km^{2} (1.117 sq mi)

Population (2011)
  - Total: 3,187
  - Density: 1,101/km^{2} (2,852/sq mi)
- Time zone: UTC+5:30 (IST)
- PIN: 205001

Lahra Mahuan (Lāhrā Mahuān) is a village in Mainpuri block of Mainpuri district, Uttar Pradesh, India. As of 2011, it had a population of 3,187, in 536 households.

== Demographics ==
As of 2011, Lahra Mahuan had a population of 3,187, in 536 households. This population was 54.5% male (1,736) and 45.5% female (1,451). The 0-6 age group numbered 463 (233 male and 230 female), or 14.5% of the total population. 1,731 residents were members of Scheduled Castes, or 54.3% of the total.

The 1981 census recorded Lahra Mahuan (as "Lahra Mauwan") as having a population of 1,537 people, in 289 households.

The 1961 census recorded Lahra Mahuan (as "Lehra Mauwan") as comprising 4 hamlets, with a total population of 930 people (524 male and 406 female), in 181 households and 173 physical houses. The area of the village was given as 766 acres.

== Infrastructure ==
As of 2011, Lahra Mahuan had 1 primary school; it did not have any healthcare facilities. Drinking water was provided by tap, hand pump, and tube well; there were no public toilets. The village had a post office but no public library; there was at least some access to electricity for all purposes. Streets were made of both kachcha and pakka materials.
