= Simrai =

Village in Uttar Pradesh, India

- Village
- Location in Uttar Pradesh, India
- Coordinates: 27.37828°N 79.09636°E
- Country: India
- State: Uttar Pradesh
- District: Mainpuri
- Tehsil: Bhongaon

Area
  - Total: 7.486 km^{2} (2.890 sq mi)

Population (2011)
  - Total: 5,249
  - Density: 701.2/km^{2} (1,816/sq mi)
- Time zone: UTC+5:30 (IST)
- PIN: 205267

Simrai (Simraī) is a village in Sultanganj block of Mainpuri district, Uttar Pradesh, India. As of 2011, it had a population of 5,249, in 883 households.

== Demographics ==
As of 2011, Simrai had a population of 5,249, in 883 households. This population was 53.7% male (2,818) and 46.3% female (2,431). The 0-6 age group numbered 827 (450 male and 377 female), or 15.8% of the total population. 946 residents were members of Scheduled Castes, or 18.9% of the total.

The 1981 census recorded Simrai as having a population of 3,600 people, in 636 households.

The 1961 census recorded Simrai as comprising 10 hamlets, with a total population of 2,736 people (1,483 male and 1,253 female), in 496 households and 369 physical houses. The area of the village was given as 1,863 acres and it had a post office at that point. It was then counted as part of Kuraoli CD block.

== Infrastructure ==
As of 2011, Simrai had 1 primary school and 1 veterinary hospital but no healthcare facilities for humans. Drinking water was provided by hand pump and tube well/borehole; there were no public toilets. The village had a post office but no public library; there was at least some access to electricity for all purposes. Streets were made of both kachcha and pakka materials.
