= Danchaura =

Village in Uttar Pradesh, India

- Village
- Location in Uttar Pradesh, India
- Coordinates: 27.31659°N 79.22782°E
- Country: India
- State: Uttar Pradesh
- District: Mainpuri
- Tehsil: Bhongaon

Area
  - Total: 1.771 km^{2} (0.684 sq mi)

Population (2011)
  - Total: 574
  - Density: 324/km^{2} (839/sq mi)
- Time zone: UTC+5:30 (IST)
- PIN: 205262

Danchaura (Danchaurā) is a village in Sultanganj block of Mainpuri district, Uttar Pradesh, India. As of 2011, it had a population of 574, in 103 households.

== Demographics ==
As of 2011, Danchaura had a population of 574, in 103 households. This population was 56.6% male (325) and 43.4% female (249). The 0-6 age group numbered 88 (51 male and 37 female), or 15.3% of the total population. 91 residents were members of Scheduled Castes, or 15.9% of the total.

The 1981 census recorded Danchaura as having a population of 374 people, in 62 households.

The 1961 census recorded Danchaura as comprising 2 hamlets, with a total population of 438 people (237 male and 201 female), in 82 households and 65 physical houses. The area of the village was given as 438 acres, and it was then counted as part of Bewar CD block. There are 8 government servants 3 servants in the army and 1 is Principal in Govt Degree College (Professor Subhash Verma), 1 Class 2 officer ADCO in Cooperative (Mr. B.L. verma), 1 Commercial pilot (Sachin Verma) and 1 managing Director in Cooperative Society (Dharmendra Verma). 1 is head master in basic school the name of head master is MR. MIJAJI LAL

== Infrastructure ==
As of 2011, Danchaura did not have any schools or healthcare facilities. Drinking water was provided by hand pump and tube well/borehole; there were no public toilets. The village don't have post office and public library; there was at least some access to electricity for all purposes. Streets were made of kachcha materials.
