= Dudhauna =

Village in Uttar Pradesh, India

- Village
- Location in Uttar Pradesh, India
- Coordinates: 27.35452°N 79.1479°E
- Country: India
- State: Uttar Pradesh
- District: Mainpuri
- Tehsil: Bhongaon

Area
  - Total: 1.118 km^{2} (0.432 sq mi)

Population (2011)
  - Total: 1,083
  - Density: 968.7/km^{2} (2,509/sq mi)
- Time zone: UTC+5:30 (IST)
- PIN: 205267

Dudhauna (Dudhonā) is a village in Sultanganj block of Mainpuri district, Uttar Pradesh. As of 2011, it had a population of 1,083, in 172 households.

== Demographics ==
As of 2011, Dudhauna had a population of 1,083, in 172 households. This population was 52.6% male (570) and 47.4% female (513). The 0-6 age group numbered 153 (76 male and 77 female), or 14.1% of the total population. 132 residents were members of Scheduled Castes, or 12.2% of the total.

The 1981 census recorded Dudhauna as having a population of 762 people, in 132 households.

The 1961 census recorded Dudhauna as comprising 1 hamlet, with a total population of 529 people (300 male and 229 female), in 104 households and 89 physical houses. The area of the village was given as 296 acres.

== Infrastructure ==
As of 2011, Dudhauna had 1 primary school; it did not have any healthcare facilities. Drinking water was provided by hand pump and tube well; there were no public toilets. The village had a post office and public library, as well as at least some access to electricity for all purposes. Streets were made of both kachcha and pakka materials.
