= Hannu Khera =

Village in Uttar Pradesh, India

- Village
- Location in Uttar Pradesh, India
- Coordinates: 27.40101°N 79.12051°E
- Country: India
- State: Uttar Pradesh
- District: Mainpuri
- Tehsil: Bhongaon

Area
  - Total: 3.405 km^{2} (1.315 sq mi)

Population (2011)
  - Total: 2,791
  - Density: 819.7/km^{2} (2,123/sq mi)
- Time zone: UTC+5:30 (IST)

Hannu Khera (Hannū Kheṛā, also written as one word, Hannūkheṛā), is a village in Sultanganj block of Mainpuri district, Uttar Pradesh. As of 2011, it had a population of 2,791, in 427 households.

== Demographics ==
As of 2011, Hannu Khera had a population of 2,791, in 427 households. This population was 53.6% male (1,495) and 46.4% female (1,296). The 0-6 age group numbered 491 (263 male and 228 female), or 17.6% of the total population. 564 residents were members of Scheduled Castes, or 20.2% of the total.

The 1981 census recorded Hannu Khera as having a population of 1,553 people, in 276 households.

The 1961 census recorded Hannu Khera as comprising 5 hamlets, with a total population of 1,127 people (647 male and 480 female), in 208 households and 185 physical houses. The area of the village was given as 848 acres.

== Infrastructure ==
As of 2011, Hannu Khera had 3 primary schools; it did not have any healthcare facilities. Drinking water was provided by hand pump and tube well/borehole; there were no public toilets. The village had a post office and public library, as well as at least some access to electricity for all purposes. Streets were made of both kachcha and pakka materials.
