= Jaramai, Mainpuri =

Village in Uttar Pradesh, India

Jaramai
- Village
- Location in Uttar Pradesh, India
- Coordinates: 27.22161°N 78.96162°E
- Country: India
- State: Uttar Pradesh
- District: Mainpuri
- Tehsil: Mainpuri

Area
  - Total: 3.596 km^{2} (1.388 sq mi)

Population (2011)
  - Total: 2,593
  - Density: 721.1/km^{2} (1,868/sq mi)
- Time zone: UTC+5:30 (IST)

Jaramai (Jarāmaī), also written Jara Mai, is a village in Mainpuri block of Mainpuri district, Uttar Pradesh, India. As of 2011, it had a population of 2,593, in 442 households.

== Demographics ==
As of 2011, Jaramai had a population of 2,593, in 442 households. This population was 52.3% male (1,357) and 47.7% female (1,236). The 0-6 age group numbered 430 (225 male and 205 female), or 16.6% of the total population. 880 residents were members of Scheduled Castes, or 33.9% of the total.

The 1981 census recorded Jaramai as having a population of 1,127 people, in 183 households.

The 1961 census recorded Jaramai as comprising 4 hamlets, with a total population of 755 people (405 male and 350 female), in 133 households and 115 physical houses. The area of the village was given as 891 acres.

== Infrastructure ==
As of 2011, Jaramai had 2 primary schools; it did not have any healthcare facilities. Drinking water was provided by well, hand pump, and tube well/borehole; there were no public toilets. The village had a post office and public library, as well as at least some access to electricity for residential and agricultural purposes. Streets were made of both kachcha and pakka materials.
