= Naka, Mainpuri =

Village in Uttar Pradesh, India

Naka
- Village
- Location in Uttar Pradesh, India
- Coordinates: 27.32192°N 79.14392°E
- Country: India
- State: Uttar Pradesh
- District: Mainpuri
- Tehsil: Bhongaon

Area
  - Total: 1.628 km^{2} (0.629 sq mi)

Population (2011)
  - Total: 1,644
  - Density: 1,010/km^{2} (2,615/sq mi)
- Time zone: UTC+5:30 (IST)
- PIN: 205262

Naka (Nākā) is a village in Sultanganj block of Mainpuri district, Uttar Pradesh. As of 2011, it had a population of 1,644, in 265 households.

== Demographics ==
As of 2011, Naka had a population of 1,644, in 265 households. This population was 52.6% male (864) and 47.4% female (780). The 0-6 age group numbered 243 (131 male and 112 female), or 14.8% of the total population. 35 residents were members of Scheduled Castes, or 2.1% of the total.

The 1981 census recorded Naka as having a population of 904 people, in 155 households.

The 1961 census recorded Naka as comprising 1 hamlet, with a total population of 448 people (315 male and 133 female), in 113 households and 97 physical houses. The area of the village was given as 408 acres.

== Infrastructure ==
As of 2011, Naka had 1 primary school; it did not have any healthcare facilities. Drinking water was provided by hand pump; there were no public toilets. The village had a post office and public library, as well as at least some access to electricity for residential and agricultural purposes. Streets were made of pakka materials.
