= Ahirwa =

Village in Uttar Pradesh, India

- Village
- Location in Uttar Pradesh, India
- Coordinates: 27.26779°N 79.09317°E
- Country: India
- State: Uttar Pradesh
- District: Mainpuri
- Tehsil: Bhongaon

Area
  - Total: 12.055 km^{2} (4.654 sq mi)

Population (2011)
  - Total: 7,828
  - Density: 649.4/km^{2} (1,682/sq mi)
- Time zone: UTC+5:30 (IST)

Ahirwa (Ahirwā) is a village in Sultanganj block of Mainpuri district, Uttar Pradesh. As of 2011, it had a population of 7,828, in 1,232 households.

== Demographics ==
As of 2011, Ahirwa had a population of 7,828, in 1,232 households. This population was 53.2% male (4,162) and 46.8% female (3,666). The 0-6 age group numbered 1,257 (657 male and 600 female), or 16.1% of the total population. 1,505 residents were members of Scheduled Castes, or 19.2% of the total.

The 1981 census recorded Ahirwa as having a population of 4,089 people, in 696 households.

The 1961 census recorded Ahirwa as comprising 7 hamlets, with a total population of 2,720 people (1,467 male and 1,253 female), in 506 households and 371 physical houses. The area of the village was given as 3,014 acres.

== Infrastructure ==
As of 2011, Ahirwa had 2 primary schools; it did not have any healthcare facilities. Drinking water was provided by hand pump; there were no public toilets. The village had a post office but no public library; there was at least some access to electricity for all purposes. Streets were made of both kachcha and pakka materials.
