= Tolakpur =

Village in Uttar Pradesh, India

- Village
- Location in Uttar Pradesh, India
- Coordinates: 27.22365°N 79.19004°E
- Country: India
- State: Uttar Pradesh
- District: Mainpuri
- Tehsil: Bhongaon

Area
  - Total: 0.79 km^{2} (0.31 sq mi)

Population (2011)
  - Total: 780
  - Density: 990/km^{2} (2,600/sq mi)
- Time zone: UTC+5:30 (IST)

Tolakpur (Tolakpur) is a village in Sultanganj block of Mainpuri district, Uttar Pradesh. As of 2011, it has a population of 780, in 129 households.

== Demographics ==
As of 2011, Tolakpur had a population of 780, in 129 households. This population was 53.5% male (417) and 46.5% female (363). The 0-6 age group numbered 105 (64 male and 41 female), or 13.5% of the total population. 26 residents were members of Scheduled Castes, or 3.3% of the total.

The 1981 census recorded Tolakpur as having a population of 387 people, in 52 households.

The 1961 census recorded Tolakpur as comprising 4 hamlets, with a total population of 232 people (139 male and 93 female), in 37 households and 25 physical houses. The area of the village was given as 198 acres.

== Infrastructure ==
As of 2011, Tolakpur had 1 primary school; it did not have any healthcare facilities. Drinking water was provided by tap, hand pump, and tube well/borehole; there were no public toilets. The village had a post office and public library, as well as at least some access to electricity for all purposes. Streets were made of kachcha materials.
