= Rathera =

Village in Uttar Pradesh, India

- Village
- Location in Uttar Pradesh, India
- Coordinates: 27.1746°N 78.9139°E
- Country: India
- State: Uttar Pradesh
- District: Mainpuri
- Tehsil: Mainpuri

Area
  - Total: 1.414 km^{2} (0.546 sq mi)

Population (2011)
  - Total: 4,856
  - Density: 3,434/km^{2} (8,895/sq mi)
- Time zone: UTC+5:30 (IST)

Rathera (Raṭherā) is a village in Mainpuri block of Mainpuri district, Uttar Pradesh, India. As of 2011, it had a population of 4,856, in 749 households.

== Demographics ==
As of 2011, Rathera had a population of 4,856, in 749 households. This population was 53.3% male (2,588) and 46.7% female (2,268). The 0-6 age group numbered 691 (345 male and 346 female), or 14.2% of the total population. 138 residents were members of Scheduled Castes, or 2.8% of the total.

The 1981 census recorded Rathera as having a population of 2,851 people, in 453 households.

The 1961 census recorded Rathera as comprising 1 hamlet, with a total population of 1,750 people (965 male and 785 female), in 296 households and 200 physical houses. The area of the village was given as 368 acres.

== Infrastructure ==
As of 2011, Rathera had 1 school teaching at the primary level and 3 schools teaching at the secondary level. The village had a veterinary hospital, although there were not any healthcare facilities for humans. Drinking water was provided by well, hand pump, and tube well; there were no public toilets. The village had a post office and public library; as well as at least some access to electricity for all purposes. Streets were made of both kachcha and pakka materials.
