= Katka, Mainpuri =

Village in Uttar Pradesh, India

Katka
- Village
- Location in Uttar Pradesh, India
- Coordinates: 27.37041°N 79.16026°E
- Country: India
- State: Uttar Pradesh
- District: Mainpuri
- Tehsil: Bhongaon

Area
  - Total: 1.088 km^{2} (0.420 sq mi)

Population (2011)
  - Total: 339
  - Density: 312/km^{2} (807/sq mi)
- Time zone: UTC+5:30 (IST)
- PIN: 205267

Katka (Kaṭkā) is a village in Sultanganj block of Mainpuri district, Uttar Pradesh. As of 2011, it has a population of 339, in 53 households.

== Demographics ==
As of 2011, Katka had a population of 339, in 53 households. This population was 50.4% male (171) and 49.6% female (168). The 0-6 age group numbered 53 (24 male and 29 female), or 15.6% of the total population. No residents were members of Scheduled Castes.

The 1981 census recorded Katka as having a population of 177 people, in 27 households.

The 1961 census recorded Katka as comprising 1 hamlet, with a total population of 123 people (64 male and 59 female), in 22 households and 15 physical houses. The area of the village was given as 264 acres.

== Infrastructure ==
As of 2011, Katka did not have any schools or healthcare facilities. Drinking water was provided by tap, hand pump, and tube well/borehole; there were no public toilets. The village had a post office but no public library; there was at least some access to electricity for residential and agricultural purposes. Streets were made of both kachcha and pakka materials.
