= Bilon =

Village in Uttar Pradesh, India

- Village
- Location in Uttar Pradesh, India
- Coordinates: 27.31868°N 79.11027°E
- Country: India
- State: Uttar Pradesh
- District: Mainpuri
- Tehsil: Bhongaon

Area
  - Total: 8.192 km^{2} (3.163 sq mi)

Population (2011)
  - Total: 3,281
  - Density: 400.5/km^{2} (1,037/sq mi)
- Time zone: UTC+5:30 (IST)

Bilon (Bīlon) is a village in Sultanganj block of Mainpuri district, Uttar Pradesh. As of 2011, it has a population of 3,281, in 229 households.

== Geography ==
There is a prominent jhil at Bilon.

== Demographics ==
As of 2011, Bilon had a population of 3,281, in 229 households. This population was 53.6% male (1,758) and 46.4% female (1,523). The 0-6 age group numbered 560 (283 male and 277 female), or 17.1% of the total population. 1,238 residents were members of Scheduled Castes, or 37.7% of the total.

The 1981 census recorded Bilon as having a population of 1,690 people, in 328 households.

The 1961 census recorded Bilon as comprising 3 hamlets, with a total population of 1,267 people (656 male and 611 female), in 262 households and 231 physical houses. The area of the village was given as 2,056 acres.

== Infrastructure ==
As of 2011, Bilon had 1 primary school; it did not have any healthcare facilities. Drinking water was provided by hand pump, and tube well/borehole; there were no public toilets. The village had a post office but no public library; there was at least some access to electricity for all purposes. Streets were made of both kachcha and pakka materials.
