= Itauri =

Village in Uttar Pradesh, India

- Village
- Location in Uttar Pradesh, India
- Coordinates: 27.21748°N 79.09032°E
- Country: India
- State: Uttar Pradesh
- District: Mainpuri
- Tehsil: Bhongaon

Area
  - Total: 2.482 km^{2} (0.958 sq mi)

Population (2011)
  - Total: 2,349
  - Density: 946.4/km^{2} (2,451/sq mi)
- Time zone: UTC+5:30 (IST)

Itauri (Iṭaurī) is a village in Sultanganj block of Mainpuri district, Uttar Pradesh. As of 2011, it has a population of 2,349, in 376 households.

== Demographics ==
As of 2011, Itauri had a population of 2,349, in 376 households. This population was 53.3% male (1,253) and 46.7% female (1,096). The 0-6 age group numbered 399 (206 male and 193 female), or 17.0% of the total population. 614 residents were members of Scheduled Castes, or 26.1% of the total.

The 1981 census recorded Itauri as having a population of 1,113 people, in 178 households.

The 1961 census recorded Itauri (as "Itaura") as comprising 3 hamlets, with a total population of 636 people (342 male and 294 female), in 123 households and 95 physical houses. The area of the village was given as 614 acres.

== Infrastructure ==
As of 2011, Itauri had 1 primary school and 1 maternity and child welfare centre and TB clinic. Drinking water was provided by hand pump and tube well/borehole; there were no public toilets. The village had a post office but no public library; there was at least some access to electricity for all purposes. Streets were made of both kachcha and pakka materials.
