= Harganpur =

Village in Uttar Pradesh, India

- Village
- Location in Uttar Pradesh, India
- Coordinates: 27.31253°N 79.21359°E
- Country: India
- State: Uttar Pradesh
- District: Mainpuri
- Tehsil: Bhongaon

Area
  - Total: 1.17 km^{2} (0.45 sq mi)

Population (2011)
  - Total: 1,035
  - Density: 885/km^{2} (2,290/sq mi)
- Time zone: UTC+5:30 (IST)
- PIN: 205267

Harganpur is a village in Sultanganj block of Mainpuri district, Uttar Pradesh, India. As of 2011, it had a population of 1,035, in 181 households.

== Demographics ==
As of 2011, Harganpur had a population of 1,035, in 181 households. This population was 51.8% male (536) and 48.2% female (499). The 0-6 age group numbered 188 (93 male and 95 female), or 18.2% of the total population. 47 residents were members of Scheduled Castes, or 4.5% of the total.

The 1981 census recorded Harganpur as having a population of 612 people, in 100 households.

The 1961 census recorded Harganpur as comprising 2 hamlets, with a total population of 382 people (206 male and 176 female), in 80 households and 76 physical houses. The area of the village was given as 279 acres.

== Infrastructure ==
As of 2011, Harganpur had 1 primary school; it did not have any healthcare facilities. Drinking water was provided by hand pump and tube well/borehole; there were no public toilets. The village had a post office but no public library; there was at least some access to electricity for residential and agricultural purposes. Streets were made of both kachcha and pakka materials.
