= Rajwana =

Village in Uttar Pradesh, India

- Village
- Location in Uttar Pradesh, India
- Coordinates: 27.29312°N 79.20132°E
- Country: India
- State: Uttar Pradesh
- District: Mainpuri
- Tehsil: Bhongaon

Area
  - Total: 2.092 km^{2} (0.808 sq mi)

Population (2011)
  - Total: 2,745
  - Density: 1,312/km^{2} (3,398/sq mi)
- Time zone: UTC+5:30 (IST)

Rajwana (Rajwānā) is a village in Sultanganj block of Mainpuri district, Uttar Pradesh. As of 2011, it has a population of 2,745, in 455 households.

== Demographics ==
As of 2011, Rajwana had a population of 2,745, in 455 households. This population was 52.7% male (1,447) and 47.3% female (1,298). The 0-6 age group numbered 519 (273 male and 246 female), or 18.9% of the total population. 563 residents were members of Scheduled Castes, or 20.5% of the total.

The 1981 census recorded Rajwana as having a population of 1,521 people, in 271 households.

The 1961 census recorded Rajwana as comprising 4 hamlets, with a total population of 1,108 people (585 male and 523 female), in 208 households and 169 physical houses. The area of the village was given as 614 acres and it had a post office at that point.

== Infrastructure ==
As of 2011, Rajwana had 1 primary school; it did not have any healthcare facilities. Drinking water was provided by hand pump; there was at least one public toilet. The village had a post office and public library, as well as at least some access to electricity for all purposes. Streets were made of both kachcha and pakka materials.
