= Hamirpur, Mainpuri =

Village in Uttar Pradesh, India

Hamirpur
- Village
- Location in Uttar Pradesh, India
- Coordinates: 27.32229°N 79.21613°E
- Country: India
- State: Uttar Pradesh
- District: Mainpuri
- Tehsil: Bhongaon

Area
  - Total: 1.087 km^{2} (0.420 sq mi)

Population (2011)
  - Total: 581
  - Density: 534/km^{2} (1,380/sq mi)
- Time zone: UTC+5:30 (IST)

Hamirpur (Hamīrpur) is a village in Sultanganj block of Mainpuri district, Uttar Pradesh. As of 2011, it has a population of 581, in 96 households.

== Demographics ==
As of 2011, Hamirpur had a population of 581, in 96 households. This population was 50.9% male (296) and 49.1% female (285). The 0-6 age group numbered 135 (64 male and 72 female), or 23.2% of the total population. 129 residents were members of Scheduled Castes, or 22.2% of the total.

The 1981 census recorded Hamirpur as having a population of 398 people, in 71 households.

The 1961 census recorded Hamirpur as comprising 2 hamlets, with a total population of 217 people (116 male and 101 female), in 49 households and 44 physical houses. The area of the village was given as 272 acres.

== Infrastructure ==
As of 2011, Hamirpur did not have any schools or healthcare facilities. Drinking water was provided by hand pump and tube well/borehole; there were no public toilets. The village had a post office but no public library; there was at least some access to electricity for all purposes. Streets were made of kachcha materials.
