= Gaderi =

Village in Uttar Pradesh, India

- Village
- Location in Uttar Pradesh, India
- Coordinates: 27.25524°N 78.984°E
- Country: India
- State: Uttar Pradesh
- District: Mainpuri
- Tehsil: Mainpuri

Area
  - Total: 7.853 km^{2} (3.032 sq mi)

Population (2011)
  - Total: 3,690
  - Density: 470/km^{2} (1,220/sq mi)
- Time zone: UTC+5:30 (IST)
- PIN: 205263

Gaderi (Gaḍerī) is a village in Mainpuri block of Mainpuri district, Uttar Pradesh. As of 2011, it has a population of 3,690, in 620 households.

== Demographics ==
As of 2011, Gaderi had a population of 3,690, in 620 households. This population was 53.4% male (1,971) and 46.6% female (1,719). The 0-6 age group numbered 522 (276 male and 246 female), or 14.1% of the total population. 938 residents were members of Scheduled Castes, or 25.4% of the total.

The 1981 census recorded Gaderi as having a population of 1,834 people, in 318 households.

The 1961 census recorded Gaderi as comprising 5 hamlets, with a total population of 1,261 people (692 male and 569 female), in 223 households and 167 physical houses. The area of the village was given as 1,924 acres.

== Infrastructure ==
As of 2011, Gaderi had 1 primary school; it did not have any healthcare facilities. Drinking water was provided by hand pump and tube well/borehole; there were no public toilets. The village had a post office but no public library; there was at least some access to electricity for all purposes. Streets were made of both kachcha and pakka materials.
