= Shahpura, Mainpuri =

Village in Uttar Pradesh, India

Shahpura
- Village
- Location in Uttar Pradesh, India
- Coordinates: 27.41911°N 79.08107°E
- Country: India
- State: Uttar Pradesh
- District: Mainpuri
- Tehsil: Bhongaon

Area
  - Total: 0.925 km^{2} (0.357 sq mi)

Population (2011)
  - Total: 652
  - Density: 705/km^{2} (1,830/sq mi)
- Time zone: UTC+5:30 (IST)
- PIN: 205267

Shahpura (Shāhpurā) is a village in Sultanganj block of Mainpuri district, Uttar Pradesh. As of 2011, it has a population of 652, in 102 households.

== Demographics ==
As of 2011, Shahpura had a population of 652, in 102 households. This population was 54.8% male (357) and 45.2% female (295). The 0-6 age group numbered 107 (60 male and 47 female), or 16.4% of the total population. 67 residents were members of Scheduled Castes, or 10.3% of the total.

The 1981 census recorded Shahpura as having a population of 365 people, in 54 households.

The 1961 census recorded Shahpura as comprising 1 hamlet, with a total population of 239 people (138 male and 101 female), in 46 households and 33 physical houses. The area of the village was given as 229 acres.

== Infrastructure ==
As of 2011, Shahpura had 1 middle school (but none teaching at the primary or secondary level); it did not have any healthcare facilities. Drinking water was provided by hand pump and tube well/borehole; there were no public toilets. The village did not have a post office or public library; there was at least some access to electricity for all purposes. Streets were made of both kachcha and pakka materials.
