= Nagla Mitkar =

Village in Uttar Pradesh, India

- Village
- Location in Uttar Pradesh, India
- Coordinates: 27.3997°N 79.08308°E
- Country: India
- State: Uttar Pradesh
- District: Mainpuri
- Tehsil: Bhongaon

Area
  - Total: 2.534 km^{2} (0.978 sq mi)

Population (2011)
  - Total: 1,764
  - Density: 696.1/km^{2} (1,803/sq mi)
- Time zone: UTC+5:30 (IST)
- PIN: 205267

Nagla Mitkar (Naglā Mitkar or Naglā Miṭkar) is a village in Sultanganj block of Mainpuri district, Uttar Pradesh. As of 2011, it had a population of 1,764, in 279 households.

== Demographics ==
As of 2011, Nagla Mitkar had a population of 1,764, in 279 households. This population was 51.9% male (915) and 48.1% female (849). The 0-6 age group numbered 324 (169 male and 155 female), or 18.4% of the total population. 162 residents were members of Scheduled Castes, or 9.2% of the total.

The 1981 census recorded Nagla Mitkar as having a population of 949 people, in 169 households.

The 1961 census recorded Nagla Mitkar as comprising 1 hamlet, with a total population of 818 people (458 male and 360 female), in 182 households and 126 physical houses. The area of the village was given as 633 acres.

== Infrastructure ==
As of 2011, Nagla Mitkar had 1 primary school; it did not have any healthcare facilities. Drinking water was provided by well, hand pump, and tube well/borehole; there were no public toilets. The village had a public library but no post office; there was at least some access to electricity for all purposes. Streets were made of both kachcha and pakka materials.
