= Asafpur, Mainpuri =

Village in Uttar Pradesh, India

Asafpur
- Village
- Location in Uttar Pradesh, India
- Coordinates: 27.33716°N 79.19495°E
- Country: India
- State: Uttar Pradesh
- District: Mainpuri
- Tehsil: Bhongaon

Area
  - Total: 1.23 km^{2} (0.47 sq mi)

Population (2011)
  - Total: 455
  - Density: 370/km^{2} (958/sq mi)
- Time zone: UTC+5:30 (IST)
- PIN: 205267

Asafpur (Āsafpur) is a village in Sultanganj block of Mainpuri district, Uttar Pradesh. As of 2011, it had a population of 455, in 92 households.

== Demographics ==
As of 2011, Asafpur had a population of 455, in 92 households. This population was 51.6% male (235) and 48.4% female (220). The 0-6 age group numbered 53 (25 male and 28 female), or 11.6% of the total population. 126 residents were members of Scheduled Castes, or 27.7% of the total.

The 1981 census recorded Asafpur as having a population of 328 people, in 60 households.

The 1961 census recorded Asafpur as comprising 1 hamlet, with a total population of 243 people (139 male and 104 female), in 50 households and 38 physical houses. The area of the village was given as 306 acres.

== Infrastructure ==
As of 2011, Asafpur had 1 middle school (but no primary or secondary schools); it did not have any healthcare facilities. Drinking water was provided by hand pump and tube well/borehole; there were no public toilets. The village did not have a post office or public library; there was at least some access to electricity for all purposes. Streets were made of both kachcha and pakka materials.
