= Tisauli =

Village in Uttar Pradesh, India

- Village
- Location in Uttar Pradesh, India
- Coordinates: 27.34364°N 79.03014°E
- Country: India
- State: Uttar Pradesh
- District: Mainpuri
- Tehsil: Bhongaon

Area
  - Total: 9.164 km^{2} (3.538 sq mi)

Population (2011)
  - Total: 5,477
  - Density: 597.7/km^{2} (1,548/sq mi)
- Time zone: UTC+5:30 (IST)
- PIN: 206267

Tisauli (Tisaulī) is a village in Sultanganj block of Mainpuri district, Uttar Pradesh, India. As of 2011, it had a population of 5,477, in 886 households.

== Demographics ==
As of 2011, Tisauli had a population of 5,477, in 886 households. This population was 53.5% male (2,929) and 46.5% female (2,548). The 0-6 age group numbered 941 (484 male and 457 female), or 17.2% of the total population. 1,014 residents were members of Scheduled Castes, or 18.5% of the total.

The 1981 census recorded Tisauli as having a population of 2,817 people, in 467 households.

The 1961 census recorded Tisauli as comprising 7 hamlets, with a total population of 1,896 people (981 male and 915 female), in 346 households and 235 physical houses. The area of the village was given as 2,113 acres.

== Infrastructure ==
As of 2011, Tisauli had 3 primary schools; it did not have any healthcare facilities. Drinking water was provided by hand pump; there were no public toilets. The village had a post office but no public library; there was at least some access to electricity for residential and agricultural purposes. Streets were made of both kachcha and pakka materials.
