= Kamalpur, Sultanganj =

Village in Uttar Pradesh, India

Kamalpur
- Village
- Location in Uttar Pradesh, India
- Coordinates: 27.32498°N 79.18246°E
- Country: India
- State: Uttar Pradesh
- District: Mainpuri
- Tehsil: Bhongaon

Area
  - Total: 1.117 km^{2} (0.431 sq mi)

Population (2011)
  - Total: 525
  - Density: 470/km^{2} (1,220/sq mi)
- Time zone: UTC+5:30 (IST)

Kamalpur is a village in Sultanganj block of Mainpuri district, Uttar Pradesh. As of 2011, it has a population of 525, in 83 households.

== Demographics ==
As of 2011, Kamalpur had a population of 525, in 83 households. This population was 53.5% male (281) and 46.5% female (244). The 0-6 age group numbered 56 (36 male and 20 female), or 10.7% of the total population. 94 residents were members of Scheduled Castes, or 17.9% of the total.

The 1981 census recorded Kamalpur as having a population of 495 people, in 94 households.

The 1961 census recorded Kamalpur as comprising 1 hamlet, with a total population of 357 people (192 male and 165 female), in 69 households and 41 physical houses. The area of the village was given as 279 acres.

== Infrastructure ==
As of 2011, Kamalpur had 1 primary school; it did not have any healthcare facilities. Drinking water was provided by hand pump, and tube well/borehole; there were no public toilets. The village had a post office but no public library; there was at least some access to electricity for all purposes. Streets were made of kachcha materials.
