= Birsinghpur, Sultanganj =

Village in Uttar Pradesh, India

Birsinghpur
- Village
- Location in Uttar Pradesh, India
- Coordinates: 27.31335°N 79.2025°E
- Country: India
- State: Uttar Pradesh
- District: Mainpuri
- Tehsil: Bhongaon

Area
  - Total: 0.994 km^{2} (0.384 sq mi)

Population (2011)
  - Total: 568
  - Density: 571/km^{2} (1,480/sq mi)
- Time zone: UTC+5:30 (IST)
- PIN: 205267

Birsinghpur (Bīrsinhpur) is a village in Sultanganj block of Mainpuri district, Uttar Pradesh. As of 2011, it had a population of 568, in 89 households.

== Demographics ==
As of 2011, Birsinghpur had a population of 568, in 89 households. This population was 52.5% male (298) and 47.5% female (270). The 0-6 age group numbered 97 (49 male and 48 female), or 17.1% of the total population. No residents were members of Scheduled Castes.

The 1981 census recorded Birsinghpur as having a population of 328 people, in 47 households.

The 1961 census recorded Birsinghpur as comprising 2 hamlets, with a total population of 195 people (103 male and 92 female), in 28 households and 28 physical houses. The area of the village was given as 250 acres.

== Infrastructure ==
As of 2011, Birsinghpur had 1 primary school; it did not have any healthcare facilities. Drinking water was provided by hand pump, tube well/borehole, and spring; there were no public toilets. The village had a post office but no public library; there was at least some access to electricity for all purposes. Streets were made of both kachcha and pakka materials.
