= Lalupura =

Village in Uttar Pradesh, India

- Village
- Location in Uttar Pradesh, India
- Coordinates: 27.24102°N 79.09188°E
- Country: India
- State: Uttar Pradesh
- District: Mainpuri
- Tehsil: Bhongaon

Area
  - Total: 0.702 km^{2} (0.271 sq mi)

Population (2011)
  - Total: 1,734
  - Density: 2,470/km^{2} (6,400/sq mi)
- Time zone: UTC+5:30 (IST)

Lalupura is a village in Sultanganj block of Mainpuri district, Uttar Pradesh. As of 2011, it has a population of 1,734, in 279 households.

== Demographics ==
As of 2011, Lalupura had a population of 1,734, in 279 households. This population was 52.9% male (917) and 47.1% female (817). The 0-6 age group numbered 295 (171 male and 124 female), or 17.0% of the total population. 135 residents were members of Scheduled Castes, or 7.8% of the total.

The 1981 census recorded Lalupura as having a population of 917 people, in 158 households.

The 1961 census recorded Lalupura as comprising 3 hamlets, with a total population of 660 people (365 male and 295 female), in 145 households and 92 physical houses. The area of the village was given as 774 acres.

== Infrastructure ==
As of 2011, Lalupura had 3 primary schools and 1 family welfare centre. Drinking water was provided by hand pump and tube well/borehole; there were no public toilets. The village did not have a post office or public library; there was at least some access to electricity for all purposes. Streets were made of both kachcha and pakka materials.
