= Binamau =

Village in Uttar Pradesh, India

- Village
- Location in Uttar Pradesh, India
- Coordinates: 27.29188°N 79.07982°E
- Country: India
- State: Uttar Pradesh
- District: Mainpuri
- Tehsil: Bhongaon

Area
  - Total: 0.975 km^{2} (0.376 sq mi)

Population (2011)
  - Total: 318
  - Density: 326/km^{2} (845/sq mi)
- Time zone: UTC+5:30 (IST)

Binamau (Bīnāmaū) is a village in Sultanganj block of Mainpuri district, Uttar Pradesh. As of 2011, it has a population of 318, in 48 households.

== Demographics ==
As of 2011, Binamau had a population of 318, in 48 households. This population was 53.8% male (171) and 46.2% female (147). The 0-6 age group numbered 41 (25 male and 16 female), or 12.9% of the total population. No residents were members of Scheduled Castes.

The 1981 census recorded Binamau as having a population of 143 people, in 30 households.

The 1961 census recorded Binamau as comprising 1 hamlet, with a total population of 122 people (70 male and 52 female), in 25 households and 19 physical houses. The area of the village was given as 243 acres.

== Infrastructure ==
As of 2011, Binamau did not have any schools or health care facilities. Drinking water was provided by hand pump and tube well/borehole; there were no public toilets. The village had a post office but no public library; there was at least some access to electricity for commercial and agricultural (but not residential) purposes. Streets were made of both kachcha and pakka materials.
