= Mohanpur, Sultanganj =

Village in Uttar Pradesh, India

Mohanpur
- Village
- Location in Uttar Pradesh, India
- Coordinates: 27.23302°N 79.08747°E
- Country: India
- State: Uttar Pradesh
- District: Mainpuri
- Tehsil: Bhongaon

Area
  - Total: 1.532 km^{2} (0.592 sq mi)

Population (2011)
  - Total: 1,497
  - Density: 977.2/km^{2} (2,531/sq mi)
- Time zone: UTC+5:30 (IST)

Mohanpur is a village in Sultanganj block of Mainpuri district, Uttar Pradesh. As of 2011, it had a population of 1,497, in 243 households.

== Demographics ==
As of 2011, Mohanpur had a population of 1,497, in 243 households. This population was 52.5% male (771) and 48.5% female (726). The 0-6 age group numbered 266 (132 male and 134 female), or 17.8% of the total population. 622 residents were members of Scheduled Castes, or 41.5% of the total.

The 1981 census recorded Mohanpur as having a population of 749 people, in 134 households.

The 1961 census recorded Mohanpur as comprising 1 hamlet, with a total population of 490 people (260 male and 230 female), in 87 households and 68 physical houses. The area of the village was given as 403 acres.

== Infrastructure ==
As of 2011, Mohanpur had 1 primary school; it did not have any healthcare facilities. Drinking water was provided by hand pump and tube well/borehole; there were no public toilets. The village had a post office but no public library; there was at least some access to electricity for all purposes. Streets were made of both kachcha and pakka materials.
