= Dhanmau =

Village in Uttar Pradesh, India

- Village
- Location in Uttar Pradesh, India
- Coordinates: 27.35296°N 79.09452°E
- Country: India
- State: Uttar Pradesh
- District: Mainpuri
- Tehsil: Bhongaon

Area
  - Total: 1.658 km^{2} (0.640 sq mi)

Population (2011)
  - Total: 1,489
  - Density: 898.1/km^{2} (2,326/sq mi)
- Time zone: UTC+5:30 (IST)

Dhanmau (Dhanmaū) is a village in Sultanganj block of Mainpuri district, Uttar Pradesh, India. As of 2011, it had a population of 1,489, in 229 households.

== Demographics ==
As of 2011, Dhanmau had a population of 1,489, in 229 households. This population was 55.3% male (824) and 44.7% female (665). The 0-6 age group numbered 211 (113 male and 98 female), or 14.2% of the total population. 394 residents were members of Scheduled Castes, or 26.5% of the total.

The 1981 census recorded Dhanmau as having a population of 953 people, in 165 households.

The 1961 census recorded Dhanmau as comprising 1 hamlet, with a total population of 684 people (387 male and 297 female), in 73 households and 70 physical houses. The area of the village was given as 400 acres.

== Infrastructure ==
As of 2011, Dhanmau had 1 primary school; it did not have any healthcare facilities. Drinking water was provided by tap, hand pump, and tube well; there were no public toilets. The village had a public library but no post office; there was at least some access to electricity for all purposes. Streets were made of both kachcha and pakka materials.

== Land use ==
According to the 2011 census, Dhanmau has a total area of 165.8 hectares, of which 141.9 were currently farmland and 0.5 were under non-agricultural use. 1.1 hectares were occupied by orchards, another 1.1 were occupied by permanent pastures, 0.2 were classified as cultivable but not currently under any agricultural use, and 14.7 were classified as non-cultivable. No forests existed on village lands.
