= Darka, Mainpuri =

Village in Uttar Pradesh, India

Darka
- Village
- Location in Uttar Pradesh, India
- Coordinates: 27.3290362°N 79.2163642°E
- Country: India
- State: Uttar Pradesh
- District: Mainpuri
- Tehsil: Bhongaon

Area
  - Total: 0.501 km^{2} (0.193 sq mi)

Population (2011)
  - Total: 0
  - Density: 0.0/km^{2} (0.0/sq mi)
- Time zone: UTC+5:30 (IST)

Darka (Darkā) is an abandoned village in Sultanganj block of Mainpuri district, Uttar Pradesh. As of 2011, it has a population of 0, although the land remains under human use.

== Demographics ==
The 2011 census recorded Darka with a population of 0, as did the 1981 census.

The 1961 census, however, recorded Darka as being inhabited: it comprised 1 hamlet, with a total population of 38 people (21 male and 17 female), in 38 households and 18 physical houses. The area of the village was given as 123 acres.

== Land use ==
According to the 2011 census, Darka has a total area of 50.1 hectares, of which 26.3 were currently farmland, 4.3 were fallow lands, and 19.4 were under non-agricultural use. No forests, orchards, or permanent pastures existed on village lands.
