= Usmanpur =

Village in Uttar Pradesh, India

- Village
- Location in Uttar Pradesh, India
- Coordinates: 27.21187°N 79.12377°E
- Country: India
- State: Uttar Pradesh
- District: Mainpuri
- Tehsil: Bhongaon

Area
  - Total: 0.982 km^{2} (0.379 sq mi)

Population (2011)
  - Total: 1,028
  - Density: 1,050/km^{2} (2,710/sq mi)
- Time zone: UTC+5:30 (IST)

Usmanpur (Usmānpur) is a village in Sultanganj block of Mainpuri district, Uttar Pradesh. As of 2011, it has a population of 1,028, in 171 households.

== Demographics ==
As of 2011, Usmanpur had a population of 1,028, in 171 households. This population was 54.0% male (555) and 46.0% female (473). The 0-6 age group numbered 159 (82 male 77 female), or 15.5% of the total population. 33 residents were members of Scheduled Castes, or 3.2% of the total.

The 1981 census recorded Usmanpur as having a population of 588 people, in 97 households.

The 1961 census recorded Usmanpur as comprising 1 hamlet, with a total population of 418 people (231 male and 187 female), in 85 households and 48 physical houses. The area of the village was given as 247 acres.

== Infrastructure ==
As of 2011, Usmanpur had 1 primary school; it did not have any healthcare facilities. Drinking water was provided by hand pump and tube well; there were no public toilets. The village did had a post office but no public library; there was at least some access to electricity for all purposes. Streets were made of both kachcha and pakka materials.
