= Badanpur, Mainpuri =

Village in Uttar Pradesh, India

Badanpur
- Village
- Location in Uttar Pradesh, India
- Coordinates: 27.2641°N 78.95451°E
- Country: India
- State: Uttar Pradesh
- District: Mainpuri
- Tehsil: Mainpuri

Area
  - Total: 2.15 km^{2} (0.83 sq mi)

Population (2011)
  - Total: 712
  - Density: 331/km^{2} (858/sq mi)
- Time zone: UTC+5:30 (IST)
- PIN: 205263

Badanpur (Bādanpur) is a village in Mainpuri block of Mainpuri district, Uttar Pradesh, India. As of 2011, it had a population of 712, in 117 households.

== Demographics ==
As of 2011, Badanpur had a population of 712, in 117 households. This population was 51.3% male (365) and 48.7% female (347). The 0-6 age group numbered 130 (62 male and 68 female), or 18.3% of the total population. 698 residents were members of Scheduled Castes, or 98.0% of the total.

The 1981 census recorded Badanpur as having a population of 286 people, in 57 households.

The 1961 census recorded Badanpur as comprising 1 hamlet, with a total population of 209 people (116 male and 93 female), in 45 households and 32 physical houses. The area of the village was given as 535 acres.

== Infrastructure ==
As of 2011, Badanpur had 1 primary school; it did not have any healthcare facilities. Drinking water was provided by hand pump and tube well; there were no public toilets. The village had a post office but no public library; there was at least some access to electricity for all purposes. Streets were made of both kachcha and pakka materials.
