= Bhaupur, Mainpuri =

Village in Uttar Pradesh, India

Bhaupur
- Village
- Location in Uttar Pradesh, India
- Coordinates: 27.28495°N 78.97422°E
- Country: India
- State: Uttar Pradesh
- District: Mainpuri
- Tehsil: Mainpuri

Area
  - Total: 1.115 km^{2} (0.431 sq mi)

Population (2011)
  - Total: 976
  - Density: 875/km^{2} (2,270/sq mi)
- Time zone: UTC+5:30 (IST)

Bhaupur (Bhāūpur) is a village in Mainpuri block of Mainpuri district, Uttar Pradesh. As of 2011, it has a population of 976, in 159 households.

== Demographics ==
As of 2011, Bhaupur had a population of 976, in 159 households. This population was 53.5% male (522) and 46.5% female (454). The 0-6 age group numbered 146 (76 male and 70 female), or 15.0% of the total population. No residents were members of Scheduled Castes.

The 1981 census recorded Bhaupur as having a population of 606 people, in 97 households.

The 1961 census recorded Bhaupur (as "Bhanpur") as comprising 1 hamlet, with a total population of 352 people (198 male and 154 female), in 68 households and 49 physical houses. The area of the village was given as 400 acres.

== Infrastructure ==
As of 2011, Bhaupur had 2 primary schools; it did not have any healthcare facilities. Drinking water was provided by hand pump, tube well, and spring; there were no public toilets. The village had a public library but no post office; there was at least some access to electricity for residential and agricultural purposes. Streets were made of pakka materials.
