= Rudauniya =

Village in Uttar Pradesh, India

- Village
- Location in Uttar Pradesh, India
- Coordinates: 27.34705°N 79.11179°E
- Country: India
- State: Uttar Pradesh
- District: Mainpuri
- Tehsil: Bhongaon

Area
  - Total: 0.86 km^{2} (0.33 sq mi)

Population (2011)
  - Total: 26
  - Density: 30/km^{2} (78/sq mi)
- Time zone: UTC+5:30 (IST)

Rudauniya (Rudauniyā) is a village in Sultanganj block of Mainpuri district, Uttar Pradesh, India. As of 2011, it had a population of 26, in 5 households.

== Demographics ==
As of 2011, Rudauniya had a population of 26, in 5 households. This population was 57.9% male (15) and 42.1% female (11). The 0-6 age group numbered 1 (0 male and 1 female), or 3.8% of the total population. 25 residents were members of Scheduled Castes, or 96.2% of the total.

The 1981 census recorded Rudauniya as having a population of 33 people, in 5 households.

The 1961 census recorded Rudauniya (as "Rudainiya") as comprising 1 hamlet, with a total population of 57 people (34 male and 23 female), in 14 households and 9 physical houses. The area of the village was given as 215 acres.

== Infrastructure ==
As of 2011, Rudauniya did not have any schools or healthcare facilities. Drinking water was provided by hand pump and tube well; there were no public toilets. The village did not have a post office or public library; there was at least some access to electricity for agricultural purposes, but not for residential or commercial uses. Streets were made of both kachcha and pakka materials.
