= Fardpur =

Village in Uttar Pradesh, India

- Village
- Location in Uttar Pradesh, India
- Coordinates: 27.30919°N 79.10815°E
- Country: India
- State: Uttar Pradesh
- District: Mainpuri
- Tehsil: Bhongaon

Area
  - Total: 0.99 km^{2} (0.38 sq mi)

Population (2011)
  - Total: 1,183
  - Density: 1,200/km^{2} (3,100/sq mi)
- Time zone: UTC+5:30 (IST)

Fardpur (Fardpur) is a village in Sultanganj block of Mainpuri district, Uttar Pradesh, India. As of 2011, it had a population of 1,183, in 208 households.

== Demographics ==
As of 2011, Fardpur had a population of 1,183, in 208 households. This population was 52.3% male (619) and 47.7% female (564). The 0-6 age group numbered 198 (109 male and 89 female), or 16.7% of the total population. 263 residents were members of Scheduled Castes, or 22.2% of the total.

The 1981 census recorded Fardpur (as "Faradpur") as having a population of 670 people, in 116 households.

The 1961 census recorded Fardpur as comprising 1 hamlet, with a total population of 459 people (251 male and 208 female), in 102 households and 83 physical houses. The area of the village was given as 249 acres.

== Infrastructure ==
As of 2011, Fardpur had 1 primary school; it did not have any healthcare facilities. The village had a post office but no public library; there was at least some access to electricity for all purposes. Streets were made of both kachcha and pakka materials.
