= Halpura, Mainpuri =

Village in Uttar Pradesh, India

Halpura
- Village
- Location in Uttar Pradesh, India
- Coordinates: 27.18238°N 78.95655°E
- Country: India
- State: Uttar Pradesh
- District: Mainpuri
- Tehsil: Mainpuri

Area
  - Total: 7.751 km^{2} (2.993 sq mi)

Population (2011)
  - Total: 3,415
  - Density: 440.6/km^{2} (1,141/sq mi)
- Time zone: UTC+5:30 (IST)

Halpura (Halpurā) is a village in Mainpuri block of Mainpuri district, Uttar Pradesh. As of 2011, it has a population of 3,415, in 580 households.

== Demographics ==
As of 2011, Halpura had a population of 3,415, in 580 households. This population was 54.9% male (1,874) and 45.1% female (1,541). The 0-6 age group numbered 502 (280 male and 222 female), or 14.7% of the total population. 548 residents were members of Scheduled Castes, or 16.0% of the total.

The 1981 census recorded Halpura as having a population of 1,763 people, in 296 households.

The 1961 census recorded Halpura as comprising 9 hamlets, with a total population of 1,365 people (706 male and 659 female), in 246 households and 226 physical houses. The area of the village was given as 2,044 acres.

== Infrastructure ==
As of 2011, Halpura had 1 primary school; it did not have any healthcare facilities. Drinking water was provided by well, hand pump, and tube well; there were no public toilets. The village had a post office but no public library; there was at least some access to electricity for all purposes. Streets were made of both kachcha and pakka materials.
