= Jaili Jirauli =

Village in Uttar Pradesh, India

- Village
- Location in Uttar Pradesh, India
- Coordinates: 27.3593308°N 79.049534°E
- Country: India
- State: Uttar Pradesh
- District: Mainpuri
- Tehsil: Bhongaon

Area
  - Total: 9.946 km^{2} (3.840 sq mi)

Population (2011)
  - Total: 3,910
  - Density: 393/km^{2} (1,020/sq mi)
- Time zone: UTC+5:30 (IST)
- PIN: 205267

Jaili Jirauli (Jailī Jiraulī) is a village in Sultanganj block of Mainpuri district, Uttar Pradesh, India. As of 2011, it had a population of 3,910, in 601 households.

== Demographics ==
As of 2011, Jaili Jirauli had a population of 3,910, in 601 households. This population was 52.3% male (2,043) and 47.7% female (1,867). The 0-6 age group numbered 679 (345 male and 334 female), or 17.4% of the total population. 472 residents were members of Scheduled Castes, or 12.1% of the total.

The 1981 census recorded Jaili Jirauli as having a population of 2,231 people, in 386 households.

The 1961 census recorded Jaili Jirauli (as "Jeli Jirauli") as comprising 2 hamlets, with a total population of 1,627 people (879 male and 748 female), in 298 households and 209 physical houses. The area of the village was given as 2,474 acres.

== Infrastructure ==
As of 2011, Jaili Jirauli had 1 primary school; it did not have any healthcare facilities. Drinking water was provided by hand pump, and tube well/borehole; there were no public toilets. The village had a post office but no public library; there was at least some access to electricity for all purposes. Streets were made of both kachcha and pakka materials.
