= Bichhawan =

Village in Uttar Pradesh, India

- Village
- Location in Uttar Pradesh, India
- Coordinates: 27.33956°N 79.06234°E
- Country: India
- State: Uttar Pradesh
- District: Mainpuri
- Tehsil: Bhongaon

Area
  - Total: 6.57 km^{2} (2.54 sq mi)

Population (2011)
  - Total: 4,566
  - Density: 695/km^{2} (1,800/sq mi)
- Time zone: UTC+5:30 (IST)
- PIN: 205267

Bichhawan is a village in Sultanganj block of Mainpuri district, Uttar Pradesh. As of 2011, it has a population of 4,566, in 776 households.

== Demographics ==
As of 2011, Bichhawan had a population of 4,566, in 776 households. This population was 52.6% male (2,402) and 47.4% female (2,164). The 0-6 age group numbered 768 (411 male and 357 female), or 16.8% of the total population. 1,273 residents were members of Scheduled Castes, or 27.9% of the total.

The 1981 census recorded Bichhawan as having a population of 2,509 people, in 405 households.

The 1961 census recorded Bichhawan as comprising 5 hamlets, with a total population of 1,690 people (884 male and 806 female), in 322 households and 254 physical houses. The area of the village was given as 1,669 acres and it had a post office at that point.

== Infrastructure ==
As of 2011, Bichhawan had 2 primary schools and 1 primary health centre. Drinking water was provided hand pump and tube well/borehole; there were no public toilets. The village had a post office but no public library; there was at least some access to electricity for all purposes. Streets were made of both kachcha and pakka materials.
