= Lehra =

Village in Uttar Pradesh, India

- Village
- Location in Uttar Pradesh, India
- Coordinates: 27.40648°N 79.05459°E
- Country: India
- State: Uttar Pradesh
- District: Mainpuri
- Tehsil: Bhongaon

Area
  - Total: 3.057 km^{2} (1.180 sq mi)

Population (2011)
  - Total: 2,480
  - Density: 811/km^{2} (2,100/sq mi)
- Time zone: UTC+5:30 (IST)
- PIN: 205267

Lehra (Lehrā) is a village in Sultanganj block of Mainpuri district, Uttar Pradesh, India. As of 2011, it had a population of 2,480, in 429 households.

== Demographics ==
As of 2011, Lehra had a population of 2,480, in 429 households. This population was 54.8% male (1,359) and 45.2% female (1,121). The 0-6 age group numbered 465 (261 male and 204 female), or 18.75% of the total population. 177 residents were members of Scheduled Castes, or 7.1% of the total.

The 1981 census recorded Lehra as having a population of 1,751 people, in 320 households.

The 1961 census recorded Lehra as comprising 2 hamlets, with a total population of 1,386 people (768 male and 618 female), in 284 households and 170 physical houses. The area of the village was given as 763 acres and it was part of Kuraoli CD block at that point.

== Infrastructure ==
As of 2011, Lehra had 1 primary school; it did not have any healthcare facilities. Drinking water was provided by well, hand pump, and tube well/borehole; there were no public toilets. The village had a post office and public library, as well as at least some access to electricity for all purposes. Streets were made of both kachcha and pakka materials.
