= Tindauli =

Village in Uttar Pradesh, India

- Village
- Location in Uttar Pradesh, India
- Coordinates: 27.18376°N 78.92167°E
- Country: India
- State: Uttar Pradesh
- District: Mainpuri
- Tehsil: Mainpuri

Area
  - Total: 3.77 km^{2} (1.46 sq mi)

Population (2011)
  - Total: 1,796
  - Density: 476/km^{2} (1,230/sq mi)
- Time zone: UTC+5:30 (IST)
- PIN: 205119

Tindauli (Ṭiṇḍaulī), also spelled Tindoli, is a village in Mainpuri block of Mainpuri district, Uttar Pradesh, India. As of 2011, it had a population of 1,796, in 295 households.

== Demographics ==
As of 2011, Tindauli had a population of 1,796, in 295 households. This population was 54.1% male (972) and 45.9% female (824). The 0–6 age group numbered 314 (182 male and 132 female), or 17.5% of the total population. 341 residents were members of Scheduled Castes, or 19.0% of the total.

The 1981 census recorded Tindauli as having a population of 1,014 people, in 175 households.

The 1961 census recorded Tindauli as comprising 3 hamlets, with a total population of 755 people (399 male and 356 female), in 138 households and 137 physical houses. The area of the village was given as 937 acres and it had a post office at that point.

== Infrastructure ==
As of 2011, Tindauli had 1 primary school; it did not have any healthcare facilities. Drinking water was provided by well, hand pump, and tube well; there were no public toilets. The village did not have a post office or public library; there was at least some access to electricity for all purposes. Streets were made of both kachcha and pakka materials.
