= Rakri, Uttar Pradesh =

Village in Uttar Pradesh, India

Rakri
- Village
- Location in Uttar Pradesh, India
- Coordinates: 27.30724°N 79.2153°E
- Country: India
- State: Uttar Pradesh
- District: Mainpuri
- Tehsil: Bhongaon

Area
  - Total: 0.919 km^{2} (0.355 sq mi)

Population (2011)
  - Total: 1,717
  - Density: 1,870/km^{2} (4,840/sq mi)
- Time zone: UTC+5:30 (IST)
- PIN: 205262

Rakri (Rakrī) is a village in Sultanganj block of Mainpuri district, Uttar Pradesh, India. As of 2011, it had a population of 1,717, in 291 households.

== Demographics ==
As of 2011, Rakri had a population of 1,717, in 291 households. This population was 51.3% male (880) and 48.7% female (837). The 0-6 age group numbered 308 (146 male and 162 female), or 17.9% of the total population. 706 residents were members of Scheduled Castes, or 41.1% of the total.

The 1981 census recorded Rakri as having a population of 1,128 people, in 210 households.

The 1961 census recorded Rakri as comprising 2 hamlets, with a total population of 957 people (494 male and 463 female), in 195 households and 167 physical houses. The area of the village was given as 225 acres.

== Infrastructure ==
As of 2011, Rakri had 1 primary school; it did not have any healthcare facilities. Drinking water was provided by hand pump and tube well/borehole; there were no public toilets. The village had a public library but no post office; there was at least some access to electricity for all purposes. Streets were made of both kachcha and pakka materials.
