= Padampur, Mainpuri =

Village in Uttar Pradesh, India

Padampur
- Village
- Location in Uttar Pradesh, India
- Coordinates: 27.21157°N 79.21579°E
- Country: India
- State: Uttar Pradesh
- District: Mainpuri
- Tehsil: Bhongaon

Area
  - Total: 3.359 km^{2} (1.297 sq mi)

Population (2011)
  - Total: 2,130
  - Density: 634/km^{2} (1,640/sq mi)
- Time zone: UTC+5:30 (IST)

Padampur (Padampur) is a village in Sultanganj block of Mainpuri district, Uttar Pradesh. As of 2011, it has a population of 2,130, in 371 households.

== Demographics ==
As of 2011, Padampur had a population of 2,130, in 371 households. This population was 51.5% male (1,096) and 48.5% female (1,034). The 0-6 age group numbered 318 (175 male and 143 female), or 14.9% of the total population. 345 residents were members of Scheduled Castes, or 16.2% of the total.

The 1981 census recorded Padampur as having a population of 1,460 people, in 239 households.

The 1961 census recorded Padampur as comprising 2 hamlets, with a total population of 1,066 people (553 male and 513 female), in 183 households and 122 physical houses. The area of the village was given as 662 acres.

== Infrastructure ==
As of 2011, Padampur had 2 primary schools; it did not have any healthcare facilities. Drinking water was provided by tap, hand pump, and tube well/borehole; there were no public toilets. The village had a post office but no public library; there was at least some access to electricity for all purposes. Streets were made of both kachcha and pakka materials.
