= Sulkhanpur =

Village in Uttar Pradesh, India

- Village
- Location in Uttar Pradesh, India
- Coordinates: 27.28906°N 79.16284°E
- Country: India
- State: Uttar Pradesh
- District: Mainpuri
- Tehsil: Bhongaon

Area
  - Total: 1.608 km^{2} (0.621 sq mi)

Population (2011)
  - Total: 2,326
  - Density: 1,447/km^{2} (3,746/sq mi)
- Time zone: UTC+5:30 (IST)

Sulkhanpur (Sulkhanpur) is a village in Sultanganj block of Mainpuri district, Uttar Pradesh. As of 2011, it has a population of 2,326, in 414 households.

== Demographics ==
As of 2011, Sulkhanpur had a population of 2,326, in 414 households. This population was 52.0% male (1,210) and 48.0% female (1,116). The 0-6 age group numbered 424 (217 male and 207 female), or 18.2% of the total population. 425 residents were members of Scheduled Castes, or 18.3% of the total.

The 1981 census recorded Sulkhanpur as having a population of 1,224.

The 1961 census recorded Sulkhanpur as comprising 2 hamlets, with a total population of 846 people (462 male and 384 female), in 147 households and 116 physical houses. The area of the village was given as 395 acres.

== Infrastructure ==
As of 2011, Sulkhanpur had 2 primary schools; it did not have any healthcare facilities. Drinking water was provided by hand pump and tube well/borehole; there were no public toilets. The village had a post office but no public library; there was at least some access to electricity for all purposes. Streets were made of both kachcha and pakka materials.
