= Richhpura =

Village in Uttar Pradesh, India

- Village
- Location in Uttar Pradesh, India
- Coordinates: 27.38106°N 78.9506°E
- Country: India
- State: Uttar Pradesh
- District: Mainpuri
- Tehsil: Mainpuri

Area
  - Total: 1.397 km^{2} (0.539 sq mi)

Population (2011)
  - Total: 1,458
  - Density: 1,044/km^{2} (2,703/sq mi)
- Time zone: UTC+5:30 (IST)

Richhpura (Richhpurā) is a village in Kuraoli block of Mainpuri district, Uttar Pradesh. As of 2011, it has a population of 1,458, in 264 households.

== Demographics ==
As of 2011, Richhpura had a population of 1,458, in 264 households. This population was 51.4% male (749) and 48.6% female (709). The 0-6 age group numbered 259 (141 male and 118 female), or 17.8% of the total population. 273 residents were members of Scheduled Castes, or 18.7% of the total.

The 1981 census recorded Richhpura as having a population of 644 people, in 115 households.

The 1961 census recorded Richhpura as comprising 1 hamlet, with a total population of 370 people (201 male and 169 female), in 85 households and 69 physical houses. The area of the village was given as 357 acres.

== Infrastructure ==
As of 2011, Richhpura had 1 primary school; it did not have any healthcare facilities. Drinking water was provided by tap and hand pump; there were no public toilets. The village did not have a post office or public library; there was at least some access to electricity for all purposes. Streets were made of both kachcha and pakka materials.
