= Jasrau =

Village in Uttar Pradesh, India

- Village
- Location in Uttar Pradesh, India
- Coordinates: 27.29241°N 79.01053°E
- Country: India
- State: Uttar Pradesh
- District: Mainpuri
- Tehsil: Mainpuri

Area
  - Total: 3.458 km^{2} (1.335 sq mi)

Population (2011)
  - Total: 2,025
  - Density: 585.6/km^{2} (1,517/sq mi)
- Time zone: UTC+5:30 (IST)

Jasrau (Jasraū) is a village in Mainpuri block of Mainpuri district, Uttar Pradesh, India. As of 2011, it had a population of 2,025, in 323 households.

== Demographics ==
As of 2011, Jasrau had a population of 2,025, in 323 households. This population was 52.8% male (1,069) and 47.2% female (956). The 0-6 age group numbered 336 (178 male and 158 female), or 16.6% of the total population. 419 residents were members of Scheduled Castes, or 20.7% of the total.

The 1981 census recorded Jasrau as having a population of 1,053 people, in 179 households.

The 1961 census recorded Jasrau as comprising 1 hamlet, with a total population of 738 people (403 male and 335 female), in 122 households and 101 physical houses. The area of the village was given as 873 acres.

== Infrastructure ==
As of 2011, Jasrau had 1 primary school and 1 primary health centre. Drinking water was provided by hand pump and tube well/borehole; there were no public toilets. The village had a post office and public library, as well as at least some access to electricity for all purposes. Streets were made of both kachcha and pakka materials.
