= Sagauni =

Village in Uttar Pradesh, India

- Village
- Location in Uttar Pradesh, India
- Coordinates: 27.17505°N 78.97453°E
- Country: India
- State: Uttar Pradesh
- District: Mainpuri
- Tehsil: Mainpuri

Area
  - Total: 6.05 km^{2} (2.34 sq mi)

Population (2011)
  - Total: 4,507
  - Density: 745/km^{2} (1,930/sq mi)
- Time zone: UTC+5:30 (IST)

Sagauni (Sagaunī) is a village in Mainpuri block of Mainpuri district, Uttar Pradesh. As of 2011, it has a population of 4,507, in 720 households.

== Demographics ==
As of 2011, Sagauni had a population of 4,507, in 720 households. This population was 54.3% male (2,446) and 45.7% female (2,061). The 0-6 age group numbered 645 (360 male and 285 female), or 14.3% of the total population. 239 residents were members of Scheduled Castes, or 5.3% of the total.

The 1981 census recorded Sagauni as having a population of 2,967 people, in 478 households.

The 1961 census recorded Sagauni as comprising 4 hamlets, with a total population of 1,907 people (995 male and 912 female), in 369 households and 267 physical houses. The area of the village was given as 1,527 acres.

== Infrastructure ==
As of 2011, Sagauni had 1 primary school; it did not have any healthcare facilities. Drinking water was provided by well, hand pump, and tube well; there were no public toilets. The village had a post office but no public library; there was at least some access to electricity for all purposes. Streets were made of kachcha materials.
