= Kishanpur, Mainpuri =

Village in Uttar Pradesh, India

Kishanpur
- Village
- Location in Uttar Pradesh, India
- Coordinates: 27.41631°N 78.96751°E
- Country: India
- State: Uttar Pradesh
- District: Mainpuri
- Tehsil: Mainpuri

Area
  - Total: 0.66 km^{2} (0.25 sq mi)

Population (2011)
  - Total: 330
  - Density: 500/km^{2} (1,300/sq mi)
- Time zone: UTC+5:30 (IST)

Kishanpur (Kiśanpur) is a village in Kuraoli block of Mainpuri district, Uttar Pradesh. As of 2011, it has a population of 330, in 60 households.

== Demographics ==
As of 2011, Kishanpur had a population of 330, in 60 households. This population was 58.5% male (163) and 41.5% female (137). The 0-6 age group numbered 47 (28 male and 19 female), or 14.2% of the total population. No residents were members of Scheduled Castes.

The 1981 census recorded Kishanpur as having a population of 178 people, in 30 households.

The 1961 census recorded Kishanpur as comprising 1 hamlet, with a total population of 112 people (57 male and 55 female), in 19 households and 14 physical houses. The area of the village was given as 163 acres.

== Infrastructure ==
As of 2011, Kishanpur had 1 primary school; it did not have any healthcare facilities. Drinking water was provided by hand pump and tube well; there were no public toilets. The village had a post office but no public library; there was at least some access to electricity for all purposes. Streets were made of both kachcha and pakka materials.
