= Khichauli =

Village in Uttar Pradesh, India

- Village
- Location in Uttar Pradesh, India
- Coordinates: 27.33037°N 78.9024°E
- Country: India
- State: Uttar Pradesh
- District: Mainpuri
- Tehsil: Mainpuri

Area
  - Total: 4.25 km^{2} (1.64 sq mi)

Population (2011)
  - Total: 1,212
  - Density: 285/km^{2} (739/sq mi)
- Time zone: UTC+5:30 (IST)

Khichauli (Khichaulī) is a village in Kuraoli block of Mainpuri district, Uttar Pradesh. There is a prominent jhil near the village site. As of 2011, Khichauli had a population of 1,212, in 239 households.

== Geography ==
There is a prominent jhil at Khichauli .

== Demographics ==
As of 2011, Khichauli had a population of 1,212, in 239 households. This population was 49.6% male (601) and 50.4% female (611). The 0-6 age group numbered 201 (102 male and 99 female), or 16.6% of the total population. 640 residents were members of Scheduled Castes, or 52.8% of the total.

The 1981 census recorded Khichauli as having a population of 716 people, in 118 households.

The 1961 census recorded Khichauli (as "Kichauli") as comprising 3 hamlets, with a total population of 472 people (250 male and 222 female), in 94 households and 67 physical houses. The area of the village was given as 1,057 acres.

== Infrastructure ==
As of 2011, Khichauli had 1 primary school; it did not have any healthcare facilities. Drinking water was provided by hand pump and tube well; there were no public toilets. The village had a post office but no public library; there was at least some access to electricity for residential and agricultural purposes. Streets were made of both kachcha and pakka materials.
