= Dangau =

Village in Uttar Pradesh, India

- Village
- Location in Uttar Pradesh, India
- Coordinates: 27.36747°N 78.95306°E
- Country: India
- State: Uttar Pradesh
- District: Mainpuri
- Tehsil: Mainpuri

Area
  - Total: 2.445 km^{2} (0.944 sq mi)

Population (2011)
  - Total: 979
  - Density: 400/km^{2} (1,040/sq mi)
- Time zone: UTC+5:30 (IST)

Dangau (Ḍaṅgaū) is a village in Kuraoli block of Mainpuri district, Uttar Pradesh, India. As of 2011, it had a population of 979, in 170 households.

== Demographics ==
As of 2011, Dangau had a population of 979, in 170 households. This population was 53.9% male (528) and 46.1% female (451). The 0-6 age group numbered 179 (86 male and 93 female), or 18.2% of the total population. 701 residents were members of Scheduled Castes, or 71.6% of the total.

The 1981 census recorded Dangau as having a population of 564 people, in 98 households.

The 1961 census recorded Dangau as comprising 2 hamlets, with a total population of 417 people (223 male and 194 female), in 91 households and 73 physical houses. The area of the village was given as 586 acres.

== Infrastructure ==
As of 2011, Dangau had 1 primary school; it did not have any healthcare facilities. Drinking water was provided by tap and hand pump; there were no public toilets. The village had a post office but no public library; there was at least some access to electricity for residential and agricultural purposes. Streets were made of both kachcha and pakka materials.
