= Basura Sultanpur =

Village in Uttar Pradesh, India

- Village
- Location in Uttar Pradesh, India
- Coordinates: 27.38454°N 78.92188°E
- Country: India
- State: Uttar Pradesh
- District: Mainpuri
- Tehsil: Mainpuri

Area
  - Total: 4.12 km^{2} (1.59 sq mi)

Population (2011)
  - Total: 1,978
  - Density: 480/km^{2} (1,240/sq mi)
- Time zone: UTC+5:30 (IST)
- PIN: 205265

Basura Sultanpur (Basurā Sultānpur) is a village in Kuraoli block of Mainpuri district, Uttar Pradesh, India. As of 2011, it had a population of 1,978, in 367 households.

== Demographics ==
As of 2011, Basura Sultanpur had a population of 1,978, in 367 households. This population was 53.4% male (1,056) and 46.6% female (922). The 0–6 age group numbered 322 (170 male and 152 female), or 16.3% of the total population. 1,374 residents were members of Scheduled Castes, or 69.5% of the total.

The 1981 census recorded Basura Sultanpur as having a population of 1,181 people, in 217 households.

The 1961 census recorded Basura Sultanpur (as "Basra Sultanpur") as comprising 3 hamlets, with a total population of 865 people (477 male and 388 female), in 167 households and 136 physical houses. The area of the village was given as 1,023 acres.

== Infrastructure ==
As of 2011, Basura Sultanpur had 1 primary school; it did not have any healthcare facilities. Drinking water was provided by well, hand pump, and tube well; there were no public toilets. The village had a public library but no post office; there was at least some access to electricity for all purposes. Streets were made of both kachcha and pakka materials.
