= Manauna, Kuraoli =

Village in Uttar Pradesh, India

Manauna
- Village
- Location in Uttar Pradesh, India
- Coordinates: 27.32718°N 78.93367°E
- Country: India
- State: Uttar Pradesh
- District: Mainpuri
- Tehsil: Mainpuri

Area
  - Total: 16.626 km^{2} (6.419 sq mi)

Population (2011)
  - Total: 6,552
  - Density: 394.1/km^{2} (1,021/sq mi)
- Time zone: UTC+5:30 (IST)

Manauna (Manaunā) is a village in Kuraoli block of Mainpuri district, Uttar Pradesh, India. There is a prominent jhil near the village site. As of 2011, Manauna had a population of 6,552, in 1,044 households.

== Geography ==
There is a prominent jhil at Manauna.

== Demographics ==
As of 2011, Manauna had a population of 6,552, in 1,044 households. This population was 51.1% male (3,350) and 48.9% female (3,202). The 0-6 age group numbered 1,031 (518 male and 513 female), or 15.7% of the total population. 977 residents were members of Scheduled Castes, or 14.9% of the total.

The 1981 census recorded Manauna as having a population of 3,576 people, in 573 households.

The 1961 census recorded Manauna as comprising 9 hamlets, with a total population of 2,469 people (1,361 male and 1,108 female), in 415 households and 371 physical houses. The area of the village was given as 4,025 acres.

== Infrastructure ==
As of 2011, Manauna had 3 primary schools; it did not have any healthcare facilities. Drinking water was provided by well, hand pump, and tube well; there were no public toilets. The village had a post office but no public library; there was at least some access to electricity for all purposes. Streets were made of both kachcha and pakka materials.
