= Naurangpur, Mainpuri =

Village in Uttar Pradesh, India

Naurangpur
- Village
- Location in Uttar Pradesh, India
- Coordinates: 27.41185°N 78.99833°E
- Country: India
- State: Uttar Pradesh
- District: Mainpuri
- Tehsil: Mainpuri

Area
  - Total: 2.158 km^{2} (0.833 sq mi)

Population (2011)
  - Total: 1,239
  - Density: 574.1/km^{2} (1,487/sq mi)
- Time zone: UTC+5:30 (IST)

Naurangpur (Nauraṅgpur) is a village in Kuraoli block of Mainpuri district, Uttar Pradesh. As of 2011, it has a population of 1,239, in 212 households.

== Demographics ==
As of 2011, Naurangpur had a population of 1,239, in 212 households. This population was 52.2% male (647) and 47.8% female (592). The 0-6 age group numbered 183 (98 male and 85 female), or 14.8% of the total population. 272 residents were members of Scheduled Castes, or 22.0% of the total.

The 1981 census recorded Naurangpur as having a population of 776 people, in 139 households.

The 1961 census recorded Naurangpur as comprising one hamlet, with a total population of 605 people (317 male and 288 female), in 114 households and 82 physical houses. The area of the village was given as 538 acres.

== Infrastructure ==
As of 2011, Naurangpur had 1 primary school; it did not have any healthcare facilities. Drinking water was provided by hand pump and tube well; there were no public toilets. The village had a public library but no post office; there was at least some access to electricity for all purposes. Streets were made of both kachcha and pakka materials.
