= Bareri, Mainpuri =

Village in Uttar Pradesh, India

Bareri Baderi, Badery
- Village
- Location in Uttar Pradesh, India
- Coordinates: 27.29233°N 78.98396°E
- Country: India
- State: Uttar Pradesh
- District: Mainpuri
- Tehsil: Mainpuri

Area
  - Total: 3.431 km^{2} (1.325 sq mi)

Population (2011)
  - Total: 1,985
  - Density: 578.5/km^{2} (1,498/sq mi)
- Time zone: UTC+5:30 (IST)

Bareri (Baṛerī), also Baderi or Badery (Baḍerī), is a village in Mainpuri block of Mainpuri district, Uttar Pradesh, India. As of 2011, it had a population of 1,985, in 297 households.

== Demographics ==
As of 2011, Bareri had a population of 1,985, in 297 households. This population was 53.7% male (1,065) and 46.3% female (920). The 0-6 age group numbered 390 (206 male and 184 female), or 19.6% of the total population. 406 residents were members of Scheduled Castes, or 20.5% of the total.

The 1981 census recorded Bareri as having a population of 1,049 people, in 193 households.

The 1961 census recorded Bareri as comprising 4 hamlets, with a total population of 863 people (455 male and 408 female), in 189 households and 140 physical houses. The area of the village was given as 872 acres.

== Infrastructure ==
As of 2011, Bareri had 1 primary school; it did not have any healthcare facilities. Drinking water was provided by hand pump and tube well/borehole; there were no public toilets. The village had a post office and public library; as well as at least some access to electricity for residential and agricultural purposes. Streets were made of both kachcha and pakka materials.
