= Balrampur, Mainpuri =

Village in Uttar Pradesh, India

Balrampur
- Village
- Location in Uttar Pradesh, India
- Coordinates: 27.41901°N 78.9064°E
- Country: India
- State: Uttar Pradesh
- District: Mainpuri
- Tehsil: Mainpuri

Area
  - Total: 1.123 km^{2} (0.434 sq mi)

Population (2011)
  - Total: 964
  - Density: 858/km^{2} (2,220/sq mi)
- Time zone: UTC+5:30 (IST)

Balrampur (Balrāmpur) is a village in Kuraoli block of Mainpuri district, Uttar Pradesh. As of 2011, it has a population of 964, in 185 households.

== Demographics ==
As of 2011, Balrampur had a population of 964, in 185 households. This population was 52.7% male (508) and 47.3% female (456). The 0-6 age group numbered 159 (89 male and 70 female), or 16.5% of the total population. 31 residents were members of Scheduled Castes, or 3.2% of the total.

The 1981 census recorded Balrampur as having a population of 797 people, in 144 households.

The 1961 census recorded Balrampur as comprising 1 hamlet, with a total population of 527 people (263 male and 264 female), in 106 households and 81 physical houses. The area of the village was given as 306 acres.

== Infrastructure ==
As of 2011, Balrampur had 1 primary school; it did not have any healthcare facilities. Drinking water was provided by hand pump; there were no public toilets. The village did not have a post office or public library; there was at least some access to electricity for all purposes. Streets were made of both kachcha and pakka materials.
