= Narayanpur, Mainpuri =

Village in Uttar Pradesh, India

Narayanpur
- Village
- Location in Uttar Pradesh, India
- Coordinates: 27.33546°N 79.03105°E
- Country: India
- State: Uttar Pradesh
- District: Mainpuri
- Tehsil: Mainpuri

Area
  - Total: 4.53 km^{2} (1.75 sq mi)

Population (2011)
  - Total: 4,400
  - Density: 970/km^{2} (2,500/sq mi)
- Time zone: UTC+5:30 (IST)

Narayanpur (Nārāyanpur) is a village in Mainpuri block of Mainpuri district, Uttar Pradesh, India. As of 2011, it had a population of 4,400, in 728 households.

== Demographics ==
As of 2011, Narayanpur had a population of 4,400, in 728 households. This population was 53.9% male (2,371) and 46.1% female (2,029). The 0-6 age group numbered 625 (327 male and 298 female), or 14.2% of the total population. 347 residents were members of Scheduled Castes, or 7.9% of the total.

The 1981 census recorded Narayanpur as having a population of 2,361 people, in 374 households.

The 1961 census recorded Narayanpur as comprising 6 hamlets, with a total population of 1,561 people (855 male and 706 female), in 285 households and 200 physical houses. The area of the village was given as 1,182 acres.

== Infrastructure ==
As of 2011, Narayanpur had 3 primary schools; it did not have any healthcare facilities. Drinking water was provided by hand pump and tube well/borehole; there were no public toilets. The village had a post office and public library, as well as at least some access to electricity for all purposes. Streets were made of both kachcha and pakka materials.
