= Nanamau =

Village in Uttar Pradesh, India

- Village
- Location in Uttar Pradesh, India
- Coordinates: 27.35629°N 79.01157°E
- Country: India
- State: Uttar Pradesh
- District: Mainpuri
- Tehsil: Mainpuri

Area
  - Total: 3.931 km^{2} (1.518 sq mi)

Population (2011)
  - Total: 2,259
  - Density: 574.7/km^{2} (1,488/sq mi)
- Time zone: UTC+5:30 (IST)

Nanamau (Nānāmaū) is a village in Kuraoli block of Mainpuri district, Uttar Pradesh, India. It is located several kilometers east of Kuraoli, and there is an archaeological site just west of the village. As of 2011, it had a population of 2,259, in 365 households.

== Geography ==
Nanamau is located 6 km east of Kuraoli. There are two crescent-shaped lakes west of the village, both within 1 km. The larger one is to the southwest and the smaller one is to the south, east of the bigger one. 400 m west of the village is an archaeological mound associated with the Ochre Coloured Pottery culture. The soil in this area is hard and calcareous.

== Archaeology ==
Several pottery fragments associated with the Ochre Coloured Pottery culture have been found at the mound west of Nanamau. They were strewn over a large area, and not very many were found. Inhabitants of the ancient site probably would have used the local lakes both as a source of water and for fishing. Just to the west of the mound, there is a low-lying strip of land that "would have been easily used for agricultural purposes".

== Demographics ==
As of 2011, Nanamau had a population of 2,259, in 365 households. This population was 53.4% male (1,206) and 46.6% female (1,053). The 0-6 age group numbered 360 (195 male and 165 female), or 15.9% of the total population. 890 residents were members of Scheduled Castes, or 39.4% of the total.

The 1981 census recorded Nanamau as having a population of 1,643 people, in 246 households.

The 1961 census recorded Nanamau as comprising 2 hamlets, with a total population of 1,013 people (552 male and 461 female), in 160 households and 99 physical houses. The area of the village was given as 276 acres.

== Infrastructure ==
As of 2011, Nanamau had 1 primary school; it did not have any healthcare facilities. Drinking water was provided by hand pump and tube well; there were no public toilets. The village had a post office but no public library; there was at least some access to electricity for all purposes. Streets were made of both kachcha and pakka materials.
