= Kukamai =

Village in Uttar Pradesh, India

- Village
- Location in Uttar Pradesh, India
- Coordinates: 27.35959°N 78.95669°E
- Country: India
- State: Uttar Pradesh
- District: Mainpuri
- Tehsil: Mainpuri

Area
  - Total: 2.197 km^{2} (0.848 sq mi)

Population (2011)
  - Total: 2,233
  - Density: 1,016/km^{2} (2,632/sq mi)
- Time zone: UTC+5:30 (IST)

Kukamai (Kūkāmaī) is a village in Kuraoli block of Mainpuri district, Uttar Pradesh, India. As of 2011, it had a population of 2,233, in 341 households.

== Demographics ==
As of 2011, Kukamai had a population of 2,233, in 341 households. This population was 52.9% male (1,181) and 47.1% female (1,052). The 0-6 age group numbered 373 (187 male and 186 female), or 16.7% of the total population. 269 residents were members of Scheduled Castes, or 12.0% of the total.

The 1981 census recorded Kukamai as having a population of 1,275 people, in 207 households.

The 1961 census recorded Kukamai (as "Kuka Mai") as comprising 3 hamlets, with a total population of 963 people (528 male and 435 female), in 170 households and 114 physical houses. The area of the village was given as 544 acres.

== Infrastructure ==
As of 2011, Kukamai had 2 primary schools; it did not have any healthcare facilities. Drinking water was provided by well, hand pump, and tube well; there were no public toilets. The village had a post office but no public library; there was at least some access to electricity for all purposes. Streets were made of both kachcha and pakka materials.
