= Dulhapur =

Village in Uttar Pradesh, India

- Village
- Location in Uttar Pradesh, India
- Coordinates: 27.37495°N 78.85122°E
- Country: India
- State: Uttar Pradesh
- District: Mainpuri
- Tehsil: Mainpuri

Area
  - Total: 2.999 km^{2} (1.158 sq mi)

Population (2025)
  - Total: 1,100
  - Density: 370/km^{2} (950/sq mi)
- Time zone: UTC+5:30 (IST)

Dulhapur (Dulhāpur) is a village in Kuraoli block of Mainpuri district, Uttar Pradesh, India. As of 2011, it had a population of 1100, in 130 households.

== Demographics ==
As of 2011, Dulhapur had a population of 960, in 130 households. This population was 54.8% male (526) and 45.2% female (434). The 0-6 age group numbered 134 (77 male and 57 female), or 14.0% of the total population. No residents were members of Scheduled Castes.

The 1981 census recorded Dulhapur as having a population of 566 people, in 89 households.

The 1961 census recorded Dulhapur as comprising 2 hamlets, with a total population of 411 people (217 male and 194 female), in 58 households and 40 physical houses. The area of the village was given as 742 acres.

== Infrastructure ==
As of 2011, Dulhapur had 1 primary school; it did not have any healthcare facilities. Drinking water was provided by hand pump; there were no public toilets. The village had a post office but no public library; there was at least some access to electricity for residential and agricultural purposes. Streets were made of pakka materials.
