= Sharifpur =

Village in Uttar Pradesh, India

- Village
- Location in Uttar Pradesh, India
- Coordinates: 27.44297°N 78.88568°E
- Country: India
- State: Uttar Pradesh
- District: Mainpuri
- Tehsil: Mainpuri

Area
  - Total: 2.354 km^{2} (0.909 sq mi)

Population (2011)
  - Total: 2,938
  - Density: 1,248/km^{2} (3,233/sq mi)
- Time zone: UTC+5:30 (IST)
- PIN: 205265

Sharifpur (Śarīphpur) is a village in Kuraoli block of Mainpuri district, Uttar Pradesh, India. As of 2011, it had a population of 2,938, in 503 households.

== Demographics ==
As of 2011, Sharifpur had a population of 2,938, in 503 households. This population was 54.0% male (1,586) and 46.0% female (1,352). The 0-6 age group numbered 435 (240 male and 195 female), or 14.8% of the total population. 719 residents were members of Scheduled Castes, or 24.5% of the total.

The 1981 census recorded Sharifpur as having a population of 2,084 people, in 345 households.

The 1961 census recorded Sharifpur as comprising 3 hamlets, with a total population of 1,326 people (722 male and 604 female), in 238 households and 228 physical houses. The area of the village was given as 598 acres.

== Infrastructure ==
As of 2011, Sharifpur had 2 primary schools; it did not have any healthcare facilities. Drinking water was provided by well and hand pump; there were no public toilets. The village had a post office but no public library; there was at least some access to electricity for all purposes. Streets were made of pakka materials.
