= Naugaon, Mainpuri =

Village in Uttar Pradesh, India

Naugaon
- Village
- Location in Uttar Pradesh, India
- Coordinates: 27.32691°N 78.9746°E
- Country: India
- State: Uttar Pradesh
- District: Mainpuri
- Tehsil: Mainpuri

Area
  - Total: 7.097 km^{2} (2.740 sq mi)

Population (2011)
  - Total: 3,655
  - Density: 515.0/km^{2} (1,334/sq mi)
- Time zone: UTC+5:30 (IST)

Naugaon (Naugā̃v) is a village in Kuraoli block of Mainpuri district, Uttar Pradesh. As of 2011, it has a population of 3,655, in 599 households.

== Demographics ==
As of 2011, Naugaon had a population of 3,655, in 599 households. This population was 52.6% male (1,923) and 47.4% female (1,732). The 0-6 age group numbered 556 (292 male and 264 female), or 15.2% of the total population. 584 residents were members of Scheduled Castes, or 16.0% of the total.

The 1981 census recorded Naugaon as having a population of 2,237 people, in 368 households.

The 1961 census recorded Naugaon as comprising 6 hamlets, with a total population of 1,687 people (903 male and 784 female), in 317 households and 233 physical houses. The area of the village was given as 1,798 acres and it had a post office at that point.

== Infrastructure ==
As of 2024, Naugaon had 2 primary schools and 1 Junior Highschool; it did not have any healthcare facilities. Drinking water was provided by well, hand pump, and tube well; there are public toilets under government scheme. The village had a post office but no public library; there was at least some access to electricity for residential and agricultural purposes. Streets were made of both kachcha and pakka materials.

Naugaon is connected to Kuraoli, Mainpuri and Jyoti by road. There is no public transport available to the village. Most of residents of village are associated to agriculture.
