= Nagla Usar =

Village in Uttar Pradesh, India

- Village
- Location in Uttar Pradesh, India
- Coordinates: 27.37079°N 79.01631°E
- Country: India
- State: Uttar Pradesh
- District: Mainpuri
- Tehsil: Mainpuri

Area
  - Total: 1.197 km^{2} (0.462 sq mi)

Population (2011)
  - Total: 1,473
  - Density: 1,231/km^{2} (3,187/sq mi)
- Time zone: UTC+5:30 (IST)

Nagla Usar (Naglā Ūsar) is a village in Kuraoli block of Mainpuri district, Uttar Pradesh, India. As of 2011, it had a population of 1,473, in 228 households.

== Demographics ==
As of 2011, Nagla Usar had a population of 1,473, in 228 households. This population was 53.0% male (781) and 47.0% female (692). The 0-6 age group numbered 354 (181 male and 173 female), or 24.0% of the total population. 1,468 residents were members of Scheduled Castes, or 99.7% of the total.

The 1981 census recorded Nagla Usar as having a population of 499 people, in 74 households.

== Infrastructure ==
As of 2011, Nagla Usar had 1 primary school; it did not have any healthcare facilities. Drinking water was provided by hand pump; there were no public toilets. The village did not have a post office or public library; there was at least some access to electricity for all purposes. Streets were made of both kachcha and pakka materials.
