= Tarauli, Mainpuri =

Village in Uttar Pradesh, India

Tarauli
- Village
- Location in Uttar Pradesh, India
- Coordinates: 27.34623°N 78.97038°E
- Country: India
- State: Uttar Pradesh
- District: Mainpuri
- Tehsil: Mainpuri

Area
  - Total: 2.173 km^{2} (0.839 sq mi)

Population (2011)
  - Total: 1,038
  - Density: 477.7/km^{2} (1,237/sq mi)
- Time zone: UTC+5:30 (IST)

Tarauli (Taraulī) is a village in Kuraoli block of Mainpuri district, Uttar Pradesh. As of 2011, it has a population of 1,038, in 161 households.

== Demographics ==
As of 2011, Tarauli had a population of 1,038, in 161 households. This population was 51.4% male (534) and 48.6% female (504). The 0-6 age group numbered 158 (79 male and 79 female), or 15.2% of the total population. 171 residents were members of Scheduled Castes, or 16.5% of the total.

The 1981 census recorded Tarauli as having a population of 793 people, in 123 households.

The 1961 census recorded Tarauli as comprising 3 hamlets, with a total population of 622 people (333 male and 289 female), in 117 households and 97 physical houses. The area of the village was given as 539 acres.

== Infrastructure ==
As of 2011, Tarauli had 1 primary school; it did not have any healthcare facilities. Drinking water was provided by well, hand pump, and tube well; there were no public toilets. The village had a post office but no public library; there was at least some access to electricity for all purposes. Streets were made of both kachcha and pakka materials.
