= Barauliya, Mainpuri =

Village in Uttar Pradesh, India

Barauliya
- Village
- Location in Uttar Pradesh, India
- Coordinates: 27.43533°N 78.93422°E
- Country: India
- State: Uttar Pradesh
- District: Mainpuri
- Tehsil: Mainpuri

Area
  - Total: 1.151 km^{2} (0.444 sq mi)

Population (2011)
  - Total: 1,133
  - Density: 984.4/km^{2} (2,549/sq mi)
- Time zone: UTC+5:30 (IST)

Barauliya (Barauliyā) is a village in Kuraoli block of Mainpuri district, Uttar Pradesh, India. As of 2011, it had a population of 1,133, in 208 households.

== Demographics ==
As of 2011, Barauliya had a population of 1,133, in 208 households. This population was 54.4% male (616) and 45.6% female (517). The 0-6 age group numbered 200 (114 male and 86 female), or 17.7% of the total population. 105 residents were members of Scheduled Castes, or 20.3% of the total.

The 1981 census recorded Barauliya as having a population of 891 people, in 154 households.

The 1961 census recorded Barauliya as comprising 1 hamlet, with a total population of 607 people (332 male and 275 female), in 112 households and 77 physical houses. The area of the village was given as 291 acres.

== Infrastructure ==
As of 2011, Barauliya had 1 primary school; it did not have any healthcare facilities. Drinking water was provided by hand pump; there were no public toilets. The village did not have a post office or public library; there was at least some access to electricity for all purposes. Streets were made of both kachcha and pakka materials.
