= Ratibhanpur =

Village in Uttar Pradesh, India

- Village
- Location in Uttar Pradesh, India
- Coordinates: 27.10779°N 78.97267°E
- Country: India
- State: Uttar Pradesh
- District: Mainpuri
- Tehsil: Mainpuri

Area
  - Total: 12.435 km^{2} (4.801 sq mi)

Population (2011)
  - Total: 6,942
  - Density: 558.3/km^{2} (1,446/sq mi)
- Time zone: UTC+5:30 (IST)

Ratibhanpur (Ratibhānpur), also spelled as two words, Rati Bhanpur (Rati Bhānpur), is a village in Mainpuri block of Mainpuri district, Uttar Pradesh. As of 2011, it had a population of 6,942, in 1,152 households.

== Demographics ==
As of 2011, Ratibhanpur had a population of 6,942, in 1,152 households. This population was 53.1% male (3,689) and 46.9% female (3,253). The 0-6 age group numbered 1,171 (605 male and 566 female), or 16.9% of the total population. 1,668 residents were members of Scheduled Castes, or 24.0% of the total.

The 1981 census recorded Ratibhanpur (spelled as two words in English and as one word in Devanagari) as having a population of 3,444 people, in 584 households.

The 1961 census recorded Ratibhanpur as comprising 6 hamlets, with a total population of 2,344 people (1,258 male and 1,086 female), in 439 households and 328 physical houses. The area of the village was given as 3,084 acres.

== Infrastructure ==
As of 2011, Ratibhanpur had 2 primary schools; it did not have any healthcare facilities. Drinking water was provided by well and hand pump; there were no public toilets. The village had a post office but no public library; there was at least some access to electricity for all purposes. Streets were made of both kachcha and pakka materials.
