= Barkhera, Mainpuri =

Village in Uttar Pradesh, India

Barkhera
- Village
- Location in Uttar Pradesh, India
- Coordinates: 27.40472°N 78.90893°E
- Country: India
- State: Uttar Pradesh
- District: Mainpuri
- Tehsil: Mainpuri

Area
  - Total: 1.461 km^{2} (0.564 sq mi)

Population (2011)
  - Total: 884
  - Density: 605/km^{2} (1,570/sq mi)
- Time zone: UTC+5:30 (IST)
- PIN: 205265

Barkhera (Barkheṛā) is a village in Kuraoli block of Mainpuri district, Uttar Pradesh, India. There is a prominent jhil near the village site. As of 2011, Barkhera had a population of 884, in 156 households.

== Geography ==
There is a prominent jhil at Barkhera.

== Demographics ==
As of 2011, Barkhera had a population of 884, in 156 households. This population was 50.9% male (450) and 49.1% female (434). The 0-6 age group numbered 145 (74 male and 71 female), or 16.4% of the total population. 350 residents were members of Scheduled Castes, or 39.6% of the total.

The 1981 census recorded Barkhera as having a population of 628 people, in 117 households.

The 1961 census recorded Barkhera as comprising 2 hamlets, with a total population of 513 people (271 male and 242 female), in 96 households and 81 physical houses. The area of the village was given as 357 acres.

== Infrastructure ==
As of 2011, Barkhera had 1 primary school; it did not have any healthcare facilities. Drinking water was provided by hand pump; there were no public toilets. The village did not have a post office or public library; there was at least some access to electricity for all purposes. Streets were made of both kachcha and pakka materials.
