= Jichauli =

Village in Uttar Pradesh, India

- Village
- Location in Uttar Pradesh, India
- Coordinates: 27.16768°N 78.90825°E
- Country: India
- State: Uttar Pradesh
- District: Mainpuri
- Tehsil: Mainpuri

Area
  - Total: 1.131 km^{2} (0.437 sq mi)

Population (2011)
  - Total: 181
  - Density: 160/km^{2} (414/sq mi)
- Time zone: UTC+5:30 (IST)

Jichauli (Jichaulī) is a village in Mainpuri block of Mainpuri district, Uttar Pradesh. As of 2011, it has a population of 181, in 29 households.

== Demographics ==
As of 2011, Jichauli had a population of 181, in 29 households. This population was 54.7% male (99) and 45.3% female (82). The 0-6 age group numbered 34 (19 male and 15 female), or 18.8% of the total population. 81 residents were members of Scheduled Castes, or 44.8% of the total.

The 1981 census recorded Jichauli as having a population of 97 people, in 17 households.

The 1961 census recorded Jichauli as comprising 1 hamlet, with a total population of 71 people (40 male and 31 female), in 14 households and 10 physical houses. The area of the village was given as 280 acres.

== Infrastructure ==
As of 2011, Jichauli did not have any schools or healthcare facilities. Drinking water was provided by well, hand pump, and tube well; there were no public toilets. The village had a post office but no public library; there was at least some access to electricity for all purposes. Streets were made of both kachcha and pakka materials.
