= Sathni Dalippur =

Village in Uttar Pradesh, India

- Village
- Location in Uttar Pradesh, India
- Coordinates: 27.19737°N 78.98566°E
- Country: India
- State: Uttar Pradesh
- District: Mainpuri
- Tehsil: Mainpuri

Area
  - Total: 5.723 km^{2} (2.210 sq mi)

Population (2011)
  - Total: 1,663
  - Density: 290.6/km^{2} (752.6/sq mi)
- Time zone: UTC+5:30 (IST)

Sathni Dalippur (Sathnī Dalīppur) is a village in Mainpuri block of Mainpuri district, Uttar Pradesh. As of 2011, it has a population of 1,663, in 285 households.

== Demographics ==
As of 2011, Sathni Dalippur had a population of 1,663, in 285 households. This population was 52.6% male (874) and 47.4% female (789). The 0-6 age group numbered 284 (155 male and 129 female), or 17.1% of the total population. 489 residents were members of Scheduled Castes, or 29.4% of the total.

The 1981 census recorded Sathni Dalippur as having a population of 981 people, in 163 households.

The 1961 census recorded Sathni Dalippur as comprising 5 hamlets, with a total population of 809 people (438 male and 371 female), in 136 households and 113 physical houses. The area of the village was given as 1,433 acres.

== Infrastructure ==
As of 2011, Sathni Dalippur had 1 primary school; it did not have any healthcare facilities. Drinking water was provided by well, hand pump, and tube well; there were no public toilets. The village had a public library but no post office; there was at least some access to electricity for all purposes. Streets were made of both kachcha and pakka materials.
