= Bhagpur =

Village in Uttar Pradesh, India

- Village
- Location in Uttar Pradesh, India
- Coordinates: 27.15468°N 78.96941°E
- Country: India
- State: Uttar Pradesh
- District: Mainpuri
- Tehsil: Mainpuri

Area
  - Total: 0.75 km^{2} (0.29 sq mi)

Population (2011)
  - Total: 679
  - Density: 910/km^{2} (2,300/sq mi)
- Time zone: UTC+5:30 (IST)

Bhagpur (Bhāgpur) is a village in Mainpuri block of Mainpuri district, Uttar Pradesh. As of 2011, it has a population of 679, in 119 households.

== Demographics ==
As of 2011, Bhagpur had a population of 679, in 119 households. This population was 54.9% male (373) and 45.1% female (306). The 0-6 age group numbered 95 (55 male and 40 female), or 14.0% of the total population. 154 residents were members of Scheduled Castes, or 22.7% of the total.

The 1981 census recorded Bhagpur as having a population of 378 people, in 71 households.

The 1961 census recorded Bhagpur as comprising 1 hamlet, with a total population of 228 people (117 male and 111 female), in 43 households and 27 physical houses. The area of the village was given as 236 acres.

== Infrastructure ==
As of 2011, Bhagpur had 2 primary schools; it did not have any healthcare facilities. Drinking water was provided by well, hand pump, and tube well; there were no public toilets. The village had a post office but no public library; there was at least some access to electricity for all purposes. Streets were made of kachcha materials.
