= Bikrampur, Mainpuri =

Village in Uttar Pradesh, India

Bikrampur
- Village
- Location in Uttar Pradesh, India
- Coordinates: 27.3896°N 78.9545°E
- Country: India
- State: Uttar Pradesh
- District: Mainpuri
- Tehsil: Mainpuri

Area
  - Total: 4.078 km^{2} (1.575 sq mi)

Population (2011)
  - Total: 491
  - Density: 120/km^{2} (312/sq mi)
- Time zone: UTC+5:30 (IST)
- PIN: 205121

Bikrampur (Bikrampur) is a village in Kuraoli block of Mainpuri district, Uttar Pradesh, India. As of 2011, it had a population of 491, in 82 households.

== Demographics ==
As of 2011, Bikrampur had a population of 491, in 82 households. This population was 53.4% male (262) and 46.6% female (229). The 0-6 age group numbered 71 (29 male and 42 female), or 14.5% of the total population. A total of 246 residents were members of Scheduled Castes, making up 50.1% of the population.

The 1981 census recorded Bikrampur as having a population of 295 people, in 45 households.

The 1961 census recorded Bikrampur as comprising two hamlets, with a total population of 193 people (112 male and 81 female), in 35 households and 20 physical houses. The area of the village was reported to be 185 acres.

== Infrastructure ==
As of 2011, Bikrampur had one primary school but no healthcare facilities. Drinking water was provided by hand pump, and there were no public toilets. The village had a post office but no public library, although there was some access to electricity for residential and agricultural purposes. The streets were made of both kachcha and pakka materials.
