= Fatehjangpur =

Village in Uttar Pradesh, India

- Village
- Location in Uttar Pradesh, India
- Coordinates: 27.40011°N 78.98034°E
- Country: India
- State: Uttar Pradesh
- District: Mainpuri
- Tehsil: Mainpuri

Area
  - Total: 1.176 km^{2} (0.454 sq mi)

Population (2011)
  - Total: 1,311
  - Density: 1,115/km^{2} (2,887/sq mi)
- Time zone: UTC+5:30 (IST)

Fatehjangpur (Fatehjaṅgpur) is a village in Kuraoli block of Mainpuri district, Uttar Pradesh. As of 2011, it had a population of 1,311, in 232 households.

== Demographics ==
As of 2011, Fatehjangpur had a population of 1,311, in 232 households. This population was 54.1% male (709) and 45.9% female (602). The 0-6 age group numbered 172 (102 male and 70 female), or 13.1% of the total population. 102 residents were members of Scheduled Castes, or 7.8% of the total.

The 1981 census recorded Fatehjangpur as having a population of 821 people, in 140 households.

The 1961 census recorded Fatehjangpur (as "Fatehganjpur") as comprising 1 hamlet, with a total population of 587 people (303 male and 284 female), in 94 households and 84 physical houses. The area of the village was given as 292 acres.

== Infrastructure ==
As of 2011, Fatehjangpur had 1 primary school; it did not have any healthcare facilities. Drinking water was provided by hand pump; there were no public toilets. The village had a post office but no public library; there was at least some access to electricity for all purposes. Streets were made of both kachcha and pakka materials.
