= Firozpur, Mainpuri =

Village in Uttar Pradesh, India

Firozpur
- Village
- Location in Uttar Pradesh, India
- Coordinates: 27.41414°N 79.00701°E
- Country: India
- State: Uttar Pradesh
- District: Mainpuri
- Tehsil: Mainpuri

Area
  - Total: 0.348 km^{2} (0.134 sq mi)

Population (2011)
  - Total: 247
  - Density: 710/km^{2} (1,840/sq mi)
- Time zone: UTC+5:30 (IST)
- PIN: 205265

Firozpur (Firozpur) is a village in Kuraoli block of Mainpuri district, Uttar Pradesh. As of 2011, it has a population of 247, in 36 households.

== Demographics ==
As of 2011, Firozpur had a population of 247, in 36 households. This population was 43.7% male (108) and 56.3% female (139). The 0-6 age group numbered 41 (16 male and 25 female), or 16.6% of the total population. 10 residents were members of Scheduled Castes, or 4.0% of the total.

The 1981 census recorded Firozpur as having a population of 135 people, in 18 households.

The 1961 census recorded Firozpur as comprising 1 hamlet, with a total population of 86 people (44 male and 42 female), in 17 households and 12 physical houses. The area of the village was given as 90 acres.

== Infrastructure ==
As of 2011, Firozpur did not have any schools or healthcare facilities. Drinking water was provided by well and hand pump; there were no public toilets. The village had a post office but no public library; there was at least some access to electricity for all purposes. Streets were made of pakka materials.
