= Jagruppur =

Village in Uttar Pradesh, India

- Village
- Location in Uttar Pradesh, India
- Coordinates: 27.25625°N 79.05454°E
- Country: India
- State: Uttar Pradesh
- District: Mainpuri
- Tehsil: Mainpuri

Area
  - Total: 0.941 km^{2} (0.363 sq mi)

Population (2011)
  - Total: 1,357
  - Density: 1,440/km^{2} (3,730/sq mi)
- Time zone: UTC+5:30 (IST)
- PIN: 205001

Jagruppur (Jagrūppur) is a village in Mainpuri block of Mainpuri district, Uttar Pradesh, India. As of 2011, it had a population of 1,357, in 201 households.

== Demographics ==
As of 2011, Jagruppur had a population of 1,357, in 201 households. This population was 52.6% male (714) and 47.4% female (643). The 0-6 age group numbered 215 (99 male and 116 female), or 15.8% of the total population. 491 residents were members of Scheduled Castes, or 36.2% of the total.

The 1981 census recorded Jagruppur as having a population of 740 people, in 143 households.

The 1961 census recorded Jagruppur as comprising 2 hamlets, with a total population of 553 people (309 male and 244 female), in 110 households and 99 physical houses. The area of the village was given as 238 acres.

== Infrastructure ==
As of 2011, Jagruppur had 1 primary school; it did not have any healthcare facilities. Drinking water was provided by hand pump and tube well; there were no public toilets. The village had a post office but no public library; there was at least some access to electricity for all purposes. Streets were made of both kachcha and pakka materials.
