= Rasemar =

Village in Uttar Pradesh, India

- Village
- Location in Uttar Pradesh, India
- Coordinates: 27.35803°N 78.99323°E
- Country: India
- State: Uttar Pradesh
- District: Mainpuri
- Tehsil: Mainpuri

Area
  - Total: 4.234 km^{2} (1.635 sq mi)

Population (2011)
  - Total: 1,351
  - Density: 319.1/km^{2} (826.4/sq mi)
- Time zone: UTC+5:30 (IST)

Rasemar is a village in Kuraoli block of Mainpuri district, Uttar Pradesh. As of 2011, Rasemar had a population of 1,351, in 235 households.

== Geography ==
There is a prominent jhil at Rasemar.

== Demographics ==
As of 2011, Rasemar had a population of 1,351, living in 235 households. The population was 53.0% male (716) and 47.0% female (635). The 0-6 age group numbered 204 (120 male and 84 female), accounting for 15.1% of the total population. Of the residents, 233 were members of Scheduled Castes, which made up 17.2% of the total population.

The 1981 census recorded Rasemar as having a population of 712 people, in 125 households.

The 1961 census recorded Rasemar as comprising 1 hamlet, with a total population of 419 people (218 male and 201 female), in 73 households and 58 physical houses. The area of the village was given as 826 acres.

== Infrastructure ==
As of 2011, Rasemar had 1 primary school; it did not have any healthcare facilities. Drinking water was provided by hand pump; there were no public toilets. The village had a post office and public library, as well as at least some access to electricity for all purposes. Streets were made of both kachcha and pakka materials.
