= Devinagar, Mainpuri =

Village in Uttar Pradesh, India

Devinagar
- Village
- Location in Uttar Pradesh, India
- Coordinates: 27.41529°N 78.96052°E
- Country: India
- State: Uttar Pradesh
- District: Mainpuri
- Tehsil: Mainpuri

Area
  - Total: 0.841 km^{2} (0.325 sq mi)

Population (2011)
  - Total: 1,675
  - Density: 1,990/km^{2} (5,160/sq mi)
- Time zone: UTC+5:30 (IST)
- PIN: 205265

Devinagar (Devīnagar) is a village in Kuraoli block of Mainpuri district, Uttar Pradesh, India. As of 2011, it had a population of 1,675, in 266 households.

== Demographics ==
As of 2011, Devinagar had a population of 1,675, in 266 households. This population was 52.2% male (875) and 47.8% female (800). The 0-6 age group numbered 300 (142 male and 158 female), or 17.9% of the total population. 462 residents were members of Scheduled Castes, or 27.6% of the total.

The 1981 census recorded Devinagar as having a population of 1,170 people, in 189 households.

The 1961 census recorded Devinagar as comprising 1 hamlet, with a total population of 742 people (376 male and 366 female), in 148 households and 113 physical houses. The area of the village was given as 211 acres.

== Infrastructure ==
As of 2011, Devinagar had 1 primary school; it did not have any healthcare facilities. Drinking water was provided by hand pump; there were no public toilets. The village did not have a post office or public library; there was at least some access to electricity for all purposes. Streets were made of pakka materials.
