= Timanpur =

Village in Uttar Pradesh, India

- Village
- Location in Uttar Pradesh, India
- Coordinates: 27.45816°N 78.89917°E
- Country: India
- State: Uttar Pradesh
- District: Mainpuri
- Tehsil: Mainpuri

Area
  - Total: 4.492 km^{2} (1.734 sq mi)

Population (2011)
  - Total: 3,948
  - Density: 878.9/km^{2} (2,276/sq mi)
- Time zone: UTC+5:30 (IST)

Timanpur is a village in Kuraoli block of Mainpuri district, Uttar Pradesh. As of 2011, it had a population of 3,948, in 676 households.

== Demographics ==
As of 2011, Timanpur had a population of 3,948, in 676 households. This population was 53.2% male (2,101) and 46.8% female (1,847). The 0-6 age group numbered 745 (388 male and 357 female), or 18.9% of the total population. 386 residents were members of Scheduled Castes, or 9.8% of the total.

The 1981 census recorded Timanpur as having a population of 2,143 people, in 429 households.

The 1961 census recorded Timanpur as comprising 3 hamlets, with a total population of 1,674 people (899 male and 775 female), in 320 households and 291 physical houses. The area of the village was given as 1,113 acres.

== Infrastructure ==
As of 2011, Timanpur had 1 primary school; it did not have any healthcare facilities. Drinking water was provided by well and hand pump; there were no public toilets. The village had a post office but no public library; there was at least some access to electricity for all purposes. Streets were made of both kachcha and pakka materials.
