= Mainpuri Kachehri railway station =

Railway station in Uttar Pradesh, India

General information
- Location: Mainpuri Kachri, Mainpuri, Uttar Pradesh; India
- Coordinates: 27.2242°N 79.0574°E
- Elevation: 161 metres (528 ft)
- System: Indian Railways station
- Owner: Indian Railways
- Operator: North Central Railway
- Line: Mainpuri–Farrukhabad branch line
- Platforms: 1
- Tracks: 2
- Connections: Auto stand

Construction
- Structure type: Standard (on-ground station)
- Parking: No
- Cycle facilities: No

Other information
- Status: Double electric line
- Station code: MPUE
- Zone(s): North Central Railway
- Division(s): Allahabad

Services
Preceding station	Indian Railways	Following station
Mainpuri towards ?	North Central Railway zone Mainpuri–Farrukhabad branch line	Bhongaon towards ?
Location
- Location within India Location within Uttar Pradesh

Mainpuri Kachehri railway station is a small railway station in Mainpuri district, Uttar Pradesh. Its code is MPUE. It serves Jabalpur city. The station consists of a single platform. The platform is not well sheltered. It lacks many facilities including water and sanitation.
