= Panwah =

Village in Uttar Pradesh, India

- Village
- Location in Uttar Pradesh, India
- Coordinates: 27.4187°N 78.87048°E
- Country: India
- State: Uttar Pradesh
- District: Mainpuri
- Tehsil: Mainpuri

Area
  - Total: 9.773 km^{2} (3.773 sq mi)

Population (2011)
  - Total: 2,955
  - Density: 302.4/km^{2} (783.1/sq mi)
- Time zone: UTC+5:30 (IST)

Panwah (Panwāh) is a village in Kuraoli block of Mainpuri district, Uttar Pradesh, India. It is located west of Kuraoli. There is a large depression near the village that used to be a lake. There is also an archaeological find site near the village. As of 2011, Panwah had a population of 2,955, in 500 households.

== Geography ==
Panwah is located 15 km west of Kuraoli. 1 km east of Panwah is a mound where Ochre Coloured Pottery culture artifacts have been found. The soil in this area is hard and calcareous. To the south is a large depression that used to be a lake. It dried up after a canal was constructed, interrupting the drainage path that used to feed the lake.

== Archaeology ==
Several pottery fragments associated with the Ochre Coloured Pottery culture have been found at the mound near Panwah. They were strewn over a large area, and not very many were found. The inhabitants of the ancient site probably used the drainage zone around the former lake for agriculture.

== Demographics ==
As of 2011, Panwah had a population of 2,955, in 500 households. This population was 52.4% male (1,548) and 47.6% female (1,407). The 0-6 age group numbered 571 (288 male and 283 female), or 19.3% of the total population. 210 residents were members of Scheduled Castes, or 7.1% of the total.

The 1981 census recorded Panwah as having a population of 1,720 people, in 278 households.

The 1961 census recorded Panwah as comprising 3 hamlets, with a total population of 1,056 people (572 male and 484 female), in 183 households and 151 physical houses. The area of the village was given as 550 acres.

== Infrastructure ==
As of 2011, Panwah had 1 primary school and 1 primary health centre. Drinking water was provided by hand pump; there were no public toilets. The village had a post office but no public library; there was at least some access to electricity for all purposes. Streets were made of both kachcha and pakka materials.
