= Sonai, Mainpuri =

Village in Uttar Pradesh, India

Sonai
- Village
- Location in Uttar Pradesh, India
- Coordinates: 27.35766°N 78.91948°E
- Country: India
- State: Uttar Pradesh
- District: Mainpuri
- Tehsil: Mainpuri

Area
  - Total: 9.259 km^{2} (3.575 sq mi)

Population (2011)
  - Total: 4,355
  - Density: 470.4/km^{2} (1,218/sq mi)
- Time zone: UTC+5:30 (IST)
- PIN: 205265

Sonai (Sonaī) is a village in Kuraoli block of Mainpuri district, Uttar Pradesh, India. As of 2011, it had a population of 4,355, in 711 households.

== Demographics ==
As of 2011, Sonai had a population of 4,355, in 711 households. This population was 53.8% male (2,341) and 46.2% female (2,014). The 0-6 age group numbered 714 (385 male and 329 female), or 16.4% of the total population. 1,000 residents were members of Scheduled Castes, or 23.0% of the total.

The 1981 census recorded Sonai as having a population of 2,681 people, in 495 households.

The 1961 census recorded Sonai as comprising 4 hamlets, with a total population of 1,998 people (1,072 male and 926 female), in 390 households and 285 physical houses. The area of the village was given as 2,310 acres and it had a post office at that point.

== Infrastructure ==
As of 2011, Sonai had 2 primary schools. Drinking water was provided by hand pump; there were no public toilets. The village had a post office but no public library; there was at least some access to electricity for all purposes. Streets were made of both kachcha and pakka materials.
