= Kakan, Mainpuri =

Village in Uttar Pradesh, India

Kakan
- Village
- Location in Uttar Pradesh, India
- Coordinates: 27.13429°N 78.99275°E
- Country: India
- State: Uttar Pradesh
- District: Mainpuri
- Tehsil: Mainpuri

Area
  - Total: 13.711 km^{2} (5.294 sq mi)

Population (2011)
  - Total: 5,040
  - Density: 368/km^{2} (952/sq mi)
- Time zone: UTC+5:30 (IST)

Kakan (Kākan), also spelled Kankan, is a village in Mainpuri block of Mainpuri district, Uttar Pradesh, India. As of 2011, it has a population of 5,040, in 868 households.

== Geography ==
Kakan is located about 11 km south of Mainpuri, just east of the highway to Etawah. The main village site is partly located on top of a high mound that is visible from a long way off. There is a prominent jhil on village lands.

== History ==
At the turn of the 20th century, Kakan was described as comprising five hamlets. One was Daulatpur, which then held two fairs annually – one in honour of Shiva and the other in honour of Rama. There was a large tank in the village that was used for irrigation, and there was also a school. The total population as of 1901 was 2,337.

== Demographics ==
As of 2011, Kakan had a population of 5,040, in 868 households. This population was 52.7% male (2,657) and 47.3% female (2,383). The 0-6 age group numbered 701 (376 male and 325 female), or 13.9% of the total population. 1,001 residents were members of Scheduled Castes, or 19.9% of the total.

The 1981 census recorded Kakan as having a population of 3,559 people, in 622 households.

The 1961 census recorded Kakan (as "Kankan") as comprising 7 hamlets, with a total population of 2,755 people (1,376 male and 1,379 female), in 576 households and 349 physical houses. The area of the village was given as 3,395 acres and it had a post office at that point.

== Infrastructure ==
As of 2011, Kakan had 1 primary school; it did not have any healthcare facilities. Drinking water was provided by tap, hand pump, and tube well; there were no public toilets. The village had a post office but no public library; there was at least some access to electricity for all purposes. Streets were made of both kachcha and pakka materials.
