= Kichaura =

Village in Uttar Pradesh, India

- Village
- Location in Uttar Pradesh, India
- Coordinates: 27.30756°N 78.95445°E
- Country: India
- State: Uttar Pradesh
- District: Mainpuri
- Tehsil: Mainpuri

Area
  - Total: 1.513 km^{2} (0.584 sq mi)

Population (2011)
  - Total: 920
  - Density: 610/km^{2} (1,600/sq mi)
- Time zone: UTC+5:30 (IST)

Kichaura (Kichaurā) is a village in Kuraoli block of Mainpuri district, Uttar Pradesh. As of 2011, it has a population of 920, in 145 households.

== Demographics ==
As of 2011, Kichaura had a population of 920, in 145 households. This population was 53.5% male (492) and 46.5% female (428). The 0-6 age group numbered 143 (78 male and 65 female), or 15.5% of the total population. 307 residents were members of Scheduled Castes, or 33.4% of the total.

The 1981 census recorded Kichaura as having a population of 543 people, in 91 households.

The 1961 census recorded Kichaura as comprising 3 hamlets, with a total population of 421 people (222 male and 199 female), in 84 households and 59 physical houses. The area of the village was given as 376 acres.

== Infrastructure ==
As of 2011, Kichaura had 2 primary schools; it did not have any healthcare facilities. Drinking water was provided by hand pump and tube well; there were no public toilets. The village had a post office but no public library; there was at least some access to electricity for residential and agricultural purposes. Streets were made of pakka materials.
