= Dahipagar =

Village in Uttar Pradesh, India

- Village
- Location in Uttar Pradesh, India
- Coordinates: 27.40499°N 78.91951°E
- Country: India
- State: Uttar Pradesh
- District: Mainpuri
- Tehsil: Mainpuri

Area
  - Total: 1.237 km^{2} (0.478 sq mi)

Population (2011)
  - Total: 389
  - Density: 314/km^{2} (814/sq mi)
- Time zone: UTC+5:30 (IST)
- PIN: 205265

Dahipagar (Dahipagar), also spelled Dahi Pagar, is a village in Kuraoli block of Mainpuri district, Uttar Pradesh, India. As of 2011, it had a population of 389, in 59 households.

== Demographics ==
As of 2011, Dahipagar had a population of 389, in 59 households. This population was 54.8% male (213) and 45.2% female (176). The 0-6 age group numbered 54 (33 male and 21 female), or 13.9% of the total population. 56 residents were members of Scheduled Castes, or 14.4% of the total.

The 1981 census recorded Dahipagar as having a population of 288 people, in 50 households.

The 1961 census recorded Dahipagar as comprising 1 hamlet, with a total population of 234 people (136 male and 98 female), in 40 households and 32 physical houses. The area of the village was given as 315 acres.

== Infrastructure ==
As of 2011, Dahipagar did not have any schools or healthcare facilities. Drinking water was provided by hand pump; there were no public toilets. The village had a post office but no public library; there was at least some access to electricity for all purposes. Streets were made of kachcha materials.
