= Madhkarpur =

Village in Uttar Pradesh, India

- Village
- Location in Uttar Pradesh, India
- Coordinates: 27.42561°N 78.9312°E
- Country: India
- State: Uttar Pradesh
- District: Mainpuri
- Tehsil: Mainpuri

Area
  - Total: 1.139 km^{2} (0.440 sq mi)

Population (2011)
  - Total: 412
  - Density: 362/km^{2} (937/sq mi)
- Time zone: UTC+5:30 (IST)

Madhkarpur (Madhkarpur) is a village in Kuraoli block of Mainpuri district, Uttar Pradesh. As of 2011, it has a population of 412, in 73 households.

== Demographics ==
As of 2011, Madhkarpur had a population of 412, in 73 households. This population was 47.1% male (194) and 52.9% female (218). The 0-6 age group numbered 58 (25 male and 33 female), or 14.1% of the total population. 68 residents were members of Scheduled Castes, or 16.5% of the total.

The 1981 census recorded Madhkarpur as having a population of 245 people, in 45 households.

The 1961 census recorded Madhkarpur as comprising 1 hamlet, with a total population of 186 people (96 male and 90 female), in 32 households and 30 physical houses. The area of the village was given as 281 acres.

== Infrastructure ==
As of 2011, Madhkarpur had 1 primary school; it did not have any healthcare facilities. Drinking water was provided by hand pump; there were no public toilets. The village had a post office but no public library; there was at least some access to electricity for all purposes. Streets were made of both kachcha and pakka materials.
