= Harchandpur, Mainpuri =

Village in Uttar Pradesh, India

Harchandpur
- Village
- Location in Uttar Pradesh, India
- Coordinates: 27.28096°N 78.96913°E
- Country: India
- State: Uttar Pradesh
- District: Mainpuri
- Tehsil: Mainpuri

Area
  - Total: 1.291 km^{2} (0.498 sq mi)

Population (2011)
  - Total: 1,127
  - Density: 873.0/km^{2} (2,261/sq mi)
- Time zone: UTC+5:30 (IST)

Harchandpur (Harchandpur) is a village in Mainpuri block of Mainpuri district, Uttar Pradesh, India. As of 2011, it had a population of 1,127, in 179 households.

== Demographics ==
As of 2011, Harchandpur had a population of 1,127, in 179 households. This population was 53.3% male (601) and 46.7% female (526). The 0-6 age group numbered 194 (115 male and 79 female), or 17.2% of the total population. 312 residents were members of Scheduled Castes, or 27.7% of the total.

The 1981 census recorded Harchandpur as having a population of 618 people, in 105 households.

The 1961 census recorded Harchandpur as comprising 3 hamlets, with a total population of 413 people (215 male and 198 female), in 97 households and 67 physical houses.

== Infrastructure ==
As of 2011, Harchandpur had 1 primary school; it did not have any healthcare facilities. Drinking water was provided by hand pump; there were no public toilets. The village had a post office but no public library; there was at least some access to electricity for all purposes. Streets were made of both kachcha and pakka materials.
