= Khija, Mainpuri =

Village in Uttar Pradesh, India

Khija
- Village
- Location in Uttar Pradesh, India
- Coordinates: 27.23813°N 78.98711°E
- Country: India
- State: Uttar Pradesh
- District: Mainpuri
- Tehsil: Mainpuri

Area
  - Total: 0.864 km^{2} (0.334 sq mi)

Population (2011)
  - Total: 490
  - Density: 570/km^{2} (1,500/sq mi)
- Time zone: UTC+5:30 (IST)

Khija (Khījā) is a village in Mainpuri block of Mainpuri district, Uttar Pradesh. As of 2011, it had a population of 490, in 81 households.

== Demographics ==
As of 2011, Khija had a population of 490, in 81 households. This population was 54.3% male (266) and 45.7% female (224). The 0-6 age group numbered 87 (44 male and 43 female), or 17.8% of the total population. 138 residents were members of Scheduled Castes, or 28.2% of the total.

The 1981 census recorded Khija as having a population of 412 people, in 78 households.

The 1961 census recorded Khija as comprising 2 hamlets, with a total population of 259 people (137 male and 122 female), in 52 households and 48 physical houses. The area of the village was given as 214 acres.

== Infrastructure ==
As of 2011, Khija had 1 primary school; it did not have any healthcare facilities. Drinking water was provided by hand pump; there were no public toilets. The village had a post office but no public library; there was at least some access to electricity for residential and agricultural purposes. Streets were made of both kachcha and pakka materials.
