= Ghitauli =

Village in Uttar Pradesh, India

- Village
- Location in Uttar Pradesh, India
- Coordinates: 27.15844°N 79.00081°E
- Country: India
- State: Uttar Pradesh
- District: Mainpuri
- Tehsil: Mainpuri

Area
  - Total: 3.635 km^{2} (1.403 sq mi)

Population (2011)
  - Total: 913
  - Density: 251/km^{2} (651/sq mi)
- Time zone: UTC+5:30 (IST)

Ghitauli (Ghiṭaulī), also spelled Ghitoli (Ghitolī), is a village in Mainpuri block of Mainpuri district, Uttar Pradesh. As of 2011, it had a population of 913, in 154 households.

== Demographics ==
As of 2011, Ghitauli had a population of 913, in 154 households. This population was 50.9% male (465) and 49.1% female (448). The 0-6 age group numbered 107 (54 male and 53 female), or 11.7% of the total population. 115 residents were members of Scheduled Castes, or 12.6% of the total.

The 1981 census recorded Ghitauli as having a population of 523 people, in 98 households.

The 1961 census recorded Ghitauli as comprising 1 hamlet, with a total population of 403 people (203 male and 200 female), in 80 households and 66 physical houses. The area of the village was given as 909 acres.

== Infrastructure ==
As of 2011, Ghitauli had 1 primary school; it did not have any healthcare facilities. Drinking water was provided by well, hand pump, and tube well; there were no public toilets. The village had a post office but no public library; there was at least some access to electricity for all purposes. Streets were made of kachcha materials.
