= Ramaihar =

Village in Uttar Pradesh, India

- Village
- Location in Uttar Pradesh, India
- Coordinates: 27.24675°N 79.04073°E
- Country: India
- State: Uttar Pradesh
- District: Mainpuri
- Tehsil: Mainpuri

Area
  - Total: 0.38 km^{2} (0.15 sq mi)

Population (2011)
  - Total: 1,244
  - Density: 3,300/km^{2} (8,500/sq mi)
- Time zone: UTC+5:30 (IST)

Ramaihar is a village in Mainpuri block of Mainpuri district, Uttar Pradesh. As of 2011, it has a population of 1,244, in 210 households.

== Demographics ==
As of 2011, Ramaihar had a population of 1,244, in 210 households. This population was 52.5% male (653) and 47.5% female (591). The 0-6 age group numbered 218 (130 male and 88 female), or 17.5% of the total population. 214 residents were members of Scheduled Castes, or 17.2% of the total.

The 1981 census recorded Ramaihar as having a population of 548 people, in 112 households.

The 1961 census recorded Ramaihar as comprising 1 hamlet, with a total population of 358 people (188 male and 170 female), in 76 households and 62 physical houses. The area of the village was given as 94 acres.

== Infrastructure ==
As of 2011, Ramaihar had 2 primary schools; it did not have any healthcare facilities. Drinking water was provided by hand pump and tube well/borehole; there were no public toilets. The village did not have a post office or public library; there was at least some access to electricity for all purposes. Streets were made of both kachcha and pakka materials.
