= Kanchanpur, Mainpuri =

Village in Uttar Pradesh, India

Kanchanpur
- Village
- Location in Uttar Pradesh, India
- Coordinates: 27.37258°N 78.91724°E
- Country: India
- State: Uttar Pradesh
- District: Mainpuri
- Tehsil: Mainpuri

Area
  - Total: 1.236 km^{2} (0.477 sq mi)

Population (2011)
  - Total: 255
  - Density: 206/km^{2} (534/sq mi)
- Time zone: UTC+5:30 (IST)

Kanchanpur (Kañchanpur) is a village in Kuraoli block of Mainpuri district, Uttar Pradesh, India. As of 2011, it had a population of 255, in 42 households.

== Demographics ==
As of 2011, Kanchanpur had a population of 255, in 42 households. This population was 53.3% male (136) and 46.7% female (119). The 0-6 age group numbered 30 (18 male and 12 female), or 11.8% of the total population. 75 residents were members of Scheduled Castes, or 29.4% of the total.

The 1981 census recorded Kanchanpur as having a population of 213 people, in 36 households.

The 1961 census recorded Kanchanpur as comprising 1 hamlet, with a total population of 173 people (88 male and 85 female), in 31 households and 15 physical houses. The area of the village was given as 304 acres.

== Infrastructure ==
As of 2011, Kanchanpur had 1 primary school; it did not have any healthcare facilities. Drinking water was provided by tap and hand pump; there were no public toilets. The village had a post office but no public library; there was at least some access to electricity for all purposes. Streets were made of both kachcha and pakka materials.
