= Kharpari =

Village in Uttar Pradesh, India

- Village
- Location in Uttar Pradesh, India
- Coordinates: 27.2103°N 79.04412°E
- Country: India
- State: Uttar Pradesh
- District: Mainpuri
- Tehsil: Mainpuri

Area
  - Total: 7.369 km^{2} (2.845 sq mi)

Population (2011)
  - Total: 15,060
  - Density: 2,044/km^{2} (5,293/sq mi)
- Time zone: UTC+5:30 (IST)
- PIN: 205001

Kharpari (Kharparī) is a village in Mainpuri block of Mainpuri district, Uttar Pradesh. It is located very close to the town of Mainpuri. As of 2011, it has a population of 15,060, in 2,638 households.

== Geography ==
Kharpari is located 1 km from the town of Mainpuri.

== Demographics ==
As of 2011, Kharpari had a population of 15,060, in 2,638 households. This population was 53.1% male (7,994) and 46.9% female (7,066). The 0-6 age group numbered 1,998 (1,075 male and 923 female), or 13.3% of the total population. 2,283 residents were members of Scheduled Castes, or 15.2% of the total.

The 1981 census recorded Kharpari as having a population of 5,171 people, in 959 households.

The 1961 census recorded Kharpari as comprising 9 hamlets, with a total population of 3,689 people (1,999 male and 1,690 female), in 744 households and 673 physical houses. The area of the village was given as 673 acres and it had a post office at that point.

== Infrastructure ==
As of 2011, Kharpari had 1 primary school; it did not have any healthcare facilities. Drinking water was provided by hand pump; there were no public toilets. The village had a post office and public library, as well as at least some access to electricity for all purposes. Streets were made of both kachcha and pakka materials.
