= Thorwa =

Village in Uttar Pradesh, India

- Village
- Location in Uttar Pradesh, India
- Coordinates: 27.3133°N 78.89358°E
- Country: India
- State: Uttar Pradesh
- District: Mainpuri
- Tehsil: Mainpuri

Area
  - Total: 8.756 km^{2} (3.381 sq mi)

Population (2011)
  - Total: 4,030
  - Density: 460/km^{2} (1,190/sq mi)
- Time zone: UTC+5:30 (IST)
- PIN: 205263

Thorwa (Thorwā) is a village in Kuraoli block of Mainpuri district, Uttar Pradesh, India. There is a prominent jhil near the village site. As of 2011, Thorwa had a population of 4,030, in 646 households.

== Geography ==
There is a prominent jhil at Thorwa.

== Demographics ==
As of 2011, Thorwa had a population of 4,030, in 646 households. This population was 52.9% male (2,133) and 47.1% female (1,897). The 0-6 age group numbered 636 (318 male and 318 female), or 15.8% of the total population. 791 residents were members of Scheduled Castes, or 19.6% of the total.

The 1981 census recorded Thorwa as having a population of 4,030, in 646 households.

The 1961 census recorded Thorwa as comprising 7 hamlets, with a total population of 1,654 people (865 male and 789 female), in 263 households and 233 physical houses. The area of the village was given as 2,183 acres and it had a post office at that point.

== Infrastructure ==
As of 2011, Thorwa had 1 primary school; it did not have any healthcare facilities. Drinking water was provided by hand pump and tube well; there were no public toilets. The village had a post office but no public library; there was at least some access to electricity for residential and agricultural purposes. Streets were made of both kachcha and pakka materials.
