= Ganga Jamuni =

Village in Uttar Pradesh, India

- Village
- Location in Uttar Pradesh, India
- Coordinates: 27.41893°N 78.92587°E
- Country: India
- State: Uttar Pradesh
- District: Mainpuri
- Tehsil: Mainpuri

Area
  - Total: 1.034 km^{2} (0.399 sq mi)

Population (2011)
  - Total: 319
  - Density: 309/km^{2} (799/sq mi)
- Time zone: UTC+5:30 (IST)

Ganga Jamuni (Gaṅgā Jamunī) is a village in Kuraoli block of Mainpuri district, Uttar Pradesh. It is located on a further small tributary of the Kali Nadi river called the Ganga Jamuni Nala, which dried up after the construction of a national highway near the village. There is also an archaeological site nearby. As of 2011, Ganga Jamuni had a population of 319, in 50 households.

== Geography ==
Ganga Jamuni is located about 1.5 km from the Kali Nadi river, on the bank of a smaller tributary stream called the Ganga Jamuni Nala. The Ganga Jamuni Nala has now dried up due to the construction of the Grand Trunk Road national highway to the north of the village. There is an archaeological site associated with the Ochre Coloured Pottery culture north of the highway, across from the village. The ancient inhabitants of the site could have used the Kali Nadi floodplain, or the area along the Ganga Jamuni Nala, for agriculture.

== Demographics ==
As of 2011, Ganga Jamuni had a population of 319, in 50 households. This population was 52.0% male (166) and 48.0% female (153). The 0-6 age group numbered 52 (21 male and 31 female), or 16.3% of the total population. 36 residents were members of Scheduled Castes, or 11.3% of the total.

The 1981 census recorded Ganga Jamuni as having a population of 271 people, in 49 households.

The 1961 census recorded Ganga Jamuni as comprising 1 hamlet, with a total population of 138 people (77 male and 61 female), in 24 households and 20 physical houses. The area of the village was given as 275 acres.

== Infrastructure ==
As of 2011, Ganga Jamuni had 1 primary school; it did not have any healthcare facilities. Drinking water was provided by hand pump; there were no public toilets. The village had a post office but no public library; there was at least some access to electricity for all purposes. Streets were made of both kachcha and pakka materials.
