= Ruppur Bharatpur =

Village in Uttar Pradesh, India

- Village
- Location in Uttar Pradesh, India
- Coordinates: 27.27921°N 79.01374°E
- Country: India
- State: Uttar Pradesh
- District: Mainpuri
- Tehsil: Mainpuri

Area
  - Total: 3.73 km^{2} (1.44 sq mi)

Population (2011)
  - Total: 1,623
  - Density: 435/km^{2} (1,130/sq mi)
- Time zone: UTC+5:30 (IST)
- PIN: 205001

Ruppur Bharatpur (Rūppur Bharatpur) is a village in Mainpuri block of Mainpuri district, Uttar Pradesh, India. As of 2011, it had a population of 1,623, in 267 households.

== Demographics ==
As of 2011, Ruppur Bharatpur had a population of 1,623, in 267 households. This population was 53.0% male (861) and 47.0% female (762). The 0-6 age group numbered 268 (132 male and 136 female), or 16.5% of the total population. 353 residents were members of Scheduled Castes, or 21.7% of the total.

The 1981 census recorded Ruppur Bharatpur as having a population of 821 people, in 128 households.

The 1961 census recorded Ruppur Bharatpur as comprising 3 hamlets, with a total population of 472 people (253 male and 219 female), in 84 households and 83 physical houses. The area of the village was given as 910 acres.

== Infrastructure ==
As of 2011, Ruppur Bharatpur had 1 primary school; it did not have any healthcare facilities. Drinking water was provided by hand pump and tube well; there were no public toilets. The village did not have a post office or public library; there was at least some access to electricity for all purposes. Streets were made of both kachcha and pakka materials.
