= Belahar, Mainpuri =

Village in Uttar Pradesh, India

Belahar
- Village
- Location in Uttar Pradesh, India
- Coordinates: 27.38238°N 78.90131°E
- Country: India
- State: Uttar Pradesh
- District: Mainpuri
- Tehsil: Mainpuri

Area
  - Total: 4.733 km^{2} (1.827 sq mi)

Population (2011)
  - Total: 1,900
  - Density: 400/km^{2} (1,000/sq mi)
- Time zone: UTC+5:30 (IST)

Belahar (Belāhār) is a village in Kuraoli block of Mainpuri district, Uttar Pradesh, India. As of 2011, it had a population of 1,900, in 317 households.

== Demographics ==
As of 2011, Belahar had a population of 1,900, in 317 households. This population was 51.9% male (987) and 48.1% female (913). The 0-6 age group numbered 303 (150 male and 153 female), or 15.9% of the total population. 153 residents were members of Scheduled Castes, or 8.1% of the total.

The 1981 census recorded Belahar as having a population of 1,190 people, in 220 households.

The 1961 census recorded Belahar as comprising 4 hamlets, with a total population of 1,066 people (566 male and 500 female), in 200 households and 130 physical houses. The area of the village was given as 1,173 acres.

== Infrastructure ==
As of 2011, Belahar had 2 primary schools; it did not have any healthcare facilities. Drinking water was provided by hand pump and tube well; there were no public toilets. The village had a public library but no post office; there was at least some access to electricity for all purposes. Streets were made of both kachcha and pakka materials.
