= Angautha =

Village in Uttar Pradesh, India

- Village
- Location in Uttar Pradesh, India
- Coordinates: 27.16144°N 79.03592°E
- Country: India
- State: Uttar Pradesh
- District: Mainpuri
- Tehsil: Mainpuri

Area
  - Total: 18.948 km^{2} (7.316 sq mi)

Population (2011)
  - Total: 9,105
  - Density: 480.5/km^{2} (1,245/sq mi)
- Time zone: UTC+5:30 (IST)

Angautha (Aṅgauthā) is a village in Mainpuri block of Mainpuri district, Uttar Pradesh. It is located about 10 km southeast of Mainpuri. As of 2011, it has a population of 9,105, in 1,420 households.

== Geography ==
Angautha is located about 10 km southeast of Mainpuri.

== Demographics ==
As of 2011, Angautha had a population of 9,105, in 1,420 households. This population was 44.2% male (4,939) and 45.8% female (4,166). The 0-6 age group numbered 1,337 (711 male and 626 female), or 14.7% of the total population. 1,580 residents were members of Scheduled Castes, or 17.4% of the total.

The 1981 census recorded Angautha as having a population of 5,154 people, in 855 households.

The 1961 census recorded Angautha as comprising 16 hamlets, with a total population of 3,860 people (2,127 male and 1,733 female), in 709 households and 563 physical houses. The area of the village was given as 4,682 acres.

As of 1901, Angautha had a population of 2,516, in 15 hamlets, and there was a school in the village teaching in the Hindustani language.

== Infrastructure ==
As of 2011, Angautha had 4 primary schools and 1 primary health centre. Drinking water was provided by tap, well, hand pump, and tube well; there were no public toilets. The village had a post office and a public library, as well as at least some access to electricity for all purposes. Streets were made of both kachcha and pakka materials.
