= Kalyanpur, Mainpuri =

Village in Uttar Pradesh, India

Kalyanpur
- Village
- Location in Uttar Pradesh, India
- Coordinates: 27.45019°N 78.87991°E
- Country: India
- State: Uttar Pradesh
- District: Mainpuri
- Tehsil: Mainpuri

Area
  - Total: 1.124 km^{2} (0.434 sq mi)

Population (2011)
  - Total: 1,759
  - Density: 1,565/km^{2} (4,053/sq mi)
- Time zone: UTC+5:30 (IST)

Kalyanpur (Kalyāṇpur) is a village in Kuraoli block of Mainpuri district, Uttar Pradesh. As of 2011, it had a population of 1,759, in 274 households.

== Demographics ==
As of 2011, Kalyanpur had a population of 1,759, in 274 households. This population was 54.9% male (965) and 45.1% female (794). The 0-6 age group numbered 268 (147 male and 121 female), or 15.2% of the total population. 33 residents were members of Scheduled Castes, or 1.9% of the total.

The 1981 census recorded Kalyanpur (as "Kaliyanpur") as having a population of 1,005 people, in 164 households.

The 1961 census recorded Kalyanpur as comprising 1 hamlet, with a total population of 666 people (352 male and 314 female), in 114 households and 80 physical houses. The area of the village was given as 278 acres.

== Infrastructure ==
As of 2011, Kalyanpur had 3 primary schools; it did not have any healthcare facilities. Drinking water was provided by well and hand pump; there were no public toilets. The village did not have a post office or public library; there was at least some access to electricity for all purposes. Streets were made of both kachcha and pakka materials.
