= Dharenda =

Village in Uttar Pradesh, India

- Village
- Location in Uttar Pradesh, India
- Coordinates: 27.36139°N 78.9108°E
- Country: India
- State: Uttar Pradesh
- District: Mainpuri
- Tehsil: Mainpuri

Area
  - Total: 2.022 km^{2} (0.781 sq mi)

Population (2011)
  - Total: 1,461
  - Density: 722.6/km^{2} (1,871/sq mi)
- Time zone: UTC+5:30 (IST)

Dharenda (Dharendā) is a village in Kuraoli block of Mainpuri district, Uttar Pradesh, India. As of 2011, it had a population of 1,461, in 225 households.

== Demographics ==
As of 2011, Dharenda had a population of 1,461, in 225 households. This population was 55.4% male (810) and 44.6% female (651). The 0-6 age group numbered 254 (136 male and 118 female), or 17.4% of the total population. 11 residents were members of Scheduled Castes, or 0.8% of the total.

The 1981 census recorded Dharenda as having a population of 712 people, in 111 households.

The 1961 census recorded Dharenda as comprising 1 hamlet, with a total population of 542 people (276 male and 266 female), in 96 households and 53 physical houses. The area of the village was given as 500 acres.

== Infrastructure ==
As of 2011, Dharenda had 1 primary school; it did not have any healthcare facilities. Drinking water was provided by tap and hand pump; there were no public toilets. The village did not have a post office or public library; there was at least some access to electricity for all purposes. Streets were made of pakka materials.
