= Rustampur, Mainpuri =

Village in Uttar Pradesh, India

Rustampur
- Village
- Location in Uttar Pradesh, India
- Coordinates: 27.41529°N 78.98717°E
- Country: India
- State: Uttar Pradesh
- District: Mainpuri
- Tehsil: Mainpuri

Area
  - Total: 1.016 km^{2} (0.392 sq mi)

Population (2011)
  - Total: 861
  - Density: 847/km^{2} (2,190/sq mi)
- Time zone: UTC+5:30 (IST)

Rustampur (Rustampur) is a village in Kuraoli block of Mainpuri district, Uttar Pradesh, India. As of 2011, it had a population of 861, in 115 households.

== Demographics ==
As of 2011, Rustampur had a population of 861, in 115 households. This population was 50.5% male (435) and 49.5% female (426). The 0-6 age group numbered 119 (61 male and 58 female), or 13.8% of the total population. No residents were members of Scheduled Castes.

The 1981 census recorded Rustampur as having a population of 446 people, in 86 households.

The 1961 census recorded Rustampur as comprising 1 hamlet, with a total population of 299 people (153 male and 146 female), in 55 households and 37 physical houses. The area of the village was given as 252 acres.

== Infrastructure ==
As of 2011, Rustampur had 1 primary school; it did not have any healthcare facilities. Drinking water was provided by hand pump and tube well; there were no public toilets. The village had a post office and public library, as well as at least some access to electricity for all purposes. Streets were made of both kachcha and pakka materials.
