= Birsinghpur, Kuraoli =

Village in Uttar Pradesh, India

Birsinghpur
- Village
- Location in Uttar Pradesh, India
- Coordinates: 27.39663°N 78.93878°E
- Country: India
- State: Uttar Pradesh
- District: Mainpuri
- Tehsil: Mainpuri

Area
  - Total: 0.804 km^{2} (0.310 sq mi)

Population (2011)
  - Total: 796
  - Density: 990/km^{2} (2,560/sq mi)
- Time zone: UTC+5:30 (IST)
- PIN: 205265

Birsinghpur (Bīrsiṅghpur) is a village in Kuraoli block of Mainpuri district, Uttar Pradesh. As of 2011, it had a population of 796, in 141 households.

== Demographics ==
As of 2011, Birsinghpur had a population of 796, in 141 households. This population was 51.5% male (402) and 49.5% female (394). The 0-6 age group numbered 94 (57 male and 37 female), or 11.8% of the total population. 248 residents were members of Scheduled Castes, or 31.2% of the total.

The 1981 census recorded Birsinghpur as having a population of 463 people, in 75 households.

The 1961 census recorded Birsinghpur as comprising 1 hamlet, with a total population of 374 people (202 male and 172 female), in 64 households and 64 physical houses. The area of the village was given as 199 acres.

== Infrastructure ==
As of 2011, Birsinghpur had 1 primary school; it did not have any healthcare facilities. Drinking water was provided by hand pump; there were no public toilets. The village did not have a post office or public library; there was at least some access to electricity for all purposes. Streets were made of pakka materials.
