= Jamlapur =

Village in Uttar Pradesh, India

- Village
- Location in Uttar Pradesh, India
- Coordinates: 27.42395°N 78.93999°E
- Country: India
- State: Uttar Pradesh
- District: Mainpuri
- Tehsil: Mainpuri

Area
  - Total: 1.844 km^{2} (0.712 sq mi)

Population (2011)
  - Total: 1,344
  - Density: 728.9/km^{2} (1,888/sq mi)
- Time zone: UTC+5:30 (IST)
- PIN: 206265

Jamlapur (Jamlāpur) is a village in Kuraoli block of Mainpuri district, Uttar Pradesh. As of 2011, it had a population of 1,344, in 223 households.

== Geography ==
Jamlapur is located close to the Kali Nadi stream, which forms the district boundary between Mainpuri and Etah districts. The Kali Nadi is ordinarily a fairly small stream, not especially prone to flooding in most places. At Jamlapur, however, it regularly spills over onto the low-lying alluvial area along its banks during the rainy season.

== Demographics ==
As of 2011, Jamlapur had a population of 1,344, in 223 households. This population was 53.6% male (720) and 46.4% female (624). The 0-6 age group numbered 210 (111 male and 99 female), or 15.6% of the total population. 186 residents were members of Scheduled Castes, or 13.8% of the total.

The 1981 census recorded Jamlapur (as "Jamalapur") as having a population of 726 people, in 115 households.

The 1961 census recorded Jamlapur (as "Jamalpur") as comprising 2 hamlets, with a total population of 514 people (282 male and 232 female), in 96 households and 62 physical houses. The area of the village was given as 465 acres.

== Infrastructure ==
As of 2011, Jamlapur had 1 primary school; it did not have any healthcare facilities. Drinking water was provided by hand pump; there were no public toilets. The village did not have a post office or public library; there was at least some access to electricity for all purposes. Streets were made of pakka materials.
