= Paharpur, Kuraoli =

Village in Uttar Pradesh, India

Paharpur
- Village
- Location in Uttar Pradesh, India
- Coordinates: 27.39771°N 78.90329°E
- Country: India
- State: Uttar Pradesh
- District: Mainpuri
- Tehsil: Mainpuri

Area
  - Total: 2.559 km^{2} (0.988 sq mi)

Population (2011)
  - Total: 1,517
  - Density: 592.8/km^{2} (1,535/sq mi)
- Time zone: UTC+5:30 (IST)
- PIN: 205265

Paharpur (Pahāṛpur) is a village in Kuraoli block of Mainpuri district, Uttar Pradesh. As of 2011, it had a population of 1,517, in 228 households.

== Demographics ==
As of 2011, Paharpur had a population of 1,517, in 228 households. This population was 54.6% male (829) and 45.4% female (688). The 0-6 age group numbered 232 (132 male and 100 female), or 15.3% of the total population. No residents were members of Scheduled Castes.

The 1981 census recorded Paharpur as having a population of 842 people, in 132 households.

The 1961 census recorded Paharpur as comprising 1 hamlets, with a total population of 548 people (298 male and 250 female), in 90 households and 76 physical houses. The area of the village was given as 622 acres.

== Infrastructure ==
As of 2011, Paharpur had 1 primary school; it did not have any healthcare facilities. Drinking water was provided by hand pump; there were no public toilets. The village had a post office but no public library; there was at least some access to electricity for all purposes. Streets were made of both kachcha and pakka materials.
