= Auden Padariya =

Village in Uttar Pradesh, India

- Village
- Location in Uttar Pradesh, India
- Coordinates: 27.205°N 79.02918°E
- Country: India
- State: Uttar Pradesh
- District: Mainpuri
- Tehsil: Mainpuri

Area
  - Total: 12.5481 km^{2} (4.8448 sq mi)

Population (2011)
  - Total: 9,685
  - Density: 771.8/km^{2} (1,999/sq mi)
- Time zone: UTC+5:30 (IST)
- PIN: 205001

Auden Padariya (Auḍen Paḍāriyā) is a large village in Mainpuri block of Mainpuri district, Uttar Pradesh. It is located just south of Mainpuri. As of 2011, it had a population of 9,685, in 1,605 households.

== Geography ==
Auden Padariya is located about 3 km south of Mainpuri, on the main road to Etawah. The Kanpur branch of the Lower Ganga Canal passes through village lands, and there is a bridge at the subsidiary hamlet of Singhpur.

According to the 2011 census, Auden Padariya has a total area of 1,248.1 hectares, of which 737.2 were currently farmland and 137.0 were under non-agricultural use. 12.5 hectares were occupied by orchards, 0 were occupied by permanent pastures, 147.0 were classified as cultivable but not currently under any agricultural use, and 93.1 were classified as non-cultivable. There were no forests on village lands.

== History ==
As of 1901, Auden Padariya had a population of 2,879, and consisted of "9 mahals and 11 hamlets". The village was then used as a recruitment centre for the 8th Bengal Cavalry, and it also had a school at that point teaching in the Hindustani language.

== Demographics ==
As of 2011, Auden Padariya had a population of 9,685, in 1,605 households. This population was 52.3% male (5,063) and 47.7% female (4,622). The 0-6 age group numbered 1,236 (679 male and 557 female), or 12.8% of the total population. 1,412 residents were members of Scheduled Castes, or 14.6% of the total.

The 1981 census recorded Auden Padariya (as "Auden Padriya") as having a population of 6,343 people, in 1,218 households.

The 1961 census recorded Auden Padariya (as "Auden Padriya") as comprising 1 hamlet, with a total population of 4,467 people (2,355 male and 2,112 female), in 882 households and 745 physical houses. The area of the village was given as 4,633 acres.

== Infrastructure ==
As of 2011, Auden Padariya had 6 primary schools. Drinking water was provided by well, hand pump, and tube well; there were no public toilets. The village had a post office and a public library, as well as at least some access to electricity for all purposes. Streets were made of both kachcha and pakka materials.
