= Bhanpur, Mainpuri =

Village in Uttar Pradesh, India

Bhanpur
- Village
- Location in Uttar Pradesh, India
- Coordinates: 27.34302°N 78.97752°E
- Country: India
- State: Uttar Pradesh
- District: Mainpuri
- Tehsil: Mainpuri

Area
  - Total: 1.618 km^{2} (0.625 sq mi)

Population (2011)
  - Total: 1,436
  - Density: 887.5/km^{2} (2,299/sq mi)
- Time zone: UTC+5:30 (IST)

Bhanpur (Bhānpur) is a village in Kuraoli block of Mainpuri district, Uttar Pradesh, India. As of 2011, it had a population of 1,436, in 212 households.

== Demographics ==
As of 2011, Bhanpur had a population of 1,436, in 212 households. This population was 51.5% male (739) and 48.5% female (697). The 0-6 age group numbered 556 (292 male and 264 female), or 38.7% of the total population. 68 residents were members of Scheduled Castes, or 4.7% of the total.

The 1981 census recorded Bhanpur as having a population of 788 people, in 117 households.

The 1961 census recorded Bhanpur as comprising 1 hamlet, with a total population of 466 people (249 male and 217 female), in 95 households and 69 physical houses. The area of the village was given as 279 acres.

== Infrastructure ==
As of 2011, Bhanpur had 1 primary school; it did not have any healthcare facilities. Drinking water was provided by well and hand pump; there were no public toilets. The village did not have a post office or public library; there was at least some access to electricity for all purposes. Streets were made of both kachcha and pakka materials.
