= Marauli, Mainpuri =

Village in Uttar Pradesh, India

Marauli Maroli
- Village
- Location in Uttar Pradesh, India
- Coordinates: 27.205001°N 78.9167259°E
- Country: India
- State: Uttar Pradesh
- District: Mainpuri
- Tehsil: Mainpuri

Area
  - Total: 3.163 km^{2} (1.221 sq mi)

Population (2011)
  - Total: 2,023
  - Density: 639.6/km^{2} (1,657/sq mi)
- Time zone: UTC+5:30 (IST)
- PIN: 205001

Marauli (Maraulī), also spelled Maroli (Marolī), is a village in Mainpuri block of Mainpuri district, Uttar Pradesh. As of 2011, it has a population of 2,023, in 335 households.

== Demographics ==
As of 2011, Marauli had a population of 2,023, in 335 households. This population was 52.6% male (1,064) and 47.4% female (959). The 0-6 age group numbered 312 (157 male and 155 female), or 15.4% of the total population. 293 residents were members of Scheduled Castes, or 14.5% of the total.

The 1981 census recorded Marauli as having a population of 1,113 people, in 204 households.

The 1961 census recorded Marauli as comprising 2 hamlets, with a total population of 928 people (496 male and 432 female), in 180 households and 137 physical houses. The area of the village was given as 757 acres.

== Infrastructure ==
As of 2011, Marauli had 1 primary school; it did not have any healthcare facilities. Drinking water was provided by hand pump and tube well/borehole; there were no public toilets. The village had a post office but no public library; there was at least some access to electricity for all purposes. Streets were made of both kachcha and pakka materials.
