= Sarai Latif =

Village in Uttar Pradesh, India

- Village
- Location in Uttar Pradesh, India
- Coordinates: 27.41057°N 78.93161°E
- Country: India
- State: Uttar Pradesh
- District: Mainpuri
- Tehsil: Mainpuri

Area
  - Total: 2.049 km^{2} (0.791 sq mi)

Population (2011)
  - Total: 1,620
  - Density: 791/km^{2} (2,050/sq mi)
- Time zone: UTC+5:30 (IST)
- PIN: 205265

Sarai Latif (Sarāy Latīf) is a village in Kuraoli block of Mainpuri district, Uttar Pradesh, India. As of 2011, it had a population of 1,620, in 286 households.

== Demographics ==
As of 2011, Sarai Latif had a population of 1,620, in 286 households. This population was 52.9% male (857) and 47.1% female (763). The 0-6 age group numbered 271 (146 male and 125 female), or 16.7% of the total population. 719 residents were members of Scheduled Castes, or 44.4% of the total.

The 1981 census recorded Sarai Latif (as "Sarailatif") as having a population of 1,137 people, in 195 households.

The 1961 census recorded Sarai Latif as comprising 4 hamlets, with a total population of 783 people (414 male and 369 female), in 163 households and 132 physical houses. The area of the village was given as 589 acres.

== Infrastructure ==
As of 2024, Sarai Latif had 2 primary schools; it have primary healthcare facilities. Drinking water was provided by hand pump; there are public toilets. The village did not have a post office or public library; there was access to electricity for all purposes. Streets were made of pakka material. Education is up to class 12 Janta inter college is oldest government institution in sarai latif provide education up to class 12 in Arts Stream .Village is well connected by N.H 34(G.T Road) .
