= Sirsa, Mainpuri =

Village in Uttar Pradesh, India

Sirsa
- Village
- Location in Uttar Pradesh, India
- Coordinates: 27.38726°N 78.99134°E
- Country: India
- State: Uttar Pradesh
- District: Mainpuri
- Tehsil: Mainpuri

Area
  - Total: 2.976 km^{2} (1.149 sq mi)

Population (2011)
  - Total: 3,378
  - Density: 1,135/km^{2} (2,940/sq mi)
- Time zone: UTC+5:30 (IST)

Sirsa (Sirsā) is a village in Kuraoli block of Mainpuri district, Uttar Pradesh, India. There is a prominent jhil near the village site. As of 2011, Sirsa has a population of 3,378, in 571 households.

== Geography ==
There is a prominent jhil at Sirsa.

== Demographics ==
As of 2011, Sirsa had a population of 3,378, in 571 households. This population was 52.8% male (1,783) and 47.2% female (1,595). The 0-6 age group numbered 600 (317 male and 283 female), or 17.8% of the total population. 793 residents were members of Scheduled Castes, or 23.5% of the total.

The 1981 census recorded Sirsa as having a population of 1,776 people, in 320 households.

The 1961 census recorded Sirsa as comprising 2 hamlets, with a total population of 1,261 people (678 male and 583 female), in 255 households and 224 physical houses. The area of the village was given as 742 acres.

== Infrastructure ==
As of 2011, Sirsa had 1 primary school; it did not have any healthcare facilities. Drinking water was provided by hand pump and tube well; there were no public toilets. The village had a post office and public library, as well as at least some access to electricity for all purposes. Streets were made of both kachcha and pakka materials.
