= Bharatpur, Kuraoli =

Village in Uttar Pradesh, India

Bharatpur
- Village
- Location in Uttar Pradesh, India
- Coordinates: 27.4313°N 78.86919°E
- Country: India
- State: Uttar Pradesh
- District: Mainpuri
- Tehsil: Mainpuri

Area
  - Total: 1.179 km^{2} (0.455 sq mi)

Population (2011)
  - Total: 1,100
  - Density: 930/km^{2} (2,400/sq mi)
- Time zone: UTC+5:30 (IST)

Bharatpur (Bharatpur) is a village in Kuraoli block of Mainpuri district, Uttar Pradesh, India. It is west of Kuraoli and near the Ganeshpur archaeological site. As of 2011, it had a population of 1,100, in 163 households.

== Geography ==
Bharatpur is located 12 km west of Kuraoli. About 600 m north of the village is an archaeological mound associated with the Ochre Coloured Pottery culture. The soil in this area is hard and calcareous. To the east is a long depression running north–south.

Just northeast of Bharatpur, at a distance of 10 km west of Kuraoli, is the site of Ganeshpur, which also has an archaeological mound associated with the Ochre Coloured Pottery culture. There are two shallow depressions near Ganeshpur: one on the east and the other on the north, between the canal and the national highway.

== Archaeology ==
Very few pottery fragments have been found at the Bharatpur site. What has been found has been identified with the Ochre Coloured Pottery culture. Inhabitants of the ancient site likely used the long depression to the east both for agriculture and as a source of water.

In 2022, a local farmer at Ganeshpur discovered a copper hoard while ploughing his field. He initially tried to stash the items away at home in the hopes of making money by selling them, but "envious" neighbours informed the police and the farmer had to turn over the artifacts to the Archaeological Survey of India, who then conducted an excavation at the Ganeshpur site. The copper hoard contained 77 items: 61 weapons and 16 anthropomorphic figurines. As of 2022, it was the largest copper hoard found in the region. Most of the weapons found were harpoons. The various items are dated to around 2000-1800 BCE. Archaeologists also found a potter's kiln and ceramics associated with the Ochre Coloured Pottery culture. This discovery is significant because it is the first time where Ochre Coloured Pottery and Copper Hoard artifacts have been found alongside each other, providing concrete evidence that the two types both belonged to the same material culture.

== Demographics ==
As of 2011, Bharatpur had a population of 1,100, in 163 households. This population was 54.2% male (596) and 45.8% female (504). The 0-6 age group numbered 160 (86 male and 74 female), or 14.5% of the total population. 120 residents were members of Scheduled Castes, or 10.9% of the total.

The 1981 census recorded Bharatpur as having a population of 769 people, in 117 households.

The 1961 census recorded Bharatpur (as "Bharatpura") as comprising 1 hamlet, with a total population of 577 people (298 male and 279 female), in 93 households and 83 physical houses. The area of the village was given as 291 acres.

== Infrastructure ==
As of 2011, Bharatpur had 1 primary school; it did not have any healthcare facilities. Drinking water was provided by well and hand pump; there were no public toilets. The village did not have a post office or public library; there was at least some access to electricity for all purposes. Streets were made of pakka materials.
