= Karimganj, Mainpuri =

Village in Uttar Pradesh, India

Karimganj
- Village
- Location in Uttar Pradesh, India
- Coordinates: 27.31018°N 79.03611°E
- Country: India
- State: Uttar Pradesh
- District: Mainpuri
- Tehsil: Mainpuri

Area
  - Total: 16.544 km^{2} (6.388 sq mi)

Population (2011)
  - Total: 8,711
  - Density: 526.5/km^{2} (1,364/sq mi)
- Time zone: UTC+5:30 (IST)
- PIN: 205001

Karimganj (Karīmgañj) is a village in Mainpuri block of Mainpuri district, Uttar Pradesh. Once a major town, it declined in the late 1700s as many of its residents moved to Mainpuri. A large lake, which is partly seasonal, exists on the west side of the village. As of 2011, Karimganj has a population of 8,711, in 1,406 households.

== Geography ==
Karimganj is located about 10 km north of Mainpuri on the Etah road. On the west side of the village is a large, crescent-shaped lake (or jhil), measuring about 1.5 km long and covering 32 hectares during its peak in the rainy season. During the dry season, the lake shrinks significantly. Also next to the village is a large mound, or khera, which marks the old town centre. At the top of the khera are the ruins of an old fort built by Khan Bahadur Khan in the mid-1700s.

== History ==
Karimganj was once a much larger town than it is today, rivalling Mainpuri in size. As of the early 20th century, only traces of the old town were still visible, including two gateways on the main road. The town had an inner bazar and an outer ganj (marketplace), and its population was in the thousands. In the mid-1700s, the town was the seat of a powerful local ruler named Khan Bahadur Khan, who built a fort here. Around 1746, Khan Bahadur Khan supposedly helped the raja of Mainpuri in developing the new town of Mukhamganj (which now forms the main core of Mainpuri). Many of Karimganj's residents ended up moving to Mainpuri, and Karimganj shrank in both population and importance.

Karimganj experienced a significant regrowth in the late 1800s – its population grew from 847 in 1872 to 2,263 in 1901. At the turn of the century, it was described as comprising 9 hamlets.

== Demographics ==
As of 2011, Karimganj had a population of 8,711, in 1,406 households. This population was 52.9% male (4,605) and 47.1% female (4,106). The 0-6 age group numbered 1,527 (793 male and 734 female), or 17.5% of the total population. 1,102 residents were members of Scheduled Castes, or 12.7% of the total.

The 1981 census recorded Karimganj as having a population of 4,475 people, in 760 households.

The 1961 census recorded Karimganj as comprising 7 hamlets, with a total population of 2,966 people (1,599 male and 1,367 female), in 534 households and 390 physical houses. The area of the village was given as 4,093 acres and it had a post office at that point.

== Infrastructure ==
As of 2011, Karimganj had 6 primary schools and 1 veterinary hospital but no healthcare facilities for humans. Drinking water was provided by hand pump; there were no public toilets. The village had a post office and public library, as well as at least some access to electricity for residential and commercial purposes. Streets were made of pakka materials.
