= MNQ =

MNQ or mnq may refer to:

- Mouvement national des Québécoises et des Québécois, a Canadian political organization
- MNQ, the Indian Railways station code for Mainpuri railway station, Uttar Pradesh, India
- mnq, the ISO 639-3 code for Minriq language, Malaysia
