= Kuraoli =

- Town
- Location in Uttar Pradesh, India Kuraoli (India)
- Coordinates: 27°23′52″N 78°58′09″E
- Country: India
- State: Uttar Pradesh
- District: Mainpuri

Area
  - Total: 12.6 km^{2} (4.9 sq mi)

Population (2011)
  - Total: 24,969
  - Density: 1,980/km^{2} (5,130/sq mi)

Languages
  - Official: Hindi
- Time zone: UTC+5:30 (IST)
- Vehicle registration: UP
- Website: up.gov.in

Kuraoli is a town and a nagar panchayat (urban municipality) in Mainpuri district in the Indian state of Uttar Pradesh. Kuraoli was known for Rathore thakur state in 18th century, now it is known for its largest garlic and onion mandi in Uttar Pradesh.

== Name ==
According to Paul Whalley, the name Kurāolī may be derived from koṭ, meaning "fort"; he reconstructed the hypothetical original name as *Koṭ-ā-vala, "having a fort", patterned after Sanskrit dantāvala ("tusked"). The name Kuraulī would be a further contracted version of the same name.

== Geography ==
Kuraoli is located in the northern corner of Mainpuri district, about 22 km from the town of Mainpuri. The main road linking Mainpuri and Etah passes through here.

== History ==
Kuraoli in the 18th century was in the kingdom of Rathore Thakur State ruled by King Laxman Singh, his three Queen's forts was built on 80 bigha of land, 100 metres east of the palace. Queen's Puja Place, was in North Direction about 100 m away, was a pucca pond of about 2 bigha, around the corners of the pond there were wells, As the pond has to be flooded all the time hence the wells do not show up.

There is a 25 km long tunnel which leads to Mainpurik Maharaj Tej Singh's fort.

There were three brothers, who were priests in the king's court, Once the king insulted the three and angered them. They cursed the king, destroying the king's empire.

Those three priests rest in afterlife in different places. These location seems to be famous for melas today, and these places are these names

- Under Galanath Bridge Pipra
- Under Chandrapura Pipara
- Hanuman Temple Under The Papra

After Holi, the mela is held at these three places.

At the turn of the 20th century, Kuraoli was described as an "open and well-built", if small, town, with a number of fine houses belonging to prosperous merchants. The town was split into two separate parts by the Etah-Mainpuri road, which was then part of the Grand Trunk Road. Kuraoli proper, which included six hamlets, lay to the north of the road. To the south of the road was Sujrai, which was technically a separate settlement but was counted as part of the town. The main highway ran between the two distinct built-up areas at full width, without narrowing to a regular city street like in nearby towns like Bhongaon or Bewar. While highway itself served as the main marketplace for those towns, Kuraoli was different – the main marketplace was on a side street away from the highway, while the highway itself only had a couple of shops on it. Kuraoli's market, and the shops inside it, were owned by the raja of Sujrai.

Kuraoli was described as only having risen to prominence rather recently at that point. It functioned as the main market centre for the surrounding countryside, and had a small net export of grain. At that point it had a post office, police station, and school teaching in the Hindustani language. The school was located in the middle of the town's main marketplace. The town then had 9 mosques and 21 Hindu temples. The oldest temple was the one built by the Kayasth qanungos, which was "not much more than a century" old at that point. The town was also noted for its local ophthalmologists known as the Satias, who exclusively treated cataracts; there were about 10 to 12 families of this group.

== Demographics ==
Historical population
Year	Pop.	±%
1901	4,339	—
1911	3,617	−16.6%
1921	4,717	+30.4%
1931	4,881	+3.5%
1941	5,315	+8.9%
1951	6,017	+13.2%
1961	7,409	+23.1%
1971	9,497	+28.2%
1981	12,591	+32.6%
1991	16,198	+28.6%
2001	20,682	+27.7%
2011	24,969	+20.7%
Source: 2011 Census of India

As of the 2011 census, Kuraoli had a population of 24,969, in 4,161 households. This population was 52.5% male (13,108) and 47.5% female (11,861). The 0-6 age group numbered 3,432 (1,838 male and 1,594 female), or 13.7% of the total population. 4,124 residents were members of Scheduled Castes, or 16.5% of the total. The town's literacy rate was 73.4% (counting only people age 7 and up).

An estimated 2,520 people live in slum conditions in Kuraoli as of 2011, in the four neighbourhoods of Bheemnagar, Kuvarpur, Khujrai, and Kanoon Goyan.

As of 2001 India census, Kuraoli had a population of 20,680. Males constitute 53% of the population and females 47%. Kuraoli has an average literacy rate of 56%, lower than the national average of 59.5%: male literacy is 65%, and female literacy is 47%. In Kuraoli, 17% of the population is under 6 years of age.

== Economy ==
Among biggest industries in Kuraoli are the making and processing of groundnut oil, wooden goods, and rice. Shoes, slippers, and furniture are among the most important manufactured goods produced in Kuraoli. As of 2009, Kuraoli had 2 nationalised banks, 0 private commercial banks, 1 cooperative bank, and 1 agricultural credit society.

== Infrastructure ==
As of 2011, Kuraoli has 1 hospital with 30 beds, 15 medicine shops, 7 schools teaching at the primary level, and 4 schools teaching at the secondary level. There is no public library. Drinking water is provided by tube well/borehole and stored in service reservoir(s), with a total capacity of 1,400 kilolitres. There is no local fire department; the closest is in Mainpuri.

== List of villages under Kuraoli block ==
The following 103 villages are counted as part of Kuraoli CD block:

1. Akbarpur Jhala
2. Alupura
3. Araji Tarwali
4. Ashokpur
5. Ashokpur
6. Athpura
7. Balipur
8. Balrampur
9. Barauliya
10. Barkhera
11. Basura Sultanpur
12. Beekapur
13. Belahar
14. Bhanpur
15. Bharatpur
16. Bichiya Vikrampur
17. Bikrampur
18. Birasinghpur
19. Chandrapur
20. Dahipagar
21. Dangan
22. Devinagar
23. Devkali
24. Dharendra
25. Dhivaiya
26. Divrayi
27. Dulhapur
28. E. Balabhpur
29. E. Hirapur
30. E. Khas
31. E. Mahloyi
32. E. Manjhpati
33. E. Gopalpur
34. E. Sari
35. Fatehjangpur
36. Firozpur
37. Gahiyarpur
38. Ganeshpur
39. Ganga Jamuni
40. Gangapur Muhabatpur
41. Gariya
42. Ghuslenda
43. Gokulpur
44. Gulalpur
45. Hafizpur
46. Harmadhakarpur
47. Hatu Mubarakpur
48. Jakhaua
49. Jamlapur
50. Jigan Chandai
51. Jiyoli Ghingarpur
52. Junhensa
53. Jyoti (rural)
54. Kalyanpur
55. Kanchanpur
56. Kanikpur
57. Karanpur
58. Khichauli
59. Khiriyapiper
60. Khirna
61. Kichaura
62. Kishanpur
63. Kookamai
64. Kumhraua
65. Lakhaura
66. Laxmipur
67. Madhkarpur
68. Mahadeva Jagatpur
69. Makboolpur
70. Manauna
71. Mithawali Kalan
72. Mithawali Khurd
73. Mugaliyapur
74. Nagla Daulat
75. Nagla Usar
76. Nagriya
77. Nanamau
78. Nasratpur Dehat
79. Naugaon
80. Naurangpur
81. Nijampur
82. Paharpur
83. Panwah
84. Rajapur
85. Rampura
86. Rasemar
87. Richpura
88. Rosingpur
89. Rustampur
90. Sahadattpur
91. Salempur
92. Saray Latif
93. Sharifpur
94. Sidpura
95. Sirsa
96. Soni
97. Sujanpur
98. Sujrai Dehat
99. Tarauli
100. Thorwa
101. Timanpur
102. Uddetpur Har Khatkani
103. Uddetpur Paramkuti
104. Vishunpur
