= Mainpuri railway station =

Railway station in Uttar Pradesh, India

Mainpuri Junction railway station
- Indian Railways logo

General information
- Location: Lane 12, Mainpuri, Mainpuri District, Uttar Pradesh; India
- Coordinates: 27°13′01″N 79°02′06″E
- Elevation: 159 metres (522 ft)
- System: Indian Railways station
- Owner: Indian Railways
- Operator: North Central Railway
- Platforms: 2

Construction
- Structure type: Standard on ground
- Parking: Yes
- Cycle facilities: No

Other information
- Status: Functioning
- Station code: MNQ
- Division(s): Prayagraj

History
- Opened: 1905
Location
- Location within India Location within Uttar Pradesh

Mainpuri Junction is on the Shikohabad-Farrukhabad branch line. It is located in Mainpuri district in the Indian state of Uttar Pradesh. It serves Mainpuri and the surrounding areas.

== History ==
A branch line was opened from Shikohabad to Mainpuri in 1905 and extended to Farrukhabad in 1906.

The Etawah–Mainpuri link route has started.

== Development ==
- Electrification is on completed on Shikohabad-Farrukhabad route.
- Electrification work is on completed on the Mainpuri-Etawah route.
- Etah-Gursahayganj via Mainpuri New Route:Bhogaon: A survey of a new railway line has been started by the Railways to improve rail connectivity in the district. The survey process has started on the new railway line from Gurusahaiganj to Etah district of Kannauj district. The new railway line can be laid through the GT Road bank in the district. As soon as the report of the survey is received, the Railways will decide in advance about the new line.

| Preceding station | Indian Railways | Following station |
|---|---|---|
| Tindoli towards ? | North Central Railway zone Shikohabad-Farrukhabad branch line | Mainpuri Kachehri towards ? |
