= Mainpuri =

- City
- Engineering College, Mainpuri Lohiya Park, Mainpuri

- Location within Uttar Pradesh
- Coordinates: 27.23°N 79.02°E
- Country: India
- State: Uttar Pradesh
- District: Mainpuri

Government
  - MP: Dimple Yadav

Area
  - Total: 7 km^{2} (2.7 sq mi)
- Elevation: 153 m (502 ft)

Population (2011)
  - Total: 136,557
  - Density: 20,000/km^{2} (51,000/sq mi)

Languages
  - Official: Hindi
  - Native: Braj Bhasha
- Time zone: UTC+5:30 (IST)
- PIN: 205001
- Telephone code: 05672
- Vehicle registration: UP-84
- Website: mainpuri.nic.in

Mainpuri (Hindi pronunciation: [mɛːn̪.pʊɾiː]; Mainpurī) is a city in Mainpuri district in the Indian state of Uttar Pradesh. It is the administrative headquarters of Mainpuri district and is 55 km from Etawah and 294 km from New Delhi. Mainpuri is located in the Braj region, which holds special religious significance to Hindus as the homeland of Krishna. As of 2011, Mainpuri had a population of 136,557 in 24,498 households.

== Geography ==
Mainpuri is located on a branch of the historical Grand Trunk Road, about 55 km from the city of Etawah and 116 km from the city of Agra. The Isan river is on the east side of town. Mainpuri is about 5 km downstream from the point where the Isan receives the Kak Nadi as a tributary. In this area, up until about 1 km downstream of Mainpuri, the Isan has a relatively shallow bed and often overflows during the monsoon season. Three bridges cross the Isan river in Mainpuri; the northernmost is by the Devi temple on the road to Kuraoli. The soil in this area is a mix of loam and usar.

On the south of Mainpuri is the railway, along with the train station. Mainpuri railway station was deliberately built in the middle of an unproductive usar plain so it wouldn't take away from the available farmland.

The main street in Mainpuri is a section of the Agra road running east–west through town. This is the main commercial centre and many of the public buildings are built here. The Bhanwat road branches off from the main road and heads south to the train station.

Mainpuri historically consisted of two separate settlements: Mainpuri Khas, the old town, in the north and surrounding the raja's garhi (fort-palace complex); and Mukhamganj, or Ganj, further south on the main road. The Katra road historically marked the southern boundary of Mainpuri Khas. Mainpuri Khas was historically surrounded by a wall, with six gates. The names of five are known: the Debi, Tal, Madar, Deoraya, and Ganesh Darwazas. The name of the sixth is not recorded. Nagaria, a suburb of Mainpuri, is near where the Tal Darwaza once stood.

=== Climate ===
Climate data for Mainpuri (1981–2010, extremes 1901–2005)
Month	Jan	Feb	Mar	Apr	May	Jun	Jul	Aug	Sep	Oct	Nov	Dec	Year
Record high °C (°F)	31.4 (88.5)	35.2 (95.4)	41.7 (107.1)	45.8 (114.4)	49.2 (120.6)	49.2 (120.6)	46.2 (115.2)	42.6 (108.7)	42.4 (108.3)	40.6 (105.1)	37.6 (99.7)	33.0 (91.4)	49.2 (120.6)
Mean daily maximum °C (°F)	22.7 (72.9)	26.0 (78.8)	31.5 (88.7)	38.3 (100.9)	41.0 (105.8)	40.3 (104.5)	35.2 (95.4)	33.4 (92.1)	33.7 (92.7)	33.5 (92.3)	29.4 (84.9)	24.7 (76.5)	32.4 (90.3)
Mean daily minimum °C (°F)	7.1 (44.8)	9.6 (49.3)	14.7 (58.5)	21.0 (69.8)	25.4 (77.7)	26.7 (80.1)	25.4 (77.7)	25.0 (77.0)	24.2 (75.6)	19.8 (67.6)	13.8 (56.8)	8.4 (47.1)	18.4 (65.1)
Record low °C (°F)	−1.7 (28.9)	−0.6 (30.9)	5.0 (41.0)	10.7 (51.3)	15.6 (60.1)	17.6 (63.7)	16.8 (62.2)	18.6 (65.5)	8.2 (46.8)	9.6 (49.3)	2.2 (36.0)	−1.1 (30.0)	−1.7 (28.9)
Average rainfall mm (inches)	11.3 (0.44)	13.5 (0.53)	8.5 (0.33)	5.7 (0.22)	14.8 (0.58)	71.3 (2.81)	207.7 (8.18)	233.6 (9.20)	159.7 (6.29)	33.4 (1.31)	3.4 (0.13)	6.0 (0.24)	768.9 (30.27)
Average rainy days	1.1	1.0	0.9	0.5	1.5	3.4	9.1	10.0	7.1	1.8	0.4	0.6	37.4
Average relative humidity (%) (at 17:30 IST)	71	62	53	32	33	43	64	73	71	65	67	73	59
Source: India Meteorological Department

== History ==
According to tradition, a branch of the Chauhan Rajputs came to Mainpuri from Asauli under one Raja Partab Rudr sometime between 1363 and 1391 (1420-1448 samvat). They were accompanied by fighters from the Mathuriya Brahmans, who later became merchants instead.

A new site called Mukhamganj, which is now the main part of town, was founded in 1746 by Raja Jaswant Singh on the Grand Trunk Road. It was named after Mukham Singh, who is variously recorded as a son of Jaswant's who was born out of wedlock or as his own childless brother. The new town quickly grew as people moved here from the town of Karimganj, further north. Mukhamganj quickly eclipsed Karimganj, which dwindled from a large town to a smaller village.

In 1802, the British founded a civil station just east of Mainpuri to serve as the headquarters of the new Etawah district. The civil station consisted of three settlements: Gola Bazar, Nagla Chamaran, and Nagla Pazawa. Due to its position as an administrative headquarters, the entire town of Mainpuri quickly grew. In 1804, it was attacked and pillaged by forces under Yashwant Rao Holkar, the Maratha ruler of Indore.

Major construction was done in Mainpuri from 1848 to 1850, involving the Raikesganj marketplace and a school, and again in the 1870s, involving three marketplaces, a post office, more schools, and a drainage system for the city. The three marketplaces built in the 1870s included one for vegetable produce, one for ghee and cotton, and one, called Laneganj after its builder, for grain. Laneganj, which replaced Raikesganj as the city's main grain market, stretched from the Raikesganj sarai in the south to the intersection of the Katra and Kuraoli roads in the north, on the border with Mainpuri Khas. A large masonry tank was also built next to the Laneganj market, with a stone chhatri at each corner. In the hotter part of the year, the tank was fed by a canal coming up to the town from the south, where it ultimately branched off from the Nagaria distributary.

At the turn of the 20th century, there was still a large open area between the town of Mainpuri and the train station to the south. There was a brickyard in this area. At the east end of town was a cotton ginning mill. There were about 20 makers of tarkashi work (wood inlaid with brass wire) in the city at the time. In terms of commerce, there was an active trade in cotton, grain, iron, and vegetables.

At this time, Mainpuri was divided into four wards (two in Mainpuri Khas and two in Mukhamganj). The wards in Mainpuri Khas were Misrana, comprising the mohallas Katra, Misrana, and Chautiana; and Purohitana, comprising the mohallas Purohitana, Sotiana, Baghban, and Bharatwal. The wards in Mukhamganj were Chhapaiti, comprising the mohallas Agarwala, Lohai, and Chhapaiti; and Gariwan, comprising the mohallas Gariwan, Saraogian, and Dariba.

As of the 1901 census, the city of Mainpuri had a population of exactly 19,000 (not counting the civil station, which had a population of exactly 1,000). The population was 73% Hindu (13,955) and 23% Muslim (4,436); the remaining 3% (609) followed other religions. Sometime between 1901 and 1910, the city limits were expanded southward to include the train station.

== Demographics ==
Historical population
Year	Pop.	±%
1901	19,000	—
1911	17,653	−7.1%
1921	15,697	−11.1%
1931	16,483	+5.0%
1941	21,221	+28.7%
1951	22,932	+8.1%
1961	33,610	+46.6%
1971	43,849	+30.5%
1981	58,928	+34.4%
1991	76,735	+30.2%
2001	104,851	+36.6%
2011	136,557	+30.2%
Source: 2011 Census of India

Religions in Mainpuri city (2011)
Religion	Percent
Hindus	87.95%
Muslims	10.44%
Jains	0.71%
Distribution of religions

As of the 2011 census, Mainpuri had a population of 136,557, in 24,498 households. This population was 52.2% male (71,274) and 47.8% female (65,283). The 0-6 age group numbered 17,360 (9,276 male and 8,084 female), or 12.7% of the total population. 22,540 residents were members of Scheduled Castes, or 16.5% of the total. The town's literacy rate was 83.4% (counting only people age 7 and up).

== Notable temples ==
There are several ancient and well-known Hindu temples in the city. These include Sheetla Devi Temple which hosts a 20-day rural exhibition-cum-trade fair every year in March/April. Bhimsen Mandir is an ancient Shiva temple and Falahari Ashram situated on Jyoti-Devi Road has very a rare statue of the goddess Durga with 18 arms. Another ancient Shiv temple is Chandeshwar Mandir situated on Chandeshwar Road. Also located on Devi Road are the twin Shiv temples of Kale Mahadev and Shweat Mahadev. Hanuman Temple situated on old Tehsil Road is visited by thousands on Tuesdays and Saturdays.

== Industry ==
Cotton ginning, oilseed milling, lamp and glass manufacturing constitute the prominent industries. Peanut farming is a small but well-spread out industry. The town is also renowned for its tobacco and wooden sculptures. A large amount of the population depends on agriculture produce to fulfill daily needs. The agricultural equipment industry is predominant — Siyaram Agency is one of the leading equipment manufacturers in the district.

=== Tarkashi ===
Mainpuri is renowned for its woodwork inlaid with brass wire, a process known as tarkashi (literally "wire-drawing"). Dark shisham wood is the main type of wood used, and some of the items commonly decorated in this way are footwear, plates and trays, various small boxes, and photo frames. Tarkashi items are made by gently hammering brass strips into chiselled-out incisions in the wood. A stencil is used to mark out complex designs beforehand. Tarkashi work is typically a slow process – a plate with a 30 cm diameter can take up to 20 days – so the items tend to be relatively expensive.

== Places of interest ==
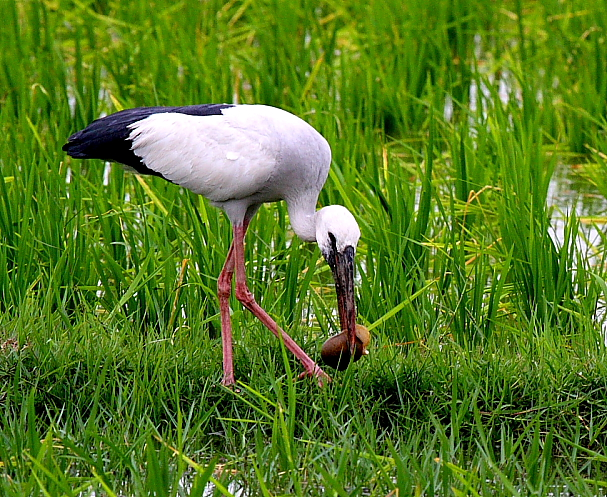
Krouncha, sarus crane (Grus antigone)

Fort/Garhi of Mainpuri is situated at old Mainpuri. The fort is not a spot of tourist interest. It is the private property of erstwhile raja of two estates, Mainpuri and Lawan (Dausa, Rajasthan) and repaired, maintained and restored by him.

Attractions include the parks Phoolbagh and Lohia Park. Phoolbagh is situated at Jail Chauraha while Lohia Park is situated at District Collectorate. Both have green lawns and fountains.

Mainpuri is also known for the sarus crane (Grus antigone). This bird, called krouncha in India, is revered as a symbol of marital fidelity and is celebrated in myth and legend. There are estimated to be 8,000-10,000 sarus cranes in India. Two-thirds of its population resides in the villages Harwai, Andani of Karhal.

Another place of interest in the Mainpuri District is the Saman Bird Sanctuary. The Siberian crane comes here in its migration cycle and stays for 3–4 months from November to February. Part-time wildlife photographer Mr. Shashank Raghav has contributed his photos to depict the wildlife of the Mainpuri District, especially the different species of birds which can be found in nearby areas of the Saman Bird Sanctuary within the Mainpuri district.

== Healthcare ==
The district hospital is called Maharaja Tej Singh Jila Chikitsalya. Mainpuri Janch Kendra is a Registered Pathology in the district in the fields of biotechnology and biochemistry. Mainpuri District has a very high number of cancer patients due to consumption of kapuri (camphor) flavoured tobacco.

== Education ==
As of 2009, Mainpuri has 61 schools teaching at the primary level, 11 schools teaching at the secondary level, and 4 public libraries.

=== Engineering College ===
Government Engineering College, Mainpuri(खर्रा)) (Rajkiya Engineering College, REC) is a government engineering college in Mainpuri. It is a constituent college of Dr. A.P.J. Abdul Kalam Technical University (formerly Uttar Pradesh Technical University) in Lucknow. The college has four branches: computer science, civil, electrical, and mechanical with 63 students in each branch. REC is situated at Shikohabad - Mainpuri Road. There is one government polytechnic college. It has three branches of engineering, electronics, microprocessors and instrumentation and control. It is located at Sindhiya Tiraha near new Mandi.

== Accessibility ==
Mainpuri is well-connected to other parts of the state by road and broad-gauge railway so one can visit Mainpuri by train, at Mainpuri railway station. Currently, the only two trains are the Kalindi Express and the Kanpur Anand Vihar Express, which connect Mainpuri to Delhi and Kanpur. The city is also linked by railways to Farrukhabad and Shikohabad, Etawah and Kanpur. Major cities within a 300-kilometre (190 mi) range of Mainpuri include Agra, Delhi, Bareilly, Meerut, Firozabad, Shikohabad, Etawah, Jhansi, Gwalior and Kanpur.

The Agra Lucknow Expressway connects Mainpuri to Lucknow.

The closest civil airport is at Agra, which is 121 km away.

== See also ==
- List of cities in Uttar Pradesh
- Mainpuri (Lok Sabha Constituency)
- List of Villages in Mainpuri District
