= Mainpuri district =

Coordinates: 27°10′N 79°00′E

- District of Uttar Pradesh
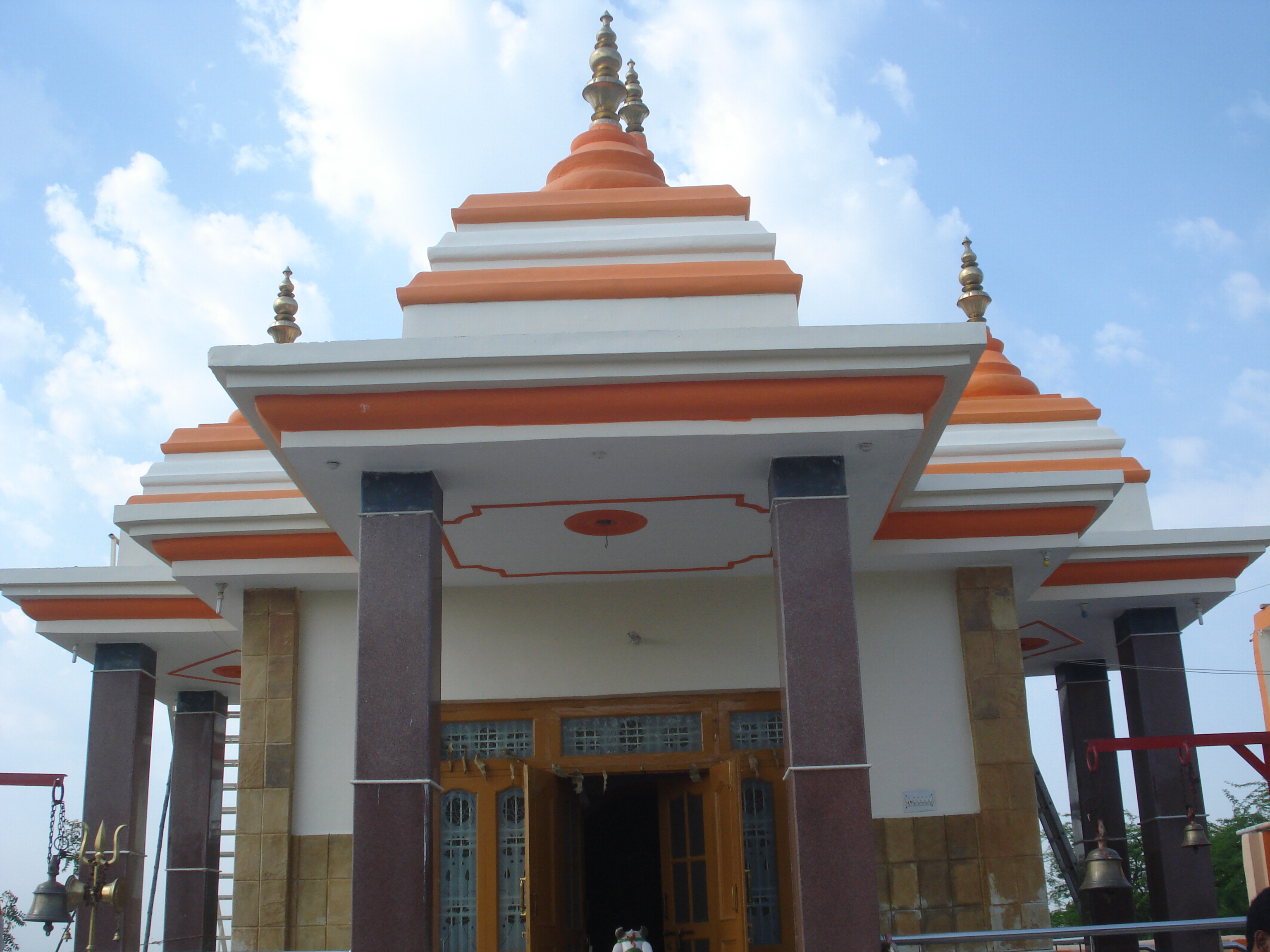
- Rameshwar Dham Shiv Mandir, Dilaha

- Location of Mainpuri district in Uttar Pradesh
- Country: India
- State: Uttar Pradesh
- Division: Agra
- Established: 1837
- Headquarters: Mainpuri
- Tehsils: 6

Government
  - Lok Sabha constituencies: Mainpuri

Area
  - Total: 2,745 km^{2} (1,060 sq mi)

Population (2011)
  - Total: 1,868,529
  - Density: 680.7/km^{2} (1,763/sq mi)

Demographics
  - Literacy: 78.26%.
- Time zone: UTC+05:30 (IST)
- Website: http://mainpuri.nic.in/

Mainpuri district (Hindi pronunciation: [mɛːn̪.pʊɾiː]) is one of the districts in the Agra division of Uttar Pradesh, India. Mainpuri town is the district headquarters. Mainpuri is located in the southwestern part of Uttar Pradesh, within the Agra division. It is situated in the Ganges-Yamuna Doab region. It consists of six tehsils, namely Mainpuri, Bhongaon, Karhal, Kishni, Kurawali and Ghiror.

Mainpuri forms part of the ancient legendary region of Lord Krishna's land called Braj. It is bounded on the north by Etah district, on the east by the districts Farrukhabad and Kannauj, on the south by Etawah district and on the west by the districts Firozabad and Etah. It lies between north latitude 260 53′ to 270 31′ and east longitude 780 27′ to 790 26′. According to the 2011 census, Mainpuri district has a population of 1,847,194. The district has a population density of 670 inhabitants per square kilometre (1,700/sq mi). Mainpuri has a sex ratio of 876 females for every 1000 males, and a literacy rate of 78.26%.

== History ==
Several copper harpoons and antenna swords have been found in Ganeshpur village in 2022 which are from Copper Hoard Culture. The region was part of Dakshina Panchala, with its capital at Kampilya in the nearby Farrukhabad district. Ruled by the Nandas, Mauryas, Shungas, Kanvas, Kushanas, the Panchala region gained immense prosperity under the Guptas. Not much mention is made of the region until the time of the Maukharis and later Harsha. From this time, the region was ruled by dynasties centred at Kannauj, particularly the Gurjara-Pratiharas. After their fall, a period of brief anarchy followed in the district until the rise of the Gahadavala dynasty in the late 11th century. After Mohammad Ghori defeated Jayachandra, the last king of Kannauj, the region was divided into a number of petty principalities, of which Rapri and Bhongaon were chief. These principalities initially attempted to resist the consolidation of authority under the Sultans of Delhi, but were unsuccessful. Qutubuddin Aibak made Rapri in neighbouring Firozabad district the centre of an iqta tax farming grant, which remained an important centre for centuries to come. Bhongaon was given as fief to Malik Sher Khan, nephew of Balban, in 1259 and was held for one year. Malik Kafur held Rapri as fief under Alauddin Khilji.

In 1392 Bir Bhan, the Muqqadam of Bhongaon, rose in revolt against the Sultan Muhammad Shah Tughluq, which was crushed by the vizier. However the next year he, along with Sarvadharan and Abhai Chand, two other nobles, he rose in revolt again. The revolt was only ended when Mukarrab-ul-Mulk, governor of Jalesar, murdered two of the ringleaders under the pretext of peace talks. Eventually the territory up to Rapri fell under the rule of the Jaunpur Sultanate. During the struggle between Delhi and Jaunpur after the invasion of Timur, the Hindu chiefs of Mainpuri again tried to declare indpenedence and were crushed. In 1420, Taj-ul-Mulk, vizier of Khizr Khan, sacked Mainpuri when suppressing the rebellion of more Hindu chiefs of the district and destroyed their stronghold of Dhiluli.

During the reign of Alauddin Alam Shah, one Rai Pratap of Bhongaon instigated the Sultan to try to execute his vizier, whose father had carried off his wife. The vizier instead offered the crown to Bahlul Lodhi and forced the Sayyid dynasty out of power, although Rai Pratap was still confirmed in his position. The district remained at the frontier of the Delhi and Jaunpur sultans, but was not much mentioned. After Babur's conquest of Delhi and the anarchy that followed his death, the region fell under the Suri Empire, and was reconquered by the Mughals. In 1562, Akbar himself was injured in this district when trying to quell resistance from the people of Paronkha village. During his time, the present area of the district was in Agra Subah, divided between the pargana of Ghiror in Agra sarkar, and the mahals of Bhongaon, Patti Alipur, Sauj, Tais, part of Etawah, and Kuraoli, most of which was controlled by Rajputs. The region's status remained relatively unchanged until the death of Aurangzeb in 1707.

The region then fell under the control of Muhammad Khan Bangash, an Afghan noble who aided Farrukhsiyar become Mughal emperor, and remained under his rule until his death in 1743. Afterwards the Marathas took control of the area, until the Third Battle of Panipat when it ended up part of the Rohilla possessions, before being taken by the Nawab of Awadh. The Marathas retook the region in 1770, but were soon expelled by Awadh and the British in 1774, and the region was ruled by the Nawab until 1801. During the Second Anglo-Maratha War in 1804, Yashwantrao Holkar attacked Mainpuri.

When this part of the country was ceded to the British in 1801, Mainpuri town became the headquarters of the extensive district of Etawah, which covered much of the middle Doab with tehsils Shikohabad, Huzur, Sakit, Kasganj and Etawah. Soon after 1803, Sauj pargana was transferred to Farrukhabad, and the tehsils were placed under subcollectorates. In 1827, Kuraoli was transferred from Farrukhabad, as was Bewar in 1840. In 1824 a separate Karhal pargana was created and the Rapri pargana was divided into a Shikohabad pargana and two other parganas: Mustafabad and Ghiror, and the Manchhana pargana was formed out of Bhongaon. In 1837, Mainpuri was separated from Etawah district and in 1845 the Etah district was formed out of the three northern parganas of the district. In 1850 Manchhana taluk was re-merged with Bhongaon. In 1861, Sauj pargana was divided between Karhal and Mainpuri. Small land transfers were made to Farrukhabad, Etawah and Etah districts in 1957, and in 1961 some land was transferred from Farrukhabad district to Mainpuri district.

On the outbreak of the Rebellion in 1857 and receipt of the news of the mutiny of troops in Aligarh, the regiment stationed at Mainpuri revolted and attacked the town in late May, parts of which were defended by the few Europeans of the station and some loyal Indian troops led by Zamindar Rao Bhawani Singh. Mainpuri remained under slowly faltering British control for longer than the surrounding districts until the end of June, when the British authority completely collapsed. The arrival of a force of Jhansi mutineers on June 29 made it necessary to abandon the district to the care of Raja Tej Singh, who claimed to be loyal, and they opened the jail with some of his uncle Bhawani Singh's men who joined the revolt. However Bhawani Singh himself remained loyal, as he benefited from the earlier seizure of his nephew's land by the British. When more revolutionaries from Sagar arrived, the Raja set up his revolutionary administration. Tej Singh suppressed the Ahir zamindars of Bharaul and made alliance with the Nawab of Farrukhabad. In October, the British tried to reconquer the middle Doab but once they left, Tej Singh returned to take over the region by December. However a British force soon beat him near Kuraoli, forcing them to retreat and allowing the British to reoccupy Mainpuri. The district was under full British control again by late 1858.

In 1915, Dammi Lai, Karori Lai Gupta, Sidh Gopal Chatiuvedi, Gopinath, Prabhakar Pande, Chandradhar Jauhri and Shiv Kishan along with Genda Lal Dixit of Etawah attempted to organise armed revolution. Their trial in 1915 at Mainpuri, known as the Mainpuri Conspiracy Case, galvanized support for the revolution. In 1921, Thakur Digvijay Singh, a local leader, addressed a rally supporting the boycott of foreign products. A 'Nau Jawan Bharat Sabha' was formed where Bhagat Singh and Chandra Shekhar Azad allegedly attended in disguise. Gandhi and Nehru came to Mainpuri. The district participated in all the major events of the Independence movement, including the non-cooperation movement. In 1989, the Jasrana and Shikohabad tehsils were made part of the new Firozabad district.

Kak Nadi, Senghar Nadi, and Sehar Nadi were some of the rivers in the area which have since dried up.

== Administration ==
The Mainpuri district is headed by an IAS officer of the rank of District Magistrate (DM). The district is further sub-divided into sub-divisions or Tehsils, each headed by a Sub Divisional Magistrate (SDM).

These Tehsils are further divided into Blocks, each headed by a Block development officer (BDO).

=== Tehsils ===
The six sub-divisions or Tehsils in Mainpuri are as follows:

1. Mainpuri
2. Bhogaon
3. Karhal
4. Kishni
5. Ghiror
6. Kurawali

=== Blocks ===
The nine Blocks in Mainpuri are as follows:

1. Mainpuri
2. Ghiror
3. Bewar
4. Jagir
5. Sultanganj
6. Karhal
7. Kurawali
8. Kishni
9. Barnahal

== Geography ==
The district generally gives the appearance of an extensive level plain broken only by the sand ridges on the western border, the rolling sand hills and undulations of the Kali and Isan rivers, and the ravines along the Yamuna to the southwest. The Kali Nadi forms the boundary of this plain on the north and northeast and the Yamuna encloses it on the southwest. Both these rivers flow towards the southeast and between them. The general slope of the country is from northwest to southeast, taking the district from north to south.

Generally speaking, the soils of the district are typical of those found elsewhere in the Indo-Gangetic plain, and are classified on two principles according to whether the distinctions recognised are natural or artificial. Both are well-understood and commonly employed by the cultivator. Of the natural divisions bhur is the name for soil containing a large proportion of sand, while matyar is the name of soil containing a large proportion of clay. Between these two is a loamy soil called domat with clay and sand more evenly divided. A lighter soil is known as pilia, coming between domal and bhur. The barren soil known as usher is found at the heads and partly down the courses of the smaller rivers such as Ahnaiya and Puraha, the Sengar and Arind and the numerous minor esteems. It appears to be a clay deposit too compact to permit cultivation in places too impregnated with Reh and other deleterious mineral substances to permit the growth of even grass.

Wasteland: The barren land consists for the most part of usar plains.

Forests: The total area covered in the district is 2,154 hectares (5,320 acres). A considerable area of the barren land is covered with dark jungle. A great deal of wasteland is covered with the coarse grass known locally as ganra (gandhar) or sinkh. Ganra is used for thatching and making ropes and mats. The babul grows in large clumps on the usar plains and is, indeed, the only tree which flourishes on them. Its cultivation has for some time been encouraged by the increase of moisture due to the canals and the great demand for wood both for fuel and carpentry. Its timber is hard and close-grained and is used for building purposes, fuel and charcoal.

== Water Bodies ==
=== Kali Nadi ===
The Kali Nadi forms the northeastern boundary of the district separating it from Etah and Farukkhabad. It is a narrow stream, but perennial, and even during the spring and summer months is only fordable at certain places. There is a bridge with a 545-foot span on the Farukkhabad Road.

=== Isan Nadi ===
Next to the Kali comes the Isan, which is here a considerable stream, fordable only in a few places during the rainy season. During the remainder of the year the volume of running water is small, and in years of unusual drought there is no apparent stream, but the pools that remain are fed by the springs. During the first part of its course and to within four miles of its junction with Kali Nadi about three miles northwest of Mainpuri, it runs through a loam and usar country, has a comparatively shallow bed, and often overflows the neighbouring lands in times of flooding.

=== The Arind or Rind ===
The Arind (or Rind as it is called further down its course) is an insignificant stream in this district, which it enters to the north of pargana Mustafabad, between the Etawah and Kanpur branches of the Ganges Canal, and traverses in an exceedingly sinuous course from the northwest to the southeast corner. A straight line from its point of entry to its point of exit is almost the longest which could be drawn on the district map. It presents a striking contrast to the Kali and Isan.

=== Lakes ===
Mainpuri abounds in swamps and marshes, particularly in its central portion, but few of them are of sufficient size or permanence to be considered lakes. Mention will only be made here of the more considerable ones, and for the others reference should be made to the accounts of parganas. In all 36,870 acres are recorded in the revenue record as underwater, even the largest, as they are seldom supplied by springs. There is also a long narrow lake of considerable size to the southwest of Mainpuri city, between it and the Kanpur branch of the Ganges canal, which drains by two cuts towards the Isan.

=== Drainage ===
The general slope of the country, is from northwest to southeast, and this is the direction in which the rivers run and which is therefore followed in the main by the drainage. There are however, numerous inequalities of surface caused by the greater or less elevation of the river beds and by sand bridges, and the general disposition of the drainage differs somewhat in different portions of the district. In the center tract, which lies highest, the main drainage arteries are the Isan and the Arind. Pargana Karhal has been seriously affected by the canal. The Kali and Isan and their catchment basins all belong to the Ganges system, and all the other rivers to that of the Yamuna.

== Demographics ==
Historical population
Year	Pop.	±% p.a.
1901	509,051	—
1911	489,575	−0.39%
1921	459,132	−0.64%
1931	460,118	+0.02%
1941	535,595	+1.53%
1951	610,041	+1.31%
1961	726,012	+1.76%
1971	880,629	+1.95%
1981	1,057,344	+1.85%
1991	1,311,026	+2.17%
2001	1,596,718	+1.99%
2011	1,868,529	+1.58%

According to the 2011 census Mainpuri district has a population of 1,868,529, roughly equal to the nation of Kosovo or the US state of West Virginia. This gives it a ranking of 255th in India (out of a total of 640). The district has a population density of 670 inhabitants per square kilometre (1,700/sq mi). Its population growth rate over the decade 2001-2011 was 15.69%. Mainpuri has a sex ratio of 876 females for every 1000 males, and a literacy rate of 78.26%. 15.44% of the population lived in urban areas. Scheduled Castes made up 19.71% of the population. Hindi and Braj Bhasha is the predominant language, spoken by 59.22% and 40.28 of the population.

Religions in Mainpuri district (2011)
Religion	Percent
Hinduism	93.48%
Islam	5.39%
Buddhism	0.47%
Other or not stated	0.66%
Distribution of religions

Mainpuri is a predominantly Hindu district, with Muslims as the largest minority. In rural areas Hindus are nearly 96% of the population. There are around 8,800 Buddhists in the district.

In Mainpuri, the total population is approximately 12.3 lakh and 35 percent of this population is composed of Yadav caste. Other dominant castes of the district are Shakyas, Thakurs, Brahmins, SCs and Muslims.

=== Amenities ===
All the following tables are as of 2011.

==== Drinking water ====
The following table shows how households get their main source of drinking water:

Source of drinking water	Rural	Urban	Total
Tap water (treated source)	12.71%	31.44%	15.65%
Tap water (untreated source)	4.01%	8.08%	4.65%
Well (covered or uncovered)	1.36%	0.57%	1.23%
Hand pump	81.3%	52.1%	76.7%
Tube well/borehole	0.34%	6.87%	1.37%
All others	0.3%	0.9%	0.39%

==== Lighting ====
The following table shows how households get their main source of lighting:

Type of lighting	Rural	Urban	Total
Electricity	16.4%	73.7%	25.4%
Kerosene	82.3%	24.9%	73.3%
Solar	0.6%	0.1%	0.5%
Other oil	0.4%	0.35%	0.39%
All others	0.2%	0.36%	0.2%
No lighting	0.12%	0.54%	0.19%

==== Toilets ====
The following table shows how households mainly go to the bathroom:

Toilet	Rural	Urban	Total
Flush/pour toilet, connected to sewer system	0.9%	6.6%	1.8%
Flush/pour toilet, connected to septic tank	7.35%	62.6%	16.0%
Other flush/pour toilet	1.2%	2.1%	1.35%
Pit latrine, with slab/ventilated improved	3.0%	1.7%	2.8%
Pit latrine, without slab/open	0.51%	0.44%	0.5%
Night soil (disposed of by self or others)	0.48%	1.97%	0.7%
No toilet at home, use public toilets instead	1.1%	0.8%	1.0%
Open defecation	85.5%	23.8%	75.8%

==== Possessions ====
The following table sorts households by whether they have the following possessions:

Item	Rural	Urban	Total
Radio	16.6%	13.3%	16.2%
Television	18.5%	58.1%	24.67%
Computer (with internet)	0.5%	2.6%	0.9%
Computer (without internet)	6.7%	8.7%	7.0%
Cell phone	61.9%	68.8%	63.0%
Bicycle	72.0%	56.5%	69.5%
Scooter/motorcycle/moped	14.9%	29.3%	17.2%
Car	1.7%	6.0%	2.4%
None of the above	12.0%	11.9%	12.0%

== Culture ==
The ethnic city Mainpuri was ruled by the Mughals, Marathas, Afghans and Nawabs in various time periods. Among them, the Mughal and Nawabs vastly influenced the culture of the city. Music, dance, architecture, arts and crafts flourished under their rule. Hindus, Muslims, Jains, Buddhists, Christians and Sikhs were the principal communities residing in the city. How festival created unity among Hindus and Muslims is a question? The Hindu culture of the joint family system was once adored in the city, which has slowly disintegrated due to rapid industrial development, urban development, economic issues and social features.

The rituals of the Vedic religion manifest themselves in the various festivals that are celebrated in this city. People usually do not consume non-vegetarian food on Thursdays. Its annual Janardhan Swami Temple, and Sivagiri Mutt festivals feature vibrant colors and spiritual expression. These festivals which last for days attract locals and tourists alike by the thousands. On Tuesdays the city celebrates the birth day of Lord Hanuman. Devotees flock to the local temples to offer prayers. The city fair is held at Sheetla Devi Temple in March or April; the nine days of worshiping the various avatars of the goddess Durga (i.e. Chaitra Navratri) occurs during these months. During these nine days, many of the locals also keep fasts where they eat only fruits during this period and men do not shave their beards or mustaches.

1. Languages in Mainpuri : About two dozen languages were present in Mainpuri by 1971. At present about 97% of people speak Hindi, 2% muslims speak Urdu and the remaining 1% who came from Pakistan and Bangladesh speak other languages such as Bengali, Sindhi, Punjabi, and English. The Hindi dialect forms Braj Bhasha, Bhadauri and Bundeli are also spoken in the city.
2. Arts in Mainpuri: Traditional art such as wooden sculptures, glassware, classic zari-worked silk sarees, pottery, rugs, and chikan embroidery depict Mainpuri culture and are available in the markets. Most of the Mainpuri arts and craft forms depict the Mughal designs. Hindustani, Ghazal and Qauwwali music are the traditional forms of music enjoyed by Mainpuris. The rasiya genre which portrays the divine love of Lord Krishna and Radha is also popular. Classical and folk dance such as Kathak and Charukala symbolise the cultural heritage of the city and state. The play Ramlila which describes the life of Lord Rama is staged during festive seasons.
3. Fairs in Mainpuri: Cultural fairs, religious fairs and trade fairs are popular as they invite people of all backgrounds to celebrate. With Mainpuri being the district headquarters, the fairs attract large number of visitors and tourists from around the district. Fairs are also common during the festival seasons like Dusshera and Ramlila. The Devji fair in the village of Uddetpur under Mainpuri Tehsil falls on Chaitra and attracts nearly 20,000 people. The village Bidhuna hosts the biggest bathing fair in Mainpuri to celebrate Kaitiki purnima, which brings a lot of devotees to the area. Mainpuri hosts the Kans ka mela on Chaitra and the popular Narain ka mela which attracts nearly 10,000 people. The 20-day exhibition-cum-trade fair organised at Sheetla Mata Mandir on April in Udetpur Abhai village is also popular. Fairs in gurudwaras on the occasion of Baisakhi are also attended by people of all religions and castes.
4. Notable temples: The city has some very old and popular Hindu temples. These include Sheetla Devi Temple, where every year during March/April, a rural exhibition-cum-trade fair is held for 20 days. Bhimsen Mandir is an ancient Shiva temple and Falahari Ashram situated on Jyoti-Devi Road has very a rare statue of the goddess Durga with 18 arms. Another ancient Shiv temple is Chandeshwar Mandir situated on Chandeshwar Road. Also located on Devi Road are the twin Shiv temples of Kale Mahadev and Shweat Mahadev. Hanuman Temple situated on old Tehsil Road is visited by thousands on Tuesdays and Saturdays.

== Economy ==
The primary exports from Mainpuri district are agricultural products: wheat, pulses, potatoes, oilseeds and oil, rice, and ghee. Fish are also exported to Kolkata. Some manufactured goods are also exported: glassware, lightbulbs, and leather products. Major imports include cloth, chemicals, utensils, fertilizers, electrical goods, paper, and fuels like petrol and kerosene, as well as general consumer goods. The main commercial centres in Mainpuri district are Shikohabad, Bewar, Kusmara, Sirsaganj, and Ghiror.

== Places of interest ==
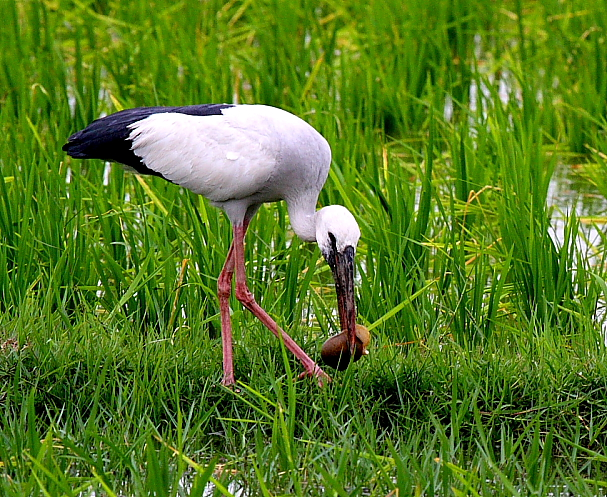
Krouncha, sarus crane (Grus antigone)

Fort/Garhi of Mainpuri is situated at old Mainpuri. The fort is not a spot of tourist interest. It is the private property of erstwhile raja of two estates, Mainpuri and Lawan (Dausa, Rajasthan) and repaired, maintained and restored by him.

Attractions include the parks Phoolbagh and Lohia Park. Phoolbagh is situated at Jail Chauraha while Lohia Park is situated at District Collectorate. Both have green lawns and fountains.

Mainpuri is also known for the sarus crane (Grus antigone). This bird, called krouncha in India, is revered as a symbol of marital fidelity and is celebrated in myth and legend. There are estimated to be 8,000-10,000 sarus cranes in India. Two-thirds of its population resides in the village Andani of Karhal.

Another place of interest in the Mainpuri District is the Saman Bird Sanctuary. The Siberian crane comes here in its migration cycle and stays for 3–4 months from November to February. Part-time wildlife photographer Mr. Shashank Raghav has contributed his photos to depict the wildlife of the Mainpuri District, especially the different species of birds which can be found in nearby areas of the Saman Bird Sanctuary within the Mainpuri district.

== Education ==
Government Engineering College, Mainpuri is a government engineering college in Mainpuri. It is a constituent college of Dr. A.P.J. Abdul Kalam Technical University (formerly Uttar Pradesh Technical University) in Lucknow.

== See also ==
- List of villages in Mainpuri district
