= Karpiya =

Village in Uttar Pradesh, India

- Village
- Location in Uttar Pradesh, India
- Coordinates: 27.22555°N 79.25194°E
- Country: India
- State: Uttar Pradesh
- District: Mainpuri
- Tehsil: Bhongaon

Area
  - Total: 3.965 km^{2} (1.531 sq mi)

Population (2011)
  - Total: 2,025
  - Density: 510.7/km^{2} (1,323/sq mi)
- Time zone: UTC+5:30 (IST)

Karpiya (Karpiyā), also spelled Karpia, is a village in Bewar block of Mainpuri district, Uttar Pradesh, India. As of 2011, it had a population of 2,025, in 385 households.

== Demographics ==
As of 2011, Karpiya had a population of 2,025, in 385 households. This population was 54.3% male (1,100) and 45.7% female (925). The 0-6 age group numbered 337 (202 male and 135 female), or 16.6% of the total population. 585 residents were members of Scheduled Castes, or 28.9% of the total.

The 1981 census recorded Karpiya as having a population of 1,463 people, in 251 households.

The 1961 census recorded Karpiya as comprising 2 hamlets, with a total population of 1,135 people (619 male and 516 female), in 204 households and 160 physical houses. The area of the village was given as 991 acres and it was then counted as part of Allau block.

== Infrastructure ==
As of 2011, Karpiya had 2 primary schools; it did not have any healthcare facilities. Drinking water was provided by well, hand pump, and tube well/borehole; there were no public toilets. The village had a post office but no public library; there was at least some access to electricity for all purposes. Streets were made of both kachcha and pakka materials.
