= Jalalpur, Bewar =

Village in Uttar Pradesh, India

Jalalpur
- Village
- Location in Uttar Pradesh, India
- Coordinates: 27.26745°N 79.24333°E
- Country: India
- State: Uttar Pradesh
- District: Mainpuri
- Tehsil: Bhongaon

Area
  - Total: 1.286 km^{2} (0.497 sq mi)

Population (2011)
  - Total: 1,006
  - Density: 782.3/km^{2} (2,026/sq mi)
- Time zone: UTC+5:30 (IST)

Jalalpur (Jalālpur) is a village in Bewar block of Mainpuri district, Uttar Pradesh. As of 2011, it has a population of 1,006, in 178 households.

== Demographics ==
As of 2011, Jalalpur had a population of 1,006, in 178 households. This population was 50.7% male (510) and 49.3% female (496). The 0-6 age group numbered 176 (76 male and 100 female), or 17.5% of the total population. 150 residents were members of Scheduled Castes, or 14.9% of the total.

The 1981 census recorded Jalalpur as having a population of 558 people, in 102 households.

The 1961 census recorded Jalalpur as comprising 1 hamlet, with a total population of 369 people (207 male and 162 female), in 68 households and 24 physical houses. The area of the village was given as 346 acres; it was then counted as part of Allau block.

== Infrastructure ==
As of 2011, Jalalpur had 1 primary school; it did not have any healthcare facilities. Drinking water was provided by hand pump and tube well/borehole; there were no public toilets. The village had a post office but no public library; there was at least some access to electricity for all purposes. Streets were made of pakka materials.
