= Naurangabad, Mainpuri =

Village in Uttar Pradesh, India

Naurangabad
- Village
- Location in Uttar Pradesh, India
- Coordinates: 27.24702°N 79.21643°E
- Country: India
- State: Uttar Pradesh
- District: Mainpuri
- Tehsil: Bhongaon

Area
  - Total: 0.965 km^{2} (0.373 sq mi)

Population (2011)
  - Total: 663
  - Density: 687/km^{2} (1,780/sq mi)
- Time zone: UTC+5:30 (IST)

Naurangabad (Nauraṅgābād) is a village in Bewar block of Mainpuri district, Uttar Pradesh, India. As of 2011, it had a population of 663, in 93 households.

== Demographics ==
As of 2011, Naurangabad had a population of 663, in 93 households. This population was 51.6% male (342) and 48.4% female (321). The 0-6 age group numbered 94 (51 male and 43 female), or 14.2% of the total population. 2 residents were members of Scheduled Castes, or 0.03% of the total.

The 1981 census recorded Naurangabad as having a population of 379 people, in 59 households.

The 1961 census recorded Naurangabad as comprising 1 hamlet, with a total population of 239 people (116 male and 123 female), in 40 households and 33 physical houses. The area of the village was given as 189 acres; it was then counted as part of Allau block.

== Infrastructure ==
As of 2011, Naurangabad had 1 primary school; it did not have any healthcare facilities. Drinking water was provided by hand pump; there were no public toilets. The village had a post office but no public library; there was at least some access to electricity for all purposes. Streets were made of kachcha materials.
