= Jamaura =

Village in Uttar Pradesh, India

- Village
- Location in Uttar Pradesh, India
- Coordinates: 27.27416°N 79.19653°E
- Country: India
- State: Uttar Pradesh
- District: Mainpuri
- Tehsil: Bhongaon

Area
  - Total: 1.004 km^{2} (0.388 sq mi)

Population (2011)
  - Total: 1,673
  - Density: 1,666/km^{2} (4,316/sq mi)
- Time zone: UTC+5:30 (IST)

Jamaura (Jamaurā) is a village in Bewar block of Mainpuri district, Uttar Pradesh. As of 2011, it had a population of 1,673, in 289 households.

== Demographics ==
As of 2011, Jamaura had a population of 1,673, in 289 households. This population was 52.6% male (880) and 47.4% female (793). The 0-6 age group numbered 272 (133 male and 139 female), or 16.3% of the total population. 396 residents were members of Scheduled Castes, or 23.7% of the total.

The 1981 census recorded Jamaura as having a population of 1,165 people, in 93 households.

The 1961 census recorded Jamaura as comprising 1 hamlet, with a total population of 757 people (407 male and 350 female), in 156 households and 118 physical houses. The area of the village was given as 200 acres; it was then counted as part of Allau block.

== Infrastructure ==
As of 2011, Jamaura had 1 primary school; it did not have any healthcare facilities. Drinking water was provided by hand pump and tube well/borehole; there were no public toilets. The village had a post office but no public library; there was at least some access to electricity for all purposes. Streets were made of both kachcha and pakka materials.
