= Tigwan =

Village in Uttar Pradesh, India

- Village
- Location in Uttar Pradesh, India
- Coordinates: 27.27235°N 79.23913°E
- Country: India
- State: Uttar Pradesh
- District: Mainpuri
- Tehsil: Bhongaon

Area
  - Total: 1.388 km^{2} (0.536 sq mi)

Population (2011)
  - Total: 1,248
  - Density: 899.1/km^{2} (2,329/sq mi)
- Time zone: UTC+5:30 (IST)
- PIN: 205262

Tigwan (Tigwān) is a village in Bewar block of Mainpuri district, Uttar Pradesh, India. As of 2011, it had a population of 1,248, in 203 households.

== Demographics ==
As of 2011, Tigwan had a population of 1,248, in 203 households. This population was 54.0% male (674) and 46.0% female (574). The 0-6 age group numbered 168 (97 male and 71 female), or 13.5% of the total population. No residents were members of Scheduled Castes.

The 1981 census recorded Tigwan as having a population of 736 people, in 131 households.

The 1961 census recorded Tigwan as comprising 3 hamlets, with a total population of 538 people (296 male and 242 female), in 87 households and 70 physical houses. The area of the village was given as 384 acres; it was then counted as part of Allau block.

== Infrastructure ==
As of 2011, Tigwan had 1 primary school; it did not have any healthcare facilities. Drinking water was provided by hand pump and tube well/borehole; there were no public toilets. The village had a post office and public library, as well as at least some access to electricity for all purposes. Streets were made of both kachcha and pakka materials.
