= Tikuri =

Village in Uttar Pradesh, India

- Village
- Location in Uttar Pradesh, India
- Coordinates: 27.28579°N 79.26676°E
- Country: India
- State: Uttar Pradesh
- District: Mainpuri
- Tehsil: Bhongaon

Area
  - Total: 1.883 km^{2} (0.727 sq mi)

Population (2011)
  - Total: 1,225
  - Density: 650.6/km^{2} (1,685/sq mi)
- Time zone: UTC+5:30 (IST)

Tikuri (Ṭikurī) is a village in Bewar block of Mainpuri district, Uttar Pradesh, India. As of 2011, it had a population of 1,225, in 212 households.

== Demographics ==
As of 2011, Tikuri had a population of 1,225, in 212 households. This population was 54.0% male (661) and 46.0% female (564). The 0-6 age group numbered 205 (117 male and 88 female), or 16.7% of the total population. 393 residents were members of Scheduled Castes, or 32.1% of the total.

The 1981 census recorded Tikuri as having a population of 835 people, in 139 households.

The 1961 census recorded Tikuri as comprising 2 hamlets, with a total population of 636 people (362 male and 274 female), in 135 households and 111 physical houses. The area of the village was given as 536 acres; it was then counted as part of Allau block.

== Infrastructure ==
As of 2011, Tikuri had 1 primary school; it did not have any healthcare facilities. Drinking water was provided by hand pump; there were no public toilets. The village had a post office but no public library; there was at least some access to electricity for all purposes. Streets were made of kachcha materials.
