= Dayantnagar Mata =

Village in Uttar Pradesh, India

- Village
- Location in Uttar Pradesh, India
- Coordinates: 27.30059°N 79.28219°E
- Country: India
- State: Uttar Pradesh
- District: Mainpuri
- Tehsil: Bhongaon

Area
  - Total: 2.604 km^{2} (1.005 sq mi)

Population (2011)
  - Total: 1,657
  - Density: 636.3/km^{2} (1,648/sq mi)
- Time zone: UTC+5:30 (IST)

Dayantnagar Mata (Dayāntnagar Mātā), also spelled Dayanatnagar Mata or Dayanatnagar Mota, is a village in Bewar block of Mainpuri district, Uttar Pradesh. As of 2011, it has a population of 1,657, in 271 households.

== Geography ==
Dayantnagar Mata is located by the Kali Nadi stream, which forms the district boundary between Mainpuri and Etah districts. The railway to Farrukhabad crosses the Kali Nadi on a bridge near the village.

== Demographics ==
As of 2011, Dayantnagar Mata had a population of 1,657, in 271 households. This population was 52.9% male (876) and 47.1% female (781). The 0-6 age group numbered 237 (123 male and 114 female), or 14.3% of the total population. 264 residents were members of Scheduled Castes, or 15.9% of the total.

The 1981 census recorded Dayantnagar Mata as having a population of 874 people, in 141 households.

The 1961 census recorded Dayantnagar Mata as comprising 2 hamlets, with a total population of 585 people (326 male and 259 female), in 110 households and 82 physical houses. The area of the village was given as 715 acres; it was then counted as part of Allau block.

== Infrastructure ==
As of 2011, Dayantnagar Mata had 1 primary school; it did not have any healthcare facilities. Drinking water was provided by hand pump; there were no public toilets. The village did not have a post office or public library; there was at least some access to electricity for all purposes. Streets were made of kachcha materials.
