= Bhainsroli =

Village in Uttar Pradesh, India

- Village
- Location in Uttar Pradesh, India
- Coordinates: 27.30072°N 79.24633°E
- Country: India
- State: Uttar Pradesh
- District: Mainpuri
- Tehsil: Bhongaon

Area
  - Total: 7.011 km^{2} (2.707 sq mi)

Population (2011)
  - Total: 5,069
  - Density: 723.0/km^{2} (1,873/sq mi)
- Time zone: UTC+5:30 (IST)

Bhainsroli (Bhainsrolī) is a village in Bewar block of Mainpuri district, Uttar Pradesh, India. As of 2011, it had a population of 5,069, in 856 households.

== Demographics ==
As of 2011, Bhainsroli had a population of 5,069, in 856 households. This population was 54.5% male (2,762) and 45.5% female (2,307). The 0-6 age group numbered 748 (394 male and 354 female), or 14.8% of the total population. 926 residents were members of Scheduled Castes, or 18.3% of the total.

The 1981 census recorded Bhainsroli as having a population of 3,349 people, in 530 households.

The 1961 census recorded Bhainsroli as comprising 6 hamlets, with a total population of 2,002 people (1,094 male and 908 female), in 361 households and 303 physical houses. The area of the village was given as 1,765 acres; it was then counted as part of Allau block.

== Infrastructure ==
As of 2011, Bhainsroli had 3 primary schools; it did not have any healthcare facilities. Drinking water was provided by hand pump; there were no public toilets. The village had a post office but no public library; there was at least some access to electricity for all purposes. Streets were made of both kachcha and pakka materials.
