= Jot, Mainpuri =

Village in Uttar Pradesh, India

Jot
- Village
- Location in Uttar Pradesh, India
- Coordinates: 27.13923°N 79.38474°E
- Country: India
- State: Uttar Pradesh
- District: Mainpuri
- Tehsil: Bhongaon

Area
  - Total: 11.773 km^{2} (4.546 sq mi)

Population (2011)
  - Total: 8,730
  - Density: 742/km^{2} (1,920/sq mi)
- Time zone: UTC+5:30 (IST)
- PIN: 209720

Jot (Joṭ), also romanised as Jote, is a village in Bewar block of Mainpuri district, Uttar Pradesh. Located on the border with Kannauj district, it consists of the main village site along with 12 subsidiary hamlets. As of 2011, Jot has a population of 8,370, in 1,411 households.

== Geography ==
Jot is located on the border with Kannauj district, about 24 km east of Bhongaon and 6 km south of Nabiganj. There is a jhil to the north of the village.

== Demographics ==
As of 2011, Jot had a population of 8,370, in 1,411 households. This population was 50.7% male (4,605) and 49.3% female (4,125). The 0-6 age group numbered 1,435 (780 male and 655 female), or 17.1% of the total population. 2,633 residents were members of Scheduled Castes, or 31.5% of the total.

The 1981 census recorded Jot as having a population of 5,245 people, in 841 households.

The 1961 census recorded Jot as comprising 13 hamlets, with a total population of 3,399 people (1,838 male and 1,561 female), in 595 households and 410 physical houses. The village had a post office at that point.

As of 1901, Jot had a population of 2,069. This was the total population for the mauza, which included 12 subsidiary hamlets along with the main village site.

== Infrastructure ==
As of 2011, Jot had 4 primary schools; it did not have any healthcare facilities. Drinking water was provided by tap, hand pump, and tube well; there were no public toilets. The village had a post office but no public library; there was at least some access to electricity for all purposes. Streets were made of both kachcha and pakka materials.
