= Jasrajpur =

Village in Uttar Pradesh, India

- Village
- Location in Uttar Pradesh, India
- Coordinates: 27.31544°N 79.2497°E
- Country: India
- State: Uttar Pradesh
- District: Mainpuri
- Tehsil: Bhongaon

Area
  - Total: 2.183 km^{2} (0.843 sq mi)

Population (2011)
  - Total: 1,151
  - Density: 527.3/km^{2} (1,366/sq mi)
- Time zone: UTC+5:30 (IST)

Jasrajpur (Jasrājpur) is a village in Bewar block of Mainpuri district, Uttar Pradesh. As of 2011, it had a population of 1,151, in 193 households.

== Demographics ==
As of 2011, Jasrajpur had a population of 1,151, in 193 households. This population was 53.4% male (615) and 46.6% female (536). The 0-6 age group numbered 203 (105 male and 98 female), or 17.6% of the total population. 206 residents were members of Scheduled Castes, or 17.9% of the total.

The 1981 census recorded Jasrajpur as having a population of 488 people, in 85 households.

The 1961 census recorded Jasrajpur as comprising 3 hamlets, with a total population of 430 people (240 male and 190 female), in 70 households and 30 physical houses. The area of the village was given as 546 acres; it was then counted as part of Allau block.

== Infrastructure ==
As of 2011, Jasrajpur had 1 primary school; it did not have any healthcare facilities. Drinking water was provided by hand pump; there were no public toilets. The village had a post office but no public library; there was at least some access to electricity for all purposes. Streets were made of pakka materials.
