= Mahanandpur =

Village in Uttar Pradesh, India

- Village
- Location in Uttar Pradesh, India
- Coordinates: 27.23935°N 79.21244°E
- Country: India
- State: Uttar Pradesh
- District: Mainpuri
- Tehsil: Bhongaon

Area
  - Total: 0.663 km^{2} (0.256 sq mi)

Population (2011)
  - Total: 944
  - Density: 1,420/km^{2} (3,690/sq mi)
- Time zone: UTC+5:30 (IST)

Mahanandpur (Mahānandpur) is a village in Bewar block of Mainpuri district, Uttar Pradesh. As of 2011, it has a population of 944, in 164 households.

== Demographics ==
As of 2011, Mahanandpur had a population of 944, in 164 households. This population was 51.2% male (483) and 48.8% female (461). The 0-6 age group numbered 147 (76 male and 71 female), or 15.6% of the total population. No residents were members of Scheduled Castes.

The 1981 census recorded Mahanandpur as having a population of 545 people, in 106 households.

The 1961 census recorded Mahanandpur as comprising 1 hamlet, with a total population of 710 people (379 male and 331 female), in 63 households and 53 physical houses. The area of the village was given as 169 acres; it was then counted as part of Allau block.

== Infrastructure ==
As of 2011, Mahanandpur had 1 primary school; it did not have any healthcare facilities. Drinking water was provided by hand pump; there were no public toilets. The village had a post office but no public library; there was at least some access to electricity for all purposes. Streets were made of kachcha materials.
