= Bakipur =

Village in Uttar Pradesh, India

- Village
- Location in Uttar Pradesh, India
- Coordinates: 27.26235°N 79.22264°E
- Country: India
- State: Uttar Pradesh
- District: Mainpuri
- Tehsil: Bhongaon

Area
  - Total: 0.931 km^{2} (0.359 sq mi)

Population (2011)
  - Total: 471
  - Density: 506/km^{2} (1,310/sq mi)
- Time zone: UTC+5:30 (IST)

Bakipur (Bākīpur) is a village in Bewar block of Mainpuri district, Uttar Pradesh, India. As of 2011, it had a population of 471, in 78 households.

== Demographics ==
As of 2011, Bakipur had a population of 471, in 78 households. This population was 52.4% male (247) and 47.6% female (224). The 0-6 age group numbered 70 (41 male and 29 female), or 14.9% of the total population. No residents were members of Scheduled Castes.

The 1981 census recorded Bakipur as having a population of 223 people, in 37 households.

The 1961 census recorded Bakipur as comprising 1 hamlet, with a total population of 149 people (84 male and 65 female), in 29 households and 23 physical houses. The area of the village was given as 261 acres; it was then counted as part of Allau block.

== Infrastructure ==
As of 2011, Bakipur did not have any schools or healthcare facilities. Drinking water was provided by hand pump; there were no public toilets. The village had a post office but no public library; there was at least some access to electricity for all purposes. Streets were made of both kachcha and pakka materials.
