= Puranpur, Bewar =

Village in Uttar Pradesh, India

Puranpur
- Village
- Location in Uttar Pradesh, India
- Coordinates: 27.25314°N 79.21977°E
- Country: India
- State: Uttar Pradesh
- District: Mainpuri
- Tehsil: Bhongaon

Area
  - Total: 0.63 km^{2} (0.24 sq mi)

Population (2011)
  - Total: 765
  - Density: 1,200/km^{2} (3,100/sq mi)
- Time zone: UTC+5:30 (IST)

Puranpur (Pūranpur) is a village in Bewar block of Mainpuri district, Uttar Pradesh, India. As of 2011, it had a population of 765, in 116 households.

== Demographics ==
As of 2011, Puranpur had a population of 765, in 116 households. This population was 53.2% male (407) and 46.8% female (358). The 0-6 age group numbered 108 (54 male and 54 female), or 14.1% of the total population. 40 residents were members of Scheduled Castes, or 0.5% of the total.

The 1981 census recorded Puranpur as having a population of 464 people, in 69 households.

The 1961 census recorded Puranpur as comprising 1 hamlet, with a total population of 278 people (149 male and 129 female), in 51 households and 35 physical houses. The area of the village was given as 156 acres; it was then counted as part of Allau block.

== Infrastructure ==
As of 2011, Puranpur had 1 primary school; it did not have any healthcare facilities. Drinking water was provided by hand pump; there were no public toilets. The village had a post office but no public library; there was at least some access to electricity for all purposes. Streets were made of kachcha materials.
