= Kulipur =

Village in Uttar Pradesh, India

- Village
- Location in Uttar Pradesh, India
- Coordinates: 27.26289°N 79.19246°E
- Country: India
- State: Uttar Pradesh
- District: Mainpuri
- Tehsil: Bhongaon

Area
  - Total: 0.745 km^{2} (0.288 sq mi)

Population (2011)
  - Total: 604
  - Density: 811/km^{2} (2,100/sq mi)
- Time zone: UTC+5:30 (IST)

Kulipur (Kulīpur) is a village in Bewar block of Mainpuri district, Uttar Pradesh, India. As of 2011, it had a population of 604, in 100 households.

== Demographics ==
As of 2011, Kulipur had a population of 604, in 100 households. This population was 53.0% male (320) and 47.0% female (284). The 0-6 age group numbered 77 (42 male and 35 female), or 12.7% of the total population. No residents were members of Scheduled Castes.

The 1981 census recorded Kulipur as having a population of 373 people, in 60 households.

The 1961 census recorded Kulipur as comprising 2 hamlets, with a total population of 255 people (136 male and 119 female), in 49 households and 36 physical houses. The area of the village was given as 176 acres; it was then counted as part of Allau block.

== Infrastructure ==
As of 2011, Kulipur had 1 primary school; it did not have any healthcare facilities. Drinking water was provided by hand pump; there were no public toilets. The village had a post office but no public library; there was at least some access to electricity for residential and agricultural (but not commercial) purposes. Streets were made of kachcha materials.
