= Aram Sarai =

Village in Uttar Pradesh, India

- Village
- Location in Uttar Pradesh, India
- Coordinates: 27.24501°N 79.24124°E
- Country: India
- State: Uttar Pradesh
- District: Mainpuri
- Tehsil: Bhongaon

Area
  - Total: 7.687 km^{2} (2.968 sq mi)

Population (2011)
  - Total: 4,830
  - Density: 628/km^{2} (1,630/sq mi)
- Time zone: UTC+5:30 (IST)
- PIN: 205262

Aram Sarai (Āram Sarāy) is a village in Bewar block of Mainpuri district, Uttar Pradesh, India. As of 2011, it had a population of 4,830, in 789 households.

== Demographics ==
As of 2011, Aram Sarai had a population of 4,830, in 789 households. This population was 53.9% male (2,602) and 46.1% female (2,228). The 0-6 age group numbered 761 (398 male and 363 female), or 15.8% of the total population. 837 residents were members of Scheduled Castes, or 17.3% of the total.

The 1981 census recorded Aram Sarai as having a population of 3,175 people, in 488 households.

The 1961 census recorded Aram Sarai as comprising 7 hamlets, with a total population of 2,246 people (1,201 male and 1,045 female), in 412 households and 297 physical houses. The area of the village was given as 1,934 acres; it had a post office and was counted as part of Allau block at that point.

== Infrastructure ==
As of 2011, Aram Sarai had 2 primary schools; it did not have any healthcare facilities. Drinking water was provided by hand pump and tube well/borehole; there were no public toilets. The village had a post office but no public library; there was at least some access to electricity for all purposes. Streets were made of both kachcha and pakka materials.
