= Rakra =

Village in Uttar Pradesh, India

- Village
- Location in Uttar Pradesh, India
- Coordinates: 27.30724°N 79.2153°E
- Country: India
- State: Uttar Pradesh
- District: Mainpuri
- Tehsil: Bhongaon

Area
  - Total: 1.129 km^{2} (0.436 sq mi)

Population (2011)
  - Total: 1,103
  - Density: 977.0/km^{2} (2,530/sq mi)
- Time zone: UTC+5:30 (IST)

Rakra (Rakrā) is a village in Bewar block of Mainpuri district, Uttar Pradesh, India. As of 2011, it had a population of 1,103, in 189 households.

== Demographics ==
As of 2011, Rakra had a population of 1,103, in 189 households. This population was 53.8% male (593) and 46.2% female (510). The 0-6 age group numbered 207 (122 male and 85 female), or 18.8% of the total population. 463 residents were members of Scheduled Castes, or 42.0% of the total.

The 1981 census recorded Rakra as having a population of 825 people, in 153 households.

The 1961 census recorded Rakra (as "Rakara") as comprising 2 hamlets, with a total population of 623 people (330 male and 293 female), in 145 households and 130 physical houses. The area of the village was given as 326 acres; it was then counted as part of Allau block.

== Infrastructure ==
As of 2011, Rakra did not have any schools or healthcare facilities. Drinking water was provided by hand pump and tube well/borehole; there were no public toilets. The village had a post office but no public library; there was at least some access to electricity for residential and commercial (but not agricultural) purposes. Streets were made of kachcha materials.
