= Binodpur =

Village in Uttar Pradesh, India

- Village
- Location in Uttar Pradesh, India
- Coordinates: 27.2688°N 79.21469°E
- Country: India
- State: Uttar Pradesh
- District: Mainpuri
- Tehsil: Bhongaon

Area
  - Total: 1.121 km^{2} (0.433 sq mi)

Population (2011)
  - Total: 1,966
  - Density: 1,754/km^{2} (4,542/sq mi)
- Time zone: UTC+5:30 (IST)

Binodpur (Binodpur), also spelled Vinodpur, is a village in Bewar block of Mainpuri district, Uttar Pradesh, India. As of 2011, it had a population of 1,966, in 348 households.

== Demographics ==
As of 2011, Binodpur had a population of 1,225, in 212 households. This population was 53.7% male (1,056) and 46.3% female (910). The 0-6 age group numbered 301 (173 male and 128 female), or 15.3% of the total population. 485 residents were members of Scheduled Castes, or 24.7% of the total.

The 1981 census recorded Binodpur as having a population of 1,262 people, in 246 households.

The 1961 census recorded Binodpur as comprising 1 hamlet, with a total population of 889 people (463 male and 426 female), in 181 households and 120 physical houses. The area of the village was given as 260 acres; it was then counted as part of Allau block.

== Infrastructure ==
As of 2011, Binodpur had 1 primary school; it did not have any healthcare facilities. Drinking water was provided by hand pump; there were no public toilets. The village did not have a post office or public library; there was at least some access to electricity for all purposes. Streets were made of both kachcha and pakka materials.
