= Bewar, Mainpuri =

Village in Uttar Pradesh, India

Bewar
- Town
- Location in Uttar Pradesh, India
- Coordinates: 27.21869°N 79.29761°E
- Country: India
- State: Uttar Pradesh
- District: Mainpuri
- Tehsil: Bhongaon

Area
  - Total: 9.0 km^{2} (3.5 sq mi)

Population (2011)
  - Total: 23,729
  - Density: 2,600/km^{2} (6,800/sq mi)
- Time zone: UTC+5:30 (IST)

Bewar is a town and nagar panchayat in Bhongaon tehsil of Mainpuri district, Uttar Pradesh. Historically the seat of a pargana and tehsil, it today serves as the seat of a community development block. As of 2011, Bewar had a population of 23,729, in 4,202 households.

== Name ==
Local folk etymology derives the name "Bewar" from the ber plant, hence the local pronunciation "Berwar". According to Paul Whalley, the name is instead derived from the Sanskrit word vyāpāra, which means business, trade, or commerce, and in this case would denote a place where commercial activity takes place.

== Geography ==
Bewar is located about 27 km east of Mainpuri, the district headquarters, at the crossroads with the Etawah-Farrukhabad highway. Bhongaon, the tehsil headquarters, is 13 km away.

== History ==
At the turn of the 20th century, Bewar was both a tehsil and pargana headquarters. It was noted for its "fairly large and important bazar", where numerous shops did business selling cloth, grain, and sweets. Bewar then had a police station, schools for boys and girls, a post office, and a military encampment. The Bewar branch canal had been constructed in 1880, and a telegraph office had been set up at Bewar, both to coordinate water flow at regulators and escapes and also for general public use. At the time, the village of Bewar included 6 hamlets, with a total population of 4,209 people.

== Demographics ==
Historical population
Year	Pop.	±%
1921	2,779	—
1931	3,192	+14.9%
1941	3,466	+8.6%
1951	3,681	+6.2%
1961	(not listed)	—
1971	7,182	—
1981	10,926	+52.1%
1991	15,994	+46.4%
2001	21,058	+31.7%
2011	23,729	+12.7%
Source: 2011 Census of India

As of the 2011 census, Bewar had a population of 23,729, in 4,202 households. This population was 52.5% male (12,456) and 47.5% female (11,273). The 0-6 age group numbered 3,342 (1,782 male and 1,560 female), or 14.1% of the total population. 6,111 residents were members of Scheduled Castes, or 25.8% of the total. The town's literacy rate was 72.3% (counting only people age 7 and up).

== Economy ==
The most important commodities produced in Bewar are sweets, mustard oil, and clay pots. As of 2009, Karhal had 2 nationalised banks, 0 private commercial banks, 2 cooperative banks, and 2 agricultural credit societies.

== Infrastructure ==
As of 2011, Bewar has 1 hospital with 30 beds, 41 medicine shops, 23 schools teaching at the primary level, and 9 schools teaching at the secondary level, as well as a public library. Drinking water is provided by tap, from a treated source. Water is stored in overhead tank(s), with a total capacity of 1,400 kilolitres. The town has a local fire department.

== List of villages under Bewar block ==
The following 157 villages are counted as part of Bewar CD block:

1. Ahimalpur
2. Ahinkaripur
3. Ahmadpur Karuamai
4. Akbarpur Biku
5. Akbarpur Ganu
6. Amhira
7. Apoor Pur
8. Aram Sarai
9. Athalakra
10. Baghpur
11. Bahdinpur
12. Bahramau
13. Bajhera
14. Bajpur
15. Bakipur
16. Banakia
17. Bankahar
18. Bara
19. Barauli
20. Beerpur Khas
21. Bewar Grameem
22. Bhainsroli
23. Bhawalpur
24. Bhilampur
25. Bhur Bakain
26. Bhur Haar
27. Bhur Patia
28. Bikkapur
29. Bilpur Hussainpur
30. Bilsara
31. Binodpur
32. Biraimpur Satdhara
33. Chandanpur
34. Chandanpura
35. Chanepur
36. Chaumajhee
37. Chhabilepur
38. Chhinkaura Garhia
39. Chilaunsa
40. Chirawar
41. Daleeppur Naraini
42. Danpatti
43. Daudpur
44. Dayant Nagar Mata
45. Deoraniyan
46. Dharmangadpur
47. Dhumaspur
48. Dikhatmai
49. Durjanpur
50. Fatehpur Gani
51. Gadda Haar
52. Gagarwala
53. Gazianpur
54. Gaziyanpur
55. Gobarharpur
56. Gokhar
57. Gulalpur
58. Hadua
59. Hajipur Baran
60. Harzapur
61. Hasra
62. Himayunpur
63. Hindupur
64. Hradayarampur
65. Hussainpur
66. Isapur Khas
67. Jagatpur Dikhat Mai
68. Jagatpur Khas
69. Jakha
70. Jalalpur
71. Jalalpur Dikhatmai
72. Jamaura
73. Janaura
74. Jasarajpur
75. Jasmai
76. Jaswantnagar
77. Jhandepur
78. Jilhi
79. Joga
80. Jote
81. Kamalpur Mahmoddia
82. Karaujihar
83. Karpiya
84. Kaua Tanda
85. Kausepur
86. Kulipur
87. Kundhi
88. Kushalpur
89. Lodhipur
90. Maddapur Khas
91. Maddapur Khurd
92. Madhonagar
93. Madhukarpur
94. Madhupuri
95. Mahadiya
96. Mahanandpur
97. Maheshpur
98. Mallai Hussainpur
99. Mallamai
100. Mallunagar
101. Manjhola
102. Manpur Biku
103. Manpur Hari
104. Meerpur Chhadami
105. Mirjapur
106. Mohabbatpur Bhatwara
107. Muddapur Bhogi
108. Mundai
109. Musepur
110. Nabiganj
111. Nagla Baal
112. Nagla Devi
113. Nagla Murar
114. Nagla Pandey
115. Nagla Penth
116. Nagla Sudama
117. Nagthari
118. Naika Mau
119. Nandulia
120. Naseerpur
121. Naurangabad
122. Nijampur
123. Noonari
124. Padamner
125. Palaudhi
126. Paraunkha
127. Patna Tilua
128. Piyapur
129. Pooranpur
130. Pratappur
131. Prempur
132. Puraia
133. Rahuthara
134. Raipur
135. Rakra
136. Ramnagar
137. Ramnagar
138. Rampur
139. Rampura
140. Saidpur
141. Sakat Bewar
142. Sarai Mandu
143. Saraichak Govindpur
144. Shahjahanpur
145. Sherpur Chuharpur
146. Shivsinghpur
147. Shyampur Bhatpura
148. Sultanpur Nevada
149. Syona
150. Takharau Jiwanpur
151. Tal Suhela
152. Tarwa Dewa
153. Tigwan
154. Tikuri
155. Tiliyani
156. Todarpur
157. Umarpur
