= Barauli, Bewar =

Village in Uttar Pradesh, India

Barauli
- Village
- Location in Uttar Pradesh, India
- Coordinates: 27.28209°N 79.22589°E
- Country: India
- State: Uttar Pradesh
- District: Mainpuri
- Tehsil: Bhongaon

Area
  - Total: 2.56 km^{2} (0.99 sq mi)

Population (2011)
  - Total: 2,328
  - Density: 909/km^{2} (2,360/sq mi)
- Time zone: UTC+5:30 (IST)

Barauli (Baraulī) is a village in Bewar block of Mainpuri district, Uttar Pradesh, India. As of 2011, it had a population of 2,328, in 387 households.

== Demographics ==
As of 2011, Barauli had a population of 2,328, in 387 households. This population was 54.3% male (1,263) and 45.7% female (1,065). The 0-6 age group numbered 344 (184 male and 160 female), or 14.8% of the total population. 565 residents were members of Scheduled Castes, or 24.3% of the total.

The 1981 census recorded Barauli as having a population of 1,698 people, in 282 households.

The 1961 census recorded Barauli as comprising 5 hamlets, with a total population of 1,148 people (601 male and 547 female), in 217 households and 149 physical houses. The area of the village was given as 645 acres; it was then counted as part of Allau block.

== Infrastructure ==
As of 2011, Barauli had 2 primary schools; it did not have any healthcare facilities. Drinking water was provided by hand pump and tube well/borehole; there were no public toilets. The village had a post office and public library, as well as at least some access to electricity for all purposes. Streets were made of both kachcha and pakka materials.
