= Hansra =

Village in Uttar Pradesh, India

- Village
- Location in Uttar Pradesh, India
- Coordinates: 27.31523°N 79.23529°E
- Country: India
- State: Uttar Pradesh
- District: Mainpuri
- Tehsil: Bhongaon

Area
  - Total: 0.802 km^{2} (0.310 sq mi)

Population (2011)
  - Total: 254
  - Density: 317/km^{2} (820/sq mi)
- Time zone: UTC+5:30 (IST)

Hansra (Hansrā), also spelled Hasra, is a village in Bewar block of Mainpuri district, Uttar Pradesh, India. As of 2011, it had a population of 254, in 37 households.

== Demographics ==
As of 2011, Hansra had a population of 254, in 37 households. This population was 52.4% male (133) and 47.6% female (121). The 0-6 age group numbered 38 (19 male and 19 female), or 15.0% of the total population. No residents were members of Scheduled Castes.

The 1981 census recorded Hansra (as "Hansara") as having a population of 122 people, in 19 households.

The 1961 census recorded Hansra as comprising 1 hamlet, with a total population of 104 people (55 male and 49 female), in 21 households and 17 physical houses. The area of the village was given as 222 acres; it was then counted as part of Allau block.

== Infrastructure ==
As of 2011, Hansra did not have any schools or healthcare facilities. Drinking water was provided by hand pump and tube well/borehole; there were no public toilets. The village had a post office but no public library; there was at least some access to electricity for all purposes. Streets were made of both kachcha and pakka materials.
