= Kuchela, Mainpuri =

Village in Uttar Pradesh, India

Kuchela
- Village
- Location in Uttar Pradesh, India
- Coordinates: 27.15095°N 78.93583°E
- Country: India
- State: Uttar Pradesh
- District: Mainpuri
- Tehsil: Mainpuri

Area
  - Total: 13.828 km^{2} (5.339 sq mi)

Population (2011)
  - Total: 7,051
  - Density: 509.9/km^{2} (1,321/sq mi)
- Time zone: UTC+5:30 (IST)

Kuchela (Kuchelā) is a village in Mainpuri block of Mainpuri district, Uttar Pradesh. As of 2011, it has a population of 7,051, in 1,102 households.

== Geography ==
Kuchela is located about 8 km south of Mainpuri. It is between the villages of Gangsi and Dharmangadpur Nagariya, and a rural road used to connect the three places.

== Demographics ==
As of 2011, Kuchela had a population of 7,051, in 1,102 households. This population was 53.6% male (3,777) and 46.4% female (3,274). The 0-6 age group numbered 1,066 (576 male and 490 female), or 15.1% of the total population. 1,747 residents were members of Scheduled Castes, or 24.8% of the total.

The 1981 census recorded Kuchela as having a population of 4,186 people, in 704 households.

The 1961 census recorded Kuchela as comprising 17 hamlets, with a total population of 2,960 people (1,618 male and 1,342 female), in 535 households and 431 physical houses. The area of the village was given as 3,341 acres and it had a post office and dispensary at that point.

As of 1901, Kuchela comprised 7 hamlets, had a population of 2,187, and had a small bazar and a school teaching in the Hindustani language.

== Infrastructure ==
As of 2011, Kuchela had 5 primary schools and 1 community health centre. Drinking water was provided by tap, hand pump, and tube well; there were no public toilets. The village had a post office but no public library; there was at least some access to electricity for all purposes. Streets were made of both kachcha and pakka materials.
