= Jaswantnagar, Mainpuri =

Village in Uttar Pradesh, India

Jaswantnagar
- Village
- Location in Uttar Pradesh, India
- Coordinates: 27.2908°N 79.21315°E
- Country: India
- State: Uttar Pradesh
- District: Mainpuri
- Tehsil: Bhongaon

Area
  - Total: 0.789 km^{2} (0.305 sq mi)

Population (2011)
  - Total: 436
  - Density: 553/km^{2} (1,430/sq mi)
- Time zone: UTC+5:30 (IST)

Jaswantnagar is a village in Bewar block of Mainpuri district, Uttar Pradesh, India. As of 2011, it had a population of 436, in 84 households.

== Demographics ==
As of 2011, Jaswantnagar had a population of 436, in 84 households. This population was 54.4% male (237) and 45.6% female (199). The 0-6 age group numbered 44 (20 male and 24 female), or 10.1% of the total population. 86 residents were members of Scheduled Castes, or 19.7% of the total.

The 1981 census recorded Jaswantnagar as having a population of 328 people, in 69 households.

The 1961 census recorded Jaswantnagar as comprising 1 hamlet, with a total population of 239 people (128 male and 111 female), in 43 households and 35 physical houses. The area of the village was given as 193 acres; it was then counted as part of Allau block.

== Infrastructure ==
As of 2011, Jaswantnagar did not have any schools or healthcare facilities. Drinking water was provided by hand pump; there were no public toilets. The village had a post office but no public library; there was at least some access to electricity for all purposes. Streets were made of pakka materials.
