= Sultanpur Nawada =

Village in Uttar Pradesh, India

- Village
- Location in Uttar Pradesh, India
- Coordinates: 27.25384°N 79.31482°E
- Country: India
- State: Uttar Pradesh
- District: Mainpuri
- Tehsil: Bhongaon

Area
  - Total: 1.038 km^{2} (0.401 sq mi)

Population (2011)
  - Total: 1,134
  - Density: 1,092/km^{2} (2,830/sq mi)
- Time zone: UTC+5:30 (IST)

Sultanpur Nawada (Sultānpur Nawādā) is a village in Bewar block of Mainpuri district, Uttar Pradesh. As of 2011, it has a population of 1,134, in 192 households.

== Demographics ==
As of 2011, Sultanpur Nawada had a population of 1,134, in 192 households. This population was 53.7% male (609) and 46.3% female (525). The 0-6 age group numbered 161 (82 male and 79 female), or 14.2% of the total population. 209 residents were members of Scheduled Castes, or 18.4% of the total.

The 1981 census recorded Sultanpur Nawada (as "Sultanpur Newada") as having a population of 607 people, in 100 households.

The 1961 census recorded Sultanpur Nawada as comprising 2 hamlets, with a total population of 439 people (254 male and 185 female), in 85 households and 63 physical houses. The area of the village was given as 327 acres.

== Infrastructure ==
As of 2011, Sultanpur Nawada had 2 primary schools; it did not have any healthcare facilities. Drinking water was provided by hand pump and tube well/borehole; there were no public toilets. The village had a post office but no public library; there was at least some access to electricity for all purposes. Streets were made of kachcha materials.
