= Nagla Penth =

Village in Uttar Pradesh, India

- Village
- Location in Uttar Pradesh, India
- Coordinates: 27.26413°N 79.29081°E
- Country: India
- State: Uttar Pradesh
- District: Mainpuri
- Tehsil: Bhongaon

Area
  - Total: 1.601 km^{2} (0.618 sq mi)

Population (2011)
  - Total: 1,505
  - Density: 940.0/km^{2} (2,435/sq mi)
- Time zone: UTC+5:30 (IST)

Nagla Penth (Naglā Peṇṭh) is a village in Bewar block of Mainpuri district, Uttar Pradesh. There is a prominent jhil on village lands. As of 2011, it had a population of 1,505, in 239 households.

== Geography ==
There is a prominent jhil at Nagla Penth.

== Demographics ==
As of 2011, Nagla Penth had a population of 1,505, in 239 households. This population was 52.2% male (786) and 47.8% female (719). The 0-6 age group numbered 198 (91 male and 107 female), or 13.2% of the total population. 511 residents were members of Scheduled Castes, or 34.0% of the total.

The 1981 census recorded Nagla Penth (as "Nagla Painth") as having a population of 920 people, in 62 households.

The 1961 census recorded Nagla Penth as comprising 1 hamlet, with a total population of 599 people (315 male and 284 female), in 120 households and 79 physical houses. The area of the village was given as 398 acres.

== Infrastructure ==
As of 2011, Nagla Penth had 2 primary schools and 1 maternity and child welfare centre. Drinking water was provided by hand pump; there were no public toilets. The village had a sub post office but no public library; there was at least some access to electricity for all purposes. Streets were made of both kachcha and pakka materials.
