= Ahinkaripur =

Village in Uttar Pradesh, India

- Village
- Location in Uttar Pradesh, India
- Coordinates: 27.13745°N 79.28029°E
- Country: India
- State: Uttar Pradesh
- District: Mainpuri
- Tehsil: Bhongaon

Area
  - Total: 0.993 km^{2} (0.383 sq mi)

Population (2011)
  - Total: 1,170
  - Density: 1,180/km^{2} (3,050/sq mi)
- Time zone: UTC+5:30 (IST)

Ahinkaripur (Ahinkārīpur) is a village in Bewar block of Mainpuri district, Uttar Pradesh, India. As of 2011, it had a population of 1,170, in 190 households.

== Demographics ==
As of 2011, Ahinkaripur had a population of 1,170, in 190 households. This population was 53.2% male (622) and 46.8% female (548). The 0-6 age group numbered 186 (92 male and 94 female), or 15.9% of the total population. 135 residents were members of Scheduled Castes, or 11.5% of the total.

The 1981 census recorded Ahinkaripur as having a population of 626 people, in 85 households.

The 1961 census recorded Ahinkaripur as comprising 1 hamlet, with a total population of 375 people (208 male and 167 female), in 70 households and 61 physical houses. The area of the village was given as 244 acres.

== Infrastructure ==
As of 2011, Ahinkaripur had 1 primary school; it did not have any healthcare facilities. Drinking water was provided by tap, hand pump, and tube well/borehole; there were no public toilets. The village had a post office and public library, as well as at least some access to electricity for all purposes. Streets were made of both kachcha and pakka materials.
