= Nagla Sudama =

Village in Uttar Pradesh, India

- Village
- Location in Uttar Pradesh, India
- Coordinates: 27.18546°N 79.37148°E
- Country: India
- State: Uttar Pradesh
- District: Mainpuri
- Tehsil: Bhongaon

Area
  - Total: 1.132 km^{2} (0.437 sq mi)

Population (2011)
  - Total: 1,936
  - Density: 1,710/km^{2} (4,430/sq mi)
- Time zone: UTC+5:30 (IST)

Nagla Sudama (Naglā Sudāmā) is a village in Bewar block of Mainpuri district, Uttar Pradesh. As of 2011, it has a population of 1,936, in 291 households.

== Demographics ==
As of 2011, Nagla Sudama had a population of 1,936, in 291 households. This population was 52.6% male (1,018) and 47.4% female (918). The 0-6 age group numbered 312 (151 male and 161 female), or 16.1% of the total population. 446 residents were members of Scheduled Castes, or 23.0% of the total.

The 1981 census recorded Nagla Sudama as having a population of 1,102 people, in 181 households.

The 1961 census recorded Nagla Sudama (as "Nagla Sudaman") as comprising 5 hamlets, with a total population of 747 people (400 male and 347 female), in 140 households and 102 physical houses. The area of the village was given as 287 acres.

== Infrastructure ==
As of 2011, Nagla Sudama had 1 primary school; it did not have any healthcare facilities. Drinking water was provided by hand pump; there were no public toilets. The village had a post office but no public library; there was at least some access to electricity for all purposes. Streets were made of both kachcha and pakka materials.
