= Manjhola =

Village in Uttar Pradesh, India

- Village
- Location in Uttar Pradesh, India
- Coordinates: 27.20448°N 79.29575°E
- Country: India
- State: Uttar Pradesh
- District: Mainpuri
- Tehsil: Bhongaon

Area
  - Total: 0.424 km^{2} (0.164 sq mi)

Population (2011)
  - Total: 479
  - Density: 1,130/km^{2} (2,930/sq mi)
- Time zone: UTC+5:30 (IST)

Manjhola (Mañjholā) is a village in Bewar block of Mainpuri district, Uttar Pradesh. As of 2011, it has a population of 479, in 97 households.

== Demographics ==
As of 2011, Manjhola had a population of 479, in 97 households. This population was 56.2% male (269) and 43.8% female (210). The 0-6 age group numbered 78 (47 male and 31 female), or 16.3% of the total population. 8 residents were members of Scheduled Castes, or 1.7% of the total.

The 1981 census recorded Manjhola as having a population of 465 people, in 72 households.

The 1961 census recorded Manjhola as comprising 1 hamlet, with a total population of 267 people (142 male and 125 female), in 60 households and 42 physical houses. The area of the village was given as 138 acres.

== Infrastructure ==
As of 2011, Manjhola had 2 primary schools; it did not have any healthcare facilities. Drinking water was provided by hand pump and tube well/borehole; there were no public toilets. The village had a post office but no public library; there was at least some access to electricity for all purposes. Streets were made of both kachcha and pakka materials.
