= Bara, Mainpuri =

Village in Uttar Pradesh, India

Bara
- Village
- Location in Uttar Pradesh, India
- Coordinates: 27.15018°N 79.29934°E
- Country: India
- State: Uttar Pradesh
- District: Mainpuri
- Tehsil: Bhongaon

Area
  - Total: 3.093 km^{2} (1.194 sq mi)

Population (2011)
  - Total: 1,941
  - Density: 627.5/km^{2} (1,625/sq mi)
- Time zone: UTC+5:30 (IST)

Bara is a village in the Bewar block of Mainpuri district, Uttar Pradesh.

== Demographics ==
As of 2011, Bara had a population of 1,941 in 313 households. This population was 53.6% male (1,041) and 46.4% female (900). The 0-6 age group numbered 276 (138 male and 138 female), or 14.2% of the total population. 509 residents were members of Scheduled Castes, or 26.2% of the total.

The 1981 census recorded Bara as having a population of 1,370 people, in 276 households.

The 1961 census recorded Bara as comprising 2 hamlets, with a total population of 989 people (524 male and 465 female), in 198 households and 139 physical houses. The area of the village was given as 775 acres.

== Infrastructure ==
As of 2011, Bara had 1 primary school; it did not have any healthcare facilities. Drinking water was provided by tap, well, hand pump, and tube well/borehole; there were no public toilets. The village had a public library but no post office; there was at least some access to electricity for residential and agricultural (but not commercial) purposes. Streets were made of both kachcha and pakka materials.
