= Ahmadpur Karuamai =

Village in Uttar Pradesh, India

- Village
- Location in Uttar Pradesh, India
- Coordinates: 27.2504494°N 79.2916301°E
- Country: India
- State: Uttar Pradesh
- District: Mainpuri
- Tehsil: Bhongaon

Area
  - Total: 0.95 km^{2} (0.37 sq mi)

Population (2011)
  - Total: 934
  - Density: 980/km^{2} (2,500/sq mi)
- Time zone: UTC+5:30 (IST)

Ahmadpur Karuamai (Ahmadpur Karuāmaī) is a village in Bewar block of Mainpuri district, Uttar Pradesh, India. As of 2011, it had a population of 934, in 152 households.

== Demographics ==
As of 2011, Ahmadpur Karuamai had a population of 934, in 152 households. This population was 54.5% male (509) and 45.5% female (425). The 0-6 age group numbered 108 (64 male and 44 female), or 11.6% of the total population. No residents were members of Scheduled Castes.

The 1981 census recorded Ahmadpur Karuamai as having a population of 568 people, in 91 households.

The 1961 census recorded Ahmadpur Karuamai (as "Ahamadpur Karuamai") as comprising 3 hamlets, with a total population of 350 people (188 male and 162 female), in 61 households and 45 physical houses. The area of the village was given as 268 acres.

== Infrastructure ==
As of 2011, Ahmadpur Karuamai had 1 primary school; it did not have any healthcare facilities. Drinking water was provided by hand pump and tube well/borehole; there were no public toilets. The village had a post office but no public library; there was at least some access to electricity for all purposes. Streets were made of and pakka materials.
