= Bahramau =

Village in Uttar Pradesh, India

- Village
- Location in Uttar Pradesh, India
- Coordinates: 27.12066°N 79.32979°E
- Country: India
- State: Uttar Pradesh
- District: Mainpuri
- Tehsil: Bhongaon

Area
  - Total: 1.435 km^{2} (0.554 sq mi)

Population (2011)
  - Total: 1,371
  - Density: 955.4/km^{2} (2,474/sq mi)
- Time zone: UTC+5:30 (IST)

Bahramau (Bahrāmaū) is a village in Bewar block of Mainpuri district, Uttar Pradesh. As of 2011, it has a population of 1,371, in 206 households.

== Demographics ==
As of 2011, Bahramau had a population of 1,371, in 206 households. This population was 54.4% male (746) and 45.6% female (625). The 0-6 age group numbered 188 (104 male and 84 female), or 13.7% of the total population. 236 residents were members of Scheduled Castes, or 17.2% of the total.

The 1981 census recorded Bahramau (as "Baharamau") as having a population of 1,013 people, in 151 households.

The 1961 census recorded Bahramau as comprising 2 hamlets, with a total population of 667 people (359 male and 308 female), in 122 households and 90 physical houses. The area of the village was given as 360 acres.

== Infrastructure ==
As of 2011, Bahramau had 1 primary school; it did not have any healthcare facilities. Drinking water was provided by hand pump and tube well/borehole; there were no public toilets. The village had a post office but no public library; there was at least some access to electricity for all purposes. Streets were made of both kachcha and pakka materials.

Bahramau is located by the Bewar branch canal, and there is a canal fall on the canal at Bahramau.
