= Mundai, Mainpuri =

Village in Uttar Pradesh, India

Mundai
- Village
- Location in Uttar Pradesh, India
- Coordinates: 27.14729°N 79.34462°E
- Country: India
- State: Uttar Pradesh
- District: Mainpuri
- Tehsil: Bhongaon

Area
  - Total: 5.793 km^{2} (2.237 sq mi)

Population (2011)
  - Total: 4,445
  - Density: 767.3/km^{2} (1,987/sq mi)
- Time zone: UTC+5:30 (IST)

Mundai (Muḍaī) is a village in Bewar block of Mainpuri district, Uttar Pradesh. As of 2011, it had a population of 4,445, in 723 households.

== Demographics ==
As of 2011, Mudai had a population of 4,445, in 723 households. This population was 53.4% male (2,373) and 46.6% female (2,072). The 0-6 age group numbered 602 (297 male and 305 female), or 13.5% of the total population. 520 residents were members of Scheduled Castes, or 11.7% of the total.

The 1981 census recorded Mudai as having a population of 2,727 people, in 431 households.

The 1961 census recorded Mudai as comprising 5 hamlets, with a total population of 2,023 people (1,081 male and 942 female), in 390 households and 263 physical houses. The area of the village was given as 1,433 acres.

== Infrastructure ==
As of 2011, Mundai had 3 primary schools and 1 maternity and child welfare centre. Drinking water was provided by tap, hand pump, and tube well/borehole; there were no public toilets. The village had a post office but no public library; there was at least some access to electricity for all purposes. Streets were made of both kachcha and pakka materials.
