= Nagla Pandey =

Village in Uttar Pradesh, India

- Village
- Location in Uttar Pradesh, India
- Coordinates: 27.10616°N 79.34186°E
- Country: India
- State: Uttar Pradesh
- District: Mainpuri
- Tehsil: Bhongaon

Area
  - Total: 1.06 km^{2} (0.41 sq mi)

Population (2011)
  - Total: 1,149
  - Density: 1,080/km^{2} (2,810/sq mi)
- Time zone: UTC+5:30 (IST)
- PIN: 209720

Nagla Pandey (Naglā Pāṇḍey), or Naglā Pāṇḍe), is a village in Bewar block of Mainpuri district, Uttar Pradesh. As of 2011, it had a population of 1,149, in 175 households.

== Demographics ==
As of 2011, Nagla Pandey had a population of 1,149, in 175 households. This population was 52.5% male (603) and 47.5% female (546). The 0-6 age group numbered 221 (112 male and 109 female), or 19.2% of the total population. 186 residents were members of Scheduled Castes, or 16.2% of the total.

The 1981 census recorded Nagla Pandey (spelled "Nagla Panday") as having a population of 621 people, in 106 households.

The 1961 census recorded Nagla Pandey (spelled "Nagla Pande") as comprising 1 hamlet, with a total population of 443 people (244 male and 199 female), in 81 households and 54 physical houses. The area of the village was given as 261 acres.

== Infrastructure ==
As of 2011, Nagla Pandey had 1 primary school; for healthcare facilities, it had 1 family welfare centre. Drinking water was provided by hand pump and tube well/borehole; there were no public toilets. The village had a post office but no public library; there was at least some access to electricity for all purposes. Streets were made of both kachcha and pakka materials.
