= Shyampur Bhatpura =

Village in Uttar Pradesh, India

- Village
- Location in Uttar Pradesh, India
- Coordinates: 27.1659717°N 79.3698354°E
- Country: India
- State: Uttar Pradesh
- District: Mainpuri
- Tehsil: Bhongaon

Area
  - Total: 2.312 km^{2} (0.893 sq mi)

Population (2011)
  - Total: 2,293
  - Density: 991.8/km^{2} (2,569/sq mi)
- Time zone: UTC+5:30 (IST)

Shyampur Bhatpura (Śyāmpur Bhaṭpurā) is a village in Bewar block of Mainpuri district, Uttar Pradesh, India. As of 2011, it had a population of 2,293, in 327 households.

== Demographics ==
As of 2011, Shyampur Bhatpura had a population of 2,293, in 327 households. This population was 52.4% male (1,202) and 47.6% female (1,091). The 0-6 age group numbered 367 (180 male and 187 female), or 16.0% of the total population. 474 residents were members of Scheduled Castes, or 20.7% of the total.

The 1981 census recorded Shyampur Bhatpura as having a population of 1,361 people, in 215 households.

The 1961 census recorded Shyampur Bhatpura as comprising 5 hamlets, with a total population of 864 people (463 male and 401 female), in 158 households and 105 physical houses. The area of the village was given as 574 acres.

== Infrastructure ==
As of 2011, Shyampur Bhatpura had 2 primary schools; it did not have any healthcare facilities. Drinking water was provided by hand pump; there were no public toilets. The village had a post office but no public library; there was at least some access to electricity for all purposes. Streets were made of both kachcha and pakka materials.
