= Chilaunsa =

Village in Uttar Pradesh, India

- Village
- Location in Uttar Pradesh, India
- Coordinates: 27.17746°N 79.28184°E
- Country: India
- State: Uttar Pradesh
- District: Mainpuri
- Tehsil: Bhongaon

Area
  - Total: 4.081 km^{2} (1.576 sq mi)

Population (2011)
  - Total: 2,147
  - Density: 526.1/km^{2} (1,363/sq mi)
- Time zone: UTC+5:30 (IST)

Chilaunsa (Chilaunsā) is a village in Bewar block of Mainpuri district, Uttar Pradesh. As of 2011, it has a population of 2,147, in 351 households.

== Demographics ==
As of 2011, Chilaunsa had a population of 2,147, in 351 households. This population was 53.4% male (1,147) and 46.6% female (1,000). The 0-6 age group numbered 288 (153 male and 135 female), or 13.4% of the total population. 299 residents were members of Scheduled Castes, or 13.9% of the total.

The 1981 census recorded Chilaunsa (as "Chilausa") as having a population of 1,542 people, in 269 households.

The 1961 census recorded Chilaunsa as comprising 5 hamlets, with a total population of 1,021 people (573 male and 448 female), in 182 households and 124 physical houses. The area of the village was given as 1,020 acres.

== Infrastructure ==
As of 2011, Chilaunsa had 1 primary school and 1 primary health centre. Drinking water was provided by hand pump; there were no public toilets. The village had a post office but no public library; there was at least some access to electricity for all purposes. Streets were made of both kachcha and pakka materials.
