= Nagla Devi, Bewar =

Village in Uttar Pradesh, India

Nagla Devi
- Village
- Location in Uttar Pradesh, India
- Coordinates: 27.20676°N 79.2694°E
- Country: India
- State: Uttar Pradesh
- District: Mainpuri
- Tehsil: Bhongaon

Area
  - Total: 1.353 km^{2} (0.522 sq mi)

Population (2011)
  - Total: 1,017
  - Density: 751.7/km^{2} (1,947/sq mi)
- Time zone: UTC+5:30 (IST)

Nagla Devi (Naglā Devī) is a village in Bewar block of Mainpuri district, Uttar Pradesh, India. As of 2011, it had a population of 1,017, in 173 households.

== Demographics ==
As of 2011, Nagla Devi had a population of 1,017, in 173 households. This population was 51.9% male (528) and 48.1% female (489). The 0-6 age group numbered 132 (66 male and 66 female), or 13.0% of the total population. 256 residents were members of Scheduled Castes, or 25.2% of the total.

The 1981 census recorded Nagla Devi (as "Nagaladevi") as having a population of 705 people, in 106 households.

The 1961 census recorded Nagla Devi as comprising 1 hamlet, with a total population of 443 people (244 male and 199 female), in 76 households and 54 physical houses. The area of the village was given as 330 acres.

== Infrastructure ==
As of 2011, Nagla Devi had 1 primary school; it did not have any healthcare facilities. Drinking water was provided by hand pump; there were no public toilets. The village had a post office but no public library; there was at least some access to electricity for all purposes. Streets were made of both kachcha and pakka materials.
