= Jilhi =

Village in Uttar Pradesh, India

- Village
- Location in Uttar Pradesh, India
- Coordinates: 27.26891°N 79.28201°E
- Country: India
- State: Uttar Pradesh
- District: Mainpuri
- Tehsil: Bhongaon

Area
  - Total: 1.485 km^{2} (0.573 sq mi)

Population (2011)
  - Total: 1,866
  - Density: 1,257/km^{2} (3,254/sq mi)
- Time zone: UTC+5:30 (IST)

Jilhi (Jilhī) is a village in Bewar block of Mainpuri district, Uttar Pradesh. As of 2011, it has a population of 1,866, in 305 households.

== Demographics ==
As of 2011, Jilhi had a population of 1,866, in 305 households. This population was 54.6% male (1,019) and 45.4% female (847). The 0-6 age group numbered 225 (115 male and 110 female), or 12.1% of the total population. 10 residents were members of Scheduled Castes, or 0.5% of the total.

The 1981 census recorded Jilhi as having a population of 841 people, in 150 households.

The 1961 census recorded Jilhi as comprising 4 hamlets, with a total population of 566 people (300 male and 266 female), in 104 households and 69 physical houses. The area of the village was given as 369 acres.

== Infrastructure ==
As of 2011, Jilhi had 1 primary school; it did not have any healthcare facilities. Drinking water was provided by hand pump; there were no public toilets. The village did not have a post office or public library; there was at least some access to electricity for all purposes. Streets were made of both kachcha and pakka materials.
