= Sakat Bewar =

Village in Uttar Pradesh, India

- Village
- Location in Uttar Pradesh, India
- Coordinates: 27.22355°N 79.32292°E
- Country: India
- State: Uttar Pradesh
- District: Mainpuri
- Tehsil: Bhongaon

Area
  - Total: 5.205 km^{2} (2.010 sq mi)

Population (2011)
  - Total: 3,736
  - Density: 717.8/km^{2} (1,859/sq mi)
- Time zone: UTC+5:30 (IST)

Sakat Bewar is a village in Bewar block of Mainpuri district, Uttar Pradesh. As of 2011, it had a population of 3,736, in 636 households.

== Geography ==
Sakat Bewar is located close to the Kali Nadi stream, which forms the district boundary between Mainpuri and Etah districts. The road to Farrukhabad crosses the Kali Nadi on a bridge near Sakat Bewar. A drain from the Bewar branch canal also empties into the river near Sakat Bewar. The bridge was destroyed by flooding in 1885, but later rebuilt.

== Demographics ==
As of 2011, Sakat Bewar had a population of 3,736, in 636 households. This population was 53.9 male (2,015) and 46.1% female (1,721). The 0-6 age group numbered 548 (288 male and 260 female), or 14.7% of the total population. 733 residents were members of Scheduled Castes, or 19.6% of the total.

The 1981 census recorded Sakat Bewar as having a population of 2,090 people, in 317 households.

The 1961 census recorded Sakat Bewar as comprising 5 hamlets, with a total population of 1,362 people (735 male and 627 female), in 246 households and 132 physical houses. The area of the village was given as 1,295 acres.

== Infrastructure ==
As of 2011, Sakat Bewar had 1 primary school; it did not have any healthcare facilities. Drinking water was provided by hand pump and tube well/borehole; there were no public toilets. The village had a post office but no public library; there was at least some access to electricity for all purposes. Streets were made of both kachcha and pakka materials.
