= Nekamau =

Village in Uttar Pradesh, India

- Village
- Location in Uttar Pradesh, India
- Coordinates: 27.19849°N 79.34075°E
- Country: India
- State: Uttar Pradesh
- District: Mainpuri
- Tehsil: Bhongaon

Area
  - Total: 1.33 km^{2} (0.51 sq mi)

Population (2011)
  - Total: 789
  - Density: 593/km^{2} (1,540/sq mi)
- Time zone: UTC+5:30 (IST)

Nekamau (Nekāmaū or Naikā Maū), is a village in Bewar block of Mainpuri district, Uttar Pradesh, India. As of 2011, it had a population of 789, in 146 households.

== Demographics ==
As of 2011, Nekamau had a population of 789, in 146 households. This population was 53.4% male (421) and 46.6% female (368). The 0-6 age group numbered 111 (59 male and 52 female), or 14.1% of the total population. 122 residents were members of Scheduled Castes, or 15.5% of the total.

The 1981 census recorded Nekamau as having a population of 543 people, in 101 households.

The 1961 census recorded Nekamau as comprising 3 hamlets, with a total population of 338 people (191 male and 147 female), in 63 households and 35 physical houses. The area of the village was given as 331 acres.

== Infrastructure ==
As of 2011, Nekamau did not have any schools or healthcare facilities. Drinking water was provided by hand pump and tube well/borehole; there were no public toilets. The village had a post office but no public library; there was at least some access to electricity for all purposes. Streets were made of both kachcha and pakka materials.
