= Baghpur =

Village in Uttar Pradesh, India

- Village
- Location in Uttar Pradesh, India
- Coordinates: 27.25783°N 79.25156°E
- Country: India
- State: Uttar Pradesh
- District: Mainpuri
- Tehsil: Bhongaon

Area
  - Total: 1.10 km^{2} (0.42 sq mi)

Population (2011)
  - Total: 1,450
  - Density: 1,320/km^{2} (3,410/sq mi)
- Time zone: UTC+5:30 (IST)

Baghpur (Bāghpur) is a village in Bewar block of Mainpuri district, Uttar Pradesh. As of the 2011 census, the population was 1,450, residing in 224 households.

== Demographics ==
In 2011 census, Baghpur had a population of 1,450, in 224 households. This population was 57.0% male (768) and 47.0% female (682). The 0-6 age group numbered 250 (137 male and 113 female), or 17.2% of the total population. 313 residents were members of Scheduled Castes, or 21.6% of the total.

The 1981 census recorded Baghpur as having a population of 857 people, in 141 households.

The 1961 census recorded Baghpur as comprising 1 hamlet, with a total population of 590 people (331 male and 259 female), in 113 households and 97 physical houses. The area of the village was given as 301 acres.

== Infrastructure ==
According to the data from 2011, Baghpur had 2 primary schools; however, it did not have any healthcare facilities. Drinking water was provided by hand pump and tube well/borehole; there were no public toilets. The village had a post office but no public library; there was at least some access to electricity for all purposes. Streets were made of both kachcha and pakka materials.
