= Sherpur Chuharpur =

Village in Uttar Pradesh, India

- Village
- Location in Uttar Pradesh, India
- Coordinates: 27.2733237°N 79.3011353°E
- Country: India
- State: Uttar Pradesh
- District: Mainpuri
- Tehsil: Bhongaon

Area
  - Total: 1.875 km^{2} (0.724 sq mi)

Population (2011)
  - Total: 626
  - Density: 334/km^{2} (865/sq mi)
- Time zone: UTC+5:30 (IST)

Sherpur Chuharpur (Śerpur Chūharpur) is a village in Bewar block of Mainpuri district, Uttar Pradesh. As of 2011, it has a population of 626, in 91 households.

== Demographics ==
As of 2011, Sherpur Chuharpur had a population of 626, in 91 households. This population was 52.7% male (330) and 47.3% female (296). The 0-6 age group numbered 101 (46 male and 55 female), or 16.1% of the total population. 143 residents were members of Scheduled Castes, or 22.8% of the total.

The 1981 census recorded Sherpur Chuharpur as having a population of 441 people, in 64 households.

The 1961 census recorded Sherpur Chuharpur as comprising 3 hamlets, with a total population of 313 people (170 male and 143 female), in 63 households and 51 physical houses. The area of the village was given as 442 acres.

== Infrastructure ==
As of 2011, Sherpur Chuharpur had 1 primary school; it did not have any healthcare facilities. Drinking water was provided by hand pump; there were no public toilets. The village had a post office but no public library; there was at least some access to electricity for all purposes. Streets were made of both kachcha and pakka materials.
