= Tiliyani =

Village in Uttar Pradesh, India

- Village
- Location in Uttar Pradesh, India
- Coordinates: 27.16858°N 79.36818°E
- Country: India
- State: Uttar Pradesh
- District: Mainpuri
- Tehsil: Bhongaon

Area
  - Total: 4.115 km^{2} (1.589 sq mi)

Population (2011)
  - Total: 3,177
  - Density: 772.1/km^{2} (2,000/sq mi)
- Time zone: UTC+5:30 (IST)

Tiliyani (Tiliyānī) is a village in Bewar block of Mainpuri district, Uttar Pradesh, India. As of 2011, it had a population of 3,177, in 524 households.

== Demographics ==
As of 2011, Tiliyani had a population of 3,177, in 524 households. This population was 53.3% male (1,694) and 46.7% female (1,483). The 0-6 age group numbered 466 (250 male and 216 female), or 14.7% of the total population. 538 residents were members of Scheduled Castes, or 16.9% of the total.

The 1981 census recorded Tiliyani as having a population of 1,835 people, in 320 households.

The 1961 census recorded Tiliyani as comprising 8 hamlets, with a total population of 1,263 people (681 male and 582 female), in 199 households and 155 physical houses. The area of the village was given as 1,013 acres and it had a post office at that point.

== Infrastructure ==
As of 2011, Tiliyani had 1 primary school and 1 TB clinic. Drinking water was provided by tap, hand pump, and tube well/borehole; there were no public toilets. The village had a post office but no public library; there was at least some access to electricity for all purposes. Streets were made of both kachcha and pakka materials.
