= Durjanpur =

Village in Uttar Pradesh, India

- Village
- Location in Uttar Pradesh, India
- Coordinates: 27.13853°N 79.34604°E
- Country: India
- State: Uttar Pradesh
- District: Mainpuri
- Tehsil: Bhongaon

Area
  - Total: 1.004 km^{2} (0.388 sq mi)

Population (2011)
  - Total: 506
  - Density: 504/km^{2} (1,310/sq mi)
- Time zone: UTC+5:30 (IST)

Durjanpur (Durjanpur) is a village in Bewar block of Mainpuri district, Uttar Pradesh. As of 2011, it has a population of 506, in 80 households.

== Demographics ==
As of 2011, Durjanpur had a population of 506, in 80 households. This population was 55.3% male (280) and 44.7% female (226). The 0-6 age group numbered 74 (41 male and 33 female), or 14.6% of the total population. 99 residents were members of Scheduled Castes, or 19.6% of the total.

The 1981 census recorded Durjanpur as having a population of 339 people, in 59 households.

The 1961 census recorded Durjanpur as comprising 2 hamlets, with a total population of 267 people (144 male and 123 female), in 46 households and 36 physical houses. The area of the village was given as 251 acres.

== Infrastructure ==
As of 2011, Durjanpur did not have any schools or healthcare facilities. Drinking water was provided by hand pump; there were no public toilets. The village had a post office but no public library; there was at least some access to electricity for all purposes. Streets were made of both kachcha and pakka materials.
