= Nagla Bal =

Village in Uttar Pradesh, India

- Village
- Location in Uttar Pradesh, India
- Coordinates: 27.17675°N 79.2483°E
- Country: India
- State: Uttar Pradesh
- District: Mainpuri
- Tehsil: Bhongaon

Area
  - Total: 0.854 km^{2} (0.330 sq mi)

Population (2011)
  - Total: 263
  - Density: 308/km^{2} (798/sq mi)
- Time zone: UTC+5:30 (IST)

Nagla Bal (Naglā Bāl), also transliterated as Nagla Baal, is a village in Bewar block of Mainpuri district, Uttar Pradesh. As of 2011, it has a population of 263, in 47 households.

== Demographics ==
As of 2011, Nagla Bal had a population of 263, in 47 households. This population was 55.9% male (147) and 44.1% female (116). The 0-6 age group numbered 27 (17 male and 10 female), or 10.3% of the total population. No residents were members of Scheduled Castes.

The 1981 census recorded Nagla Bal (spelled "Naglawal" in English, but Naglā Bāl in Devanagari) as having a population of 223 people, in 33 households.

The 1961 census recorded Nagla Bal as comprising 1 hamlet, with a total population of 175 people (82 male and 93 female), in 27 households and 17 physical houses. The area of the village was given as 214 acres.

== Infrastructure ==
As of 2011, Nagla Bal had 2 primary schools; it did not have any healthcare facilities. Drinking water was provided by hand pump and tube well/borehole; there were no public toilets. The village had a post office but no public library; there was at least some access to electricity for all purposes. Streets were made of both kachcha and pakka materials.
