= Chhabilepur =

Village in Uttar Pradesh, India

- Village
- Location in Uttar Pradesh, India
- Coordinates: 27.20551°N 79.36697°E
- Country: India
- State: Uttar Pradesh
- District: Mainpuri
- Tehsil: Bhongaon

Area
  - Total: 1.25 km^{2} (0.48 sq mi)

Population (2011)
  - Total: 1,409
  - Density: 1,130/km^{2} (2,920/sq mi)
- Time zone: UTC+5:30 (IST)

Chhabilepur (Chhabīlepur) is a village in Bewar block of Mainpuri district, Uttar Pradesh. As of 2011, it has a population of 1,409, in 226 households.

== Demographics ==
As of 2011, Chhabilepur had a population of 1,409, in 226 households. This population was 53.4% male (752) and 46.6% female (657). The 0-6 age group numbered 264 (121 male and 143 female), or 18.7% of the total population. 113 residents were members of Scheduled Castes, or 8.0% of the total.

The 1961 census recorded Chhabilepur as comprising 1 hamlet, with a total population of 457 people (249 male and 208 female), in 93 households and 45 physical houses. The area of the village was given as 366 acres.

== Infrastructure ==
As of 2011, Chhabilepur had 1 primary school; it did not have any healthcare facilities. Drinking water was provided by tap, hand pump, and tube well/borehole; there were no public toilets. The village had a post office but no public library; there was at least some access to electricity for all purposes. Streets were made of both kachcha and pakka materials.
