= Bajhera =

Village in Uttar Pradesh, India

- Village
- Location in Uttar Pradesh, India
- Coordinates: 27.21126°N 79.28478°E
- Country: India
- State: Uttar Pradesh
- District: Mainpuri
- Tehsil: Bhongaon

Area
  - Total: 7.581 km^{2} (2.927 sq mi)

Population (2011)
  - Total: 7,132
  - Density: 940.8/km^{2} (2,437/sq mi)
- Time zone: UTC+5:30 (IST)
- PIN: 206301

Bajhera (Bajheṛā) is a village in Bewar block of Mainpuri district, Uttar Pradesh. As of 2011, it had a population of 7,132, in 1,226 households.

== Geography ==
There is a prominent jhil at Bajhera.

== Demographics ==
As of 2011, Bajhera had a population of 7,132, in 1,226 households. This population was 51.9% male (3,700) and 48.1% female (3,432). The 0-6 age group numbered 1,146 (572 male and 574 female), or 16.1% of the total population. 1,596 residents were members of Scheduled Castes, or 22.4% of the total.

The 1981 census recorded Bajhera as having a population of 4,228 people, in 688 households.

The 1961 census recorded Bajhera as comprising 7 hamlets, with a total population of 3,012 people (1,652 male and 1,360 female), in 518 households and 284 physical houses. The area of the village was given as 1,906 acres and it had a post office at that point.

== Infrastructure ==
As of 2011, Bajhera had 1 primary school; it did not have any healthcare facilities. Drinking water was provided by hand pump and tube well/borehole; there were no public toilets. The village had a post office but no public library; there was at least some access to electricity for all purposes. Streets were made of both kachcha and pakka materials.
