= Puraiya =

Village in Uttar Pradesh, India

- Village
- Location in Uttar Pradesh, India
- Coordinates: 27.20145°N 79.32101°E
- Country: India
- State: Uttar Pradesh
- District: Mainpuri
- Tehsil: Bhongaon

Area
  - Total: 1.137 km^{2} (0.439 sq mi)

Population (2011)
  - Total: 1,200
  - Density: 1,100/km^{2} (2,700/sq mi)
- Time zone: UTC+5:30 (IST)

Puraiya (Puraiyā) is a village in Bewar block of Mainpuri district, Uttar Pradesh. As of 2011, it has a population of 1,200, in 198 households.

== Demographics ==
As of 2011, Puraiya had a population of 1,200, in 198 households. This population was 54.0% male (648) and 46.0% female (552). The 0-6 age group numbered 141 (75 male and 66 female), or 11.75% of the total population. 62 residents were members of Scheduled Castes, or 5.2% of the total.

The 1981 census recorded Puraiya as having a population of 828 people, in 142 households.

The 1961 census recorded Puraiya as comprising 1 hamlet, with a total population of 603 people (328 male and 275 female), in 97 households and 73 physical houses. The area of the village was given as 346 acres.

== Infrastructure ==
As of 2011, Puraiya had 1 primary school; it did not have any healthcare facilities. Drinking water was provided by hand pump and tube well/borehole; there were no public toilets. The village did not have a post office or public library; there was at least some access to electricity for all purposes. Streets were made of both kachcha and pakka materials.
