= Lodhipur, Bewar =

Village in Uttar Pradesh, India

Lodhipur
- Village
- Location in Uttar Pradesh, India
- Coordinates: 27.21101°N 79.26076°E
- Country: India
- State: Uttar Pradesh
- District: Mainpuri
- Tehsil: Bhongaon

Area
  - Total: 0.494 km^{2} (0.191 sq mi)

Population (2011)
  - Total: 594
  - Density: 1,200/km^{2} (3,110/sq mi)
- Time zone: UTC+5:30 (IST)

Lodhipur (Lodhīpur) is a village in Bewar block of Mainpuri district, Uttar Pradesh, India. As of 2011, it had a population of 594, in 90 households.

== Demographics ==
As of 2011, Lodhipur had a population of 594, in 90 households. This population was 53.4% male (317) and 46.6% female (277). The 0-6 age group numbered 97 (47 male and 50 female), or 16.3% of the total population. 299 residents were members of Scheduled Castes, or 50.3% of the total.

The 1981 census recorded Lodhipur as having a population of 343 people, in 49 households.

The 1961 census recorded Lodhipur as comprising 1 hamlets, with a total population of 218 people (116 male and 102 female), in 38 households and 24 physical houses. The area of the village was given as 124 acres.

== Infrastructure ==
As of 2011, Lodhipur had 1 primary school; it did not have any healthcare facilities. Drinking water was provided by hand pump and tube well/borehole; there were no public toilets. The village had a post office but no public library; there was at least some access to electricity for all purposes. Streets were made of both kachcha and pakka materials.
