= Manpur Biku =

Village in Uttar Pradesh, India

- Village
- Location in Uttar Pradesh, India
- Coordinates: 27.24518°N 79.29398°E
- Country: India
- State: Uttar Pradesh
- District: Mainpuri
- Tehsil: Bhongaon

Area
  - Total: 0.922 km^{2} (0.356 sq mi)

Population (2011)
  - Total: 674
  - Density: 731/km^{2} (1,890/sq mi)
- Time zone: UTC+5:30 (IST)

Manpur Biku (Mānpur Bikū) is a village in Bewar block of Mainpuri district, Uttar Pradesh. As of 2011, it has a population of 674, in 108 households.

== Demographics ==
As of 2011, Manpur Biku had a population of 674, in 108 households. This population was 55.6% male (375) and 44.4% female (299). The 0-6 age group numbered 63 (37 male and 26 female), or 9.3% of the total population. No residents were members of Scheduled Castes.

The 1981 census recorded Manpur Biku as having a population of 408 people, in 67 households.

The 1961 census recorded Manpur Biku as comprising 1 hamlet, with a total population of 288 people (163 male and 125 female), in 54 households and 39 physical houses. The area of the village was given as 229 acres.

== Infrastructure ==
As of 2011, Manpur Biku had 1 primary school; it did not have any healthcare facilities. Drinking water was provided by hand pump and tube well/borehole; there were no public toilets. The village had a post office but no public library; there was at least some access to electricity for all purposes. Streets were made of pakka materials.
