= Padamner =

Village in Uttar Pradesh, India

- Village
- Location in Uttar Pradesh, India
- Coordinates: 27.14204°N 79.3004°E
- Country: India
- State: Uttar Pradesh
- District: Mainpuri
- Tehsil: Bhongaon

Area
  - Total: 3.026 km^{2} (1.168 sq mi)

Population (2011)
  - Total: 1,937
  - Density: 640.1/km^{2} (1,658/sq mi)
- Time zone: UTC+5:30 (IST)

Padamner (Padamner) is a village in Bewar block of Mainpuri district, Uttar Pradesh. As of 2011, it has a population of 1,937, in 287 households.

== Demographics ==
As of 2011, Padamner had a population of 1,937, in 287 households. This population was 54.3% male (1,052) and 45.7% female (885). The 0-6 age group numbered 254 (134 male and 120 female), or 13.1% of the total population. 338 residents were members of Scheduled Castes, or 17.4% of the total.

The 1981 census recorded Padamner as having a population of 1,147 people, in 192 households.

The 1961 census recorded Padamner as comprising 4 hamlets, with a total population of 857 people (468 male and 389 female), in 155 households and 109 physical houses. The area of the village was given as 759 acres.

== Infrastructure ==
As of 2011, Padamner had 1 primary school; it did not have any healthcare facilities. Drinking water was provided by tap, well, hand pump, and tube well/borehole; there were no public toilets. The village had a post office but no public library; there was at least some access to electricity for all purposes. Streets were made of both kachcha and pakka materials.
