= Rampur, Mainpuri =

Village in Uttar Pradesh, India

Rampur
- Village
- Location in Uttar Pradesh, India
- Coordinates: 27.24462°N 79.26644°E
- Country: India
- State: Uttar Pradesh
- District: Mainpuri
- Tehsil: Bhongaon

Area
  - Total: 0.631 km^{2} (0.244 sq mi)

Population (2011)
  - Total: 532
  - Density: 843/km^{2} (2,180/sq mi)
- Time zone: UTC+5:30 (IST)

Rampur (Rāmpur) is a village in Bewar block of Mainpuri district, Uttar Pradesh, India. As of 2011, it had a population of 532, in 93 households.

== Demographics ==
As of 2011, Rampur had a population of 532, in 93 households. This population was 51.7% male (275) and 48.3% female (257). The 0-6 age group numbered 81 (38 male and 43 female), or 15.2% of the total population. 177 residents were members of Scheduled Castes, or 33.3% of the total.

The 1981 census recorded Rampur as having a population of 390 people, in 72 households.

The 1961 census recorded Rampur as comprising 1 hamlet, with a total population of 252 people (138 male and 114 female), in 54 households and 40 physical houses. The area of the village was given as 168 acres.

== Infrastructure ==
As of 2011, Rampur had 1 primary school; it did not have any healthcare facilities. Drinking water was provided by hand pump and tube well/borehole; there were no public toilets. The village had a post office but no public library; there was at least some access to electricity for all purposes. Streets were made of both kachcha and pakka materials.
