= Fatehpur Gani =

Village in Uttar Pradesh, India

- Village
- Location in Uttar Pradesh, India
- Coordinates: 27°11′36″N 79°17′49″E
- Country: India
- State: Uttar Pradesh
- District: Mainpuri
- Tehsil: Bhongaon

Area
  - Total: 0.90 km^{2} (0.35 sq mi)

Population (2011)
  - Total: 1,238
  - Density: 1,400/km^{2} (3,600/sq mi)
- Time zone: UTC+5:30 (IST)
- PIN: 206301

Fatehpur Gani (Fatehpur Ganī) is a village in Bewar block of Mainpuri district, Uttar Pradesh, India. As of 2011, it had a population of 1,238, in 208 households.

== Demographics ==
As of 2011, Fatehpur Gani had a population of 1,238, in 208 households. This population was 52.8% male (654) and 47.2% female (584). The 0-6 age group numbered 198 (106 male and 92 female), or 16.0% of the total population. 307 residents were members of Scheduled Castes or 24.8% of the total.

The 1981 census recorded Fatehpur Gani as having a population of 231 people, in 104 households.

The 1961 census recorded Fatehpur Gani, (as "Fatehpur Gant") as comprising 2 hamlets, with a total population of 542 people (297 male and 245 female), in 114 households and 92 physical houses. The area of the village was given as 244 acres.

== Infrastructure ==
As of 2011, Fatehpur Gani had 2 primary schools; it did not have any healthcare facilities. Drinking water was provided by hand pump; there were no public toilets. The village had a post office but no public library; there was at least some access to electricity for all purposes. Streets were made of both kachcha and pakka materials.
