= Bilsara =

Village in Uttar Pradesh, India

- Village
- Location in Uttar Pradesh, India
- Coordinates: 27.25329°N 79.25708°E
- Country: India
- State: Uttar Pradesh
- District: Mainpuri
- Tehsil: Bhongaon

Area
  - Total: 0.88 km^{2} (0.34 sq mi)

Population (2011)
  - Total: 1,023
  - Density: 1,200/km^{2} (3,000/sq mi)
- Time zone: UTC+5:30 (IST)

Bilsara (Bilsarā) is a village in Bewar block of Mainpuri district, Uttar Pradesh, India. As of 2011, it had a population of 1,023, in 171 households.

== Demographics ==
As of 2011, Bilsara had a population of 1,023, in 171 households. This population was 53.5% male (547) and 46.5% female (476). The 0-6 age group numbered 166 (86 male and 80 female), or 16.2% of the total population. 474 residents were members of Scheduled Castes, or 46.3% of the total.

The 1981 census recorded Bilsara as having a population of 564 people, in 92 households.

The 1961 census recorded Bilsara as comprising 1 hamlet, with a total population of 363 people (217 male and 146 female), in 53 households and 49 physical houses. The area of the village was given as 224 acres.

== Infrastructure ==
As of 2011, Bilsara did not have any schools or healthcare facilities. Drinking water was provided by hand pump and tube well/borehole; there were no public toilets. The village had a post office but no public library; there was at least some access to electricity for all purposes. Streets were made of pakka materials.
