= Paraunkha =

Village in Uttar Pradesh, India

- Village
- Location in Uttar Pradesh, India
- Coordinates: 27.16087°N 79.31142°E
- Country: India
- State: Uttar Pradesh
- District: Mainpuri
- Tehsil: Bhongaon

Area
  - Total: 10.902 km^{2} (4.209 sq mi)

Population (2011)
  - Total: 8,198
  - Density: 752.0/km^{2} (1,948/sq mi)
- Time zone: UTC+5:30 (IST)
- PIN: 206301

Paraunkha (Parauṅkhā) is a village in Bewar block of Mainpuri district, Uttar Pradesh, India. As of 2011, it had a population of 8,198, in 1,390 households.

== Geography ==
Paraunkha is located southeast of the town of Bewar, in a tract of fertile loamy soil at what was historically at the southeastern corner of pargana Bewar. There is a prominent jhil on village lands.

== Demographics ==
As of 2011, Paraunkha had a population of 8,198, in 1,390 households. This population was 53.3% male (4,368) and 46.7% female (3,830). The 0-6 age group numbered 1,231 (619 male and 612 female), or 15.0% of the total population. 2,243 residents were members of Scheduled Castes, or 27.4% of the total.

The 1981 census recorded Paraunkha (as "Paraukha") as having a population of 5,623 people, in 902 households.

The 1961 census recorded Paraunkha (as "Paronkha") as comprising 13 hamlets, with a total population of 3,891 people (2,130 male and 1,761 female), in 707 households and 536 physical houses. The area of the village was given as 2,799 acres and it had a post office at that point.

== Infrastructure ==
As of 2011, Paraunkha had 3 primary schools; it did not have any healthcare facilities. Drinking water was provided by tap, hand pump, and tube well/borehole; there were no public toilets. The village had a post office but no public library; there was at least some access to electricity for all purposes. Streets were made of both kachcha and pakka materials.
