= Jalalpur Dikhatmai =

Village in Uttar Pradesh, India

- Village
- Location in Uttar Pradesh, India
- Coordinates: 27.1917776°N 79.238621°E
- Country: India
- State: Uttar Pradesh
- District: Mainpuri
- Tehsil: Bhongaon

Area
  - Total: 1.373 km^{2} (0.530 sq mi)

Population (2011)
  - Total: 1,122
  - Density: 817.2/km^{2} (2,117/sq mi)
- Time zone: UTC+5:30 (IST)

Jalalpur Dikhatmai (Jalālpur Dikhatmaī) is a village in Bewar block of Mainpuri district, Uttar Pradesh. As of 2011, it has a population of 1,122, in 185 households.

== Demographics ==
As of 2011, Jalalpur Dikhatmai had a population of 1,122, in 185 households. This population was 53.9% male (605) and 46.1% female (517). The 0-6 age group numbered 155 (85 male and 70 female), or 13.8% of the total population. 77 residents were members of Scheduled Castes, or 6.9% of the total.

The 1981 census recorded Jalalpur Dikhatmai as having a population of 744 people, in 104 households.

== Infrastructure ==
As of 2011, Jalalpur Dikhatmai had 2 primary schools; it did not have any healthcare facilities. Drinking water was provided by hand pump and tube well/borehole; there were no public toilets. The village did not have a post office or public library; there was at least some access to electricity for all purposes. Streets were made of both kachcha and pakka materials.
