= Madhupuri, Bewar =

Village in Uttar Pradesh, India

Madhupuri
- Village
- Location in Uttar Pradesh, India
- Coordinates: 27.15607°N 79.37122°E
- Country: India
- State: Uttar Pradesh
- District: Mainpuri
- Tehsil: Bhongaon

Area
  - Total: 2.938 km^{2} (1.134 sq mi)

Population (2011)
  - Total: 1,649
  - Density: 561.3/km^{2} (1,454/sq mi)
- Time zone: UTC+5:30 (IST)
- PIN: 206301

Madhupuri (Madhupurī) is a village in Bewar block of Mainpuri district, Uttar Pradesh, India. As of 2011, it had a population of 1,649, in 879 households.

== Demographics ==
As of 2011, Madhupuri had a population of 1,649, in 879 households. This population was 53.3% male (879) and 46.7% female (770). The 0-6 age group numbered 227 (122 male and 105 female), or 13.8% of the total population. 378 residents were members of Scheduled Castes, or 22.9% of the total.

The 1981 census recorded Madhupuri as having a population of 1,035 people, in 171 households.

The 1961 census recorded Madhupuri (as "Madapuri") as comprising 2 hamlets, with a total population of 673 people (359 male and 314 female), in 128 households and 107 physical houses. The area of the village was given as 604 acres.

== Infrastructure ==
As of 2011, Madhupuri had 1 primary school; it did not have any healthcare facilities. Drinking water was provided by tap and hand pump; there were no public toilets. The village did not have a post office or public library; there was at least some access to electricity for all purposes. Streets were made of both kachcha and pakka materials.
