= Bahdinpur =

Village in Uttar Pradesh, India

- Village
- Location in Uttar Pradesh, India
- Coordinates: 27.18893°N 79.34241°E
- Country: India
- State: Uttar Pradesh
- District: Mainpuri
- Tehsil: Bhongaon

Area
  - Total: 0.886 km^{2} (0.342 sq mi)

Population (2011)
  - Total: 542
  - Density: 612/km^{2} (1,580/sq mi)
- Time zone: UTC+5:30 (IST)

Bahdinpur (Bahdīnpur) is a village in Bewar block of Mainpuri district, Uttar Pradesh, India. As of 2011, it had a population of 542, in 83 households.

== Demographics ==
As of 2011, Bahdinpur had a population of 542, in 83 households. This population was 53.0% male (287) and 47.0% female (255). The 0-6 age group numbered 68 (37 male and 31 female), or 12.5% of the total population. 19 residents were members of Scheduled Castes, or 3.5% of the total.

The 1981 census recorded Bahdinpur as having a population of 403 people, in 64 households.

The 1961 census recorded Bahdinpur (as "Behdinpur") as comprising 1 hamlet, with a total population of 205 people (127 male and 78 female), in 45 households and 32 physical houses. The area of the village was given as 210 acres.

== Infrastructure ==
As of 2011, Bahdinpur did not have any schools or healthcare facilities. Drinking water was provided by tap, hand pump, and tube well/borehole; there were no public toilets. The village had a post office but no public library; there was at least some access to electricity for all purposes. Streets were made of kachcha materials.
