= Janaura =

Village in Uttar Pradesh, India

- Village
- Location in Uttar Pradesh, India
- Coordinates: 27°10′31″N 79°22′32″E
- Country: India
- State: Uttar Pradesh
- District: Mainpuri
- Tehsil: Bhongaon

Area
  - Total: 2.729 km^{2} (1.054 sq mi)

Population (2011)
  - Total: 2,394
  - Density: 877.2/km^{2} (2,272/sq mi)
- Time zone: UTC+5:30 (IST)

Janaura (Janaurā) is a village in Bewar block of Mainpuri district, Uttar Pradesh, India. As of 2011, it had a population of 2,394, in 430 households.

== Demographics ==
As of 2011, Janaura had a population of 2,394, in 430 households. This population was 52.8% male (1,265) and 47.2% female (1,129). The 0-6 age group numbered 358 (177 male and 181 female), or 15.0% of the total population. 740 residents were members of Scheduled Castes, or 30.9% of the total.

The 1981 census recorded Janaura as having a population of 1,340 people, in 235 households.

The 1961 census recorded Janaura as comprising 3 hamlets, with a total population of 886 people (479 male and 407 female), in 127 households and 124 physical houses. The area of the village was given as 686 acres.

== Infrastructure ==
As of 2011, Janaura had 1 primary school; it did not have any healthcare facilities. Drinking water was provided by hand pump; there were no public toilets. The village had a post office but no public library; there was at least some access to electricity for residential and commercial (but not agricultural) purposes. Streets were made of both kachcha and pakka materials.
