= Chirawar =

Village in Uttar Pradesh, India

- Village
- Location in Uttar Pradesh, India
- Coordinates: 27.12313°N 79.37736°E
- Country: India
- State: Uttar Pradesh
- District: Mainpuri
- Tehsil: Bhongaon

Area
  - Total: 4.543 km^{2} (1.754 sq mi)

Population (2011)
  - Total: 2,079
  - Density: 457.6/km^{2} (1,185/sq mi)
- Time zone: UTC+5:30 (IST)

Chirawar (Chirāwar) is a village in Bewar block of Mainpuri district, Uttar Pradesh, India. As of 2011, it had a population of 2,079, in 319 households.

== Demographics ==
As of 2011, Chirawar had a population of 2,079, in 319 households. This population was 53.1% male (1,103) and 46.9% female (976). The 0-6 age group numbered 318 (170 male and 148 female), or 15.3% of the total population. 458 residents were members of Scheduled Castes, or 22.0% of the total.

The 1981 census recorded Chirawar as having a population of 1,345 people, in 211 households.

The 1961 census recorded Chirawar as comprising 4 hamlets, with a total population of 937 people (509 male and 428 female), in 163 households and 135 physical houses. The area of the village was given as 1,116 acres.

== Infrastructure ==
As of 2011, Chirawar had 1 primary school and 1 primary health centre. Drinking water was provided by hand pump; there were no public toilets. The village had a post office but no public library; there was at least some access to electricity for all purposes. Streets were made of both kachcha and pakka materials.
