= Maheshpur, Mainpuri =

Village in Uttar Pradesh, India

Maheshpur
- Village
- Location in Uttar Pradesh, India
- Coordinates: 27.12976°N 79.29857°E
- Country: India
- State: Uttar Pradesh
- District: Mainpuri
- Tehsil: Bhongaon

Area
  - Total: 1.056 km^{2} (0.408 sq mi)

Population (2011)
  - Total: 176
  - Density: 167/km^{2} (432/sq mi)
- Time zone: UTC+5:30 (IST)

Maheshpur (Maheśpur) is a village in Bewar block of Mainpuri district, Uttar Pradesh. As of 2011, it has a population of 176, in 32 households.

== Demographics ==
As of 2011, Maheshpur had a population of 176, in 32 households. This population was 57.4% male (101) and 42.6% female (75). The 0-6 age group numbered 25 (17 male and 8 female), or 14.2% of the total population. No residents were members of Scheduled Castes.

The 1981 census recorded Maheshpur as having a population of 104 people, in 12 households.

The 1961 census recorded Maheshpur as comprising 1 hamlet, with a total population of 45 people (23 male and 22 female), in 7 households and 5 physical houses. The area of the village was given as 265 acres.

== Infrastructure ==
As of 2011, Maheshpur did not have any schools or healthcare facilities. Drinking water was provided by well, hand pump, and tube well/borehole; there were no public toilets. The village had a post office but no public library; there was at least some access to electricity for agricultural and commercial (but not residential) purposes. Streets were made of both kachcha and pakka materials.
