= Hajipur Baran =

Village in Uttar Pradesh, India

- Village
- Location in Uttar Pradesh, India
- Coordinates: 27.1792323°N 79.3398254°E
- Country: India
- State: Uttar Pradesh
- District: Mainpuri
- Tehsil: Bhongaon

Area
  - Total: 1.036 km^{2} (0.400 sq mi)

Population (2011)
  - Total: 0
  - Density: 0.0/km^{2} (0.0/sq mi)
- Time zone: UTC+5:30 (IST)

Hajipur Baran (Hājīpur Baran) is an abandoned village in Bewar block of Mainpuri district, Uttar Pradesh, India. As of 2011, it was unpopulated, although the land remains under human use.

== Demographics ==
The 2011 census recorded Hajipur Baran with a population of 0, as did the 1981 census.

The 1961 census, however, recorded Hajipur Baran as being inhabited: it comprised 1 hamlet, with a total population of 25 people (14 male and 11 female), in 6 households and 4 physical houses. The area of the village was given as 261 acres.

== Land use ==
According to the 2011 census, Hajipur Baran has a total area of 103.6 hectares, of which 86.8 were currently farmland, 11.6 were fallow lands, and 4.8 were under non-agricultural use. 0.3 hectares were occupied by orchards, and the remaining 4.8 hectares were classified as non-cultivable wasteland. No forests or permanent pastures existed on village lands.
