= Bhur Patia =

Village in Uttar Pradesh, India

- Village
- Location in Uttar Pradesh, India
- Coordinates: 27.2651°N 79.26002°E
- Country: India
- State: Uttar Pradesh
- District: Mainpuri
- Tehsil: Bhongaon

Area
  - Total: 0.307 km^{2} (0.119 sq mi)

Population (2011)
  - Total: 407
  - Density: 1,330/km^{2} (3,430/sq mi)
- Time zone: UTC+5:30 (IST)

Bhur Patia (Bhur Paṭiyā) is a village in Bewar block of Mainpuri district, Uttar Pradesh India. As of 2011, it had a population of 407, in 55 households.

== Demographics ==
As of 2011, Bhur Patia had a population of 407, in 55 households. This population was 51.4% male (209) and 48.6% female (198). The 0-6 age group numbered 52 (28 male and 24 female), or 12.8% of the total population. 1 resident was a member of a Scheduled Caste, or 0.2% of the total.

The 1981 census recorded Bhur Patia (spelled as one word, "Bhurpatia") as having a population of 205 people, in 34 households.

The 1961 census recorded Bhur Patia (as "Bhur Patiya") as comprising 1 hamlet, with a total population of 136 people (69 male and 67 female), in 19 households and 14 physical houses. The area of the village was given as 80 acres.

== Infrastructure ==
As of 2011, Bhur Patia had 1 primary school; it did not have any healthcare facilities. Drinking water was provided by hand pump and tube well/borehole; there were no public toilets. The village did not have a post office or public library; there was at least some access to electricity for all purposes. Streets were made of pakka materials.
