= Todarpur, Mainpuri =

Village in Uttar Pradesh, India

Todarpur
- Village
- Location in Uttar Pradesh, India
- Coordinates: 27.13811°N 79.33217°E
- Country: India
- State: Uttar Pradesh
- District: Mainpuri
- Tehsil: Bhongaon

Area
  - Total: 2.232 km^{2} (0.862 sq mi)

Population (2011)
  - Total: 2,004
  - Density: 897.8/km^{2} (2,325/sq mi)
- Time zone: UTC+5:30 (IST)
- PIN: 209720

Todarpur (Ṭoḍarpur) is a village in Bewar block of Mainpuri district, Uttar Pradesh, India. As of 2011, it had a population of 2,004, in 318 households.

== Demographics ==
As of 2011, Todarpur had a population of 2,004, in 318 households. This population was 54.9% male (1,101) and 45.1% female (903). The 0-6 age group numbered 324 (178 male and 146 female), or 16.2% of the total population. 495 residents were members of Scheduled Castes, or 24.7% of the total.

The 1981 census recorded Todarpur as having a population of 1,451 people, in 267 households.

The 1961 census recorded Todarpur as comprising 1 hamlet, with a total population of 1,106 people (565 male and 541 female), in 214 households and 169 physical houses. The area of the village was given as 477 acres and it had a post office at that point.

== Infrastructure ==
As of 2011, Todarpur had 1 primary schools and 1 veterinary hospital but no healthcare facilities for humans. Drinking water was provided by hand pump and tube well/borehole; there were no public toilets. The village had a post office but no public library; there was at least some access to electricity for all purposes. Streets were made of both kachcha and pakka materials.
