= Chandanpur, Mainpuri =

Village in Uttar Pradesh, India

Chandanpur
- Village
- Location in Uttar Pradesh, India
- Coordinates: 27.26794°N 79.29944°E
- Country: India
- State: Uttar Pradesh
- District: Mainpuri
- Tehsil: Bhongaon

Area
  - Total: 0.778 km^{2} (0.300 sq mi)

Population (2011)
  - Total: 443
  - Density: 569/km^{2} (1,470/sq mi)
- Time zone: UTC+5:30 (IST)

Chandanpur is a village in Bewar block of Mainpuri district, Uttar Pradesh, India. As of 2011, it had a population of 443, in 63 households.

== Demographics ==
As of 2011, Chandanpur had a population of 443, in 63 households. This population was 53.7% male (238) and 46.3% female (205). The 0-6 age group numbered 67 (38 male and 29 female), or 15.1% of the total population. 5 residents were members of Scheduled Castes, or 1.1% of the total.

The 1981 census recorded Chandanpur as having a population of 224 people, in 31 households.

The 1961 census recorded Chandanpur as comprising 1 hamlet, with a total population of 142 people (71 male and 71 female), in 18 households and 13 physical houses. The area of the village was given as 195 acres.

== Infrastructure ==
As of 2011, Chandanpur had 2 primary schools; it did not have any healthcare facilities. Drinking water was provided by hand pump; there were no public toilets. The village had a post office but no public library; there was at least some access to electricity for all purposes. Streets were made of both kachcha and pakka materials.
