= Jakha =

Village in Uttar Pradesh, India

- Village
- Location in Uttar Pradesh, India
- Coordinates: 27.14747°N 79.27021°E
- Country: India
- State: Uttar Pradesh
- District: Mainpuri
- Tehsil: Bhongaon

Area
  - Total: 2.37 km^{2} (0.92 sq mi)

Population (2011)
  - Total: 2,067
  - Density: 872/km^{2} (2,260/sq mi)
- Time zone: UTC+5:30 (IST)

Jakha (Jakhā) is a village in Bewar block of Mainpuri district, Uttar Pradesh, India. As of 2011, it had a population of 2,067, in 373 households.

== Demographics ==
As of 2011, Jakha had a population of 2,067, in 373 households. This population was 53.5% male (1,105) and 46.5% female (962). The 0-6 age group numbered 310 (149 male and 161 female), or 15.0% of the total population. 512 residents were members of Scheduled Castes, or 24.8% of the total.

The 1981 census recorded Jakha as having a population of 623 people, in 104 households.

The 1961 census recorded Jakha as comprising 5 hamlets, with a total population of 903 people (472 male and 431 female), in 172 households and 111 physical houses. The area of the village was given as 561 acres.

== Infrastructure ==
As of 2011, Jakha had 1 primary school; it did not have any healthcare facilities. Drinking water was provided by tap, hand pump, and tube well/borehole; there were no public toilets. The village had a post office and public library, as well as at least some access to electricity for all purposes. Streets were made of both kachcha and pakka materials.
