= Jagatpur Dikhatmai =

Village in Uttar Pradesh, India

Jagatput Dikhatmai
- Village
- Location in Uttar Pradesh, India
- Coordinates: 27.15307°N 79.27783°E
- Country: India
- State: Uttar Pradesh
- District: Mainpuri
- Tehsil: Bhongaon

Area
  - Total: 1.375 km^{2} (0.531 sq mi)

Population (2011)
  - Total: 522
  - Density: 380/km^{2} (983/sq mi)
- Time zone: UTC+5:30 (IST)

Jagatpur Dikhatmai (Jagatpur Dikhatmaī) is a village in Bewar block of Mainpuri district, Uttar Pradesh. As of 2011, it has a population of 522, in 85 households.

== Demographics ==
As of 2011, Jagatpur Dikhatmai had a population of 522, in 85 households. This population was 56.7% male (296) and 43.3% female (226). The 0-6 age group numbered 83 (44 male and 39 female), or 15.9% of the total population. 68 residents were members of Scheduled Castes, or 13.0% of the total.

The 1981 census recorded Jagatpur Dikhatmai as having a population of 371 people, in 59 households.

The 1961 census recorded Jagatpur Dikhatmai as comprising 2 hamlets, with a total population of 234 people (133 male and 101 female), in 46 households and 25 physical houses. The area of the village was given as 347 acres.

== Infrastructure ==
As of 2011, Jagatpur Dikhatmai had 1 primary school; it did not have any healthcare facilities. Drinking water was provided by hand pump and tube well/borehole; there were no public toilets. The village had a post office but no public library; there was at least some access to electricity for all purposes. Streets were made of both kachcha and pakka materials.
