= Kushalpur =

Village in Uttar Pradesh, India

- Village
- Location in Uttar Pradesh, India
- Coordinates: 27.24958°N 79.25915°E
- Country: India
- State: Uttar Pradesh
- District: Mainpuri
- Tehsil: Bhongaon

Area
  - Total: 0.622 km^{2} (0.240 sq mi)

Population (2011)
  - Total: 857
  - Density: 1,380/km^{2} (3,570/sq mi)
- Time zone: UTC+5:30 (IST)

Kushalpur (Kuśalpur) is a village in Bewar block of Mainpuri district, Uttar Pradesh. As of 2011, it has a population of 857, in 140 households.

== Demographics ==
As of 2011, Kushalpur had a population of 857, in 140 households. This population was 42.2% male (467) and 57.8% female (390). The 0-6 age group numbered 131 (75 male and 56 female), or 7.6% of the total population. 316 residents were members of Scheduled Castes, or 58.5% of the total.

The 1981 census recorded Kushalpur as having a population of 471 people, in 76 households.

The 1961 census recorded Kushalpur as comprising 1 hamlet, with a total population of 366 people (188 male and 178 female), in 54 households and 45 physical houses. The area of the village was given as 159 acres.

== Infrastructure ==
As of 2011, Kushalpur did not have any schools or healthcare facilities. Drinking water was provided by hand pump and tube well/borehole; there were no public toilets. The village had a post office but no public library; there was at least some access to electricity for all purposes. Streets were made of pakka materials.
