= Nasirpur, Bewar =

Village in Uttar Pradesh, India

Nasirpur
- Village
- Location in Uttar Pradesh, India
- Coordinates: 27.26172°N 79.31926°E
- Country: India
- State: Uttar Pradesh
- District: Mainpuri
- Tehsil: Bhongaon

Area
  - Total: 1.146 km^{2} (0.442 sq mi)

Population (2011)
  - Total: 440
  - Density: 380/km^{2} (990/sq mi)
- Time zone: UTC+5:30 (IST)

Nasirpur (Nasīrpur) is a village in Bewar block of Mainpuri district, Uttar Pradesh, India. As of 2011, it had a population of 440, in 77 households.

== Demographics ==
As of 2011, Nasirpur had a population of 440, in 77 households. This population was 53.0% male (233) and 47.0% female (207). The 0-6 age group numbered 54 (27 male and 27 female), or 12.3% of the total population. 85 residents were members of Scheduled Castes, or 19.3% of the total.

The 1981 census recorded Nasirpur as having a population of 292 people, in 58 households.

The 1961 census recorded Nasirpur as comprising 2 hamlets, with a total population of 176 people (98 male and 78 female), in 27 households and 15 physical houses. The area of the village was given as 283 acres.

== Infrastructure ==
As of 2011, Nasirpur had 2 primary schools; it did not have any healthcare facilities. Drinking water was provided by hand pump and tube well/borehole; there were no public toilets. The village had a post office but no public library; there was at least some access to electricity for all purposes. Streets were made of kachcha materials.
