= Daudpur, Bewar =

Village in Uttar Pradesh, India

Daudpur
- Village
- Location in Uttar Pradesh, India
- Coordinates: 27.17434°N 79.36339°E
- Country: India
- State: Uttar Pradesh
- District: Mainpuri
- Tehsil: Bhongaon

Area
  - Total: 0.948 km^{2} (0.366 sq mi)

Population (2011)
  - Total: 1,222
  - Density: 1,290/km^{2} (3,340/sq mi)
- Time zone: UTC+5:30 (IST)

Daudpur (Dāūdpur) is a village in Bewar block of Mainpuri district, Uttar Pradesh, India As of 2011, it had a population of 1,222, in 200 households.

== Demographics ==
As of 2011, Daudpur had a population of 1,222, in 200 households. This population was 52.1% male (637) and 47.9% female (585). The 0-6 age group numbered 206 (106 male and 100 female), or 16.9% of the total population. 520 residents were members of Scheduled Castes, or 42.6% of the total.

The 1981 census recorded Daudpur as having a population of 743 people, in 125 households.

The 1961 census recorded Daudpur (as "Daundapur") as comprising 1 hamlet, with a total population of 573 people (306 male and 267 female), in 104 households and 88 physical houses. The area of the village was given as 235 acres.

== Infrastructure ==
As of 2011, Daudpur had 1 primary school; it did not have any healthcare facilities. Drinking water was provided by hand pump; there were no public toilets. The village had a post office but no public library; there was at least some access to electricity for all purposes. Streets were made of both kachcha and pakka materials.
