= Nagla Murar =

Village in Uttar Pradesh, India

- Village
- Location in Uttar Pradesh, India
- Coordinates: 27.2439°N 79.31137°E
- Country: India
- State: Uttar Pradesh
- District: Mainpuri
- Tehsil: Bhongaon

Area
  - Total: 0.817 km^{2} (0.315 sq mi)

Population (2011)
  - Total: 173
  - Density: 212/km^{2} (548/sq mi)
- Time zone: UTC+5:30 (IST)

Nagla Murar (Naglā Murār) is a village in Bewar block of Mainpuri district, Uttar Pradesh. As of 2011, it has a population of 173, in 23 households.

== Name ==
Naglā is a Hindi word meaning "village" (related to the word nagar, meaning "city"), while murār is a Brajbhāṣā word referring to the root or stalk of the lotus.

== Demographics ==
As of 2011, Nagla Murar had a population of 173, in 23 households. This population was 54.5% male (96) and 44.5% female (77). The 0-6 age group numbered 34 (19 male and 15 female), or 19.7% of the total population. No residents were members of Scheduled Castes.

The 1981 census recorded Nagla Murar as having a population of 100 people, in 11 households.

The 1961 census recorded Nagla Murar as comprising 1 hamlet, with a total population of 61 people (32 male and 29 female), in 14 households and 10 physical houses. The area of the village was given as 203 acres.

== Infrastructure ==
As of 2011, Nagla Murar did not have any schools or healthcare facilities. Drinking water was provided by hand pump and tube well/borehole; there were no public toilets. The village had a post office but no public library; there was at least some access to electricity for all purposes. Streets were made of pakka materials.
