= Joga, Uttar Pradesh =

Village in Uttar Pradesh, India

Joga
- Village
- Location in Uttar Pradesh, India
- Coordinates: 27.1936836°N 79.3224453°E
- Country: India
- State: Uttar Pradesh
- District: Mainpuri
- Tehsil: Bhongaon

Area
  - Total: 1.401 km^{2} (0.541 sq mi)

Population (2011)
  - Total: 2,381
  - Density: 1,700/km^{2} (4,402/sq mi)
- Time zone: UTC+5:30 (IST)

Joga (Jogā) is a village in Bewar block of Mainpuri district, Uttar Pradesh, India. As of 2011, it had a population of 2,381, in 408 households.

== Demographics ==
As of 2011, Joga had a population of 2,381, in 408 households. This population was 54.7% male (1,302) and 45.3% female (1,079). The 0-6 age group numbered 318 (172 male and 146 female), or 13.4% of the total population. 884 residents were members of Scheduled Castes, or 37.1% of the total.

The 1981 census recorded Joga as having a population of 1,534 people, in 277 households.

The 1961 census recorded Joga as comprising 5 hamlets, with a total population of 1,221 people (666 male and 555 female), in 216 households and 166 physical houses. The area of the village was given as 302 acres.

== Infrastructure ==
As of 2011, Joga had 1 primary school; it did not have any healthcare facilities. Drinking water was provided by hand pump and tube well/borehole; there were no public toilets. The village had a post office but no public library; there was at least some access to electricity for all purposes. Streets were made of both kachcha and pakka materials.
