= Hindupur, Mainpuri =

Village in Uttar Pradesh, India

Hindupur
- Village
- Location in Uttar Pradesh, India
- Coordinates: 27.10001°N 79.37719°E
- Country: India
- State: Uttar Pradesh
- District: Mainpuri
- Tehsil: Bhongaon

Area
  - Total: 1.831 km^{2} (0.707 sq mi)

Population (2011)
  - Total: 1,775
  - Density: 969.4/km^{2} (2,511/sq mi)
- Time zone: UTC+5:30 (IST)
- PIN: 209720

Hindupur (Hindūpur) is a village in Bewar block of Mainpuri district, Uttar Pradesh, India. As of 2011, it had a population of 1,775, in 252 households.

== Demographics ==
As of 2011, Hindupur had a population of 1,775, in 252 households. This population was 51.9% male (921) and 48.1% female (854). The 0-6 age group numbered 301 (145 male and 156 female), or 17.0% of the total population. 139 residents were members of Scheduled Castes, or 7.8% of the total.

The 1961 census recorded Hindupur as comprising 5 hamlets, with a total population of 541 people (284 male and 257 female), in 144 households and 72 physical houses. The area of the village was given as 462 acres.

== Infrastructure ==
As of 2011, Hindupur had 1 primary school; it did not have any healthcare facilities. Drinking water was provided by hand pump and tube well/borehole; there were no public toilets. The village had a public library but no post office; there was at least some access to electricity for all purposes. Streets were made of both kachcha and pakka materials.
