= Kaua Tanda =

Village in Uttar Pradesh, India

- Village
- Location in Uttar Pradesh, India
- Coordinates: 27.20712°N 79.24878°E
- Country: India
- State: Uttar Pradesh
- District: Mainpuri
- Tehsil: Bhongaon

Area
  - Total: 2.67 km^{2} (1.03 sq mi)

Population (2011)
  - Total: 1,408
  - Density: 527/km^{2} (1,370/sq mi)
- Time zone: UTC+5:30 (IST)

Kaua Tanda (Kauā Ṭāṇḍā) is a village in Bewar block of Mainpuri district, Uttar Pradesh. As of 2011, it has a population of 1,408, in 230 households.

== Demographics ==
As of 2011, Kaua Tanda had a population of 1,408, in 230 households. This population was 53.1% male (747) and 46.9% female (661). The 0-6 age group numbered 185 (90 male and 95 female), or 13.1% of the total population. 397 residents were members of Scheduled Castes, or 28.2% of the total.

The 1981 census recorded Kaua Tanda population at 963 people, in 104 households.

The 1961 census recorded Kaua Tanda as comprising 3 hamlets, with a total population of 674 people (369 male and 305 female), in 143 households and 91 physical houses. The area of the village was given as 644 acres and it had a post office.

== Infrastructure ==
As of 2011, Kaua Tanda had 2 primary schools; it did not have any healthcare facilities. Drinking water was provided by well, hand pump, and tube well/borehole; there were no public toilets. The village had a sub post office but no public library; there was at least some access to electricity. Streets were made of both kachcha and pakka materials.
