= Bilpur Husainpur =

Village in Uttar Pradesh, India

- Village
- Location in Uttar Pradesh, India
- Coordinates: 27.17881°N 79.34801°E
- Country: India
- State: Uttar Pradesh
- District: Mainpuri
- Tehsil: Bhongaon

Area
  - Total: 0.827 km^{2} (0.319 sq mi)

Population (2011)
  - Total: 495
  - Density: 599/km^{2} (1,550/sq mi)
- Time zone: UTC+5:30 (IST)

Bilpur Husainpur (Bīlpur Husainpur) is a village in Bewar block of Mainpuri district, Uttar Pradesh. As of 2011, it had a population of 495, in 77 households.

== Demographics ==
As of 2011, Bilpur Husainpur had a population of 495, in 77 households. This population was 54.1% male (268) and 45.9% female (227). The 0-6 age group numbered 60 (32 male and 28 female), or 12.1% of the total population. No residents were members of Scheduled Castes.

The 1981 census recorded Bilpur Husainpur as having a population of 382 people, in 54 households.

The 1961 census recorded Bilpur Husainpur as comprising 2 hamlets, with a total population of 269 people (140 male and 129 female), in 42 households and 30 physical houses. The area of the village was given as 208 acres.

== Infrastructure ==
As of 2011, Bilpur Husainpur had 1 primary school; it did not have any healthcare facilities. Drinking water was provided by tap, hand pump, and tube well/borehole; there were no public toilets. The village had a post office but no public library; there was at least some access to electricity for all purposes. Streets were made of both kachcha and pakka materials.
