= Dikhatmai =

Village in Uttar Pradesh, India

- Village
- Location in Uttar Pradesh, India
- Coordinates: 27.18323°N 79.25156°E
- Country: India
- State: Uttar Pradesh
- District: Mainpuri
- Tehsil: Bhongaon

Area
  - Total: 1.057 km^{2} (0.408 sq mi)

Population (2011)
  - Total: 422
  - Density: 399/km^{2} (1,030/sq mi)
- Time zone: UTC+5:30 (IST)

Dikhatmai (Dikhatmaī) is a village in Bewar block of Mainpuri district, Uttar Pradesh, India. As of 2011, it had a population of 422, in 72 households.

== Demographics ==
As of 2011, Dikhatmai had a population of 422, in 72 households. This population was 42.2% male (178) and 57.8% female (244). The 0-6 age group numbered 32 (13 male and 19 female), or 7.6% of the total population. 247 residents were members of Scheduled Castes, or 58.5% of the total.

The 1981 census recorded Dikhatmai as having a population of 435 people, in 80 households.

The 1961 census recorded Dikhatmai as comprising 2 hamlets, with a total population of 355 people (184 male and 171 female), in 58 households and 46 physical houses. The area of the village was given as 260 acres.

== Infrastructure ==
As of 2011, Dikhatmai had 2 primary schools; it did not have any healthcare facilities. Drinking water was provided by hand pump and tube well/borehole; there were no public toilets. The village had a post office but no public library; there was at least some access to electricity for all purposes. Streets were made of both kachcha and pakka materials.
