= Raipur, Mainpuri =

Village in Uttar Pradesh, India

Raipur
- Village
- Location in Uttar Pradesh, India
- Coordinates: 27.18743°N 79.3077°E
- Country: India
- State: Uttar Pradesh
- District: Mainpuri
- Tehsil: Bhongaon

Area
  - Total: 2.844 km^{2} (1.098 sq mi)

Population (2011)
  - Total: 869
  - Density: 306/km^{2} (791/sq mi)
- Time zone: UTC+5:30 (IST)

Raipur (Rāypur) is a village in Bewar block of Mainpuri district, Uttar Pradesh. As of 2011, it had a population of 869, in 162 households.

== Demographics ==
As of 2011, Raipur had a population of 869, in 162 households. This population was 57.1% male (496) and 42.9% female (373). The 0-6 age group numbered 135 (76 male and 59 female), or 15.5% of the total population. 270 residents were members of Scheduled Castes, or 31.1% of the total.

The 1981 census recorded Raipur as having a population of 746 people, in 123 households.

The 1961 census recorded Raipur as comprising 4 hamlets, with a total population of 543 people (300 male and 243 female), in 113 households and 90 physical houses. The area of the village was given as 744 acres.

== Infrastructure ==
As of 2011, Raipur had 1 primary school; it did not have any healthcare facilities. Drinking water was provided by hand pump and tube well/borehole; there were no public toilets. The village had a post office but no public library; there was at least some access to electricity for all purposes. Streets were made of both kachcha and pakka materials.
