= Saidpur, Bewar =

Village in Uttar Pradesh, India

Saidpur
- Village
- Location in Uttar Pradesh, India
- Coordinates: 27.24595°N 79.26495°E
- Country: India
- State: Uttar Pradesh
- District: Mainpuri
- Tehsil: Bhongaon

Area
  - Total: 0.677 km^{2} (0.261 sq mi)

Population (2011)
  - Total: 812
  - Density: 1,200/km^{2} (3,110/sq mi)
- Time zone: UTC+5:30 (IST)

Saidpur (Saidpur) is a village in Bewar block of Mainpuri district, Uttar Pradesh, India. As of 2011, it had a population of 812, in 126 households.

== Demographics ==
As of 2011, Saidpur had a population of 812, in 126 households. This population was 59.5% male (402) and 50.5% female (410). The 0-6 age group numbered 151 (69 male and 82 female), or 18.6% of the total population. 446 residents were members of Scheduled Castes, or 54.9% of the total.

The 1981 census recorded Saidpur as having a population of 494 people, in 91 households.

The 1961 census recorded Saidpur as comprising 3 hamlets, with a total population of 353 people (193 male and 160 female), in 61 households and 51 physical houses. The area of the village was given as 155 acres.

== Infrastructure ==
As of 2011, Saidpur had 2 primary schools; it did not have any healthcare facilities. Drinking water was provided by hand pump and tube well/borehole; there was at least one public toilet. The village had a post office but no public library; there was at least some access to electricity for all purposes. Streets were made of pakka materials.
