= Gangarwala =

Village in Uttar Pradesh, India

- Village
- Location in Uttar Pradesh, India
- Coordinates: 27.19251°N 79.26206°E
- Country: India
- State: Uttar Pradesh
- District: Mainpuri
- Tehsil: Bhongaon

Area
  - Total: 5.446 km^{2} (2.103 sq mi)

Population (2011)
  - Total: 3,084
  - Density: 566.3/km^{2} (1,467/sq mi)
- Time zone: UTC+5:30 (IST)

Gangarwala (Gaṅgarwālā) is a village in Bewar block of Mainpuri district, Uttar Pradesh. As of 2011, it has a population of 3,084, in 564 households.

== Demographics ==
As of 2011, Gangarwala had a population of 3,084, in 564 households. This population was 50.6% male (1,561) and 49.4% female (1,523). The 0-6 age group numbered 457 (249 male and 208 female), or 14.8% of the total population. 762 residents were members of Scheduled Castes, or 24.7% of the total.

The 1981 census recorded Gangarwala as having a population of 2,032 people, in 336 households.

The 1961 census recorded Gangarwala as comprising 6 hamlets, with a total population of 1,434 people (788 male and 646 female), in 243 households and 99 physical houses. The area of the village was given as 1,349 acres.

== Infrastructure ==
As of 2011, Gangarwala had 1 school teaching at the primary level and 3 teaching at the middle school level; it did not have any healthcare facilities. Drinking water was provided by hand pump and tube well/borehole; there were no public toilets. The village had a post office but no public library; there was at least some access to electricity for all purposes. Streets were made of both kachcha and pakka materials.
