= Chanepur =

Village in Uttar Pradesh, India

- Village
- Location in Uttar Pradesh, India
- Coordinates: 27.20875°N 79.36018°E
- Country: India
- State: Uttar Pradesh
- District: Mainpuri
- Tehsil: Bhongaon

Area
  - Total: 1.228 km^{2} (0.474 sq mi)

Population (2011)
  - Total: 373
  - Density: 304/km^{2} (787/sq mi)
- Time zone: UTC+5:30 (IST)

Chanepur (Chanepur) is a village in Bewar block of Mainpuri district, Uttar Pradesh. As of 2011, it has a population of 373, in 64 households.

== Demographics ==
As of 2011, Chanepur had a population of 373, in 64 households. This population was 55.8% male (208) and 44.2% female (165). The 0-6 age group numbered 75 (38 male and 37 female), or 20.1% of the total population. 129 residents were members of Scheduled Castes, or 34.6% of the total.

The 1981 census recorded Chanepur as having a population of 199 people, in 35 households.

The 1961 census recorded Chanepur as comprising 1 hamlet, with a total population of 140 people (65 male and 75 female), in 25 households and 17 physical houses. The area of the village was given as 247 acres.

== Infrastructure ==
As of 2011, Chanepur did not have any schools or healthcare facilities. Drinking water was provided by hand pump and tube well/borehole; there was at least one public toilet. The village had a post office but no public library; there was at least some access to electricity for commercial and agricultural (but not residential) purposes. Streets were made of kachcha materials.
