= Dharmangadpur =

Village in Uttar Pradesh, India

- Village
- Location in Uttar Pradesh, India
- Coordinates: 27.12464°N 79.28106°E
- Country: India
- State: Uttar Pradesh
- District: Mainpuri
- Tehsil: Bhongaon

Area
  - Total: 1.484 km^{2} (0.573 sq mi)

Population (2011)
  - Total: 722
  - Density: 487/km^{2} (1,260/sq mi)
- Time zone: UTC+5:30 (IST)

Dharmangadpur (Dharmaṅgadpur) is a village in Bewar block of Mainpuri district, Uttar Pradesh, India. As of 2011, it had a population of 722, in 118 households.

== Demographics ==
As of 2011, Dharmangadpur had a population of 722, in 118 households. This population was 52.8% male (381) and 47.2% female (341). The 0-6 age group numbered 89 (51 male and 38 female), or 12.3% of the total population. 105 residents were members of Scheduled Castes, or 14.5% of the total.

The 1981 census recorded Dharmangadpur as having a population of 569 people, in 81 households.

The 1961 census recorded Dharmangadpur as comprising 3 hamlets, with a total population of 522 people (281 male and 241 female), in 72 households and 66 physical houses. The area of the village was given as 414 acres.

== Infrastructure ==
As of 2011, Dharmangadpur had 1 primary school; it did not have any healthcare facilities. Drinking water was provided by hand pump and tube well/borehole; there were no public toilets. The village had a public library but no post office; there was at least some access to electricity for all purposes. Streets were made of kachcha materials.
