= Nandulia =

Village in Uttar Pradesh, India

- Village
- Location in Uttar Pradesh, India
- Coordinates: 27.10765°N 79.3744°E
- Country: India
- State: Uttar Pradesh
- District: Mainpuri
- Tehsil: Bhongaon

Area
  - Total: 1.426 km^{2} (0.551 sq mi)

Population (2011)
  - Total: 862
  - Density: 604/km^{2} (1,570/sq mi)
- Time zone: UTC+5:30 (IST)
- PIN: 209720

Nandulia (Nanduliyā) is a village in Bewar block of Mainpuri district, Uttar Pradesh, India. As of 2011, it has a population of 862, in 126 households.

== Demographics ==
As of 2011, Nandulia had a population of 862, in 126 households. This population was 50.3% male (434) and 49.7% female (428). The 0-6 age group numbered 177 (105 male and 72 female), or 20.5% of the total population. 162 residents were members of Scheduled Castes, or 18.8% of the total.

The 1981 census recorded Nandulia as having a population of 491 people, in 94 households.

The 1961 census recorded Nandulia as comprising 3 hamlets, with a total population of 357 people (208 male and 154 female), in 68 households and 55 physical houses. The area of the village was given as 351 acres.

== Infrastructure ==
As of 2011, Nandulia had 2 primary schools; it did not have any healthcare facilities. Drinking water was provided by hand pump and tube well/borehole; there were no public toilets. The village had a public library but no post office; there was at least some access to electricity for all purposes. Streets were made of both kachcha and pakka materials.
