= Manpur Hari =

Village in Uttar Pradesh, India

- Village
- Location in Uttar Pradesh, India
- Coordinates: 27.25524°N 79.26178°E
- Country: India
- State: Uttar Pradesh
- District: Mainpuri
- Tehsil: Bhongaon

Area
  - Total: 1.697 km^{2} (0.655 sq mi)

Population (2011)
  - Total: 1,693
  - Density: 997.6/km^{2} (2,584/sq mi)
- Time zone: UTC+5:30 (IST)

Manpur Hari (Mānpur Harī) is a village in Bewar block of Mainpuri district, Uttar Pradesh. As of 2011, it has a population of 1,693, in 296 households.

== Geography ==
Manpur Hari is located by the Bewar branch canal, and there is a bridge over the canal at Manpur Hari.

== Demographics ==
As of 2011, Manpur Hari had a population of 1,693, in 296 households. This population was 51.3% male (868) and 48.7% female (825). The 0-6 age group numbered 254 (130 male and 124 female), or 15.0% of the total population. 316 residents were members of Scheduled Castes, or 18.7% of the total.

The 1981 census recorded Manpur Hari as having a population of 1,066 people, in 202 households.

The 1961 census recorded Manpur Hari as comprising 4 hamlets, with a total population of 832 people (449 male and 383 female), in 178 households and 142 physical houses. The area of the village was given as 445 acres.

== Infrastructure ==
As of 2011, Manpur Hari had 2 primary schools and 1 primary health centre. Drinking water was provided by hand pump and tube well/borehole; there were no public toilets. The village had a sub post office but no public library; there was at least some access to electricity for all purposes. Streets were made of pakka materials.
