= Husainpur, Bewar =

Village in Uttar Pradesh, India

Husainpur
- Village
- Location in Uttar Pradesh, India
- Coordinates: 27.17783°N 79.33214°E
- Country: India
- State: Uttar Pradesh
- District: Mainpuri
- Tehsil: Bhongaon

Area
  - Total: 1.772 km^{2} (0.684 sq mi)

Population (2011)
  - Total: 1,477
  - Density: 833.5/km^{2} (2,159/sq mi)
- Time zone: UTC+5:30 (IST)

Husainpur is a village in Bewar block of Mainpuri district, Uttar Pradesh. As of 2011, it had a population of 1,477, in 240 households.

== Demographics ==
As of 2011, Husainpur had a population of 1,477, in 240 households. This population was 55.0% male (813) and 45.0% female (664). The 0-6 age group numbered 195 (112 male and 83 female), or 13.2% of the total population. 306 residents were members of Scheduled Castes, or 20.7% of the total.

The 1981 census recorded Husainpur as having a population of 910 people, in 160 households.

The 1961 census recorded Husainpur as comprising 2 hamlets, with a total population of 747 people (411 male and 336 female), in 138 households and 93 physical houses. The area of the village was given as 443 acres.

== Infrastructure ==
As of 2011, Husainpur had 1 primary school; it did not have any healthcare facilities. Drinking water was provided by tap, hand pump, and tube well/borehole; there were no public toilets. The village had a post office but no public library; there was at least some access to electricity for all purposes. Streets were made of both kachcha and pakka materials.
