= Jasmai =

Village in Uttar Pradesh, India

- Village
- Location in Uttar Pradesh, India
- Coordinates: 27.11505°N 79.36083°E
- Country: India
- State: Uttar Pradesh
- District: Mainpuri
- Tehsil: Bhongaon

Area
  - Total: 6.721 km^{2} (2.595 sq mi)

Population (2011)
  - Total: 4,261
  - Density: 634.0/km^{2} (1,642/sq mi)
- Time zone: UTC+5:30 (IST)
- PIN: 209720

Jasmai (Jasmaī) is a village in Bewar block of Mainpuri district, Uttar Pradesh, India. As of 2011, it had a population of 4,261, in 679 households.

== Demographics ==
As of 2011, Jasmai had a population of 4,261, in 679 households. This population was 51.5% male (2,193) and 48.5% female (2,068). The 0-6 age group numbered 570 (308 male and 262 female), or 13.4% of the total population. 431 residents were members of Scheduled Castes, or 10.1% of the total.

The 1981 census recorded Jasmai as having a population of 2,812 people, in 483 households.

The 1961 census recorded Jasmai as comprising 13 hamlets, with a total population of 2,014 people (1,094 male and 920 female), in 398 households and 198 physical houses. The area of the village was given as 1,122 acres.

== Infrastructure ==
As of 2011, Jasmai had 1 primary school; it did not have any healthcare facilities. Drinking water was provided by hand pump and tube well/borehole; there were no public toilets. The village had a post office but no public library; there was at least some access to electricity for all purposes. Streets were made of both kachcha and pakka materials.
