= Nunari =

Village in Uttar Pradesh, India

- Village
- Location in Uttar Pradesh, India
- Coordinates: 27.12416°N 79.26918°E
- Country: India
- State: Uttar Pradesh
- District: Mainpuri
- Tehsil: Bhongaon

Area
  - Total: 3.117 km^{2} (1.203 sq mi)

Population (2011)
  - Total: 2,275
  - Density: 729.9/km^{2} (1,890/sq mi)
- Time zone: UTC+5:30 (IST)

Nunari (Nūnārī) is a village in Bewar block of Mainpuri district, Uttar Pradesh, India. As of 2011, it had a population of 2,275, in 372 households.

== Demographics ==
As of 2011, Nunari had a population of 2,275, in 372 households. This population was 51.9% male (1,180) and 48.1% female (1,095). The 0-6 age group numbered 342 (168 male and 174 female), or 15.0% of the total population. 306 residents were members of Scheduled Castes, or 13.5% of the total.

The 1981 census recorded Nunari as having a population of 1,644 people, in 271 households.

The 1961 census recorded Nunari as comprising 4 hamlets, with a total population of 1,090 people (611 male and 479 female), in 191 households and 121 physical houses. The area of the village was given as 655 acres.

== Infrastructure ==
As of 2011, Nunari had 1 primary school; it did not have any healthcare facilities. Drinking water was provided by tap, hand pump, and tube well/borehole; there were no public toilets. The village had a post office and public library, as well as at least some access to electricity for all purposes. Streets were made of both kachcha and pakka materials.
