= Nabiganj, Mainpuri =

Village in Uttar Pradesh, India

Nabiganj
- Village
- Location in Uttar Pradesh, India
- Coordinates: 27.19233°N 79.38633°E
- Country: India
- State: Uttar Pradesh
- District: Mainpuri
- Tehsil: Bhongaon

Area
  - Total: 3.049 km^{2} (1.177 sq mi)

Population (2011)
  - Total: 4,883
  - Density: 1,602/km^{2} (4,148/sq mi)
- Time zone: UTC+5:30 (IST)

Nabiganj (Nabīgañj) is a village in Bewar block of Mainpuri district, Uttar Pradesh, India. Located on a historically important trade route, Nabiganj used to serve as a way station for travelling merchants; it was also the seat of a pargana. As of 2011, Nabiganj had a population of 4,883, in 792 households.

== Geography ==
Nabiganj is located about 23 km east of Bhongaon, on a historical branch of the Grand Trunk Road.

== History ==
Because of its location on an important east–west trade route, Nabiganj historically served as a way station for travelling merchants. A roadside sarai built by Khan Bahadur Khan, who ruled at Karimganj in the mid-1700s, offered lodging to travellers into the early 20th century. At one point, Nabiganj was the seat of a pargana; it was later merged under Kishni. In the early 1800s, the local zamindars were Bais Rajputs; in 1840, they sold the village to a group of Chauhans from Bhadai, Chirawar, and Arjunpur.

== Demographics ==
As of 2011, Nabiganj had a population of 4,883, in 792 households. This population was 53.3% male (2,602) and 46.7% female (2,281). The 0-6 age group numbered 847 (448 male and 399 female), or 17.3% of the total population. 1,207 residents were members of Scheduled Castes, or 24.7% of the total.

The 1981 census recorded Nabiganj as having a population of 2,372 people, in 415 households.

The 1961 census recorded Nabiganj as comprising 1 hamlet, with a total population of 1,626 people (860 male and 766 female), in 390 households and 292 physical houses. The area of the village was given as 779 acres and it had a post office at that point.

As of 1901, Nabiganj had a population of 1,065, in 1 hamlet; it was noted to be one of the two largest villages in pargana Kishni (the other was Kishni itself).

== Infrastructure ==
As of 2011, Nabiganj had 2 primary schools and 1 primary health centre. Drinking water was provided by hand pump; there were no public toilets. The village had a post office but no public library; there was at least some access to electricity for all purposes. Streets were made of both kachcha and pakka materials.
