= Aryapur Khera, Mainpuri =

Aryapur Khera, Mainpuri Alipur Khera
- village
- Location in Uttar Pradesh, India Aryapur Khera, Mainpuri (India)
- Coordinates: 27.23°N 79.02°E
- Country: India
- State: Uttar Pradesh
- District: Mainpuri

Languages
  - Official: Hindi
- Time zone: UTC+5:30 (IST)
- PIN: 205262
- Telephone code: 05673
- Vehicle registration: UP-84
- Website: www.mainpuri.nic.in

Aryapur Khera is the village. Mainpuri city is an administrative headquarters of this village. Mainpuri is located to the north-east of Agra.

== History ==
Aryapur Khera got its name due to his geographical location. The village is established since 16th–17th century. It was a business zone. Main business areas are Tambaqo (agricultural products), jewellery, potato, wheat, and rice.

== Places of interest ==
The village has some old and popular Hindu temples, Mosque and Jain Temple.

=== Markets ===
Bakari ka bajar : It is located in main market.

Sunaar Gali : It is famous jewelry market.

Galla mandi : Village holds 2 major galla mandi.

Cloth Destination : This village attract several people for cloth destination. This is right destination for cloth purchase.

Village holds famous temples:

- Mahadevo Mandir (Lord Shiva's Temple), It is near to bypass.
- Devi Mandir (Durga's Temple), It is in front on Mahadevo mandir OR near to bypass.
- Kali Mandir, It is located at bypass, near Shivapalpur village.
- Shri Narmadeshwar Mahadev Mandir, It is located at tempo station, near to Alipur Patti.

=== Mainpuri district ===
Mainpuri is also known for sarus crane (Grus antigone). The sarus crane is the only crane species that resides and breeds in India. It is the world's tallest flying bird. There are three subspecies of sarus crane known worldwide. This bird, called krouncha in India, is revered as a symbol of marital fidelity and is celebrated in myth and legend. There are estimated to be 8,000–10,000 sarus cranes in India. Two third of its population resides in Karhal.

== Post office details ==
The post offices are :

- Office Name: Alipur Khera B.O
- Pincode: 205262
- Status: Branch Office (Delivery) directly a/w Head Office
- Head Office: Mainpuri H.O
- Location: Bhongaon Tahasil of Mainpuri District
- SPCC: Mainpuri-205001
- Postal Department Information: Mainpuri Division Agra Region Uttar Pradesh Circle

== Education ==
=== The educational institutions are ===
- Gyanodaya public school, near Jain mandir, Aryapur Khera.

Q.S.M Public School,Mainpuri market, Aryapur khera

- Gyan Gaurav Academy, near to bypass, Aryapur Khera

BSD INTER COLLEGE, Alipur Patti

- Indian Public School, near to Manikpur, Aryapur Khera
- Lok kalyan inter college and lok kalyan ashram, Aryapur Khera.

=== Colleges and degree colleges ===
- D.A.V. Inter College, Aryapur khera
- Lok kalyan inter college, Aryapur khera
- Bansidhar sarda devi maha vidhyalaya, Aryapur khera

== NGOs ==
1. Lok Kalyan Ashram, Aryapur Khera, Mainpuri.
2. Neelkamal Educational and Welfare Society, Aryapur Khera
3. R.Dayal bricks store and social welfare (Alipur khera)
4. Lotus worldwide Research Foundation Alipur Patti , Mainpuri U.P.

== Geography ==
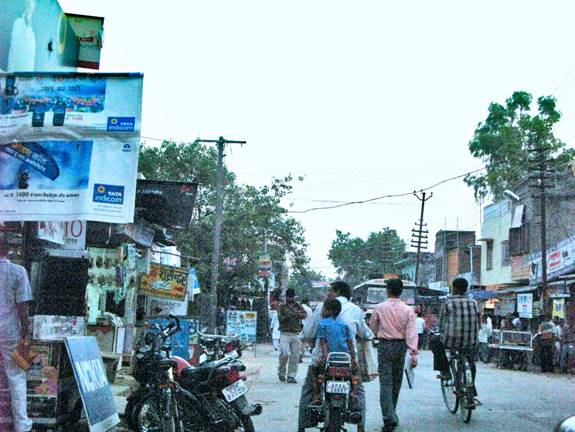
A street in Mainpuri town

Mainpuri is located at 27.23°N 79.02°E. It has an average elevation of 153 metres (501 ft).

== Demographics ==
As of 2001 India census, Mainpuri had a population of 89,535. Males constitute 53% of the population and females 47%. Mainpuri has an average literacy rate of 69%, higher than the national average of 59.5%: male literacy is 74%, and female literacy is 64%. In Mainpuri, 15% of the population is under 6 years of age. People speak Kannauji in day-to-day communication.

Some popular markets include Laneganj, Devi Road, Old Tehsil Road, Agra Road etc. known for Agro Commodities, handicrafts etc. Mainpuri today has population of over 1 Lakh in city and over 15 Lakhs as District.
