= Gadaipur =

- Village
- Location in Haryana, India Gadaipur (India)
- Country: India
- State: Haryana
- Region: North India
- District: Gurgaon

Population (2011)
  - Total: 1,365

Languages
  - Official: Hindi
- Time zone: UTC+5:30 (IST)
- PIN: 122003
- ISO 3166 code: IN-HR
- Vehicle registration: HR-26,72
- Website: haryana.gov.in

Gadaipur is a village in Pataudi Mandal in Gurgaon District, Haryana, India. The village is 7.341 kilometres (4.561 mi) from the mandal's main town of Pataudi, 35.62 kilometres (22.13 mi) from the district's main city, Gurgaon and 273 kilometres (170 mi) from the state capital, Chandigarh.

Quni Daultabad is a nearby village. Shri Rakesh Thakran is the present sarpanch of the village. Shri Omkar Thakran(Indian Airforce) and Shri Jhabar Sing Thakran(Indian Army) are notable person from the village.

== Nearby schools ==
- Ashram Hari Mandir Sanskrit Vidyalaya
- MD Senior Secondary School
- Keshav Senior Secondary School
- New Happy Child Senior Secondary School
