= Shivsinghpur =

Village in Uttar Pradesh, India

- Village
- Location in Uttar Pradesh, India
- Coordinates: 27.25823°N 79.03079°E
- Country: India
- State: Uttar Pradesh
- District: Mainpuri
- Tehsil: Mainpuri

Area
  - Total: 1.573 km^{2} (0.607 sq mi)

Population (2011)
  - Total: 822
  - Density: 523/km^{2} (1,350/sq mi)
- Time zone: UTC+5:30 (IST)
- PIN: 205001

Shivsinghpur (Shivsiṅghpur) is a village in Mainpuri block of Mainpuri district, Uttar Pradesh, India. As of 2011, it had a population of 822, in 148 households.

== Demographics ==
As of 2011, Shivsinghpur had a population of 822, in 148 households. This population was 52.4% male (431) and 47.6% female (391). The 0-6 age group numbered 130 (70 male and 60 female), or 15.8% of the total population. 509 residents were members of Scheduled Castes, or 61.9% of the total.

The 1981 census recorded Shivsinghpur as having a population of 375 people, in 75 households.

The 1961 census recorded Shivsinghpur as comprising 2 hamlets, with a total population of 266 people (152 male and 114 female), in 45 households and 43 physical houses. The area of the village was given as 389 acres.

== Infrastructure ==
As of 2011, Shivsinghpur had 1 primary school; it did not have any healthcare facilities. Drinking water was provided by hand pump and tube well; there were no public toilets. The village did not have a post office or public library; there was at least some access to electricity for all purposes. Streets were made of both kachcha and pakka materials.
