= Gangsi, India =

Village in Uttar Pradesh, India

Gangsi
- Village
- Location in Uttar Pradesh, India
- Coordinates: 27.13303°N 78.92587°E
- Country: India
- State: Uttar Pradesh
- District: Mainpuri
- Tehsil: Mainpuri

Area
  - Total: 12.297 km^{2} (4.748 sq mi)

Population (2011)
  - Total: 5,354
  - Density: 435.4/km^{2} (1,128/sq mi)
- Time zone: UTC+5:30 (IST)
- PIN: 205119

Gangsi (Gaṅgsī) is a village in Mainpuri block of Mainpuri district, Uttar Pradesh, India. As of 2011, it had a population of 5,354, in 934 households.

== Geography ==
Gangsi is located on the Etawah branch of the Lower Ganga Canal, at a point where it bends to the south. The Gangsi Drain, a left-side distributary of the main canal, branches off here. There is also a canal fall on the main canal at Gangsi, as well as a bridge crossing the canal.

== Demographics ==
As of 2011, Gangsi had a population of 5,354, in 934 households. This population was 54.7% male (2,929) and 45.3% female (2,425). The 0-6 age group numbered 739 (383 male and 356 female), or 13.9% of the total population. 1,113 residents were members of Scheduled Castes, or 20.8% of the total.

The 1981 census recorded Gangsi as having a population of 3,340 people, in 593 households.

The 1961 census recorded Gangsi (as "Gangari") as comprising 11 hamlets, with a total population of 2,201 people (1,171 male and 1,030 female), in 407 households and 346 physical houses. The area of the village was given as 2,961 acres.

== Infrastructure ==
As of 2011, Gangsi had 2 primary schools; it did not have any healthcare facilities. Drinking water was provided by hand pump and tube well; there were no public toilets. The village had a post office but no public library; there was at least some access to electricity for all purposes. Streets were made of both kachcha and pakka materials.
