= Dharmangadpur Nagariya =

Village in Uttar Pradesh, India

- Village
- Location in Uttar Pradesh, India
- Coordinates: 27.19724°N 78.92839°E
- Country: India
- State: Uttar Pradesh
- District: Mainpuri
- Tehsil: Mainpuri

Area
  - Total: 2.123 km^{2} (0.820 sq mi)

Population (2011)
  - Total: 1,624
  - Density: 765.0/km^{2} (1,981/sq mi)
- Time zone: UTC+5:30 (IST)

Dharmangadpur Nagariya (Dharmaṅgadpur Nagariyā) is a village in Mainpuri block of Mainpuri district, Uttar Pradesh, India. It is located on the Kanpur branch of the Lower Ganga Canal. As of 2011, Dharmangadpur Nagariya had a population of 1,624, in 261 households.

== Geography ==
Dharmangadpur Nagariya is located on the Kanpur branch of the Lower Ganga Canal, and a bridge crosses the canal at the subsidiary hamlet of Rustampur. There is also a prominent jhil on village lands.

== Demographics ==
As of 2011, Dharmangadpur Nagariya had a population of 1,624, in 261 households. This population was 53.2% male (864) and 46.8% female (760). The 0-6 age group numbered 272 (145 male and 127 female), or 16.7% of the total population. 266 residents were members of Scheduled Castes, or 16.4% of the total.

The 1981 census recorded Dharmangadpur Nagariya (as "Dharmadpur Nagniya") as having a population of 1,060 people, in 180 households.

The 1961 census recorded Dharmangadpur Nagariya as comprising 4 hamlets, with a total population of 758 people (411 male and 347 female), in 133 households and 85 physical houses. The area of the village was given as 570 acres.

== Infrastructure ==
As of 2011, Dharmangadpur Nagariya had 1 primary school; it did not have any healthcare facilities. Drinking water was provided by hand pump and tube well; there were no public toilets. The village had a public library but no post office; there was at least some access to electricity for all purposes. Streets were made of kachcha materials.
