= Allau =

Village in Uttar Pradesh, India

- Village
- Location in Uttar Pradesh, India
- Coordinates: 27.1895799°N 79.1247555°E
- Country: India
- State: Uttar Pradesh
- District: Mainpuri
- Tehsil: Bhongaon

Area
  - Total: 6.479 km^{2} (2.502 sq mi)

Population (2011)
  - Total: 5,087
  - Density: 785.2/km^{2} (2,034/sq mi)
- Time zone: UTC+5:30 (IST)

Allau (Allāū), also spelled Ailau, is a village in Jagir block of Mainpuri district, Uttar Pradesh. Located south of Bhongaon and east of Mainpuri, Allau is a former community development block headquarters. It contains about a dozen subsidiary hamlets. As of 2011, Allau had a total population of 5,087, in 1,810 households.

== Geography ==
Allau is located about 10 km south of Bhongaon, the tehsil headquarters, and 13 km east of Mainpuri. The Nagaria distributary canal crosses through village lands immediately north of the main site.

According to the 2011 census, Allau has a total area of 1,605.7 hectares, of which 382.2 were currently farmland, 165.1 were fallow lands, and 91.1 were under non-agricultural use. 4.1 hectares were occupied by orchards, 0 were occupied by permanent pastures, 6.3 were classified as cultivable but not currently under any agricultural use, and 0 were classified as non-cultivable. No forests existed on village lands.

== History ==
At the turn of the 20th century, Allau was described as containing "the village site of mauza Gadaipur... and there are twelve subsidiary hamlets". The Raja of Mainpuri was then the sole zamindar of Allau.

== Demographics ==
As of 2011, Allau had a population of 5,087, in 1,810 households. This population was 54.1% male (2,756) and 45.9% female (2,331). The 0-6 age group numbered 798 (449 male and 349 female), or 15.7% of the total population. 1,249 residents were members of Scheduled Castes, or 24.6% of the total.

The 1981 census recorded Allau as having a population of 3,271 people, in 590 households.

The 1961 census recorded Allau as comprising 15 hamlets, with a total population of 2,453 people (1,310 male and 1,143 female), in 497 households and 245 physical houses. The area of the village was given as 1,586 acres, and it was then headquarters of a community development block.

As of 1901, Allau had a total population of 2,080.

== Infrastructure ==
As of 2011, Allau had 3 primary schools; it did not have any healthcare facilities. Drinking water was provided by hand pump and tube well; there were no public toilets. The village had a post office but no public library; there was at least some access to electricity for all purposes. Streets were made of both kachcha and pakka materials.
