= Bhogaon =

- Town
- Location in Uttar Pradesh, India Bhogaon (India)
- Coordinates: 27°15′0″N 79°11′0″E
- Country: India
- State: Uttar Pradesh
- District: Mainpuri

Government
  - MLA: Ramnaresh Agnihotri
- Elevation: 152 m (499 ft)

Population (2001)
  - Total: 26,799

Languages
  - Official: Hindi
- Time zone: UTC+5:30 (IST)
- PIN: 205262
- Vehicle registration: UP
- Coastline: 0 kilometres (0 mi)
- Website: up.gov.in

Bhogaon or Bhongaon is a town and a nagar panchayat in Mainpuri district in the state of Uttar Pradesh, India. The Grand Trunk Road passes through Bhogaon and National Highway 92 originates from here.

== Demographics ==
As of 2001 India census, Bhogaon had a population of 26,799. Males constitute 53% of the population and females 47%. Bhogaon has an average literacy rate of 55%, lower than the national average of 59.5%; with male literacy of 61% and female literacy of 47%. 17% of the population is under 6 years of age.

== Geography ==
It is located at 27°15′0″N 79°11′0″E at an elevation of 152 m from MSL.

== Villages in Bhogaon tehsil ==
- Aryapur Khera
- Chhachha
