= Patara =

Patara may refer to the following places and jurisdictions:

== Artsakh ==
- Patara, Nagorno-Karabakh, a village in the Askeran Province of the Republic of Artsakh

== Asian Turkey ==
- Patara (Cappadocia), an ancient city in Turkey
- Patara (Lycia), an ancient city and former bishopric, now a Latin Catholic titular see

== India ==
- Patara, Jalandhar, a village in Punjab
- Patara, Kanpur, a village in Uttar Pradesh
- Patara, Mainpuri, a village in Uttar Pradesh
