= Mnaseas =

Mnaseas of Patrae (Ancient Greek: Μνασέας ὁ Πατρεύς) or of Patara, whether that in Lycia or perhaps the Patara in Cappadocia was a Greek historian of the late 3rd century BCE, who is reckoned to have been a pupil in Alexandria of Eratosthenes. His Periegesis or Periplus described Europe, Western Asia and North Africa, but whether in six or eight books cannot now be determined. His On Oracles appears to have consisted of a catalogue of oracular responses with commentary. Only fragments of his work survive, some found in fragmentary papyri at Oxyrhynchus, others embedded as scholia or as quotations in other works, often selected, apparently, because of the unusual interpretations they offer.

A modern edition of the fragments is P. Cappelletto, 2003. I frammenti di Mnasea: introduzione testo e commento.
