= Birsinghpur (disambiguation) =

Birsinghpur is a sub district of Satna District in Madhya Pradesh, India.

Birsinghpur may also refer to:

- Birsinghpur railway station, on the Bilaspur–Katni line, Madhya Pradesh
- Birsinghpur, Karhal, a village in Mainpuri district, Uttar Pradesh
- Birsinghpur, Kuraoli, a village in Mainpuri district, Uttar Pradesh
- Birsinghpur, Sultanganj, a village in Mainpuri district, Uttar Pradesh
