= Amama =

Amama may refer to:

- Amama Mbabazi, Ugandan lawyer and politician, former prime minister (2011-2014)
- Sixtinus Amama, Dutch theologian
- Amama (album), a 2024 album by Crumb
- Amama (river), river in Ghana

== See also ==
- Ammama, Islamic headwear
- Amamai, a village in Uttar Pradesh, India
- Ammamma, an ancient Hittite goddess
- Ammamma.com, a 2007 Indian Telugu-language television series
- Ammamma Garillu, a 2018 Indian Telugu-language film
