= Manauna, Karhal =

Village in Uttar Pradesh, India

Manauna
- Village
- Location in Uttar Pradesh, India
- Coordinates: 26.99087°N 78.84977°E
- Country: India
- State: Uttar Pradesh
- District: Mainpuri
- Tehsil: Karhal

Area
  - Total: 2.908 km^{2} (1.123 sq mi)

Population (2011)
  - Total: 1,904
  - Density: 654.7/km^{2} (1,696/sq mi)
- Time zone: UTC+5:30 (IST)

Manauna (Manaunā) is a village in Karhal block of Mainpuri district, Uttar Pradesh. As of 2011, it has a population of 1,904, in 322 households.

== Demographics ==
As of 2011, Manauna had a population of 1,904, in 322 households. This population was 53.2% male (1,012) and 46.8% female (892). The 0-6 age group numbered 344 (191 male and 153 female), or 18.1% of the total population. 527 residents were members of Scheduled Castes, or 27.7% of the total.

The 1981 census recorded Manauna as having a population of 1,213 people, in 205 households.

The 1961 census recorded Manauna as comprising 2 hamlets, with a total population of 915 people (454 male and 461 female), in 162 households and 129 physical houses. The area of the village was given as 734 acres.

== Infrastructure ==
As of 2011, Manauna had 1 primary school; it did not have any healthcare facilities. Drinking water was provided by hand pump; there were no public toilets. The village had a public library but no post office; there was at least some access to electricity for all purposes. Streets were made of both kachcha and pakka materials.
