= Asrohi =

Village in Uttar Pradesh, India

- Village
- Location in Uttar Pradesh, India
- Coordinates: 27.00629°N 78.8706°E
- Country: India
- State: Uttar Pradesh
- District: Mainpuri
- Tehsil: Karhal

Area
  - Total: 2.962 km^{2} (1.144 sq mi)

Population (2011)
  - Total: 2,072
  - Density: 699.5/km^{2} (1,812/sq mi)
- Time zone: UTC+5:30 (IST)

Asrohi (Asrohī) is a village in Karhal block of Mainpuri district, Uttar Pradesh, India. As of 2011, it has a population of 2,072, in 334 households.

== Demographics ==
As of 2011, Asrohi had a population of 2,072, in 334 households. This population was 53.1% male (1,100) and 46.9% female (972). The 0-6 age group numbered 330 (172 male and 158 female), or 15.9% of the total population. 797 residents were members of Scheduled Castes, or 38.5% of the total.

The 1981 census recorded Asrohi as having a population of 1,125 people, in 188 households.

The 1961 census recorded Asrohi as comprising 4 hamlets, with a total population of 717 people (381 male and 336 female), in 131 households and 82 physical houses. The area of the village was given as 728 acres.

== Infrastructure ==
As of 2011, Asrohi had 2 primary schools; it did not have any healthcare facilities. Drinking water was provided by hand pump and tube well; there were no public toilets. The village had a post office and public library, as well as at least some access to electricity for all purposes. Streets were made of both kachcha and pakka materials.
