= Sahas =

Village in Uttar Pradesh, India

- Village
- Location in Uttar Pradesh, India
- Coordinates: 27.09162°N 78.98094°E
- Country: India
- State: Uttar Pradesh
- District: Mainpuri
- Tehsil: Karhal

Area
  - Total: 3.058 km^{2} (1.181 sq mi)

Population (2011)
  - Total: 1,183
  - Density: 386.9/km^{2} (1,002/sq mi)
- Time zone: UTC+5:30 (IST)

Sahas is a village in Karhal block of Mainpuri district, Uttar Pradesh, India. As of 2011, it had a population of 1,183, in 199 households.

== Demographics ==
As of 2011, Sahas had a population of 1,183, in 199 households. This population was 54.2% male (641) and 45.8% female (542). The 0-6 age group numbered 202 (109 male and 93 female), or 17.1% of the total population. 231 residents were members of Scheduled Castes, or 19.5% of the total.

The 1961 census recorded Sahas as comprising 3 hamlets, with a total population of 466 people (243 male and 223 female), in 85 households and 74 physical houses. The area of the village was given as 755 acres.

== Infrastructure ==
As of 2011, Sahas had 4 primary schools; it did not have any kind of healthcare facility. Drinking water was provided by well, hand pump, and tube well; there were no public toilets. The village had a public library but no post office; there was at least some access to electricity for all purposes. Streets were made of both kachcha and pakka materials.
