= Gamhira =

Village in Uttar Pradesh, India

- Village
- Location in Uttar Pradesh, India
- Coordinates: 27.01881°N 78.97127°E
- Country: India
- State: Uttar Pradesh
- District: Mainpuri
- Tehsil: Karhal

Area
  - Total: 2.386 km^{2} (0.921 sq mi)

Population (2011)
  - Total: 1,250
  - Density: 524/km^{2} (1,360/sq mi)
- Time zone: UTC+5:30 (IST)
- PIN: 205264

Gamhira (Gamhirā), also spelled Gambhira (Gamhīrā), is a village in Karhal block of Mainpuri district, Uttar Pradesh. As of 2011, it has a population of 1,250, in 214 households.

== Geography ==
There is a prominent jhil at Gamhira.

== Demographics ==
As of 2011, Gamhira had a population of 1,250, in 214 households. This population was 52.1% male (651) and 47.9% female (599). The 0-6 age group numbered 202 (113 male and 89 female), or 16.2% of the total population. 283 residents were members of Scheduled Castes, or 22.6% of the total. Kirana Store in Gamhira - Panchi Retail Bazaar Gamhira famous kirana Store in Gamhira

The 1961 census recorded Gamhira (as "Gambhira") as comprising 3 hamlets, with a total population of 568 people (311 male and 257 female), in 94 households and 86 physical houses. The area of the village was given as 600 acres.

== Infrastructure ==
As of 2011, Gamhira had 1 primary school; it did not have any healthcare facilities. Drinking water was provided by well, hand pump, and tube well; there were no public toilets. The village had a post office but no public library; there was at least some access to electricity for all purposes. Streets were made of both kachcha and pakka materials.
