= Konda Paharpur =

Village in Uttar Pradesh, India

- Village
- Location in Uttar Pradesh, India
- Coordinates: 27.07094°N 79.05927°E
- Country: India
- State: Uttar Pradesh
- District: Mainpuri
- Tehsil: Karhal

Area
  - Total: 0.125 km^{2} (0.048 sq mi)

Population (2011)
  - Total: 463
  - Density: 3,700/km^{2} (9,590/sq mi)
- Time zone: UTC+5:30 (IST)
- PIN: 205268

Konda Paharpur (Koṇḍā Pahāṛpur) is a village in Karhal block of Mainpuri district, Uttar Pradesh. As of 2011, it had a population of 463, in 63 households.

== Demographics ==
As of 2011, Konda Paharpur had a population of 463, in 63 households. This population was 54.2% male (251) and 45.8% female (212). The 0-6 age group numbered 90 (45 male and 45 female), or 19.4% of the total population. 35 residents were members of Scheduled Castes, or 7.6% of the total.

The 1961 census recorded Konda Paharpur as comprising 1 hamlet, with a total population of 277 people (127 male and 100 female), in 39 households and 34 physical houses. The area of the village was given as 296 acres.

== Infrastructure ==
As of 2011, Konda Paharpur had 1 primary school; it did not have any kind of healthcare facility. Drinking water was provided by well, hand pump, and tube well; there were no public toilets. The village had a post office but no public library; there was at least some access to electricity for all purposes. Streets were made of pakka materials.
