= Marhapur =

Village in Uttar Pradesh, India

- Village
- Location in Uttar Pradesh, India
- Coordinates: 27.03299°N 78.9408°E
- Country: India
- State: Uttar Pradesh
- District: Mainpuri
- Tehsil: Karhal

Area
  - Total: 5.346 km^{2} (2.064 sq mi)

Population (2011)
  - Total: 818
  - Density: 153/km^{2} (396/sq mi)
- Time zone: UTC+5:30 (IST)

Marhapur (Maṛhāpur) is a village in Karhal block of Mainpuri district, Uttar Pradesh. As of 2011, it had a population of 818, in 145 households.

== Demographics ==
As of 2011, Marhapur had a population of 818, in 145 households. This population was 53.2% male (435) and 46.8% female (383). The 0-6 age group numbered 125 (68 male and 57 female), or 15.3% of the total population. 300 residents were members of Scheduled Castes, or 36.7% of the total.

The 1981 census recorded Marhapur as having a population of 444 people, in 79 households.

The 1961 census recorded Marhapur as comprising 2 hamlets, with a total population of 292 people (149 male and 143 female), in 58 households and 43 physical houses. The area of the village was given as 588 acres.

== Infrastructure ==
As of 2011, Marhapur had 1 primary school; it did not have any healthcare facilities. Drinking water was provided by well, hand pump, and tube well; there were no public toilets. The village had a post office but no public library; there was at least some access to electricity for all purposes. Streets were made of pakka materials.
