= Sarh, Mainpuri =

Village in Uttar Pradesh, India

Sarh
- Village
- Location in Uttar Pradesh, India
- Coordinates: 26.9921°N 79.05896°E
- Country: India
- State: Uttar Pradesh
- District: Mainpuri
- Tehsil: Karhal

Area
  - Total: 5.204 km^{2} (2.009 sq mi)

Population (2011)
  - Total: 1,735
  - Density: 333.4/km^{2} (863.5/sq mi)
- Time zone: UTC+5:30 (IST)

Sarh (Saṛh) is a village in Karhal block of Mainpuri district, Uttar Pradesh, India. As of 2011, it had a population of 1,735, in 314 households.

== Geography ==
Sarh is located 8 km from Karhal, the tehsil headquarters. There is a prominent jhil here.

== History ==
At the turn of the 20th century, Sarh belonged to the zamindari estate of the Raja of Partabnair.

== Demographics ==
As of 2011, Sarh had a population of 1,735, in 314 households. This population was 54.9% male (953) and 45.1% female (782). The 0-6 age group numbered 240 (134 male and 106 female), or 13.8% of the total population. 296 residents were members of Scheduled Castes, or 17.1% of the total.

The 1981 census recorded Sarh as having a population of 1,237 people, in 213 households.

The 1961 census recorded Sarh as comprising 5 hamlets, with a total population of 866 people (490 male and 376 female), in 133 households and 102 physical houses. The area of the village was given as 1,286 acres.

== Infrastructure ==
As of 2011, Makiyani had 1 primary school; it did not have any kind of healthcare facility. Drinking water was provided by well, hand pump, and tube well; there were no public toilets. The village had a public library but no post office; there was at least some access to electricity for all purposes. Streets were made of both kachcha and pakka materials.
