= Dhankarpur =

Village in Uttar Pradesh, India

- Village
- Location in Uttar Pradesh, India
- Coordinates: 26.98095°N 78.9494°E
- Country: India
- State: Uttar Pradesh
- District: Mainpuri
- Tehsil: Karhal

Area
  - Total: 0.584 km^{2} (0.225 sq mi)

Population (2011)
  - Total: 257
  - Density: 440/km^{2} (1,140/sq mi)
- Time zone: UTC+5:30 (IST)
- PIN: 205264

Dhankarpur (Dhaṅkarpur) is a village in Karhal block of Mainpuri district, Uttar Pradesh. As of 2011, it has a population of 257, in 47 households.

== History ==
The village of Dhankarpur was held rent-free by a Muslim family from the late Mughal era through the early 20th century.

== Demographics ==
As of 2011, Dhankarpur had a population of 257, in 47 households. This population was 54.5% male (140) and 45.5% female (117). The 0-6 age group numbered 34 (18 male and 16 female), or 13.2% of the total population. No residents were members of Scheduled Castes.

The 1961 census recorded Dhankarpur as comprising 2 hamlets, with a total population of 119 people (61 male and 58 female), in 19 households and 13 physical houses. The area of the village was given as 147 acres.

== Infrastructure ==
As of 2011, Dhankarpur had 1 primary school; it did not have any healthcare facilities. Drinking water was provided by well, hand pump, and tube well; there were no public toilets. The village had a post office but no public library; there was at least some access to electricity for all purposes. Streets were made of both kachcha and pakka materials.
