= Udhan =

Village in Uttar Pradesh, India

- Village
- Location in Uttar Pradesh, India
- Coordinates: 27.03884°N 79.02739°E
- Country: India
- State: Uttar Pradesh
- District: Mainpuri
- Tehsil: Karhal

Area
  - Total: 3.712 km^{2} (1.433 sq mi)

Population (2011)
  - Total: 730
  - Density: 200/km^{2} (510/sq mi)
- Time zone: UTC+5:30 (IST)

Udhan (Udhan) is a village in Karhal block of Mainpuri district, Uttar Pradesh. As of 2011, it has a population of 730, in 143 households.

== Demographics ==
As of 2011, Udhan had a population of 730, in 143 households. This population was 56.1% male (411) and 43.7% female (319). The 0-6 age group numbered 105 (67 male and 38 female), or 14.4% of the total population. 1 resident was a Scheduled Caste member, or 0.1% of the total.

The 1961 census recorded Udhan as comprising 4 hamlets, with a total population of 345 people (174 male and 171 female), in 50 households and 35 physical houses. The area of the village was given as 896 acres.

== Infrastructure ==
As of 2011, Udhan had 1 primary school; it did not have any kind of healthcare facility. Drinking water was provided by well; there were no public toilets. The village had a public library but no post office; there was at least some access to electricity for all purposes. Streets were made of both kachcha and pakka materials.
