= Simrau =

Village in Uttar Pradesh, India

- Village
- Location in Uttar Pradesh, India
- Coordinates: 27.02274°N 78.94185°E
- Country: India
- State: Uttar Pradesh
- District: Mainpuri
- Tehsil: Karhal

Area
  - Total: 1.807 km^{2} (0.698 sq mi)

Population (2011)
  - Total: 697
  - Density: 386/km^{2} (999/sq mi)
- Time zone: UTC+5:30 (IST)
- PIN: 205264

Simrau (Simraū) is a village in Karhal block of Mainpuri district, Uttar Pradesh, India. As of 2011, it has a population of 697, in 146 households.

== Demographics ==
As of 2011, Simrau had a population of 697, in 146 households. This population was 54.5% male (380) and 45.5% female (317). The 0-6 age group numbered 79 (40 male and 39 female), or 11.3% of the total population. 23 residents were members of Scheduled Castes, or 3.3% of the total.

The 1981 census recorded Simrau as having a population of 508 people, in 76 households.

The 1961 census recorded Simrau comprising 2 hamlets, with a total population of 317 people (184 male and 133 female), in 63 households and 58 physical houses. The area of the village was given as 454 acres.

== Infrastructure ==
As of 2011, Simrau had 1 primary school; it did not have any healthcare facilities. Drinking water was provided by hand pump; there were no public toilets. The village had a post office but no public library; there was at least some access to electricity for all purposes. Streets were made of both kachcha and pakka materials.
