= Kakbai =

Village in Uttar Pradesh, India

- Village
- Location in Uttar Pradesh, India
- Coordinates: 27.05795°N 78.94396°E
- Country: India
- State: Uttar Pradesh
- District: Mainpuri
- Tehsil: Karhal

Area
  - Total: 2.023 km^{2} (0.781 sq mi)

Population (2011)
  - Total: 988
  - Density: 488/km^{2} (1,260/sq mi)
- Time zone: UTC+5:30 (IST)

Kakbai (Kakbāī) is a village in Karhal block of Mainpuri district, Uttar Pradesh. As of 2011, it has a population of 988, in 180 households.

== Demographics ==
As of 2011, Kakbai had a population of 988, in 180 households. This population was 54.7% male (540) and 45.3% female (448). The 0-6 age group numbered 145 (78 male and 67 female), or 14.7% of the total population. 51 residents were members of Scheduled Castes, or 5.2% of the total.

The 1961 census recorded Kakbai (as "Kakwai") as comprising 4 hamlets, with a total population of 390 people (232 male and 158 female), in 65 households and 50 physical houses. The area of the village was given as 510 acres.

== Infrastructure ==
As of 2011, Kakbai had 1 primary school; it did not have any kind of healthcare facility. Drinking water was provided by hand pump; there were no public toilets. The village had a post office but no public library; there was at least some access to electricity for all purposes. Streets were made of both kachcha and pakka materials.
