= Khirongi =

Village in Uttar Pradesh, India

- Village
- Location in Uttar Pradesh, India
- Coordinates: 26.98963°N 79.00942°E
- Country: India
- State: Uttar Pradesh
- District: Mainpuri
- Tehsil: Karhal

Area
  - Total: 1.683 km^{2} (0.650 sq mi)

Population (2011)
  - Total: 978
  - Density: 581/km^{2} (1,510/sq mi)
- Time zone: UTC+5:30 (IST)

Khirongi (Khiroṅgī) is a village in Karhal block of Mainpuri district, Uttar Pradesh. As of 2011, it has a population of 978, in 197 households.

== Demographics ==
As of 2011, Khirongi had a population of 978, in 197 households. This population was 50.7% male (496) and 49.3% female (482). The 0-6 age group numbered 157 (80 male and 77 female), or 16.1% of the total population. 174 residents were members of Scheduled Castes, or 17.8% of the total.

The 1981 census recorded Khirongi as having a population of 727 people, in 139 households.

The 1961 census recorded Khirongi as comprising 2 hamlets, with a total population of 501 people (290 male and 211 female), in 98 households and 65 physical houses. The area of the village was given as 425 acres.

== Infrastructure ==
As of 2011, Khirongi had 1 primary school; it did not have any healthcare facilities. Drinking water was provided by hand pump; there were no public toilets. The village had a public library but no post office; there was at least some access to electricity for all purposes. Streets were made of kachcha materials.
