= Begampur, Mainpuri =

Village in Uttar Pradesh, India

Begampur
- Village
- Location in Uttar Pradesh, India
- Coordinates: 26.9775°N 79.02186°E
- Country: India
- State: Uttar Pradesh
- District: Mainpuri
- Tehsil: Karhal

Area
  - Total: 2.016 km^{2} (0.778 sq mi)

Population (2011)
  - Total: 567
  - Density: 281/km^{2} (728/sq mi)
- Time zone: UTC+5:30 (IST)

Begampur is a village in Karhal block of Mainpuri district, Uttar Pradesh, India. As of 2011, it had a population of 567, in 100 households.

== Demographics ==
As of 2011, Begampur had a population of 567, in 100 households. This population was 50.4% male (286) and 49.6% female (281). The 0-6 age group numbered 72 (38 male and 32 female), or 12.7% of the total population. No residents were members of Scheduled Castes.

The 1981 census recorded Begampur as having a population of 362 people, in 50 households.

The 1961 census recorded Begampur as comprising 2 hamlets, with a total population of 214 people (119 male and 95 female), in 40 households and 32 physical houses. The area of the village was given as 501 acres.

== Infrastructure ==
As of 2011, Begampur had 1 primary school; it did not have any healthcare facilities. Drinking water was provided by hand pump; there were no public toilets. The village had a post office but no public library; there was at least some access to electricity for all purposes. Streets were made of both kachcha and pakka materials.
