= Rajpur, Mainpuri =

Village in Uttar Pradesh, India

Rajpur
- Village
- Location in Uttar Pradesh, India
- Coordinates: 26.97798°N 78.95779°E
- Country: India
- State: Uttar Pradesh
- District: Mainpuri
- Tehsil: Karhal

Area
  - Total: 2.368 km^{2} (0.914 sq mi)

Population (2011)
  - Total: 1,653
  - Density: 698.1/km^{2} (1,808/sq mi)
- Time zone: UTC+5:30 (IST)

Rajpur (Rājpur) is a village in Karhal block of Mainpuri district, Uttar Pradesh. As of 2011, it has a population of 1,653, in 307 households.

== Demographics ==
As of 2011, Rajpur had a population of 1,653, in 307 households. This population was 51.5% male (851) and 48.5% female (802). The 0-6 age group numbered 280 (127 male and 153 female), or 16.9% of the total population. 492 residents were members of Scheduled Castes, or 29.8% of the total.

The 1961 census recorded Rajpur (as "Rajapur") as comprising 2 hamlets, with a total population of 811 people (425 male and 386 female), in 158 households and 104 physical houses. The area of the village was given as 727 acres.

== Infrastructure ==
As of 2011, Rajpur had 2 primary schools; it did not have any healthcare facilities. Drinking water was provided by hand pump and tube well; there were no public toilets. The village did not have a post office or public library; there was at least some access to electricity for all purposes. Streets were made of both kachcha and pakka materials.
