= Paliya, Mainpuri =

Village in Uttar Pradesh, India

Paliya
- Village
- Location in Uttar Pradesh, India
- Coordinates: 27.05821°N 79.14161°E
- Country: India
- State: Uttar Pradesh
- District: Mainpuri
- Tehsil: Karhal

Area
  - Total: 4.242 km^{2} (1.638 sq mi)

Population (2011)
  - Total: 2,233
  - Density: 526.4/km^{2} (1,363/sq mi)
- Time zone: UTC+5:30 (IST)
- PIN: 205268

Paliya (Pāliyā), also spelled Palia, is a village in Karhal block of Mainpuri district, Uttar Pradesh. As of 2011, it had a population of 2,233, in 427 households.

== Demographics ==
As of 2011, Paliya had a population of 2,233, in 427 households. This population was 51.1% male (1,141) and 48.9% female (1,092). The 0-6 age group numbered 342 (170 male and 172 female), or 15.3% of the total population. 584 residents were members of Scheduled Castes, or 26.2% of the total.

The 1961 census recorded Paliya as comprising 6 hamlets, with a total population of 1,120 people (615 male and 505 female), in 225 households and 170 physical houses. The area of the village was given as 1,058 acres.

== Infrastructure ==
As of 2011, Paliya had 1 primary school; it did not have any kind of healthcare facility. Drinking water was provided by well, hand pump, and tube well; there were no public toilets. The village had a post office but no public library; there was at least some access to electricity for all purposes. Streets were made of both kachcha and pakka materials.
