= Takhrau =

Village in Uttar Pradesh, India

- Village
- Location in Uttar Pradesh, India
- Coordinates: 27.01373°N 79.01653°E
- Country: India
- State: Uttar Pradesh
- District: Mainpuri
- Tehsil: Karhal

Area
  - Total: 7.288 km^{2} (2.814 sq mi)

Population (2011)
  - Total: 2,494
  - Density: 342.2/km^{2} (886.3/sq mi)
- Time zone: UTC+5:30 (IST)
- PIN: 205268

Takhrau (Takhrau) is a village in Karhal block of Mainpuri district, Uttar Pradesh. As of 2011, it has a population of 2,494, in 420 households.

== Demographics ==
As of 2011, Takhrau had a population of 2,494, in 420 households. This population was 55.1% male (1,373) and 44.9% female (1,121). The 0-6 age group numbered 410 (226 male and 184 female), or 16.4% of the total population. 1,172 residents were members of Scheduled Castes, or 47.0% of the total.

The 1961 census recorded Takhrau as comprising 2 hamlets, with a total population of 1,169 people (642 male and 527 female), in 218 households and 204 physical houses. The area of the village was given as 1,802 acres and it had a post office at that point.

== Infrastructure ==
As of 2011, Takhrau had 1 primary school and 1 primary health centre. Drinking water was provided by hand pump and tube well; there were no public toilets. The village had a post office but no public library; there was at least some access to electricity for all purposes. Streets were made of both kachcha and pakka materials.
