= Pandura, Uttar Pradesh =

Village in Uttar Pradesh, India

Pandura
- Village
- Location in Uttar Pradesh, India
- Coordinates: 26.99204°N 79.03053°E
- Country: India
- State: Uttar Pradesh
- District: Mainpuri
- Tehsil: Karhal

Area
  - Total: 3.239 km^{2} (1.251 sq mi)

Population (2011)
  - Total: 1,013
  - Density: 312.8/km^{2} (810.0/sq mi)
- Time zone: UTC+5:30 (IST)

Pandura (Paṇḍurā) is a village in Karhal block of Mainpuri district, Uttar Pradesh. As of 2011, it has a population of 1,013, in 162 households.

== Demographics ==
As of 2011, Pandura had a population of 1,013, in 162 households. This population was 53.2% male (539) and 46.8% female (474). The 0-6 age group numbered 163 (89 male and 74 female), or 16.1% of the total population. 277 residents were members of Scheduled Castes, or 27.3% of the total.

The 1981 census recorded Pandura as having a population of 594 people, in 101 households.

The 1961 census recorded Pandura as comprising 3 hamlets, with a total population of 500 people (260 male and 240 female), in 94 households and 88 physical houses. The area of the village was given as 804 acres.

== Infrastructure ==
As of 2011, Pandura had 1 primary school and 1 maternity and child welfare centre. Drinking water was provided by well and hand pump; there were no public toilets. The village had a post office and public library, as well as at least some access to electricity for all purposes. Streets were made of both kachcha and pakka materials.
