= Buramai =

Village in Uttar Pradesh, India

- Village
- Location in Uttar Pradesh, India
- Coordinates: 26.96735°N 78.88541°E
- Country: India
- State: Uttar Pradesh
- District: Mainpuri
- Tehsil: Karhal

Area
  - Total: 2.223 km^{2} (0.858 sq mi)

Population (2011)
  - Total: 1,381
  - Density: 621.2/km^{2} (1,609/sq mi)
- Time zone: UTC+5:30 (IST)

Buramai (Burāmaī) is a village in Karhal block of Mainpuri district, Uttar Pradesh. As of 2011, it has a population of 1,381, in 243 households.

== Demographics ==
As of 2011, Buramai had a population of 1,381, in 243 households. This population was 55.1% male (761) and 44.9% female (620). The 0-6 age group numbered 172 (87 male and 85 female), or 12.5% of the total population. 119 residents were members of Scheduled Castes, or 8.6% of the total.

The 1981 census recorded Buramai as having a population of 934 people, in 127 households.

The 1961 census recorded Buramai as comprising 3 hamlets, with a total population of 583 people (317 male and 266 female), in 98 households and 65 physical houses. The area of the village was given as 527 acres.

== Infrastructure ==
As of 2011, Buramai had 1 primary school; it did not have any healthcare facilities. Drinking water was provided by well, hand pump, and tube well; there were no public toilets. The village had a post office but no public library; there was at least some access to electricity for all purposes. Streets were made of both kachcha and pakka materials.
