= Karhal =

Town in Mainpuri, Uttar Pradesh, India

- Town
- Location in Uttar Pradesh, India
- Coordinates: 26.9975978°N 78.9415151°E
- Country: India
- State: Uttar Pradesh
- District: Mainpuri
- Tehsil: Karhal

Government
  - Type: Vidhan Sabha
  - Body: Uttar Pradesh

Area
  - Total: 9.58 km^{2} (3.70 sq mi)
  - Rank: 112
- Elevation: 159 m (522 ft)

Population (2025)
  - Total: 38,411
  - Density: 4,010/km^{2} (10,400/sq mi)

Languages
  - Official: Hindi
- Time zone: UTC+5:30 (IST)
- PIN: 205264
- Telephone code: 05677
- Vehicle registration: UP-84
- SDM: R.N. Verma
- MP: Dimple Yadav (Mainpuri constituency)
- MLA: Tej Pratap yadav (Karhal constituency)
- Highways: Agra-Lucknow Expressway, State Highway 83 (Uttar Pradesh)

Karhal is a town and Nagar Panchayat in Mainpuri district in the Indian state of Uttar Pradesh. It is also a tehsil that is subdivided into two blocks, Karhal and Barnahal. It is one of the Vidhan Sabha constituency of Uttar Pradesh.

The nearest town to Karhal is Saifai. It is situated on the State Highway 83.

== Name ==
The name Karhal is also an alternate designation for the main or mainphal tree, scientifically identified as Randia dumetorum. This species is abundant throughout the Mainpuri district, and it is widely speculated that the town derived its name from the extensive presence of karhal trees that once dominated the landscape.

== History ==
Karhal was historically a tappa (subdivision) of the Mughal-era pargana of Haveli Etawah; by the turn of the 20th century, it was itself the seat of both a pargana and a tehsil. At that time, Karhal was described as having a busy trade in ghee and cotton, with market days twice per week. Glass and saltpetre were manufactured here. The town had a Sanskrit school run by Jains, two other schools, a dispensary, a police station, and a sarai (inn) which had a whole gated enclosure with a mosque and a well. Behind the bazar were the prominent merchants' houses, primarily belonging to members of Saraogi subgroup of the Banias, and the spired temples in this areas were described as being visible from a long way off.

== Demographics ==
Historical population
Year	Pop.	±%
1901	6,263	—
1911	6,913	+10.4%
1921	5,364	−22.4%
1931	5,034	−6.2%
1941	5,811	+15.4%
1951	6,107	+5.1%
1961	7,612	+24.6%
1971	9,488	+24.6%
1981	12,638	+33.2%
1991	19,834	+56.9%
2001	24,514	+23.6%
2011	27,701	+13.0%
Source: 2011 Census of India

As of the 2011 census, Karhal had a population of 27,701. This population was 52.2% male (14,456) and 47.8% female (13,245). The 0-6 age group numbered 3,616 (1,873 male and 1,743 female), or 13.1% of the total population. 4,852 residents were members of Scheduled Castes, or 17.5% of the total. The town's literacy rate was 72.3% (counting only people age 7 and up).

=== Tehsil-wide statistics ===
As of 2011, the entire Karhal tehsil had a population of 331,718, making it the least populous tehsil in the district. The overall population predominantly rural, with 91.65% of the population (304,017 people) living in rural areas and 8.35% (27,701 people) living in Karhal town, the tehsil's sole urban area. The tehsil's overall sex ratio was 875 females to every 1000 males. Its literacy rate was 73.97%; there was an 18.5% gender literacy gap, with 82.6% of males but only 64.1% of females capable of reading and writing. This discrepancy was significantly higher in rural areas (19.35%) than in urban ones (9.46%).

The total area of Karhal tehsil is 551.92 sq.km and the population density is 601 per sq.km.

== Economy ==
The most important commodities produced in Karhal are wheat flour and rice products. As of 2009, Karhal had 2 nationalised banks, 1 private commercial bank, 2 cooperative banks, and 5 agricultural credit societies.

=== Agriculture ===
Major populations of the city depend on agriculture and related products. Farmers grow the wheat, patati, tomato, garlic, onion, paddy, matured crops. Ginger, banana, sugar cane, cabbage, torhi, laouki are minor seasonal crops. Cold storage is a major food storage unit in Karhal. A local Karhal Subzi Mandi maintains the daily need of fresh vegetables and fruits of the city and neighborhood local area.

== Neighbourhoods ==
The town's neighbourhoods, or mohallas, include the Khera, or old town; the Qazi Mohalla, named because it contained the old house of the town's former qazi, the Mualliman mohalla, named after an esteemed local family of teachers who, according to local tradition, invented the shikasta form of the Perso-Arabic script; the Bhutela and Birtia mohallas, each named after a Brahmin clan who traditionally lived there; the Khakroh, or sweeper's quarter; and the Singhi mohalla, named after a Bania subcaste.

== Infrastructure ==
As of 2011, Karhal has 1 hospital with 10 beds, 35 medicine shops, 10 schools teaching at the primary level, and 2 schools teaching at the secondary level. There is no public library; the closest one is in Etawah. Drinking water is provided by hand pump, tube well, and borehole. The town has a local fire department.

== Wildlife ==
Saras is the bird species have 2/3 of population in Karhal. Saman Bird Sanctuary is located 20 km from eastern side of Karhal.

== List of villages in Karhal block ==
The following 97 villages are counted as part of Karhal CD block:

1. Ahladpur
2. Aima Naglamir Mohal Awwal
3. Aimanpur
4. Allipur
5. Amamai
6. Andani
7. Anuppur
8. Asrohi
9. Attikullapur
10. Badsui
11. Begampur
12. Bajartalia
13. Bausak
14. Bhanti
15. Bhawanipur
16. Binayakpur
17. Birsinghpur
18. Buramai
19. Chakudhan
20. Chandpura
21. Dadupur
22. Dayampur
23. Deokali
24. Dhankarpur
25. Dhowai
26. Dostpur
27. Dudgaun
28. Dunwa
29. Gadanpur
30. Gamhira
31. Gauri
32. Gopalpur
33. Harer
34. Harwai
35. Jalalpur
36. Jaothri
37. Kabrai
38. Kakbai
39. Kamalpur
40. Kanakpur
41. Kanjhara
42. Karhal (rural)
43. Khajurara Ijjatpur
44. Khera
45. Khirongi
46. Kirthua
47. Konda Paharpur
48. Kurra Jarawan
49. Kursara
50. Kutukpur Buzurg
51. Kutukpur Nasirpur
52. Lahtoi Shahjahanpur
53. Madrawali
54. Makiyani
55. Mamsirpur
56. Manauna
57. Manikpur Parasrampur
58. Manikpur Sahas
59. Marhapur
60. Muhabbatpur
61. Muhammadpur Nagariya
62. Nadrela
63. Nagla Bhogpur
64. Nagla Kondar
65. Nagla Madari
66. Nagla Mateya
67. Nagla Raja
68. Nagla Tikrai
69. Nakau
70. Nasirpur
71. Ninoli
72. Onha
73. Paliya
74. Pandura
75. Pasupur
76. Patara
77. Pirthipur
78. Rajpur
79. Ranipur
80. Rarua
81. Rumpura
82. Sarh
83. Sahabrampur
84. Sahan
85. Sahas
86. Salempur
87. Sarsai Masumpur
88. Sauj
89. Shankarpur
90. Simrau
91. Singhpur
92. Takhrau
93. Taroliya
94. Timrakh
95. Udhan
96. Udnadada
97. Vijaipur
