= Kirthua =

Village in Uttar Pradesh, India

- Village
- Location in Uttar Pradesh, India
- Coordinates: 27.00856°N 78.96967°E
- Country: India
- State: Uttar Pradesh
- District: Mainpuri
- Tehsil: Karhal

Area
  - Total: 9.140 km^{2} (3.529 sq mi)

Population (2011)
  - Total: 4,858
  - Density: 531.5/km^{2} (1,377/sq mi)
- Time zone: UTC+5:30 (IST)
- PIN: 205264

Kirthua (Kirthuā) is a village in Karhal block of Mainpuri district, Uttar Pradesh, India. As of 2011, it has a population of 4,858, in 883 households.

== Demographics ==
As of 2011, Kirthua had a population of 4,858, in 883 households. This population was 54.1% male (2,630) and 45.9% female (2,228). The 0-6 age group numbered 723 (373 male and 350 female), or 14.9% of the total population. 1,305 residents were members of Scheduled Castes, or 26.9% of the total.

The 1961 census recorded Kirthua as comprising 3 hamlets, with a total population of 2,280 people (1,133 male and 1,147 female), in 388 households and 294 physical houses. The area of the village was given as 2,322 acres.

== Infrastructure ==
As of 2011, Kirthua had 3 primary schools; it did not have any healthcare facilities. Drinking water was provided by hand pump and tube well; there were no public toilets. The village had a post office but no public library; there was at least some access to electricity for all purposes. Streets were made of both kachcha and pakka materials.
