= Manikpur Sahas =

Village in Uttar Pradesh, India

- Village
- Location in Uttar Pradesh, India
- Coordinates: 27.08113°N 78.97969°E
- Country: India
- State: Uttar Pradesh
- District: Mainpuri
- Tehsil: Karhal

Area
  - Total: 1.412 km^{2} (0.545 sq mi)

Population (2011)
  - Total: 251
  - Density: 178/km^{2} (460/sq mi)
- Time zone: UTC+5:30 (IST)

Manikpur Sahas (Māṇikpur Sahas) is a village in Karhal block of Mainpuri district, Uttar Pradesh, India. As of 2011, it had a population of 251, in 50 households.

== Demographics ==
As of 2011, Manikpur Sahas had a 251 population in 50 households. This population was 56.6% male (142) and 43.4% female (109). The 0-6 age group numbered 35 (24 male and 11 female), or 13.9% of the total population. 1 resident was a Scheduled Caste member, or 0.4% of the total.

The 1961 census recorded Manikpur Sahas comprising 1 hamlet, with a total population of 109 people (52 male and 57 female), in 21 households and 11 physical houses. The village area was given 348 acres.

== Infrastructure ==
As of 2011, Manikpur Sahas had 1 primary school and no healthcare facility. Drinking water was provided by a well, a hand pump, and a tube well; no public toilets existed. The village did not have a post office or a public library; there was at least some access to electricity for all purposes. Streets were made of both kachcha and pakka materials.
