= Chandpura, Mainpuri =

Village in Uttar Pradesh, India

Chandpura
- Village
- Location in Uttar Pradesh, India
- Coordinates: 26.99567°N 78.86442°E
- Country: India
- State: Uttar Pradesh
- District: Mainpuri
- Tehsil: Karhal

Area
  - Total: 4.348 km^{2} (1.679 sq mi)

Population (2011)
  - Total: 3,162
  - Density: 727.2/km^{2} (1,884/sq mi)
- Time zone: UTC+5:30 (IST)

Chandpura (Chāndpurā) is a village in Karhal block of Mainpuri district, Uttar Pradesh. As of 2011, it has a population of 3,162, in 559 households.

== Demographics ==
As of 2011, Chandpura had a population of 3,162, in 559 households. This population was 54.0% male (1,708) and 46.0% female (1,454). The 0-6 age group numbered 422 (226 male and 196 female), or 13.3% of the total population. 479 residents were members of Scheduled Castes, or 15.1% of the population.

The 1981 census recorded Chandpura (as "Chandarpura") as having a population of 2,113 people, in 366 households.

The 1961 census recorded Chandpura as comprising 5 hamlets, with a total population of 1,430 people (736 male and 694 female), in 248 households and 173 physical houses. The area of the village was given as 1,074 acres and it had a post office at that point.

== Infrastructure ==
As of 2011, Chandpura had 2 primary schools and 1 primary health centre. Drinking water was provided by hand pump and tube well; there were no public toilets. The village had a post office and public library, as well as at least some access to electricity for all purposes. Streets were made of both kachcha and pakka materials.
