= Nagla Madari =

Village in Uttar Pradesh, India

- Village
- Location in Uttar Pradesh, India
- Coordinates: 27.10305°N 78.97386°E
- Country: India
- State: Uttar Pradesh
- District: Mainpuri
- Tehsil: Karhal

Area
  - Total: 1.41 km^{2} (0.54 sq mi)

Population (2011)
  - Total: 684
  - Density: 485/km^{2} (1,260/sq mi)
- Time zone: UTC+5:30 (IST)

Nagla Madari (Naglā Madārī) is a village in Karhal block of Mainpuri district, Uttar Pradesh. As of 2011, it had a population of 684, in 120 households.

== Demographics ==
As of 2011, Nagla Madari had a population of 684, in 120 households. This population was 54.5% male (373) and 45.5% female (311). The 0-6 age group numbered 136 (76 male and 60 female), or 19.9% of the total population. 332 residents were members of Scheduled Castes, or 48.5% of the total.

The 1961 census recorded Nagla Madari as comprising 4 hamlets, with a total population of 268 people (155 male and 113 female), in 53 households and 44 physical houses. The area of the village was given as 361 acres.

== Infrastructure ==
As of 2011, Nagla Madari had 1 primary school; it did not have any kind of healthcare facility. Drinking water was provided by well, hand pump, and tube well; there were no public toilets. The village did not have either a post office or a public library; there was at least some access to electricity for all purposes. Streets were made of both kachcha and pakka materials.
