= Allipur, Mainpuri =

Village in Uttar Pradesh, India

Allipur
- Village
- Location in Uttar Pradesh, India
- Coordinates: 26.99456°N 79.01487°E
- Country: India
- State: Uttar Pradesh
- District: Mainpuri
- Tehsil: Karhal

Area
  - Total: 4.852 km^{2} (1.873 sq mi)

Population (2011)
  - Total: 1,458
  - Density: 300.5/km^{2} (778.3/sq mi)
- Time zone: UTC+5:30 (IST)

Allipur (Allīpur) is a village in Karhal block of Mainpuri district, Uttar Pradesh. As of 2011, it has a population of 1,458, in 260 households.

== Demographics ==
As of 2011, Allipur had a population of 1,458, in 260 households. This population was 54.3% male (792) and 45.7% female (666). The 0-6 age group numbered 242 (137 male and 105 female), or 16.6% of the total population. 134 residents were members of Scheduled Castes, or 9.2% of the total.

The 1961 census recorded Allipur as comprising 4 hamlets, with a total population of 578 people (317 male and 261 female), in 111 households and 82 physical houses. The area of the village was given as 840 acres.

== Infrastructure ==
As of 2011, Allipur had 1 primary school; it did not have any healthcare facilities. Drinking water was provided by hand pump; there were no public toilets. The village had a post office and public library; there was at least some access to electricity for all purposes. Streets were made of kachcha materials.
