= Manikpur Parasrampur =

Village in Uttar Pradesh, India

- Village
- Location in Uttar Pradesh, India
- Coordinates: 27.02351°N 78.92678°E
- Country: India
- State: Uttar Pradesh
- District: Mainpuri
- Tehsil: Karhal

Area
  - Total: 1.267 km^{2} (0.489 sq mi)

Population (2011)
  - Total: 928
  - Density: 732/km^{2} (1,900/sq mi)
- Time zone: UTC+5:30 (IST)

Manikpur Parasrampur (Māṇikpur Parasrāmpur) is a village in Karhal block of Mainpuri district, Uttar Pradesh, India. As of 2011, it has a population of 928, in 169 households.

== Demographics ==
As of 2011, Manikpur Parasrampur had a population of 928, in 169 households. This population was 52.5% male (487) and 47.5% female (441). The 0-6 age group numbered 160 (88 male and 72 female), or 17.2% of the total population. 372 residents were members of Scheduled Castes, or 40.1% of the total.

The 1981 census recorded Manikpur Parasrampur as having a population of 693 people, in 126 households.

The 1961 census recorded Manikpur Parasrampur as comprising 2 hamlets, with a total population of 448 people (248 male and 200 female), in 82 households and 56 physical houses. The area of the village was given as 323 acres.

== Infrastructure ==
As of 2011, Manikpur Parasrampur had 2 primary schools; it did not have any healthcare facilities. Drinking water was provided by hand pump; there were no public toilets. The village had a post office and public library, as well as at least some access to electricity for all purposes. Streets were made of both kachcha and pakka materials.
