= Kabrai, Mainpuri =

Village in Uttar Pradesh, India

Kabrai
- Village
- Location in Uttar Pradesh, India
- Coordinates: 27.01935°N 78.87995°E
- Country: India
- State: Uttar Pradesh
- District: Mainpuri
- Tehsil: Karhal

Area
  - Total: 1.666 km^{2} (0.643 sq mi)

Population (2011)
  - Total: 562
  - Density: 337/km^{2} (874/sq mi)
- Time zone: UTC+5:30 (IST)

Kabrai (Kabraī) is a village in Karhal block of Mainpuri district, Uttar Pradesh. As of 2011, it has a population of 562, in 96 households.

== Demographics ==
As of 2011, Kabrai had a population of 562, in 96 households. This population was 51.6% male (290) and 48.4% female (272). The 0-6 age group numbered 83 (40 male and 43 female), or 14.8% of the total population. 7 residents were members of Scheduled Castes, or 1.2% of the total.

The 1981 census recorded Kabrai as having a population of 439 people, in 76 households.

The 1961 census recorded Kabrai as comprising 3 hamlets, with a total population of 269 people (138 male and 131 female), in 51 households and 34 physical houses. The area of the village was given as 423 acres.

== Infrastructure ==
As of 2011, Kabrai had 1 primary school; it did not have any healthcare facilities. Drinking water was provided by hand pump and tube well; there were no public toilets. The village had a post office but no public library; there was at least some access to electricity for all purposes. Streets were made of both kachcha and pakka materials.
