= Sahan, Mainpuri =

Village in Uttar Pradesh, India

Sahan
- Village
- Location in Uttar Pradesh, India
- Coordinates: 27.07715°N 79.0399°E
- Country: India
- State: Uttar Pradesh
- District: Mainpuri
- Tehsil: Karhal

Area
  - Total: 17.416 km^{2} (6.724 sq mi)

Population (2011)
  - Total: 6,820
  - Density: 392/km^{2} (1,010/sq mi)
- Time zone: UTC+5:30 (IST)

Sahan (Sahan) is a village in Karhal block of Mainpuri district, Uttar Pradesh, India. As of 2011, it had a population of 6,820, in 1,109 households.

== Geography ==
Sahan is located about 16 km south of Mainpuri. It is just south of the Gangsi distributary canal.

== History ==
At the turn of the 20th century, Sahan was described as having a population of 2,186 (as per the 1901 census), 10 hamlets, and a halqabandi school. It then hosted a fair every year in the middle of the month of Baisakh.

== Demographics ==
As of 2011, Sahan had a population of 6,820, in 1,109 households. This population was 53.8% male (3,667) and 46.2% female (3,153). The 0-6 age group numbered 1,030 (541 male and 489 female), or 15.1% of the total population. 815 residents were members of Scheduled Castes, or 12.0% of the total.

The 1961 census recorded Sahan as comprising 11 hamlets, with a total population of 3,016 people (1,557 male and 1,459 female), in 547 households and 447 physical houses. The area of the village was given as 4,375 acres and it had a post office at that point.

== Infrastructure ==
As of 2011, Sahan had 2 primary schools and 1 primary health centre. Drinking water was provided by hand pump and tube well; there were no public toilets. The village had a post office but no public library; there was at least some access to electricity for all purposes. Streets were made of both kachcha and pakka materials.
