= Timrakh =

Village in Uttar Pradesh, India

- Village
- Location in Uttar Pradesh, India
- Coordinates: 27.05044°N 79.11726°E
- Country: India
- State: Uttar Pradesh
- District: Mainpuri
- Tehsil: Karhal

Area
  - Total: 5.204 km^{2} (2.009 sq mi)

Population (2011)
  - Total: 1,769
  - Density: 339.9/km^{2} (880.4/sq mi)
- Time zone: UTC+5:30 (IST)
- PIN: 205268

Timrakh is a village in Karhal block of Mainpuri district, Uttar Pradesh. As of 2011, it had a population of 1,769, in 622 households.

== Geography ==
There is a prominent jhil at Timrakh.

== Demographics ==
As of 2011, Timrakh had a population of 1,769, in 622 households. This population was 54.4% male (964) and 45.6% female (805). The 0-6 age group numbered 270 (149 male and 121 female), or 15.3% of the total population. 474 residents were members of Scheduled Castes, or 26.8% of the total.

The 1961 census recorded Timrakh as comprising 5 hamlets, with a total population of 1,089 people (564 male and 525 female), in 174 households and 146 physical houses. The area of the village was given as 1,286 acres.

== Infrastructure ==
As of 2011, Timrakh had 1 primary school; it did not have any kind of healthcare facility. Drinking water was provided by well and hand pump; there were no public toilets. The village had a post office and public library, as well as at least some access to electricity for all purposes. Streets were made of kachcha materials.
