= Gadanpur =

Village in Uttar Pradesh, India

- Village
- Location in Uttar Pradesh, India
- Coordinates: 27.0356°N 79.1234°E
- Country: India
- State: Uttar Pradesh
- District: Mainpuri
- Tehsil: Karhal

Area
  - Total: 4.240 km^{2} (1.637 sq mi)

Population (2011)
  - Total: 1,842
  - Density: 434.4/km^{2} (1,125/sq mi)
- Time zone: UTC+5:30 (IST)
- PIN: 205268

Gadanpur is a village in Karhal block of Mainpuri district, Uttar Pradesh, India. As of 2011, it had a population of 1,842, in 314 households.

== Demographics ==
As of 2011, Gadanpur had a population of 1,842, in 314 households. The population was 54.5% male (1,003) and 45.5% female (839). The 0-6 age group numbered 301 (161 male and 140 female), or 16.3% of the total population. 733 residents were members of Scheduled Castes, or 39.8% of the total.

The 1961 census recorded Gadanpur as comprising 7 hamlets, with a total population of 829 people (438 male and 391 female), in 165 households and 132 physical houses. The area of the village was given as 1,136 acres.

== Infrastructure ==
As of 2011, Gadanpur had 1 primary school; it did not have any kind of healthcare facility. Drinking water was provided by hand pump; there were no public toilets. The village had a post office and public library, as well as at least some access to electricity for all purposes. Streets were made of kachcha materials.
