= Leo and Paregorius =

Christian martyrs

Saints Leo and Paregorius
- Died: 260; Patara, Lycia (modern-day Gelemiş, Kaş, Antalya, Turkey)
- Feast: 18 February

Saints Leo and Paregorius (Greek: Λεών και Παρηγόριος; died c. 260) were two early Christian martyrs at Patara (Lycia) in Anatolia. Their feast day is 18 February.

== Monks of Ramsgate account ==
The monks of St Augustine's Abbey, Ramsgate wrote in their Book of Saints (1921),

Leo and Paregorius (SS.) MM. (Feb. 18)
(3rd century) Martyrs in Lycia (Asia Minor), in great veneration in the East. They probably suffered about A.D. 260.

== Butler's account ==
The hagiographer Alban Butler (1710–1773) wrote in his Lives of the Fathers, Martyrs, and Other Principal Saints,

SS. Leo and Paregorius, Martyrs

Third Age.

Saint Paregorius having spilt his blood for the faith at Patara, in Lycia, Saint Leo, who had been a witness of his conflict, found his heart divided between joy for his friend’s glorious victory and sorrow to see himself deprived of the happiness of sharing in it. The proconsul of Asia being absent in order to wait on the emperors, probably Valerian and Galien, the governor of Lycia, residing at Patara, to show his zeal for the idols, published an order on the festival of Serapis, to oblige all to offer sacrifice to that false god. Leo seeing the heathens out of superstition, and some Christians out of fear, going in crowds to adore the idol, sighed within himself, and went to offer up his prayers to the true God, on the tomb of Saint Paregorius, to which he passed before the temple of Serapis, it lying in his way to the martyr’s tomb. The heathens that were sacrificing in it knew him to be a Christian by his modesty. He had exercised himself from his childhood in the austerities and devotions of an ascetic life, and possessed, in an eminent degree, chastity, temperance, and all other virtues. His clothes were of a coarse cloth made of camel’s hair.

Not long after his return home from the tomb of the martyr, with his mind full of the glorious exit of his friend, he fell asleep, and from a dream he had on that occasion, understood, when he awaked, that God called him to a conflict of the same kind with that of Saint Paregorius, which filled him with inexpressible joy and comfort. Wherefore the next time he visited the martyr’s tomb, instead of going to the place through by-roads, he went boldly through the market-place, and by the Tychæum, or temple of Fortune, which he saw illuminated with lanterns. He pitied their blindness; and, being moved with zeal for the honour of the true God, he made no scruple to break as many of the lanterns as were within reach, and trampled on the tapers in open view, saying: “Let your gods revenge the injury if they are able to do it.” The priest of the idol having raised the populace, cried out: “Unless this impiety be punished, the goddess Fortune will withdraw her protection from the city.”

An account of this affair soon reached the ears of the governor, who ordered the saint to be brought before him, and on his appearance addressed him in this manner: “Wicked wretch, thy sacrilegious action surely bespeaks thee either ignorant of the immortal gods, or downright mad, in flying in the face of our most divine emperors, whom we justly regard as secondary deities and saviours.” The martyr replied with great calmness: “You are under a great mistake, in supposing a plurality of gods: there is but one, who is the God of heaven and earth, and who does not stand in need of being worshipped after that gross manner that men worship idols. The most acceptable sacrifice we can offer him is that of a contrite and humble heart.” “Answer to your indictment,” said the governor, “and don’t preach your Christianity. I thank the gods, however, that they have riot suffered you to lie concealed after such a sacrilegious attempt. Choose therefore either to sacrifice to them, with those that are here present, or to suffer the punishment due to your impiety.” The martyr said: “The fear of torments shall never draw me from my duty. I am ready to suffer all you shall inflict. All your tortures cannot reach beyond death. Eternal life is not to be attained but by the way of tribulations; the scripture accordingly informs us, that narrow is the way that leadeth to life.”

Since you own the way you walk in is narrow,” said the governor, “exchange it for ours, which is broad and commodious.” “When I called it narrow,” said the martyr, “this was only because it is not entered without difficulty, and that its beginnings are often, attended with afflictions and persecutions for justice sake. But being once entered, it is not difficult to keep in it by the practice of virtue, which helps to widen it and render it easy to those that persevere in it, which has been done by many.” The multitude of Jews and Gentiles cried out to the judge to silence him. But he said, he allowed him liberty of speech, and even offered him his friendship if he would but sacrifice. The confessor answered: “You seem to have forgotten what I just before told you, or you would not have urged me again to sacrifice. Would you have me acknowledge for a deity that which has nothing divine in its nature?” These last words put the governor in a rage, and he ordered the saint to be scourged. Whilst the executioners were tearing his body unmercifully, the judge said to him: “This is nothing to the torments I am preparing for you. If you would have me stop here, you must sacrifice.” Leo said: “O judge, I will repeat to you again what I have so often told you: I own not your gods, nor will I ever sacrifice to them.” The judge said: “Only say the gods are great, and I will discharge you. I really pity your old age.” Leo answered: “If I allow them that title, it can only be with regard to their power of destroying their worshippers.” The judge in a fury said: “I will cause you to be dragged over rocks and stones, till you are torn to pieces.” Leo said: “Any kind of death is welcome to me, that procures me the kingdom of heaven, and introduces me into the company of the blessed.” The judge said: “Obey the edict, and say, the gods are the preservers of the world, or you shall die.” The martyr answered: “You do nothing but threaten: why don’t you proceed to effects?”

The mob began to be clamorous, and the governor, to appease them, was forced to pronounce sentence on the saint, which was, that he should be tied by the feet, and dragged to the torrent, and there executed; and his orders were immediately obeyed in a most cruel manner. The martyr being upon the point of consummating his sacrifice, and obtaining the accomplishment of all his desires, with his eyes lifted up to heaven, prayed thus aloud: “I thank thee, O God, the Father of our Lord Jesus Christ, for not suffering me to be long separated from thy servant Paregorius. I rejoice in what has befallen me as the means of expiating my past sins. I commend my soul to the care of thy holy angels, to be placed by them where it will have nothing to fear from the judgments of the wicked. But thou, O Lord, who willest not the death of a sinner, but his repentance, grant them to know thee, and to find pardon for their crimes, through the merits of thy only son Jesus Christ our Lord. Amen.” He no sooner repeated the word Amen, together with an act of thanksgiving, but he expired. His executioners then took the body and cast it down a great precipice into a deep pit; and notwithstanding the fall, it seemed only to have received a few slight bruises. The very place which was before a frightful precipice, seemed to have changed its nature; and the act says, no more dangers or accidents happened in it to travellers. The Christians took up the martyr’s body, and found it of a lively colour, and entire, and his face appeared comely and smiling; and they buried it in the most honourable manner they could. The Greeks keep his festival on the 18th of February.

== Sources ==
- Butler, Alban (1798), The Lives of the Primitive Fathers, Martyrs, and Other Principal Saints, vol. II, J. Moir This article incorporates text from this source, which is in the public domain.
- St. Augustine's Abbey, Ramsgate (1921), The Book of saints : a dictionary of servants of God canonized by the Catholic Church, London: A. & C. Black, ltd.
