= Nadrela =

Village in Uttar Pradesh, India

- Village
- Location in Uttar Pradesh, India
- Coordinates: 27.0232°N 78.99373°E
- Country: India
- State: Uttar Pradesh
- District: Mainpuri
- Tehsil: Karhal

Area
  - Total: 1.885 km^{2} (0.728 sq mi)

Population (2011)
  - Total: 1,023
  - Density: 542.7/km^{2} (1,406/sq mi)
- Time zone: UTC+5:30 (IST)

Nadrela (Nadrelā) is a village in Karhal block of Mainpuri district, Uttar Pradesh. As of 2011, it has a population of 1,023, in 189 households.

== Demographics ==
As of 2011, Nadrela had a population of 1,023, in 189 households. This population was 54.3% male (555) and 45.7% female (468). The 0-6 age group numbered 169 (94 male and 75 female), or 16.5% of the total population. 470 residents were members of Scheduled Castes, or 45.9% of the total.

The 1961 census recorded Nadrela as comprising 10 hamlets, with a total population of 338 people (179 male and 159 female), in 67 households and 48 physical houses. The area of the village was given as 466 acres.

== Infrastructure ==
As of 2011, Nadrela had 1 primary school; it did not have any healthcare facilities. Drinking water was provided by hand pump and tube well; there were no public toilets. The village had a public library but no post office; there was at least some access to electricity for residential and agricultural purposes. Streets were made of pakka materials.
