= Nagla Bhogpur =

Village in Uttar Pradesh, India

- Village
- Location in Uttar Pradesh, India
- Coordinates: 27.05776°N 79.06217°E
- Country: India
- State: Uttar Pradesh
- District: Mainpuri
- Tehsil: Karhal

Area
  - Total: 2.55 km^{2} (0.98 sq mi)

Population (2011)
  - Total: 591
  - Density: 232/km^{2} (600/sq mi)
- Time zone: UTC+5:30 (IST)
- PIN: 205268

Nagla Bhogpur (Naglā Bhogpur) is a village in Karhal block of Mainpuri district, Uttar Pradesh. As of 2011, it had a population of 591, in 114 households.

== Demographics ==
As of 2011, Nagla Bhogpur had a population of 591, in 114 households. This population was 55.2% male (326) and 44.8% female (265). The 0-6 age group numbered 60 (40 male and 20 female), or 10.2% of the total population. 160 residents were members of Scheduled Castes, or 27.1% of the total.

The 1961 census recorded Nagla Bhogpur as comprising 2 hamlets, with a total population of 480 people (253 male and 227 female), in 92 households and 72 physical houses. The area of the village was given as 635 acres.

== Infrastructure ==
As of 2011, Nagla Bhogpur had 1 primary school; it did not have any kind of healthcare facility. Drinking water was provided by well, hand pump, and tube well; there were no public toilets. The village had a post office but no public library; there was at least some access to electricity for all purposes. Streets were made of pakka materials.
