= Lahtoi Shahjahanpur =

Village in Uttar Pradesh, India

- Village
- Location in Uttar Pradesh, India
- Coordinates: 27.00974°N 78.88796°E
- Country: India
- State: Uttar Pradesh
- District: Mainpuri
- Tehsil: Karhal

Area
  - Total: 1.49 km^{2} (0.58 sq mi)

Population (2011)
  - Total: 617
  - Density: 414/km^{2} (1,070/sq mi)
- Time zone: UTC+5:30 (IST)

Lahtoi Shahjahanpur (Lahṭoī Śāhjahā̃pur) is a village in Karhal block of Mainpuri district, Uttar Pradesh. As of 2011, it had a population of 617, in 123 households.

== Demographics ==
As of 2011, Lahtoi Shahjahanpur had a population of 617, in 123 households. This population was 52.8% male (326) and 47.2% female (291). The 0-6 age group numbered 76 (33 male and 43 female), or 12.3% of the total population. 24 residents were members of Scheduled Castes, or 3.9% of the total.

The 1981 census recorded Lahtoi Shahjahanpur as having a population of 591 people, in 93 households.

The 1961 census recorded Lahtoi Shahjahanpur as comprising 2 hamlets, with a total population of 425 people (229 male and 196 female), in 78 households and 54 physical houses. The area of the village was given as 350 acres.

== Infrastructure ==
As of 2011, Lahtoi Shahjahanpur had 1 primary school; it did not have any healthcare facilities. Drinking water was provided by hand pump and tube well/borehole; there were no public toilets. The village had a post office but no public library; there was at least some access to electricity for all purposes. Streets were made of both kachcha and pakka materials.
