= Kursara =

Village in Uttar Pradesh, India

- Village
- Location in Uttar Pradesh, India
- Coordinates: 27.10868°N 79.05622°E
- Country: India
- State: Uttar Pradesh
- District: Mainpuri
- Tehsil: Karhal

Area
  - Total: 1.832 km^{2} (0.707 sq mi)

Population (2011)
  - Total: 396
  - Density: 216/km^{2} (560/sq mi)
- Time zone: UTC+5:30 (IST)
- PIN: 205268

Kursara (Kursarā) is a village in Karhal block of Mainpuri district, Uttar Pradesh, India. As of 2011, it had a population of 396, in 69 households.

== Demographics ==
As of 2011, Kursara had a population of 396, in 69 households. This population was 54.0% male (214) and 46.0% female (182). The 0-6 age group numbered 74 (49 male and 25 female), or 18.7% of the total population. 49 residents were members of Scheduled Castes, or 12.4% of the total.

The 1961 census recorded Kursara as comprising one hamlet, with a total population of 130 people (77 male and 53 female), in 24 households and 12 physical houses. The area of the village was given as 453 acres.

== Infrastructure ==
As of 2011, Kursara had one primary school; it did not have any kind of healthcare facility. Drinking water was provided by hand pump; there were no public toilets. The village had a post office but no public library; there was at least some access to electricity for all purposes. Streets were made of both kachcha and pakka materials.
