= Binayakpur =

Village in Uttar Pradesh, India

- Village
- Location in Uttar Pradesh, India
- Coordinates: 27.0937187°N 79.0552102°E
- Country: India
- State: Uttar Pradesh
- District: Mainpuri
- Tehsil: Karhal

Area
  - Total: 1.793 km^{2} (0.692 sq mi)

Population (2011)
  - Total: 2,069
  - Density: 1,154/km^{2} (2,989/sq mi)
- Time zone: UTC+5:30 (IST)
- PIN: 205268

Binayakpur (Bināyākpur) is a village in Karhal block of Mainpuri district, Uttar Pradesh. As of 2011, it has a population of 2,069, in 355 households.

== Demographics ==
As of 2011, Binayakpur had a population of 2,069, in 355 households. This population was 50.8% male (1,052) and 49.2% female (1,017). The 0-6 age group numbered 328 (165 male and 163 female), or 15.9% of the total population. 445 residents were members of Scheduled Castes, or 21.5% of the total.

The 1961 census recorded Binayakpur as comprising 1 hamlet, with a total population of 840 people (443 male and 397 female), in 146 6households and 98 physical houses. The area of the village was given as 457 acres.

== Infrastructure ==
As of 2011, Binayakpur had 1 primary school; it did not have any kind of healthcare facility. Drinking water was provided by well, hand pump, and tube well; there were no public toilets. The village had a post office and public library, as well as at least some access to electricity for all purposes. Streets were made of both kachcha and pakka materials.
