= Nagla Tikrai =

Village in Uttar Pradesh, India

- Village
- Location in Uttar Pradesh, India
- Coordinates: 27.05638°N 79.0514°E
- Country: India
- State: Uttar Pradesh
- District: Mainpuri
- Tehsil: Karhal

Area
  - Total: 0.952 km^{2} (0.368 sq mi)

Population (2011)
  - Total: 638
  - Density: 670/km^{2} (1,740/sq mi)
- Time zone: UTC+5:30 (IST)
- PIN: 205268

Nagla Tikrai (Naglā Ṭikraī) is a village in Karhal block of Mainpuri district, Uttar Pradesh. As of 2011, it had a population of 638, in 125 households.

== Demographics ==
As of 2011, Nagla Tikrai had a population of 638, in 125 households. This population was 52.3% male (327) and 48.7% female (311). The 0-6 age group numbered 98 (48 male and 50 female), or 15.4% of the total population. 124 residents were members of Scheduled Castes, or 19.4% of the total.

The 1981 census recorded Nagla Tikrai as having a population of 539 people, in 93 households.

The 1961 census recorded Nagla Tikrai as comprising 1 hamlet, with a total population of 352 people (190 male and 162 female), in 74 households and 41 physical houses. The area of the village was given as 241 acres.

== Infrastructure ==
As of 2011, Nagla Tikrai had 1 primary school; it did not have any kind of healthcare facility. Drinking water was provided by well, hand pump, and tube well; there were no public toilets. The village had a post office but no public library; there was at least some access to electricity for all purposes. Streets were made of pakka materials.
