= Deokali, Mainpuri =

Village in Uttar Pradesh, India

Deokali
- Village
- Location in Uttar Pradesh, India
- Coordinates: 27.03855°N 79.07687°E
- Country: India
- State: Uttar Pradesh
- District: Mainpuri
- Tehsil: Karhal

Area
  - Total: 3.90 km^{2} (1.51 sq mi)

Population (2011)
  - Total: 805
  - Density: 206/km^{2} (535/sq mi)
- Time zone: UTC+5:30 (IST)
- PIN: 205268

Deokali (Devkālī) is a village in Karhal block of Mainpuri district, Uttar Pradesh. As of 2011, it had a population of 805, in 145 households.

== Demographics ==
As of 2011, Deokali had a population of 805, in 145 households. This population was 53.2% male (428) and 46.8% female (377). The 0-6 age group numbered 100 (51 male and 49 female), or 12.4% of the total population. 138 residents were members of Scheduled Castes, or 17.1% of the total.

The 1961 census recorded Deokali as comprising 4 hamlets, with a total population of 294 people (155 male and 139 female), in 46 households and 41 physical houses. The area of the village was given as 971 acres.

== Infrastructure ==
As of 2011, Deokali had 3 primary schools; it did not have any kind of healthcare facility. Drinking water was provided by tap and hand pump; there were no public toilets. The village had a post office but no public library; there was at least some access to electricity for all purposes. Streets were made of both kachcha and pakka materials.
