= Bhanti =

Village in Uttar Pradesh, India

- Village
- Location in Uttar Pradesh, India
- Coordinates: 27.02091°N 79.05114°E
- Country: India
- State: Uttar Pradesh
- District: Mainpuri
- Tehsil: Karhal

Area
  - Total: 8.533 km^{2} (3.295 sq mi)

Population (2011)
  - Total: 3,055
  - Density: 358.0/km^{2} (927.3/sq mi)
- Time zone: UTC+5:30 (IST)

Bhanti (Bhantī) is a village in Karhal block of Mainpuri district, Uttar Pradesh, India. As of 2011, it had a population of 3,055, in 530 households.

== Geography ==
There is a prominent jhil at Bhanti.

== Demographics ==
As of 2011, Bhanti had a population of 3,055, in 530 households. This population was 55.2% male (1,687) and 44.8% female (1,368). The 0-6 age group numbered 453 (249 male and 204 female), or 14.8% of the total population. 272 residents were members of Scheduled Castes, or 8.9% of the total.

The 1961 census recorded Bhanti as comprising 10 hamlets, with a total population of 1,475 people (797 male and 678 female), in 271 households and 189 physical houses. The area of the village was given as 2,149 acres.

== Infrastructure ==
As of 2011, Bhanti had 2 primary schools; it did not have any kind of healthcare facility. Drinking water was provided by well and hand pump; there were no public toilets. The village had a post office but no public library; there was at least some access to electricity for all purposes. Streets were made of both kachcha and pakka materials.
