= Kanakpur, Mainpuri =

Village in Uttar Pradesh, India

Kanakpur
- Village
- Location in Uttar Pradesh, India
- Coordinates: 27.00483°N 78.95291°E
- Country: India
- State: Uttar Pradesh
- District: Mainpuri
- Tehsil: Karhal

Area
  - Total: 0.51 km^{2} (0.20 sq mi)

Population (2011)
  - Total: 444
  - Density: 870/km^{2} (2,300/sq mi)
- Time zone: UTC+5:30 (IST)
- PIN: 205264

Kanakpur (Kanakpur) is a village in Karhal block of Mainpuri district, Uttar Pradesh. As of 2011, it has a population of 444, in 87 households.

== Demographics ==
As of 2011, Kanakpur had a population of 444, in 87 households. This population was 51.1% male (227) and 48.9% female (217). The 0-6 age group numbered 65 (34 male and 31 female), or 14.6% of the total population. No residents were members of Scheduled Castes.

The 1961 census recorded Kanakpur as comprising 1 hamlet, with a total population of 76 people (41 male and 35 female), in 12 households and 10 physical houses. The area of the village was given as 127 acres.

== Infrastructure ==
As of 2011, Kanakpur had 1 primary school; it did not have any healthcare facilities. Drinking water was provided by well, hand pump, and tube well; there were no public toilets. The village had a post office but no public library; there was at least some access to electricity for all purposes. Streets were made of both kachcha and pakka materials.
