= Rarua =

Village in Uttar Pradesh, India

- Village
- Location in Uttar Pradesh, India
- Coordinates: 26.97652°N 79.04238°E
- Country: India
- State: Uttar Pradesh
- District: Mainpuri
- Tehsil: Karhal

Area
  - Total: 3.602 km^{2} (1.391 sq mi)

Population (2011)
  - Total: 1,041
  - Density: 289.0/km^{2} (748.5/sq mi)
- Time zone: UTC+5:30 (IST)
- PIN: 205268

Rarua (Raruā) is a village in Karhal block of Mainpuri district, Uttar Pradesh. As of 2011, it has a population of 1,041, in 182 households.

== Demographics ==
As of 2011, Rarua had a population of 1,041, in 182 households. This population was 52.9% male (551) and 47.1% female (490). The 0-6 age group numbered 157 (80 male and 77 female), or 15.1% of the total population. 163 residents were members of Scheduled Castes, or 15.7% of the total.

The 1981 census recorded Rarua as having a population of 902 people, in 159 households.

The 1961 census recorded Rarua as comprising 6 hamlets, with a total population of 647 people (338 male and 309 female), in 120 households and 92 physical houses.

== Infrastructure ==
As of 2011, Rarua had 1 primary school and 1 maternity and child welfare centre. Drinking water was provided by well and hand pump; there were no public toilets. The village did not have a post office or public library; there was at least some access to electricity for all purposes. Streets were made of both kachcha and pakka materials.
