= Bhawanipur, Mainpuri =

Village in Uttar Pradesh, India

Bhawanipur
- Village
- Location in Uttar Pradesh, India
- Coordinates: 27.06452°N 79.05395°E
- Country: India
- State: Uttar Pradesh
- District: Mainpuri
- Tehsil: Karhal

Area
  - Total: 2.605 km^{2} (1.006 sq mi)

Population (2011)
  - Total: 1,472
  - Density: 565.1/km^{2} (1,464/sq mi)
- Time zone: UTC+5:30 (IST)
- PIN: 205268

Bhawanipur (Bhawānīpur) is a village in Karhal block of Mainpuri district, Uttar Pradesh. As of 2011, it had a population of 1,472, in 270 households.

== Demographics ==
As of 2011, Bhawanipur had a population of 1,472, in 270 households. This population was 53.3% male (784) and 46.7% female (688). The 0-6 age group numbered 203 (122 male and 81 female), or 13.8% of the total population. 389 residents were members of Scheduled Castes, or 26.4% of the total.

The 1961 census recorded Bhawanipur as comprising 2 hamlets, with a total population of 821 people (440 male and 381 female), in 148 households and 104 physical houses. The area of the village was given as 684 acres.

== Infrastructure ==
As of 2011, Bhawanipur had 1 primary school; it did not have any kind of healthcare facility. Drinking water was provided by well and hand pump; there were no public toilets. The village had a public library but no post office; there was at least some access to electricity for all purposes. Streets were made of both kachcha and pakka materials.
