= Nagla Kondar =

Village in Uttar Pradesh, India

- Village
- Location in Uttar Pradesh, India
- Coordinates: 27.04155°N 79.06981°E
- Country: India
- State: Uttar Pradesh
- District: Mainpuri
- Tehsil: Karhal

Area
  - Total: 0.773 km^{2} (0.298 sq mi)

Population (2011)
  - Total: 400
  - Density: 520/km^{2} (1,300/sq mi)
- Time zone: UTC+5:30 (IST)
- PIN: 205268

Nagla Kondar (Naglā Kondar) is a village in Karhal block of Mainpuri district, Uttar Pradesh, India. As of 2011, it had a population of 400, in 63 households.

== Demographics ==
As of 2011, Nagla Kondar had a population of 400, in 63 households. This population was 52.25% male (209) and 47.75% female (191). The 0-6 age group numbered 60 (23 male and 37 female), or 15.00% of the total population. 37 residents were members of Scheduled Castes, or 9.25% of the total.

The 1961 census recorded Nagla Kondar as comprising 1 hamlet, with a total population of 171 people (97 male and 74 female), in 33 households and 27 physical houses. The area of the village was given as 190 acres.

== Infrastructure ==
As of 2011, Nagla Kondar had 1 primary school; it did not have any kind of healthcare facility. Drinking water was provided by well, hand pump, and tube well; there were no public toilets. The village had a post office but no public library; there was at least some access to electricity for all purposes. Streets were made of pakka materials.
