= Shankarpur, Mainpuri =

Village in Uttar Pradesh, India

Shankarpur
- Village
- Location in Uttar Pradesh, India
- Coordinates: 27.06411°N 79.1199°E
- Country: India
- State: Uttar Pradesh
- District: Mainpuri
- Tehsil: Karhal

Area
  - Total: 2.093 km^{2} (0.808 sq mi)

Population (2011)
  - Total: 1,057
  - Density: 505.0/km^{2} (1,308/sq mi)
- Time zone: UTC+5:30 (IST)
- PIN: 205268

Shankarpur (Śaṅkarpur) is a village in Karhal block of Mainpuri district, Uttar Pradesh. As of 2011, it has a population of 1,057, in 198 households.

== Demographics ==
As of 2011, Shankarpur had a population of 1,057, in 198 households. This population was 52.7% male (557) and 47.3% female (500). The 0-6 age group numbered 208 (103 male and 105 female), or 19.7% of the total population. 90 residents were members of Scheduled Castes, or 8.5% of the total.

The 1961 census recorded Shankarpur as comprising 2 hamlets, with a total population of 550 people (289 male and 261 female), in 105 households and 77 physical houses. The area of the village was given as 517 acres.

== Infrastructure ==
As of 2011, Shankarpur had 1 primary school; it did not have any kind of healthcare facility. Drinking water was provided by well and hand pump; there were no public toilets. The village had no post office or public library; there was at least some access to electricity for all purposes. Streets were made of both kachcha and pakka materials.
