= Salempur, Karhal =

Village in Uttar Pradesh, India

Salempur
- Village
- Location in Uttar Pradesh, India
- Coordinates: 27.0064°N 79.0361°E
- Country: India
- State: Uttar Pradesh
- District: Mainpuri
- Tehsil: Karhal

Area
  - Total: 1.424 km^{2} (0.550 sq mi)

Population (2011)
  - Total: 563
  - Density: 395/km^{2} (1,020/sq mi)
- Time zone: UTC+5:30 (IST)
- PIN: 205264

Salempur (Salempur) is a village in Karhal block of Mainpuri district, Uttar Pradesh. As of 2011, it has a population of 563, in 81 households.

== Demographics ==
As of 2011, Salempur had a population of 563, in 81 households. This population was 57.0% male (321) and 43.0% female (242). The 0-6 age group numbered 86 (47 male and 39 female), or 15.3% of the total population. No residents were members of Scheduled Castes.

The 1961 census recorded Salempur as comprising 1 hamlet, with a total population of 198 people (109 male and 89 female), in 38 households and 29 physical houses. The area of the village was given as 371 acres.

== Infrastructure ==
As of 2011, Salempur did not have any kind of schools or healthcare facilities. Drinking water was provided by hand pump; there were no public toilets. The village had a post office but no public library; there was at least some access to electricity for all purposes. Streets were made of both kachcha and pakka materials.
