= Nagla Raja =

Village in Uttar Pradesh, India

- Village
- Location in Uttar Pradesh, India
- Coordinates: 27.09316°N 78.97332°E
- Country: India
- State: Uttar Pradesh
- District: Mainpuri
- Tehsil: Karhal

Area
  - Total: 0.619 km^{2} (0.239 sq mi)

Population (2011)
  - Total: 111
  - Density: 179/km^{2} (464/sq mi)
- Time zone: UTC+5:30 (IST)

Nagla Raja (Naglā Rājā) is a village in Karhal block of Mainpuri district, Uttar Pradesh. As of 2011, it had a population of 111, in 19 households.

== Demographics ==
As of 2011, Nagla Raja had a population of 111, in 19 households. This population was 55.0% male (61) and 45.0% female (50). The 0-6 age group numbered 17 (14 male and 3 female), or 15.3% of the total population. No residents were members of Scheduled Castes.

The 1961 census recorded Nagla Raja as comprising 1 hamlet, with a total population of 57 people (29 male and 28 female), in 11 households and 9 physical houses. The area of the village was given as 153 acres.

== Infrastructure ==
As of 2011, Nagla Raja had 1 primary school; it did not have any kind of healthcare facility. Drinking water was provided by well, hand pump, and tube well; there were no public toilets. The village had a post office but no public library; there was at least some access to electricity for all purposes. Streets were made of pakka materials.
