= Nakau =

Village in Uttar Pradesh, India

- Village
- Location in Uttar Pradesh, India
- Coordinates: 27.02842°N 78.91701°E
- Country: India
- State: Uttar Pradesh
- District: Mainpuri
- Tehsil: Karhal

Area
  - Total: 4.254 km^{2} (1.642 sq mi)

Population (2011)
  - Total: 2,652
  - Density: 623.4/km^{2} (1,615/sq mi)
- Time zone: UTC+5:30 (IST)

Nakau (Nākaū) is a village in Karhal block of Mainpuri district, Uttar Pradesh. As of 2011, it has a population of 2,652, in 490 households.

== Demographics ==
As of 2011, Nakau had a population of 2,652, in 490 households. This population was 53.0% male (1,405) and 47.0% female (1,247). The 0-6 age group numbered 423 (231 male and 192 female), or 16.0% of the total population. 780 residents were members of Scheduled Castes, or 29.4% of the total.

The 1981 census recorded Nakau as having a population of 1,495 people, in 248 households.

The 1961 census recorded Nakau as comprising 4 hamlets, with a total population of 1,033 people (551 male and 482 female), in 174 households and 151 physical houses. The area of the village was given as 1,070 acres.

== Infrastructure ==
As of 2011, Nakau had 1 primary school; it did not have any healthcare facilities. Drinking water was provided by hand pump; there were no public toilets. The village had a post office and public library, as well as at least some access to electricity for all purposes. Streets were made of pakka materials.
