= Taroliya =

Village in Uttar Pradesh, India

- Village
- Location in Uttar Pradesh, India
- Coordinates: 26.99225°N 79.0868°E
- Country: India
- State: Uttar Pradesh
- District: Mainpuri
- Tehsil: Karhal

Area
  - Total: 3.186 km^{2} (1.230 sq mi)

Population (2011)
  - Total: 1,715
  - Density: 538.3/km^{2} (1,394/sq mi)
- Time zone: UTC+5:30 (IST)
- PIN: 205268

Taroliya (Taroliyā), also spelled Tarolia, is a village in Karhal block of Mainpuri district, Uttar Pradesh. As of 2011, it had a population of 1,715, in 297 households.

== Demographics ==
As of 2011, Taroliya had a population of 1,715, in 297 households. This population was 55.0% male (943) and 45.0% female (772). The 0-6 age group numbered 244 (141 male and 103 female), or 14.2% of the total population. 158 residents were members of Scheduled Castes, or 9.2% of the total.

The 1961 census recorded Taroliya (as "Taraulia") as comprising 3 hamlets, with a total population of 703 people (382 male and 321 female), in 130 households and 92 physical houses. The area of the village was given as 943 acres.

== Infrastructure ==
As of 2011, Taroliya had 1 primary school; it did not have any kind of healthcare facility. Drinking water was provided by hand pump; there were no public toilets. The village did not have either a post office or public library; there was at least some access to electricity for all purposes. Streets were made of both kachcha and pakka materials.
