= Harer, India =

Village in Uttar Pradesh, India

Harer
- Village
- Location in Uttar Pradesh, India
- Coordinates: 27.0691°N 79.12289°E
- Country: India
- State: Uttar Pradesh
- District: Mainpuri
- Tehsil: Karhal

Area
  - Total: 4.121 km^{2} (1.591 sq mi)

Population (2011)
  - Total: 1,658
  - Density: 402.3/km^{2} (1,042/sq mi)
- Time zone: UTC+5:30 (IST)
- PIN: 205268

Harer (Hārer) is a village in Karhal block of Mainpuri district, Uttar Pradesh. As of 2011, it had a population of 1,658, in 296 households.

== Geography ==
There is a prominent wetlands area (jheel) at Harer.

== Demographics ==
As of 2011, Harer had a population of 1,658, in 296 households. This population was 52.5% male (871) and 47.5% female (787). The 0-6 age group numbered 264 (136 male and 128 female), or 15.9% of the total population. 340 residents were members of Scheduled Castes, or 20.5% of the total.

The 1961 census recorded Harer as comprising 5 hamlets, with a total population of 652 people (357 male and 295 female), in 68 households and 52 physical houses. The area of the village was given as 1,018 acres.

== Infrastructure ==
As of 2011, Harer had 1 primary school; it did not have any kind of healthcare facility. Drinking water was provided by well and hand pump; there were no public toilets. The village had a post office but no public library; there was at least some access to electricity for all purposes. Streets were made of both kachcha and pakka materials.
