= Pasupur =

Village in Uttar Pradesh, India

- Village
- Location in Uttar Pradesh, India
- Coordinates: 26.97884°N 79.01019°E
- Country: India
- State: Uttar Pradesh
- District: Mainpuri
- Tehsil: Karhal

Area
  - Total: 3.064 km^{2} (1.183 sq mi)

Population (2011)
  - Total: 921
  - Density: 301/km^{2} (779/sq mi)
- Time zone: UTC+5:30 (IST)

Pasupur (Pasupur) is a village in Karhal block of Mainpuri district, Uttar Pradesh, India. As of 2011, it had a population of 921, in 167 households.

== Demographics ==
As of 2011, Pasupur had a population of 921, in 167 households. This population was 50.4% male (485) and 47.3% female (436). The 0-6 age group numbered 126 (61 male and 65 female), or 22.2% of the total population. 177 residents were members of Scheduled Castes, or 31.2% of the total.

The 1961 census recorded Pasupur as comprising 4 hamlets, with a total population of 531 people (303 male and 228 female), in 97 households and 75 physical houses. The area of the village was given as 776 acres.

== Infrastructure ==
As of 2011, Pasupur had 1 primary school; it did not have any healthcare facilities. Drinking water was provided by hand pump; there were no public toilets. The village had a post office and public library, as well as at least some access to electricity for all purposes. Streets were made of kachcha materials.
