= Andani =

Village in Uttar Pradesh, India

- Village
- Location in Uttar Pradesh, India
- Coordinates: 27.05049°N 78.96021°E
- Country: India
- State: Uttar Pradesh
- District: Mainpuri
- Tehsil: Karhal

Area
  - Total: 12.60 km^{2} (4.86 sq mi)

Population (2011)
  - Total: 2,515
  - Density: 199.6/km^{2} (517.0/sq mi)
- Time zone: UTC+5:30 (IST)
- PIN: 206264

Andani (Andanī) is a village in Karhal block of Mainpuri district, Uttar Pradesh. As of 2011, it had a population of 2,515, in 440 households.

== Demographics ==
As of 2011, Andani had a population of 2,515, in 440 households. This population was 55.1% male (1,385) and 44.9% female (1,130). The 0-6 age group numbered 299 (175 male and 124 female), or 11.9% of the total population. 393 residents were members of Scheduled Castes, or 15.6% of the total.

The 1961 census recorded Andani as comprising 4 hamlets, with a total population of 1,081 people (578 male and 503 female), in 202 households and 160 physical houses. The area of the village was given as 1,297 acres.

== Infrastructure ==
As of 2011, Andani had 3 primary schools; it did not have any kind of healthcare facility. Drinking water was provided by well, hand pump, and tube well; there were no public toilets. The village had a post office but no public library; there was at least some access to electricity for all purposes. Streets were made of pakka materials.
