= Anuppur, Mainpuri =

Village in Uttar Pradesh, India

Anuppur
- Village
- Location in Uttar Pradesh, India
- Coordinates: 27.04562°N 79.03191°E
- Country: India
- State: Uttar Pradesh
- District: Mainpuri
- Tehsil: Karhal

Area
  - Total: 2.526 km^{2} (0.975 sq mi)

Population (2011)
  - Total: 1,181
  - Density: 467.5/km^{2} (1,211/sq mi)
- Time zone: UTC+5:30 (IST)
- PIN: 205268

Anuppur (Anūppur) is a village in Karhal block of Mainpuri district, Uttar Pradesh, India.

== Demographics ==
As of 2011, Anuppur had a population of 1,181, in 191 households. This population was 54.4% male (642) and 45.6% female (539). The 0-6 age group numbered 179 (101 male and 78 female), or 15.2% of the total population. 188 residents were members of Scheduled Castes, or 15.9% of the total.

The 1961 census recorded Anuppur (as "Anooppur") as comprising 2 hamlets, with a total population of 497 people (269 male and 228 female), in 66 households and 32 physical houses. The area of the village was given as 635 acres.

== Infrastructure ==
As of 2011, Anuppur had 1 primary school; it did not have any kind of healthcare facility. Drinking water was provided by well, hand pump, and tube well; there were no public toilets. The village had a public library but no post office; there was at least some access to electricity for all purposes. Streets were made of pakka materials.
