= Aimanpur =

Village in Uttar Pradesh, India

- Village
- Location in Uttar Pradesh, India
- Coordinates: 27.02637°N 78.9697°E
- Country: India
- State: Uttar Pradesh
- District: Mainpuri
- Tehsil: Karhal

Area
  - Total: 3.294 km^{2} (1.272 sq mi)

Population (2011)
  - Total: 1,917
  - Density: 582.0/km^{2} (1,507/sq mi)
- Time zone: UTC+5:30 (IST)

Aimanpur (Aimanpur) is a village in Karhal block of Mainpuri district, Uttar Pradesh, India. As of 2011, it had a population of 1,917, in 316 households.

== Demographics ==
As of 2011, Aimanpur had a population of 1,917, in 316 households. This population was 50.5% male (969) and 49.5% female (948). The 0-6 age group numbered 285 (134 male and 151 female), or 14.9% of the total population. 278 residents were members of Scheduled Castes, or 14.5% of the total.

The 1961 census recorded Aimanpur as comprising 3 hamlets, with a total population of 690 people (364 male and 326 female), in 104 households and 89 physical houses. The area of the village was given as 820 acres.

== Infrastructure ==
As of 2011, Aimanpur had 3 primary schools; it did not have any medical facilities. Drinking water was provided by hand pump; there were no public toilets. The village did not have a post office or public library; there was at least some access to electricity for all purposes. Streets were made of both kachcha and pakka materials.
