= Onha =

Village in Uttar Pradesh, India

- Village
- Location in Uttar Pradesh, India
- Coordinates: 27.04513°N 79.05342°E
- Country: India
- State: Uttar Pradesh
- District: Mainpuri
- Tehsil: Karhal

Area
  - Total: 5.752 km^{2} (2.221 sq mi)

Population (2011)
  - Total: 1,992
  - Density: 346.3/km^{2} (896.9/sq mi)
- Time zone: UTC+5:30 (IST)

Onha, also spelled Onaha (Onhā), is a village in Karhal block of Mainpuri district, Uttar Pradesh. As of 2011, it had a population of 1,992, in 374 households.

== Demographics ==
As of 2011, Onha had a population of 1,992, in 374 households. This population was 53.8% male (1,072) and 46.2% female (920). The 0-6 age group numbered 304 (153 male and 151 female), or 15.3% of the total population. 114 residents were members of Scheduled Castes, or 5.7% of the total.

The 1961 census recorded Onha (as "Aunha") as comprising 5 hamlets, with a total population of 1,174 people (613 male and 561 female), in 220 households and 181 physical houses. The area of the village was given as 1,449 acres.

== Infrastructure ==
As of 2011, Onha had 3 primary schools; it did not have any kind of healthcare facility. Drinking water was provided by tap and hand pump; there were no public toilets. The village had no post office or public library; there was at least some access to electricity for all purposes. Streets were made of both kachcha and pakka materials.
