= Makiyani =

Village in Uttar Pradesh, India

- Village
- Location in Uttar Pradesh, India
- Coordinates: 27.0838°N 79.06958°E
- Country: India
- State: Uttar Pradesh
- District: Mainpuri
- Tehsil: Karhal

Area
  - Total: 0.765 km^{2} (0.295 sq mi)

Population (2011)
  - Total: 495
  - Density: 647/km^{2} (1,680/sq mi)
- Time zone: UTC+5:30 (IST)
- PIN: 205268

Makiyani (Makiyānī) is a village in Karhal block of Mainpuri district, Uttar Pradesh. As of 2011, it has a population of 495, in 76 households.

== Demographics ==
As of 2011, Makiyani had a population of 495, in 76 households. This population was 55.8% male (276) and 44.2% female (219). The 0-6 age group numbered 78 (41 male and 37 female), or 15.6% of the total population. 35 residents were members of Scheduled Castes, or 7.1% of the total.

The 1961 census recorded Makiyani as comprising 2 hamlets, with a total population of 138 people (76 male and 62 female), in 32 households and 19 physical houses. The area of the village was given as 196 acres.

== Infrastructure ==
As of 2011, Makiyani had 1 secondary school and 0 primary schools; it did not have any kind of healthcare facility. Drinking water was provided by well; there were no public toilets. The village had a post office but no public library; there was at least some access to electricity for all purposes. Streets were made of both kachcha and pakka materials.
