= Kurra Jarawan =

Village in Uttar Pradesh, India

Kurra Jarawan Kurra
- Village
- Location in Uttar Pradesh, India
- Coordinates: 27°01′05″N 79°05′49″E
- Country: India
- State: Uttar Pradesh
- District: Mainpuri
- Tehsil: Karhal

Area
  - Total: 16.891 km^{2} (6.522 sq mi)

Population (2011)
  - Total: 9,014
  - Density: 533.7/km^{2} (1,382/sq mi)
- Time zone: UTC+5:30 (IST)
- PIN: 205268

Kurra Jarawan (Kurrā Jarāwan) is a village in Karhal block of Mainpuri district, Uttar Pradesh. The village technically encompasses some 25 separate hamlets, which are grouped together for administrative purposes. A market is held in the village twice per week. As of 2011, Kurra Jarawan has a total population of 9,014, in 1,568 households.

== Name ==
The village is called both "Kurra Jarawan" and just "Kurra".

== Geography ==
Kurra Jarawan is located on the main road between Kishni and Karhal, about 16 km from Karhal. A branch of the Etawah Canal passes by the village; there is also a prominent jhil on village lands. The village lands cover 4,109 acres, or about 16.6 square kilometres. 25 distinct settlements of various sizes exist within this area; they are all grouped together into a single village unit (or mauza) for administrative purposes.

=== Land use ===
According to the 2011 census, Kurra Jarawan has a total area of 1,689.1 hectares, of which 1,249.1 were currently farmland and 112.0 were under non-agricultural use. 120.0 hectares were occupied by orchards, 0 by pastures, 10.7 were classified as cultivable but not currently under any agricultural use, and 0 were classified as non-cultivable. No forests existed on village lands.

== Demographics ==
As of 2011, Kurra Jarawan had a population of 9,014, in 1,568 households. This population was 53.7% male (4,842) and 46.3% female (4,172). The 0-6 age group numbered 1,435 (754 male and 681 female), or 15.9% of the total population. 2,043 residents were members of Scheduled Castes, or 22.7% of the total.

The 1961 census recorded Kurra Jarawan as comprising 25 hamlets, with a total population of 3,511 people (1,733 male and 1,778 female), in 638 households and 267 physical houses. The area of the village was given as 4,109 acres.

As of 1901, Kurra Jarawan had a population of 2,850, with a plurality belonging to the Ahir, Brahman, and Thakur groups. The village comprised "two mahals and 23 hamlets, and it had a police station by that point.

== Economy ==
Kurra Jarawan hosts a market twice per week, on Thursdays and Saturdays. Cattle and grain are among the main commodities bought and sold here. There are not any commercial or cooperative banks in Kurra Jarawan, nor any agricultural credit societies.

== Infrastructure ==
As of 2011, Kurra Jarawan had 7 primary schools and 1 veterinary hospital. Drinking water was provided by hand pump; there were no public toilets. The village had a post office but no public library; there was at least some access to electricity for all purposes. Streets were made of both kachcha and pakka materials. There is also a police station in Kurra Jarawan.
