= Muhammadpur Nagariya =

Village in Uttar Pradesh, India

- Village
- Location in Uttar Pradesh, India
- Coordinates: 26.99179°N 78.94978°E
- Country: India
- State: Uttar Pradesh
- District: Mainpuri
- Tehsil: Karhal

Area
  - Total: 2.67 km^{2} (1.03 sq mi)

Population (2011)
  - Total: 2,631
  - Density: 985/km^{2} (2,550/sq mi)
- Time zone: UTC+5:30 (IST)
- PIN: 205264

Muhammadpur Nagariya (Muhammadpur Nagariyā), also spelled Nagaria, is a village in Karhal block of Mainpuri district, Uttar Pradesh. As of 2011, it has a population of 2,631, in 498 households.

== Demographics ==
As of 2011, Muhammadpur Nagariya had a population of 2,631, in 498 households. This population was 53.6% male (1,410) and 46.4% female (1,221). The 0-6 age group numbered 436 (224 male and 214 female), or 16.6% of the total population. 1,003 residents were members of Scheduled Castes, or 38.1% of the total.

The 1961 census recorded Muhammadpur Nagariya (as "Mohammadpur Najariya") as comprising 3 hamlets, with a total population of 960 people (514 male and 446 female), in 181 households and 158 physical houses. The area of the village was given as 675 acres.

== Infrastructure ==
As of 2011, Muhammadpur Nagariya had 3 primary schools; it did not have any healthcare facilities. Drinking water was provided by well, hand pump, and tube well; there were no public toilets. The village had a post office but no public library; there was at least some access to electricity for all purposes. Streets were made of both kachcha and pakka materials.
