= Dostpur, Mainpuri =

Village in Uttar Pradesh, India

Dostpur
- Village
- Location in Uttar Pradesh, India
- Coordinates: 26.98687°N 78.88378°E
- Country: India
- State: Uttar Pradesh
- District: Mainpuri
- Tehsil: Karhal

Area
  - Total: 1.458 km^{2} (0.563 sq mi)

Population (2011)
  - Total: 864
  - Density: 593/km^{2} (1,530/sq mi)
- Time zone: UTC+5:30 (IST)

Dostpur (Dostpur) is a village in Karhal block of Mainpuri district, Uttar Pradesh, India. As of 2011, it had a population of 864, in 130 households.

== Demographics ==
As of 2011, Dostpur had a population of 864, in 130 households. This population was 55.2% male (477) and 44.8% female (387). The 0-6 age group numbered 128 (58 male and 70 female), or 14.8% of the total population. 310 residents were members of Scheduled Castes, or 35.9% of the total.

The 1981 census recorded Dostpur as having a population of 479 people, in 77 households.

The 1961 census recorded Dostpur as comprising 1 hamlet, with a total population of 310 people (166 male and 144 female), in 63 households and 50 physical houses. The area of the village was given as 362 acres.

== Infrastructure ==
As of 2011, Dostpur had 2 primary schools; it did not have any healthcare facilities. Drinking water was provided by hand pump and tube well; there was at least one public toilet. The village had a post office and public library, as well as at least some access to electricity for all purposes. Streets were made of pakka materials.
