= Nasirpur, Karhal =

Village in Uttar Pradesh, India

Nasirpur
- Village
- Location in Uttar Pradesh, India
- Coordinates: 27.06736°N 79.13146°E
- Country: India
- State: Uttar Pradesh
- District: Mainpuri
- Tehsil: Karhal

Area
  - Total: 1.028 km^{2} (0.397 sq mi)

Population (2011)
  - Total: 558
  - Density: 543/km^{2} (1,410/sq mi)
- Time zone: UTC+5:30 (IST)
- PIN: 205268

Nasirpur is a village in Karhal block of Mainpuri district, Uttar Pradesh. As of 2011, it had a population of 558, in 113 households.

== Demographics ==
As of 2011, Nasirpur had a population of 558, in 113 households. This population was 53.2% male (297) and 46.8% female (261). The 0-6 age group numbered 93 (50 male and 43 female), or 16.7% of the total population. 387 residents were members of Scheduled Castes, or 69.4% of the total.

The 1961 census recorded Nasirpur as comprising 1 hamlet, with a total population of 310 people (168 male and 142 female), in 68 households and 52 physical houses. The area of the village was given as 257 acres.

== Infrastructure ==
As of 2011, Nasirpur had 1 primary school; it did not have any kind of healthcare facility. Drinking water was provided by well and hand pump; there were no public toilets. The village had a post office but no public library; there was at least some access to electricity for all purposes. Streets were made of both kachcha and pakka materials.
