= Kamalpur, Karhal =

Village in Uttar Pradesh, India

Kamalpur
- Village
- Location in Uttar Pradesh, India
- Coordinates: 27.03311°N 79.92946°E
- Country: India
- State: Uttar Pradesh
- District: Mainpuri
- Tehsil: Karhal

Area
  - Total: 2.225 km^{2} (0.859 sq mi)

Population (2011)
  - Total: 698
  - Density: 314/km^{2} (812/sq mi)
- Time zone: UTC+5:30 (IST)

Kamalpur (Kamālpur) is a village in Karhal block of Mainpuri district, Uttar Pradesh, India. As of 2011, it had a population of 698, in 114 households.

== Demographics ==
As of 2011, Kamalpur had a population of 698, in 114 households. This population was 54.6% male (381) and 45.4% female (317). The 0-6 age group numbered 121 (67 male and 54 female), or 17.3% of the total population. 109 residents were members of Scheduled Castes, or 15.6% of the total.

The 1981 census recorded Kamalpur as having a population of 375 people, in 67 households.

The 1961 census recorded Kamalpur as comprising 1 hamlet, with a total population of 260 people (146 male and 114 female), in 42 households and 37 physical houses. The area of the village was given as 574 acres.

== Infrastructure ==
As of 2011, Kamalpur had 1 primary school; it did not have any healthcare facilities. Drinking water was provided by hand pump and tube well; there were no public toilets. The village had no post office or public library; there was at least some access to electricity for all purposes. Streets were made of both kachcha and pakka materials.
