= Harwai =

Village in Uttar Pradesh, India

- Village
- Location in Uttar Pradesh, India
- Coordinates: 27.06137°N 78.93384°E
- Country: India
- State: Uttar Pradesh
- District: Mainpuri
- Tehsil: Karhal

Area
  - Total: 2.696 km^{2} (1.041 sq mi)

Population (2011)
  - Total: 1,088
  - Density: 403.6/km^{2} (1,045/sq mi)
- Time zone: UTC+5:30 (IST)

Harwai (Harwāī) is a village in Karhal block of Mainpuri district, Uttar Pradesh, India. As of 2011, it had a population of 1,088, in 214 households.

== Demographics ==
As of 2011, Harwai had a population of 1,088, in 214 households. This population was 50.1% male (546) and 49.8% female (542). The 0-6 age group numbered 183 (98 male and 85 female), or 16.8% of the total population. 302 residents were members of Scheduled Castes, or 27.8% of the total.

The 1981 census recorded Harwai as having a population of 901 people, in 162 households.

The 1961 census recorded Harwai as comprising 4 hamlets, with a total population of 736 people (387 male and 349 female), in 145 households and 88 physical houses. The area of the village was given as 666 acres, and it was then part of Barnahal block.

== Infrastructure ==
As of 2011, Harwai had 1 primary school; it did not have any healthcare facilities. Drinking water was provided by hand pump; there were no public toilets. The village did not have a post office or public library; there was at least some access to electricity for all purposes. Streets were made of both kachcha and pakka materials.
