= Mamsirpur =

Village in Uttar Pradesh, India

- Village
- Location in Uttar Pradesh, India
- Coordinates: 27.0466°N 78.93378°E
- Country: India
- State: Uttar Pradesh
- District: Mainpuri
- Tehsil: Karhal

Area
  - Total: 1.639 km^{2} (0.633 sq mi)

Population (2011)
  - Total: 1,520
  - Density: 927/km^{2} (2,400/sq mi)
- Time zone: UTC+5:30 (IST)

Mamsirpur is a village in Karhal block of Mainpuri district, Uttar Pradesh. As of 2011, it has a population of 1,520, in 279 households.

== Demographics ==
As of 2011, Mamsirpur had a population of 1,520, in 279 households. This population was 56.0% male (851) and 44.0% female (669). The 0-6 age group numbered 215 (129 male and 86 female), or 14.1% of the total population. 302 residents were members of Scheduled Castes, or 19.9% of the total.

The 1981 census recorded Mamsirpur as having a population of 776 people, in 155 households.

The 1961 census recorded Mamsirpur as comprising 1 hamlet, with a total population of 648 people (343 male and 305 female), in 104 households and 80 physical houses. The area of the village was given as 405 acres.

== Infrastructure ==
As of 2011, Mamsirpur had 1 primary school; it did not have any healthcare facilities. Drinking water was provided by hand pump; there were no public toilets. The village had a post office but no public library; there was at least some access to electricity for all purposes. Streets were made of both kachcha and pakka materials.
