= Ninoli =

Village in Uttar Pradesh, India

- Village
- Location in Uttar Pradesh, India
- Coordinates: 27.06588°N 79.00836°E
- Country: India
- State: Uttar Pradesh
- District: Mainpuri
- Tehsil: Karhal

Area
  - Total: 11.651 km^{2} (4.498 sq mi)

Population (2011)
  - Total: 3,854
  - Density: 330.8/km^{2} (856.7/sq mi)
- Time zone: UTC+5:30 (IST)

Ninoli (Ninolī) is a village in Karhal block of Mainpuri district, Uttar Pradesh. As of 2011, it had a population of 3,854, in 622 households.

== Demographics ==
In 2011, Ninoli had a population of 3,854, in 622 households. This population was 53.2% male (2,051) and 46.8% female (1,803). The 0-6 age group numbered 584 (294 male and 290 female), or 15.2% of the total population. 833 residents were members of Scheduled Castes, or 21.6% of the total.

The 1961 census recorded Ninoli (as "Ninauli") as comprising 13 hamlets, with a total population of 1,477 people (798 male and 679 female), in 260 households and 222 physical houses. The area of the village was given as 2,906 acres.

== Infrastructure ==
As of 2011, Ninoli had 1 primary school; it did not have any kind of healthcare facility. Drinking water was provided by well and hand pump; there were no public toilets. The village had a post office and public library, as well as at least some access to electricity for all purposes. Streets were made of both kachcha and pakka materials.
