= Ahladpur =

Village in Uttar Pradesh, India

- Village
- Location in Uttar Pradesh, India
- Coordinates: 26.97068°N 78.91905°E
- Country: India
- State: Uttar Pradesh
- District: Mainpuri
- Tehsil: Karhal

Area
  - Total: 2.483 km^{2} (0.959 sq mi)

Population (2011)
  - Total: 3,186
  - Density: 1,283/km^{2} (3,323/sq mi)
- Time zone: UTC+5:30 (IST)

Ahladpur (Ahlādpur) is a village in Karhal block of Mainpuri district, Uttar Pradesh, India. As of 2011, it had a population of 3,186, in 516 households.

== Demographics ==
As of 2011, Ahladpur had a population of 3,186, in 516 households. This population was 54.2% male (1,725) and 45.8% female (1,461). The 0-6 age group numbered 387 (212 male and 175 female), or 12.1% of the total population. 86 residents were members of Scheduled Castes, or 2.7% of the total.

The 1981 census recorded Ahladpur as having a population of 2,143 people, in 172 households.

The 1961 census recorded Ahladpur as comprising 3 hamlets, with a total population of 1,699 people (898 male and 801 female), in 301 households and 215 physical houses. The area of the village was given as 614 acres.

== Infrastructure ==
As of 2011, Ahladpur had 1 primary school and 1 veterinary hospital. Drinking water was provided by well, hand pump, and tube well; there were no public toilets. The village had a post office and public library, as well as at least some access to electricity for all purposes. Streets were made of both kachcha and pakka materials.
