= Birsinghpur, Karhal =

Village in Uttar Pradesh, India

Birsinghpur
- Village
- Location in Uttar Pradesh, India
- Coordinates: 27.00063°N 79.09948°E
- Country: India
- State: Uttar Pradesh
- District: Mainpuri
- Tehsil: Karhal

Area
  - Total: 1.516 km^{2} (0.585 sq mi)

Population (2011)
  - Total: 832
  - Density: 549/km^{2} (1,420/sq mi)
- Time zone: UTC+5:30 (IST)
- PIN: 205268

Birsinghpur (Bīrsiṅhpur) is a village in Karhal block of Mainpuri district, Uttar Pradesh. As of 2011, it had a population of 832, in 148 households.

== Demographics ==
As of 2011, Birsinghpur had a population of 832, in 148 households. This population was 56.9% male (473) and 43.1% female (359). The 0-6 age group numbered 116 (69 male and 47 female), or 13.9% of the total population. 204 residents were members of Scheduled Castes, or 24.5% of the total.

The 1961 census recorded Birsinghpur as comprising 2 hamlets, with a total population of 365 people (202 male and 163 female), in 67 households and 54 physical houses. The area of the village was given as 378 acres.

== Infrastructure ==
As of 2011, Ninoli had 1 primary school; it did not have any kind of healthcare facility. Drinking water was provided by tap and hand pump; there were no public toilets. The village had a post office but no public library; there was at least some access to electricity for all purposes. Streets were made of kachcha materials.
