= Amamai =

Village in Uttar Pradesh, India

- Village
- Location in Uttar Pradesh, India
- Coordinates: 26.97611°N 78.88568°E
- Country: India
- State: Uttar Pradesh
- District: Mainpuri
- Tehsil: Karhal

Area
  - Total: 2.490 km^{2} (0.961 sq mi)

Population (2011)
  - Total: 1,008
  - Density: 404.8/km^{2} (1,048/sq mi)
- Time zone: UTC+5:30 (IST)

Amamai (Āmāmaī) is a village in Karhal block of Mainpuri district, Uttar Pradesh. As of 2011, it has a population of 1,008, in 181 households.

== Demographics ==
As of 2011, Amamai had a population of 1,008, in 181 households. This population was 53.7% male (541) and 46.3% female (467). The 0-6 age group numbered 133 (59 male and 74 female), or 13.2% of the total population. 120 residents were members of Scheduled Castes, or 11.9% of the total.

The 1981 census recorded Amamai as having a population of 732 people, in 108 households.

The 1961 census recorded Amamai as comprising 2 hamlets, with a total population of 519 people (282 male and 237 female), in 77 households and 59 physical houses. The area of the village was given as 619 acres.

== Infrastructure ==
As of 2011, Amamai had two primary schools; it did not have any healthcare facilities. Drinking water was provided by well, hand pump, and tube well; there were no public toilets. The village did not have a post office or public library; there was at least some access to electricity for all purposes. Streets were made of both kachcha and pakka materials.
