= Patara, Mainpuri =

Village in Uttar Pradesh, India

Patara
- Village
- Location in Uttar Pradesh, India
- Coordinates: 27.07644°N 79.08144°E
- Country: India
- State: Uttar Pradesh
- District: Mainpuri
- Tehsil: Karhal

Area
  - Total: 2.048 km^{2} (0.791 sq mi)

Population (2011)
  - Total: 9,430
  - Density: 4,600/km^{2} (11,900/sq mi)
- Time zone: UTC+5:30 (IST)

Patara (Paṭārā) is a village in Karhal block of Mainpuri district, Uttar Pradesh, India. As of 2011, it had a population of 9,430, in 1,544 households.

== Geography ==
Patara is located about 13 km northeast of Karhal.

== History ==
At the turn of the 20th century, Patara was described as having a population of 4,075 (as per the 1901 census), distributed across 8 distinct sites. The village held markets twice per week. Once per year was the Barnath fair, named after a local Bairagi holy man named Barnath; during the fair, people would venerate him and make offerings in his honour. Merchants came to the village from Mainpuri and Etawah for the occasion. The village was then part of pargana Karhal.

== Demographics ==
As of 2011, Patara had a population of 9,430, in 1,544 households. This population was 52.8% male (4,979) and 47.2% female (4,451). The 0-6 age group numbered 1,540 (839 male and 701 female), or 16.3% of the total population. 1,697 residents were members of Scheduled Castes, or 18.0% of the total.

The 1961 census recorded Patara as comprising 17 hamlets, with a total population of 4,657 people (2,489 male and 2,168 female), in 837 households and 689 physical houses. The area of the village was given as 5,122 acres and it had a post office at that point.

== Infrastructure ==
As of 2011, Patara had 4 primary schools and 1 maternity and child welfare centre. Drinking water was provided by well, hand pump, and tube well; there were no public toilets. The village had a post office but no public library; there was at least some access to electricity for all purposes. Streets were made of both kachcha and pakka materials.
