= Patara (Cappadocia) =

Small ancient city in Cappadocia or Lesser Armenia

Coordinates: 40°32′38″N 39°38′54″E

Patara (Ancient Greek: Πάταρα) was a small ancient city in ancient Cappadocia or Lesser Armenia, (Tab. Peut.), later in Pontus. The city lay on the major trade road from Trapezus on the Black Sea to Satala, and thence to Lake Van.

== Background ==
Its site is located near Madenhanları, Asiatic Turkey.
