= Patara (Lycia) =

Lycian settlement on the Mediterranean coast of Turkey

Coordinates: 36°15′58.38″N 29°19′2.0″E

- Patara (Turkish)
- Arsinoe
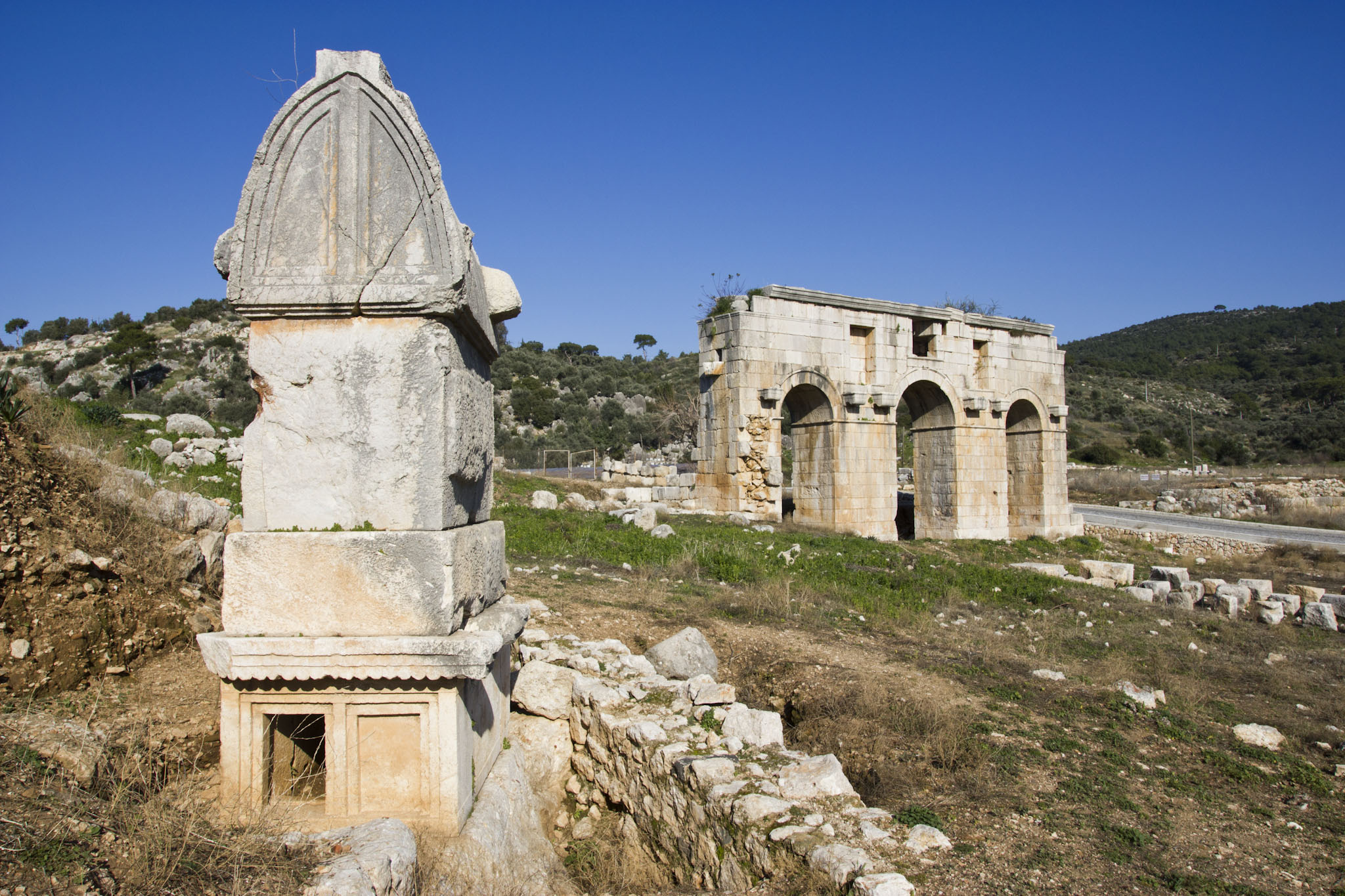
- The north gate and nearby tombs
- Interactive map of Patara
- Type: Settlement
- Location: Gelemiş, Antalya Province, Turkey
- Region: Lycia

Site notes
- Owner: Public
- Public access: Yes
- Website: turkishmuseums.com

Patara (Turkish: Patara, Lycian: 𐊓𐊗𐊗𐊀𐊕𐊀, Pttara; Greek: Πάταρα) was an ancient and flourishing maritime and commercial city that was for a period the capital of Lycia. The site is located on the Turkish coast near to the village of Gelemiş, in Antalya Province.

Saint Nicholas was born in the town in 270, and lived most of his life in the nearby town of Myra.

Only part of the site has been excavated and renovated. The protection and archaeology of the site have been subject to battles between archaeologists and illegal developers.

== History ==
=== Antiquity ===
Patara was referred to as Patar in Hittite texts: "King Tudhaliya IV (1236-1210 BC), after the Lukka expedition, came to this city with his army and made offerings."

The city was said to have been founded by Patarus (Greek: Πάταρος), a son of Apollo. It was noted during antiquity for the temple and oracle of Apollo, second only in importance to that of Delphi. The god is often given the surname Patareus. Herodotus says that the oracle of Apollo was delivered by a priestess only during a certain period of the year, and Servius mentions that this period was the six winter months. It seems certain that Patara received Dorian settlers from Crete; and the worship of Apollo was certainly Dorian.

Ancient writers mentioned Patara as one of the principal cities of Lycia. It was Lycia's primary seaport, and a leading city of the Lycian League, having 3 votes, the maximum.

The city, with the rest of Lycia, surrendered to Alexander the Great in 333 BC. During the Wars of the Diadochi, it was occupied in turn by Antigonus and Demetrius, before finally falling to the Ptolemies. In this period the first city walls were built. Strabo informs us that Ptolemy Philadelphus of Egypt, who enlarged the city, gave it the name of Arsinoë after Arsinoe II of Egypt, his wife and sister, but it continued to be called by its ancient name, Patara. Antiochus III captured Patara in 196 BC and it became the capital of Lycia. The Lycian League was formally established in 176 BC.

The Rhodians occupied the city and as a Roman ally, the city with the rest of Lycia was granted autonomy in 167 BC. In 88 BC, the city suffered siege by Mithridates VI, king of Pontus and was captured by Brutus and Cassius, during their campaign against Mark Antony and Augustus. It was spared the massacres that were inflicted on nearby Xanthos. Patara was formally annexed by the Roman Empire in 43 AD and attached to Pamphylia.

Patara is mentioned in the New Testament as the place where Paul of Tarsus and Luke changed ships. The city was Christianized early, and several early bishops are known; according to Le Quien, they include:

- Methodius, dubious, more probably bishop of Olympus
- Eudemus, present at the Council of Nicaea (325)
- Eutychianus, at the Council of Seleucia (359)
- Eudemus, at the Council of Constantinople (381)
- Cyrinus, at the Council of Chalcedon (451)
- Licinius, at the Council of Constantinople (536)
- Theodulus, at the Council of Constantinople (879-880)

Saints Leo and Paregorius were martyred at Patara around 260 AD. Nicholas of Myra was born at Patara around March 15, 270 AD.

In the 5th century AD the city was reduced in size through the construction of a strong fortification wall adjoining the Bouleuterion using stone from the nearby structures.

=== Middle Ages ===
Patara is mentioned among the Lycian bishoprics in the Acts of Councils (Hierocl. p. 684). The Notitiae Episcopatuum mention it among the suffragans of Myra as late as the thirteenth century.

The city remained of some importance during the Byzantine Empire as a way-point for trade and pilgrims. It was sacked by the Seljuks, reconquered by the Komnenian dynasty, and later taken by the Sultanate of Rum in 1211, after which Patara declined and appears to have been deserted by 1340.

With the demise of the bishopric as a residential see, Patara became a titular see and is included as in the Catholic Church's list of such sees.

It was one of the four largest settlements in the Xanthos Valley and the only one open to the sea, situated 60 stadia to the southeast of the mouth of the river.

== Archaeology ==
In 1836 the French archaeologist Charles Texier explored the site followed by Charles Fellows in 1838.

Excavations were begun in 1988 and only in 1991 was the Bouleuterion recognised.

In 1993 the Stadiasmus Patarensis was unearthed, a monumental Roman pillar on which is inscribed in Greek a dedication to Claudius and an official announcement of roads being built by the governor, Quintus Veranius Nepos, in the province of Lycia et Pamphylia, giving place names and distances, essentially a monumental public itinerarium. The pillar is on display in the garden of the Antalya Museum.

The site is currently being excavated each year by a team of Turkish archaeologists. At the end of 2007, all the sand had been cleared from the theatre and some other buildings, and the columns on the main street had been partially re-erected (with facsimile capitals). The excavations revealed masonry in remarkable condition.

In 2020 several discoveries were made:

- a 10th statue of a woman from the theatre.
- a kitchen and a "women's room", with mirrors, ornaments and fragrance pots, from the 4th c. BC. These rooms, known as gynaeconitis, were located away from the residence's entrance in order to minimise contact with men from outside the family, and were where women nursed their children, wove thread and wool
- a cylindrical ancient Greek altar carved with a coiled snake.

The site of the oracle and temple of Apollo have not been found.

== Description ==
=== Location ===
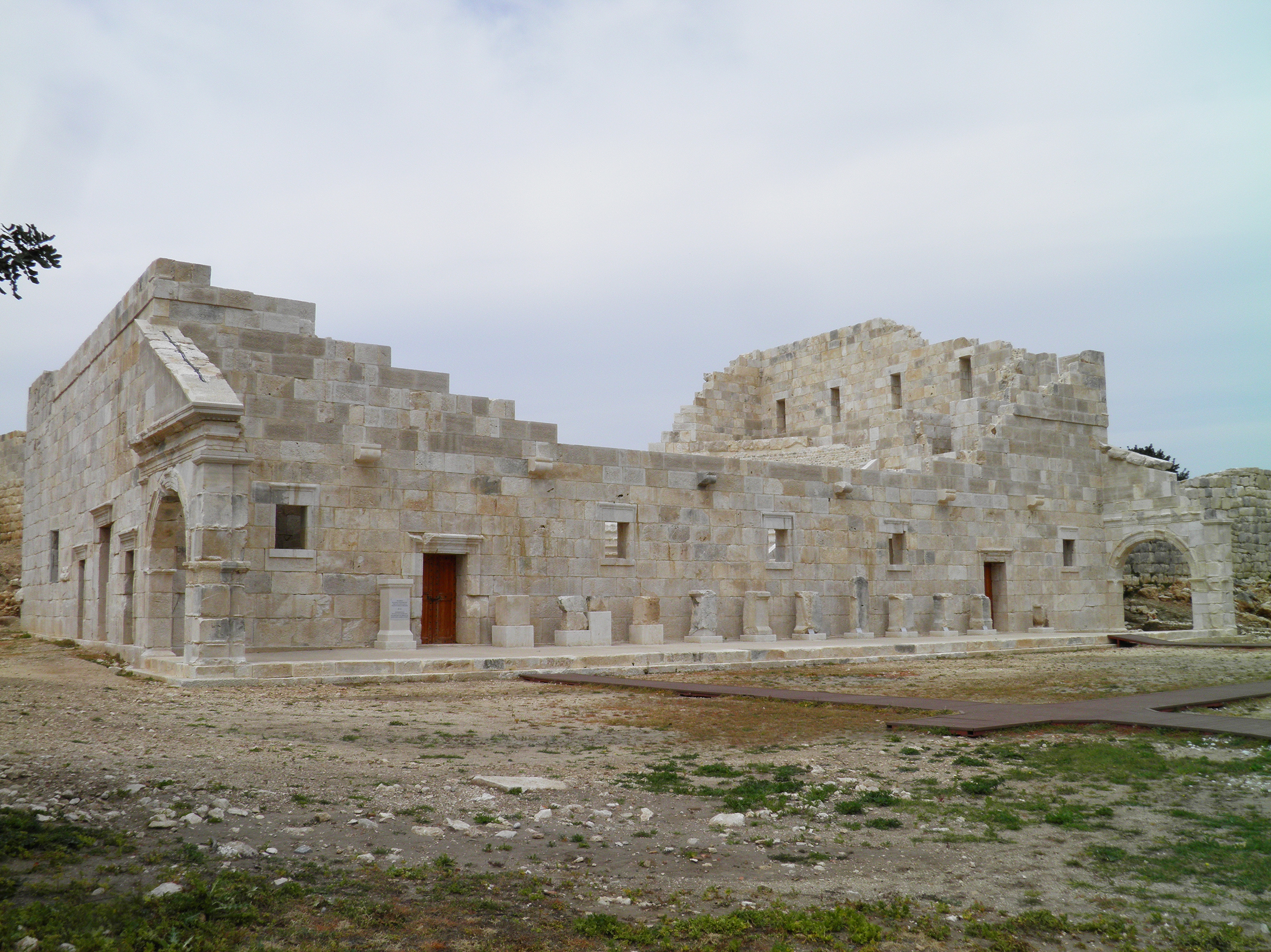
Council Chamber (Bouleuterion), Patara

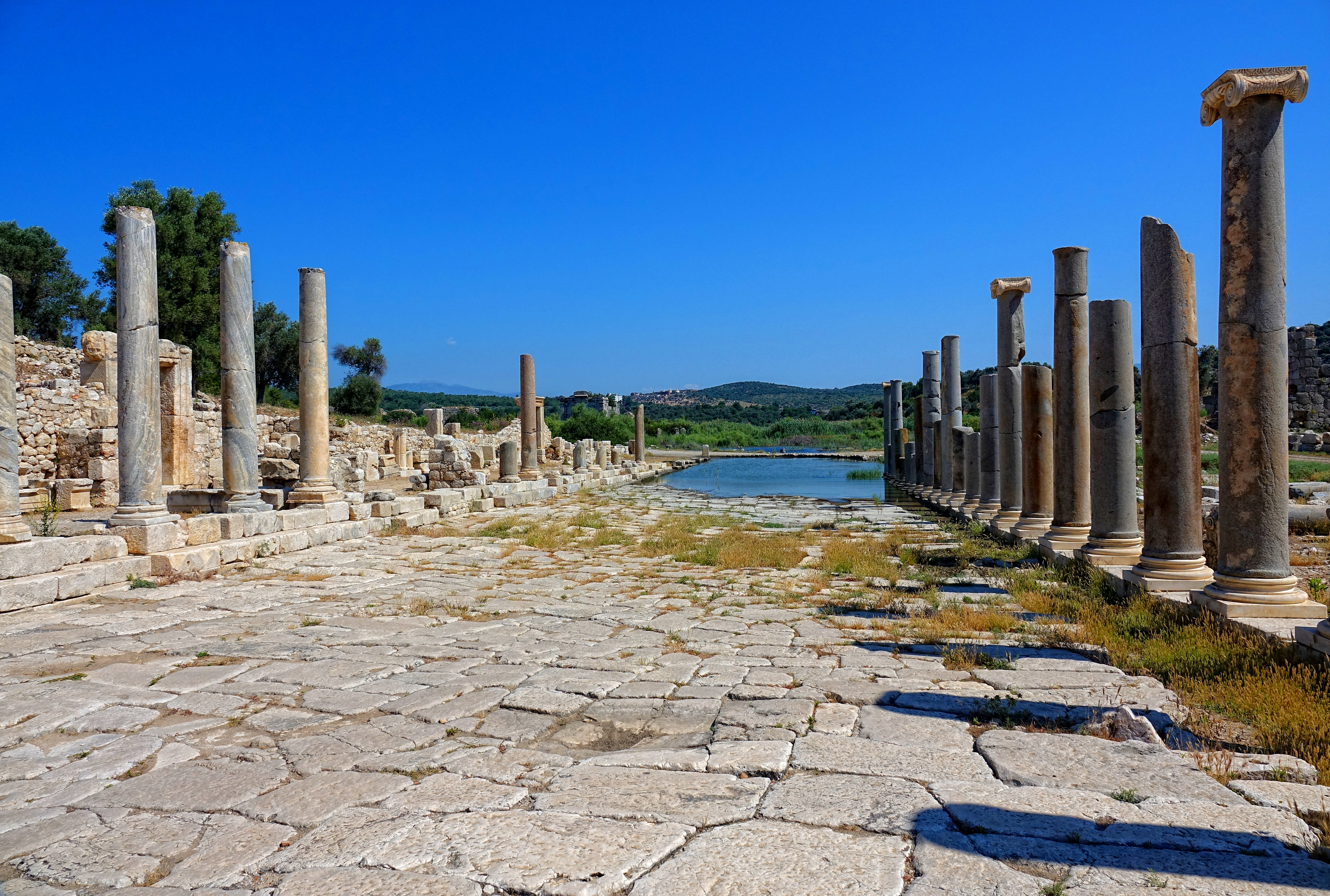
The partially restored main street of Patara

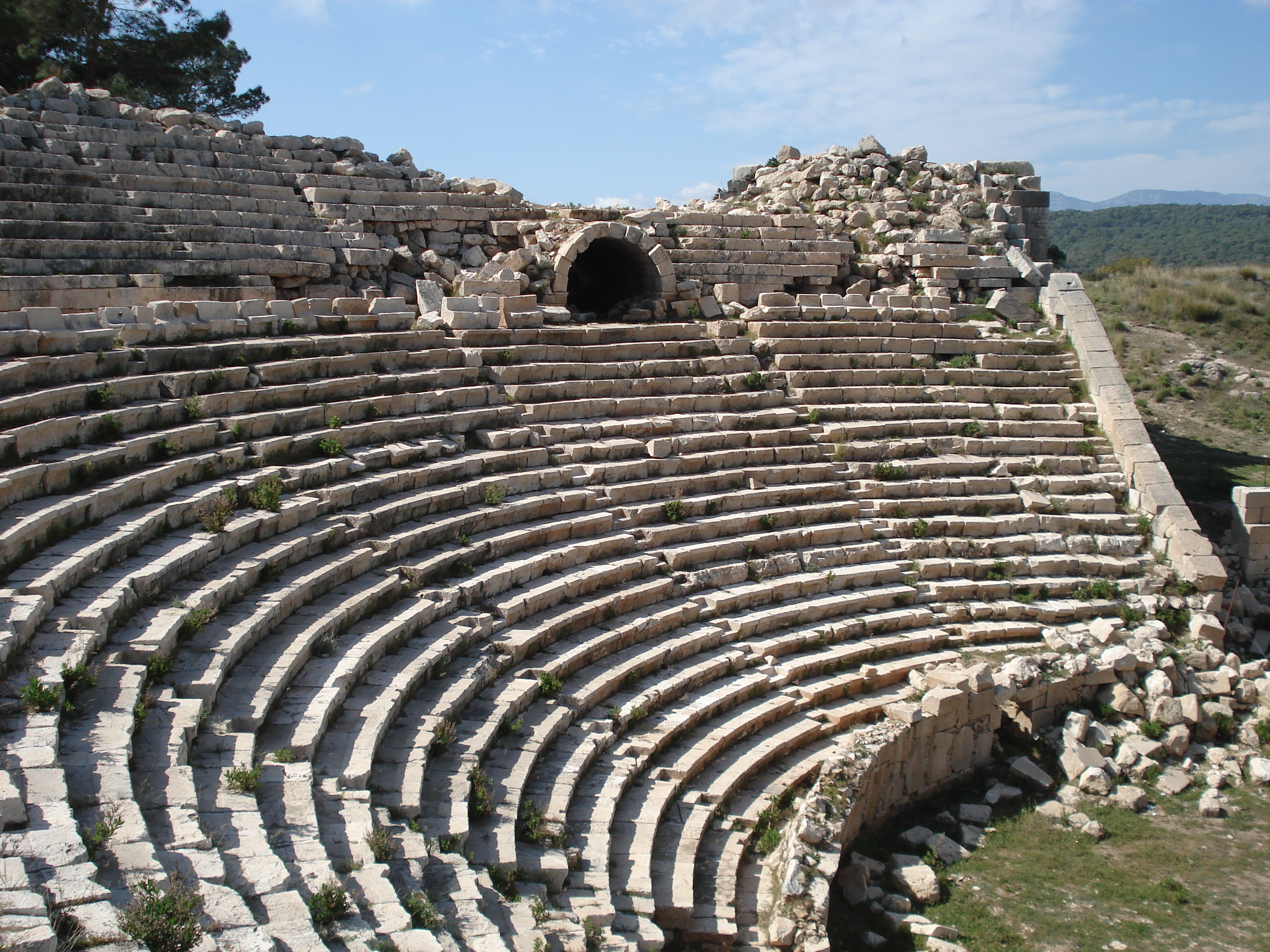
Roman Theatre

The site is a plain surrounded by hills and included in ancient times a large natural harbour, since silted up. Northeast of the harbour is Tepecik Hill upon which there is a Bronze Age site and which was the acropolis on which the city was founded. The city later spread to the south and west of the hill.

=== Monuments ===
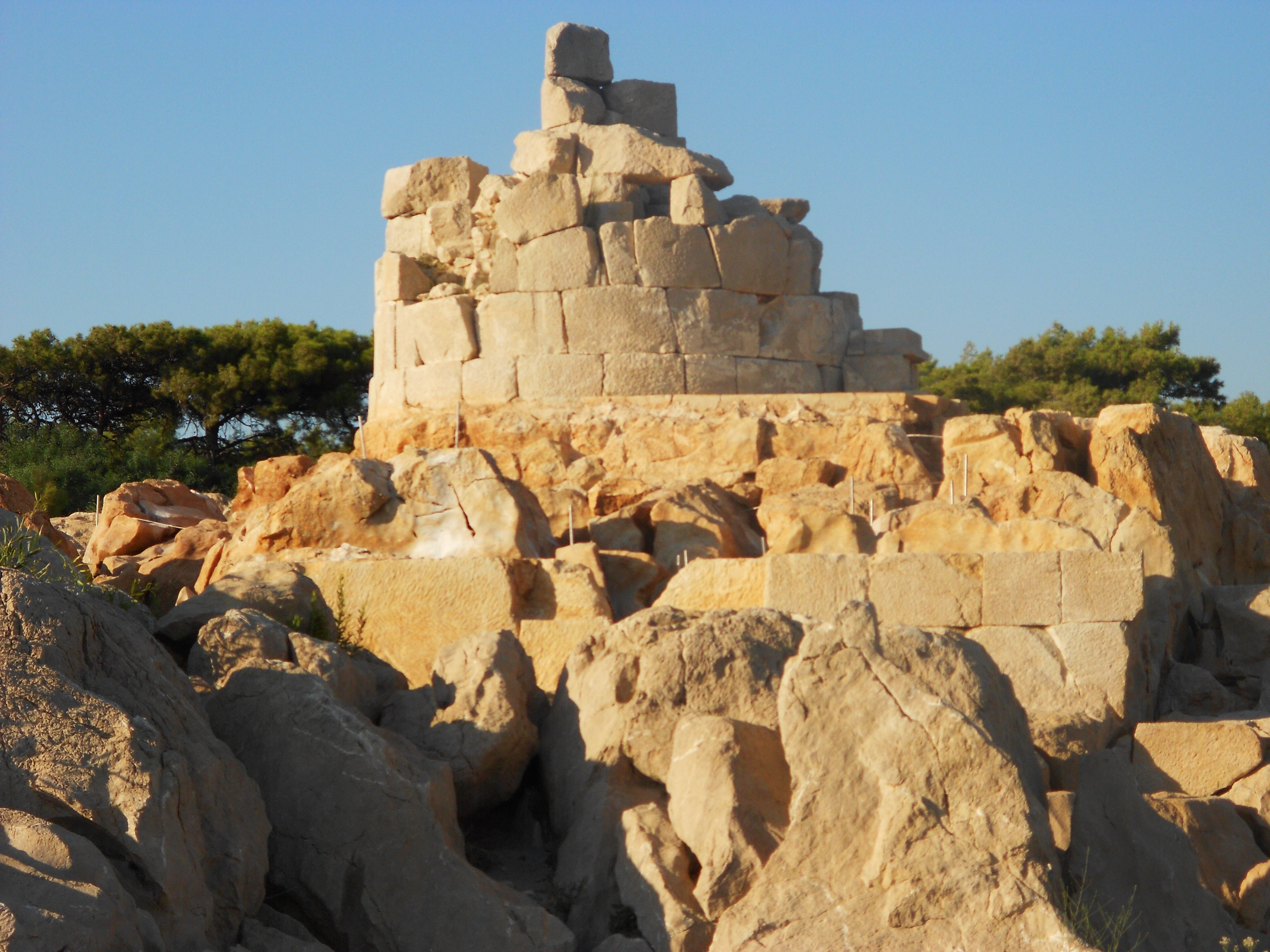
The Lighthouse

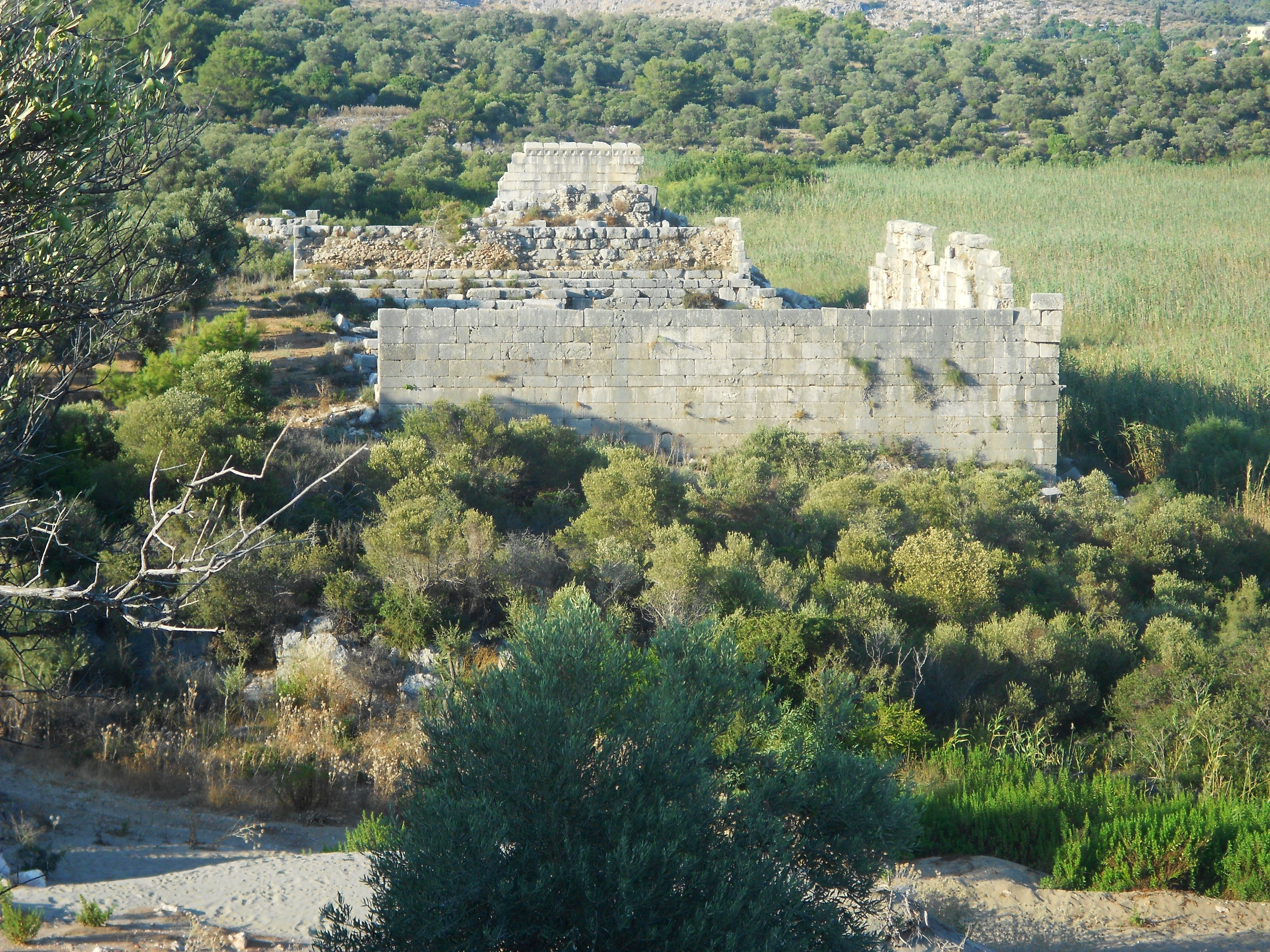
Hadrian's granary

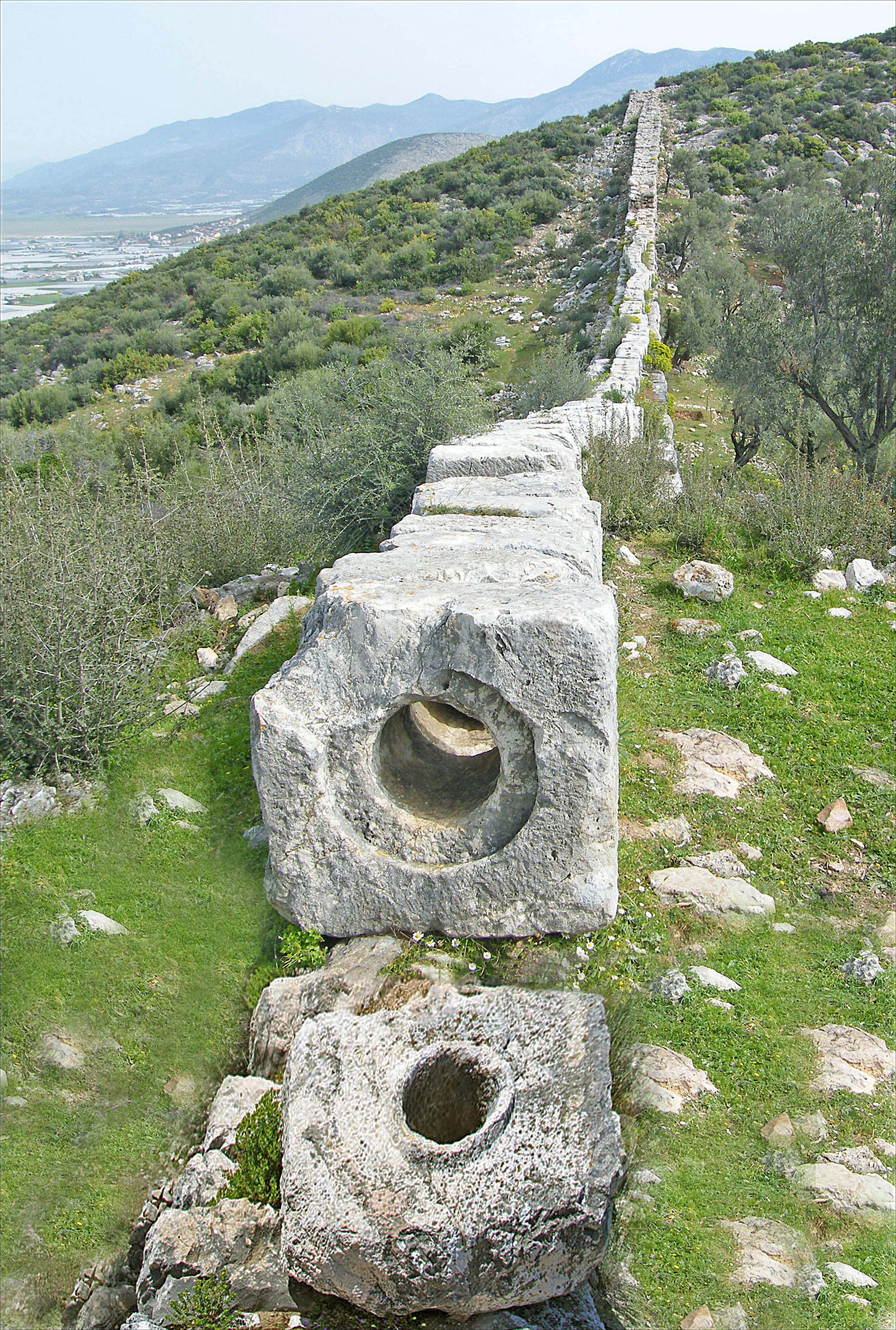
Aqueduct siphon made of stone pipes

The theatre was rebuilt under Antoninus Pius in 147 AD after an earthquake; its diameter is 265 feet, and held about 6000 spectators.

The Bouleuterion or prytaneion is well-preserved and has been further restored. It was the capital's assembly hall of the Lycian League and overlooked the theatre the Agora in the East. It was constructed in the early 1st century BC and held about 1400 people. In the centre of the cavea is a tribunalia, seats reserved for governors. The first alterations, when the cavea was enlarged and the semicircular wall in the west was connected to the northern and southern walls, are linked to the annexation of Lycia as a Roman province, most probably under Claudius (r. 43-51 AD) or Nero (r. 51–69). After a major earthquake in 142/143 AD a stoa was added outside and a stage building inside, as it was also to be used as a concert hall (Odeion). In the 5th c. AD it was incorporated into the new fortification wall as a bastion.

The main street connected the inner harbour to the Agora and is one of the widest and best-preserved streets in Lycia. Both sides of the street are lined with Ionic-order colonnades, with granite columns on the east and marble columns on the west.

The well-preserved Arch of Medustus is the north gate of the city and a magnificent triple vaulted triumphal arch built by the citizens of Patara in about 100 AD in honour of Mettias Medustus, the Governor of Lycia.

Several baths are known; the harbour (or datepalm) baths, the Vespasian (or Nero) baths, central baths, small baths and Byzantine baths.

The lighthouse stood at the entrance to the major naval and trading port of Lycia, which had an outer and an inner harbour. It was built in 60 AD during the reign of Nero, according to an inscription, and is one of the oldest surviving. It has a unique structure rising 26 m on a magnificent 3-tiered square base.

Hadrian's Granary, so-named as it was built during his visit in 131 AD, lies on the side of the ancient harbour for storage of cereals and other goods to be shipped to Rome. It is 75m x 25m and was divided into 8 sections.

Parts of the site have been subject to illegal construction for agriculture, hotels and holiday villages despite legal protection, and destruction and vandalism are continuing problems.

The harbour is still apparent but it is a swamp, choked up with sand and bushes.

The aqueduct, which was built under Claudius and renovated under Vespasian after an earthquake, was 22.5 km long. It comprised five bridges as well as a rare inverted siphon or pressurised pipeline which is still largely intact. The siphon avoided the construction of tall expensive arches across a valley to support an open channel but instead had the problem of containing the water pressure in the siphon in an era when large diameter piping was difficult to make and seal. The pipes were carved from marble blocks with internal diameter of 0.28 m, each weighing up to 900 kg, laid on top of a 200 m long, 10 m high wall across an 18 m deep valley.

== Sources ==
- Smith, William (1870). Dictionary of Greek and Roman Geography. Boston: Little, Brown. OCLC 847907716.
