= Dostpur (disambiguation) =

Dostpur is a town in Uttar Pradesh, India.

Dostpur may also refer to:

- Dostpur, Bachhrawan, a village in Raebareli district, Uttar Pradesh
- Dostpur, Lalganj, a village in Raebareli district, Uttar Pradesh
- Dostpur, Mainpuri, a village in Mainpuri district, Uttar Pradesh
