= Ashan =

Ashan may refer to:

== Places ==
- Ashan, Nagorno-Karabakh, a village in Martuni Province, Artsakh
- Ashan, Iran, a village in East Azerbaijan Province, Iran
- Ashan, Isfahan, a village in Isfahan Province, Iran
- Ashan Rural District, in Isfahan Province, Iran
- Ashan Jagatpur, a village in Uttar Pradesh, India

== People ==
- Damidu Ashan (born 1995), Sri Lankan cricketer
- Shammu Ashan (born 1998), Sri Lankan cricketer
- Ashan Fernando (born 1982), Sri Lankan cricketer
- Ashan Holgate (born 1986), footballer
- Ashan Pillai (born 1969), British violist
- Ashan Priyanjan (born 1989), professional Sri Lankan cricketer
- Ashan Randika (born 1993), Sri Lankan cricketer

== Other uses ==
- Ashan, a planet in the Ubisoft continuity of the fictional Might and Magic universe

== See also ==
- Ashani (disambiguation)
- Auchan, a French supermarket chain
