= Dundgarh =

- Village
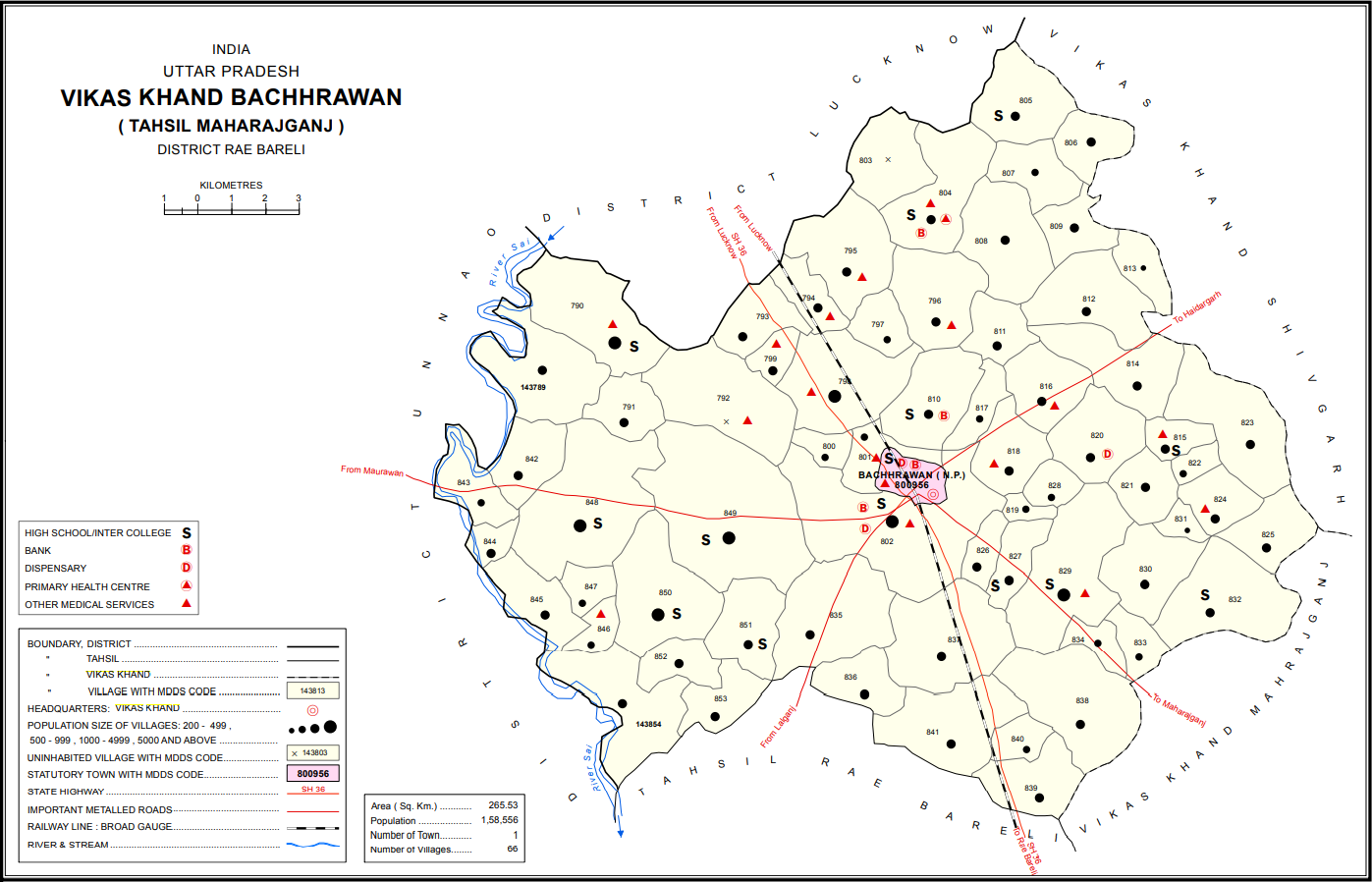
- Map showing Dundgarh (#809) in Bachhrawan CD block

- Location in Uttar Pradesh, India
- Coordinates: 26.535489°N 81.151971°E
- Country India: India
- State: Uttar Pradesh
- District: Raebareli

Area
  - Total: 2.412 km^{2} (0.931 sq mi)

Population (2011)
  - Total: 1,397
  - Density: 579.2/km^{2} (1,500/sq mi)

Languages
  - Official: Hindi
- Time zone: UTC+5:30 (IST)
- Vehicle registration: UP-35

Dundgarh is a village in Bachhrawan block of Rae Bareli district, Uttar Pradesh, India. As of 2011, its population is 1,397, in 270 households. It has one primary school and no healthcare facilities.

The 1961 census recorded Dundgarh as comprising 2 hamlets, with a total population of 626 people (320 male and 306 female), in 139 households and 127 physical houses. The area of the village was given as 608 acres.

The 1981 census recorded Dundgarh as having a population of 813 people, in 173 households, and having an area of 248.88 hectares.
