= Kalui Khera =

- Village
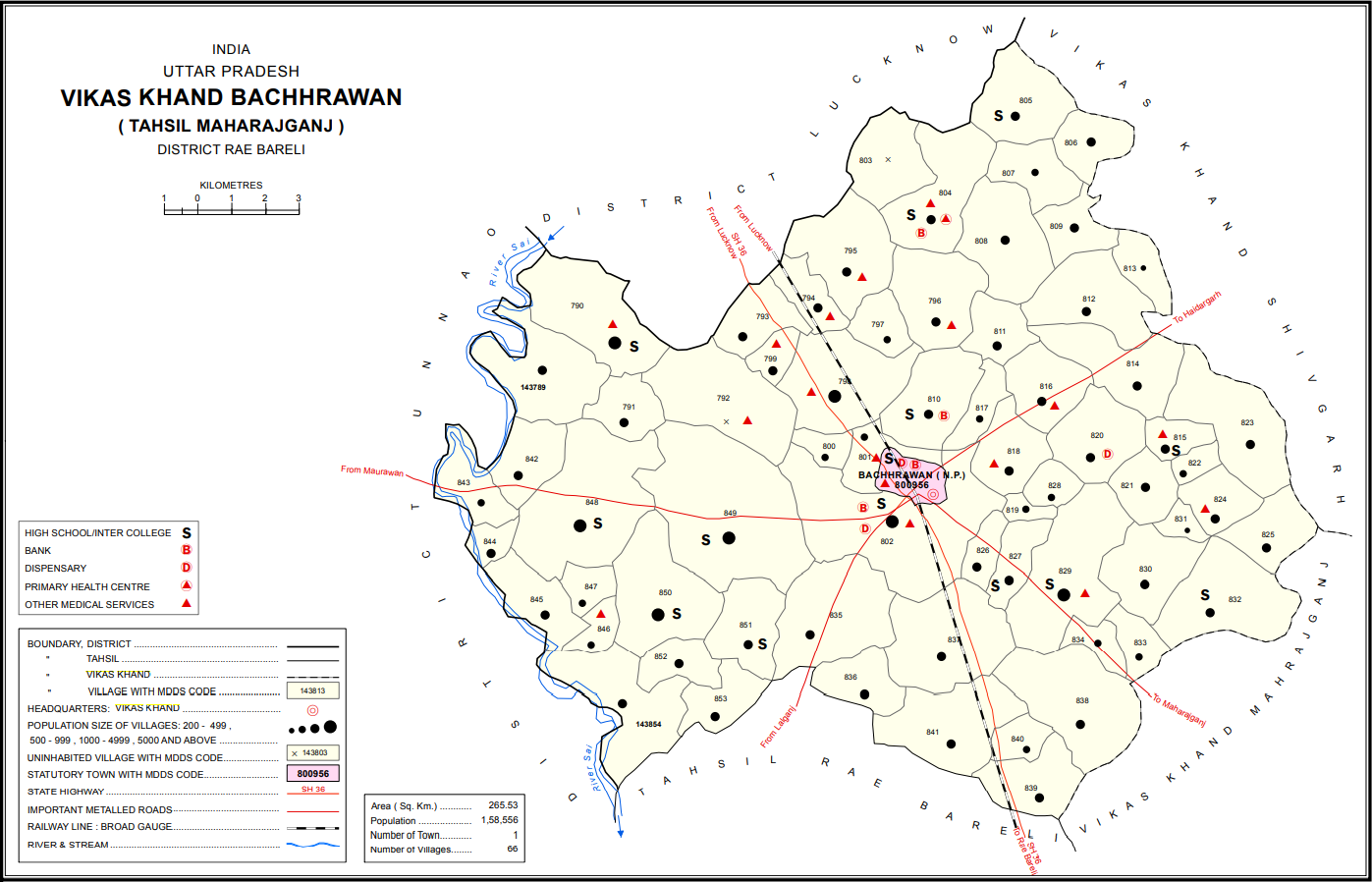
- Map showing Kalui Khera (#852) in Bachhrawan CD block

- Location in Uttar Pradesh, India
- Coordinates: 26.421807°N 81.058582°E
- Country India: India
- State: Uttar Pradesh
- District: Raebareli

Area
  - Total: 2.96 km^{2} (1.14 sq mi)

Population (2011)
  - Total: 1,734
  - Density: 586/km^{2} (1,520/sq mi)

Languages
  - Official: Hindi
- Time zone: UTC+5:30 (IST)
- Vehicle registration: UP-35

Kalui Khera is a village in Bachhrawan block of Rae Bareli district, Uttar Pradesh, India. As of 2011, its population is 1,734, in 342 households. It is located ten km from Bachhrawan, the block headquarters, and the main staple foods are wheat and rice. It has one primary school and no healthcare facilities.

The 1961 census recorded Kalui Khera as comprising two hamlets, with a total population of 672 people (372 male and 300 female), in 154 households and 142 physical houses. The area of the village was given as 775 acres.

The 1981 census recorded Kalui Khera as having a population of 1,001 people, in 210 households, and having an area of 320.11 hectares.
