= Kundauli =

Village in Uttar Pradesh, India

- Village
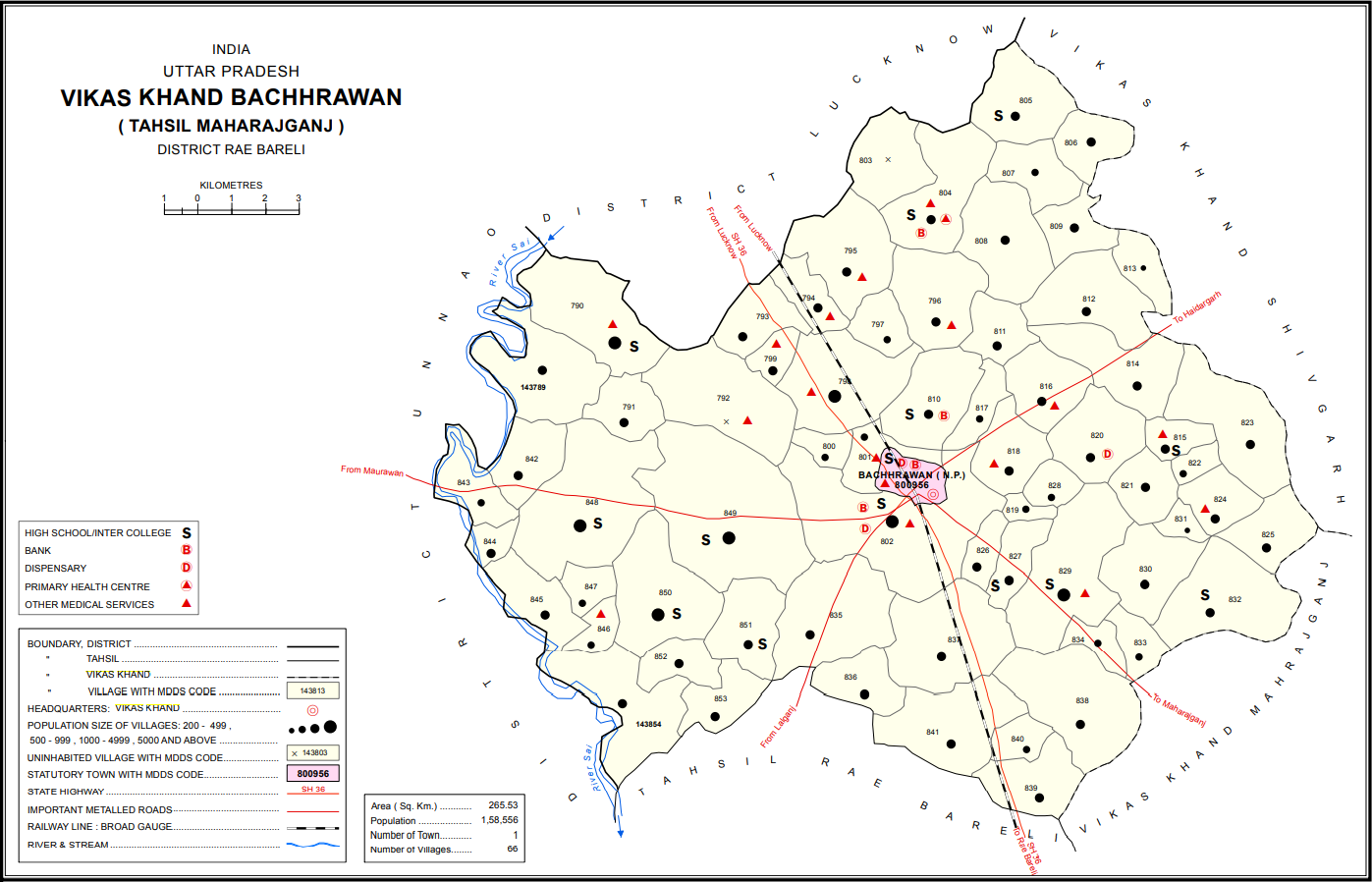
- Map showing Kundauli (#796) in Bachhrawan CD block

- Location in Uttar Pradesh, India
- Coordinates: 26.515042°N 81.112726°E
- Country India: India
- State: Uttar Pradesh
- District: Raebareli

Area
  - Total: 5.367 km^{2} (2.072 sq mi)

Population (2011)
  - Total: 3,183
  - Density: 593.1/km^{2} (1,536/sq mi)

Languages
  - Official: Hindi
- Time zone: UTC+5:30 (IST)
- Vehicle registration: UP-35

Kundauli is a village in Bachhrawan block of Rae Bareli district, Uttar Pradesh, India. It is located 5 km from Bachhrawan, the block headquarters, and the main staple foods are wheat and rice. As of 2011, its population is 3,183, in 683 households.

The 1961 census recorded Kundauli as comprising 13 hamlets, with a total population of 1,224 people (623 male and 601 female), in 300 households and 265 physical houses. The area of the village was given as 1,368 acres.

The 1981 census recorded Kundauli as having a population of 1,705 people, in 503 households, and having an area of 551.19 hectares.
