= Tilenda =

- Village
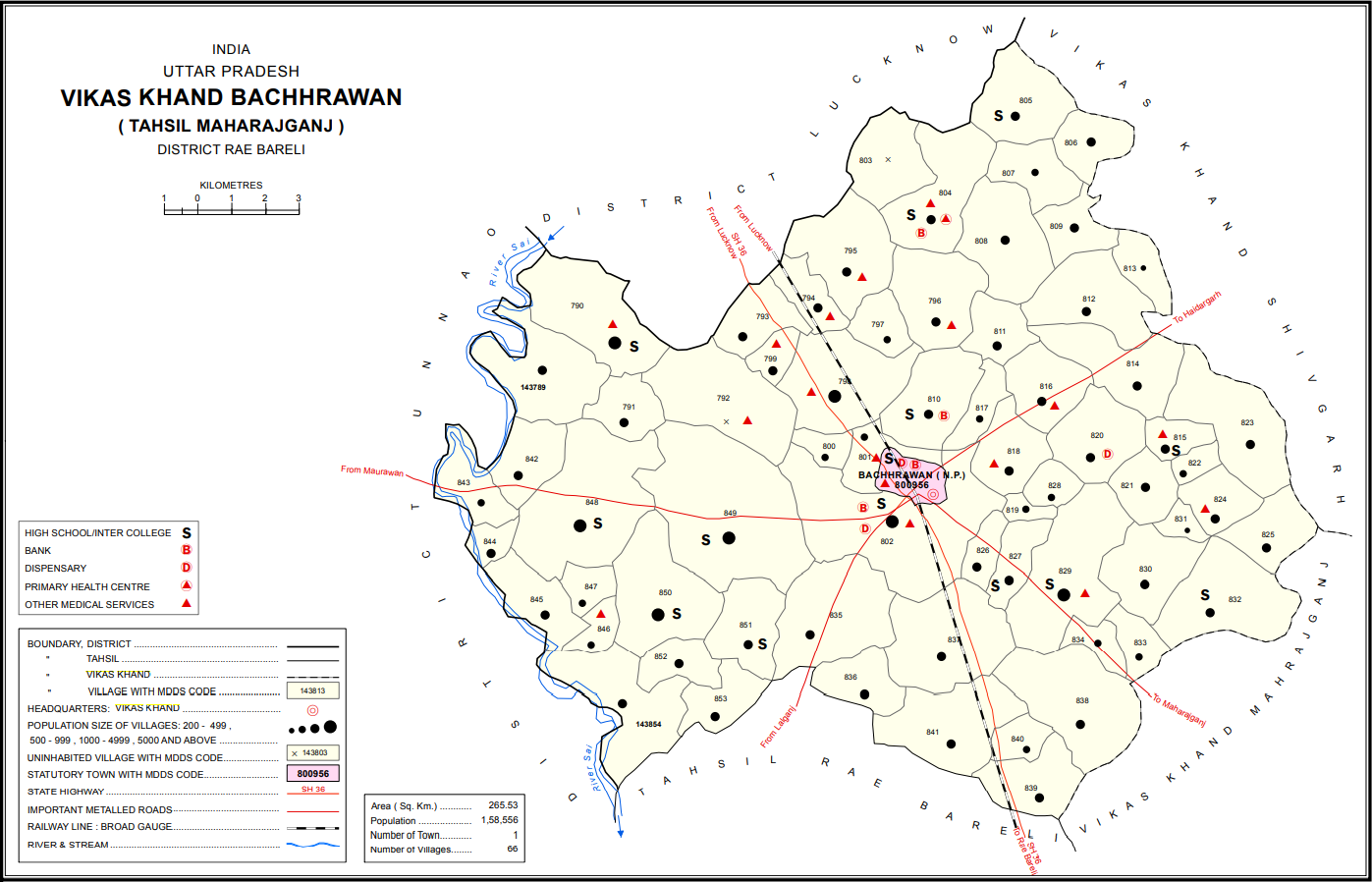
- Map showing Tilenda (#816) in Bachhrawan CD block

- Location in Uttar Pradesh, India
- Coordinates: 26.495516°N 81.146514°E
- Country India: India
- State: Uttar Pradesh
- District: Raebareli

Area
  - Total: 3.692 km^{2} (1.425 sq mi)

Population (2011)
  - Total: 2,414
  - Density: 653.8/km^{2} (1,693/sq mi)

Languages
  - Official: Hindi
- Time zone: UTC+5:30 (IST)
- Vehicle registration: UP-35

Tilenda is a village in Bachhrawan block of Rae Bareli district, Uttar Pradesh, India. It is located 6 km (3.7 mi) from Bachhrawan, the block headquarters, and the main staple foods are wheat and rice. As of 2011, its population is 2,414, in 475 households.

The 1961 census recorded Tilenda as comprising 11 hamlets, with a total population of 1,015 people (525 male and 490 female), in 226 households and 197 physical houses. The area of the village was given as 911 acres.

The 1981 census recorded Tilenda as having a population of 1,333 people, in 280 households, and having an area of 369.08 hectares.
