= Umarpur, Bachhrawan =

Umarpur
- Village
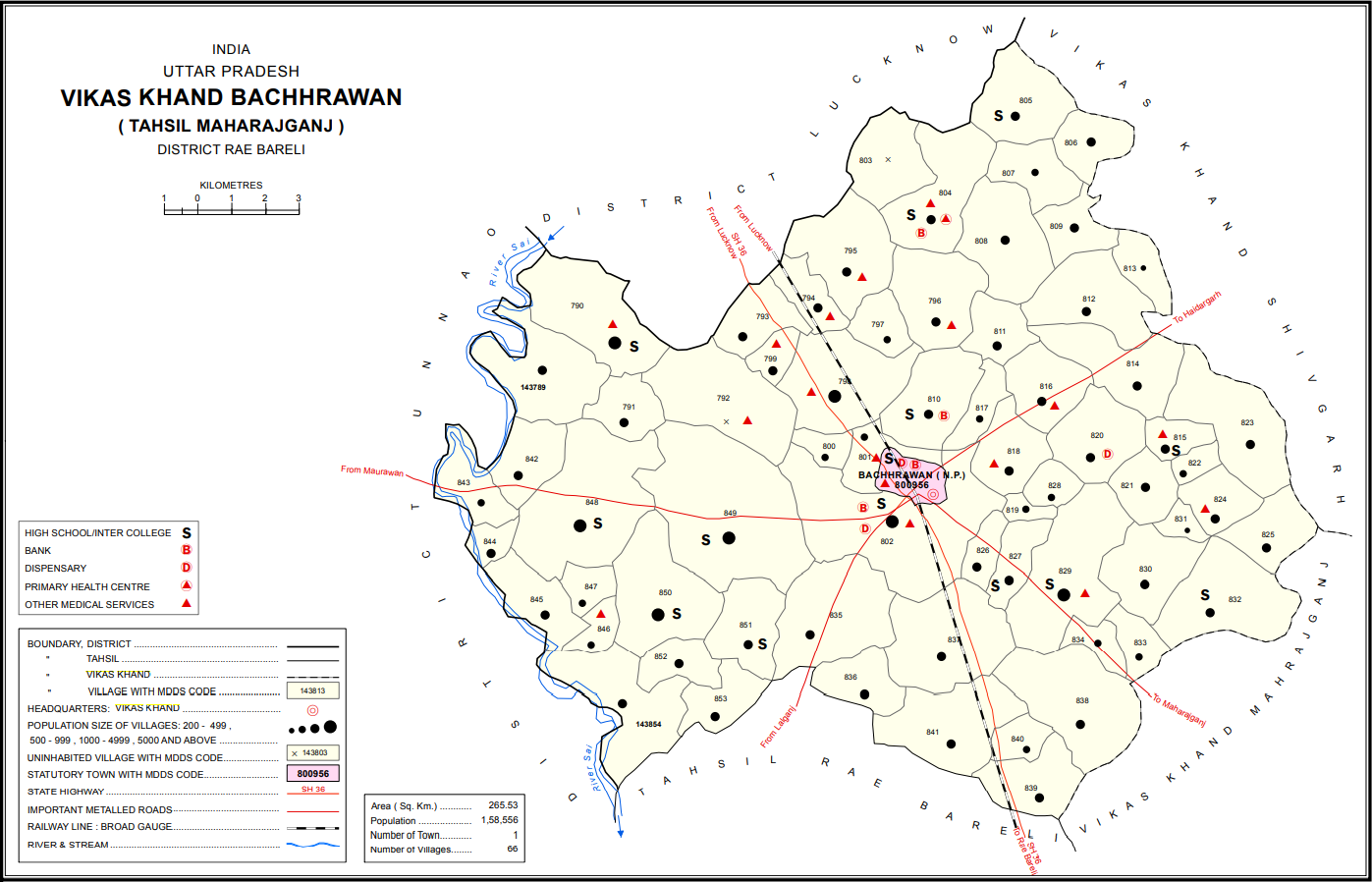
- Map showing Umarpur (#838) in Bachhrawan CD block

- Location in Uttar Pradesh, India
- Coordinates: 26.421558°N 81.157481°E
- Country India: India
- State: Uttar Pradesh
- District: Raebareli

Area
  - Total: 7.376 km^{2} (2.848 sq mi)

Population (2011)
  - Total: 2,333
  - Density: 316.3/km^{2} (819.2/sq mi)

Languages
  - Official: Hindi
- Time zone: UTC+5:30 (IST)
- Vehicle registration: UP-35

Umarpur is a village in Bachhrawan block of Rae Bareli district, Uttar Pradesh, India. As of 2011, its population is 2,333, in 395 households. It is located 8 km from Bachhrawan, the block headquarters, and the main staple foods are wheat and rice. It has one primary school and no healthcare facilities.

The 1961 census recorded Umarpur as comprising 5 hamlets, with a total population of 940 people (472 male and 468 female), in 213 households and 206 physical houses. The area of the village was given as 1,822 acres.

The 1981 census recorded Umarpur as having a population of 1,210 people, in 255 households, and having an area of 545.12 hectares.
