= Ichauli =

- Village
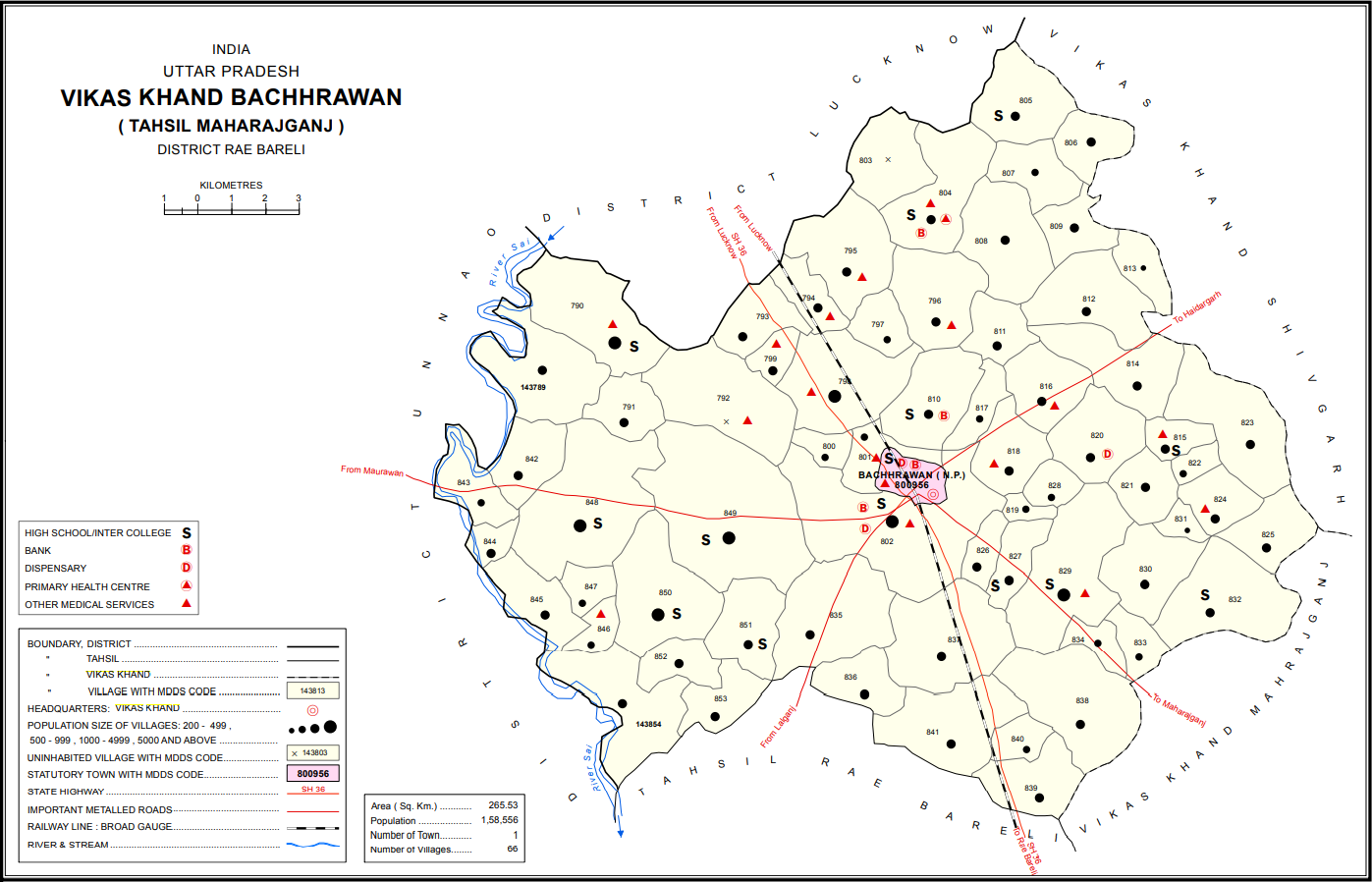
- Map showing Ichauli (#848) in Bachhrawan CD block

- Location in Uttar Pradesh, India
- Coordinates: 26.464727°N 81.018946°E
- Country India: India
- State: Uttar Pradesh
- District: Raebareli

Area
  - Total: 10.545 km^{2} (4.071 sq mi)

Population (2011)
  - Total: 6,977
  - Density: 661.6/km^{2} (1,714/sq mi)

Languages
  - Official: Hindi
- Time zone: UTC+5:30 (IST)
- Vehicle registration: UP-35

Ichauli is a village in Bachhrawan block of Rae Bareli district, Uttar Pradesh, India. As of 2011, its population is 6,977, in 1,317 households. It is located 10 km from Bachhrawan, the block headquarters, and the main staple foods are wheat and rice. It has 7 primary schools and no healthcare facilities.

The 1961 census recorded Ichauli as comprising 12 hamlets, with a total population of 2,528 people (1,296 male and 1,232 female), in 498 households and 453 physical houses. The area of the village was given as 2,469 acres.

The 1981 census recorded Ichauli as having a population of 3,958 people, in 748 households, and having an area of 1,024.66 hectares.
