= Karanpur, Raebareli =

Karanpur
- Village
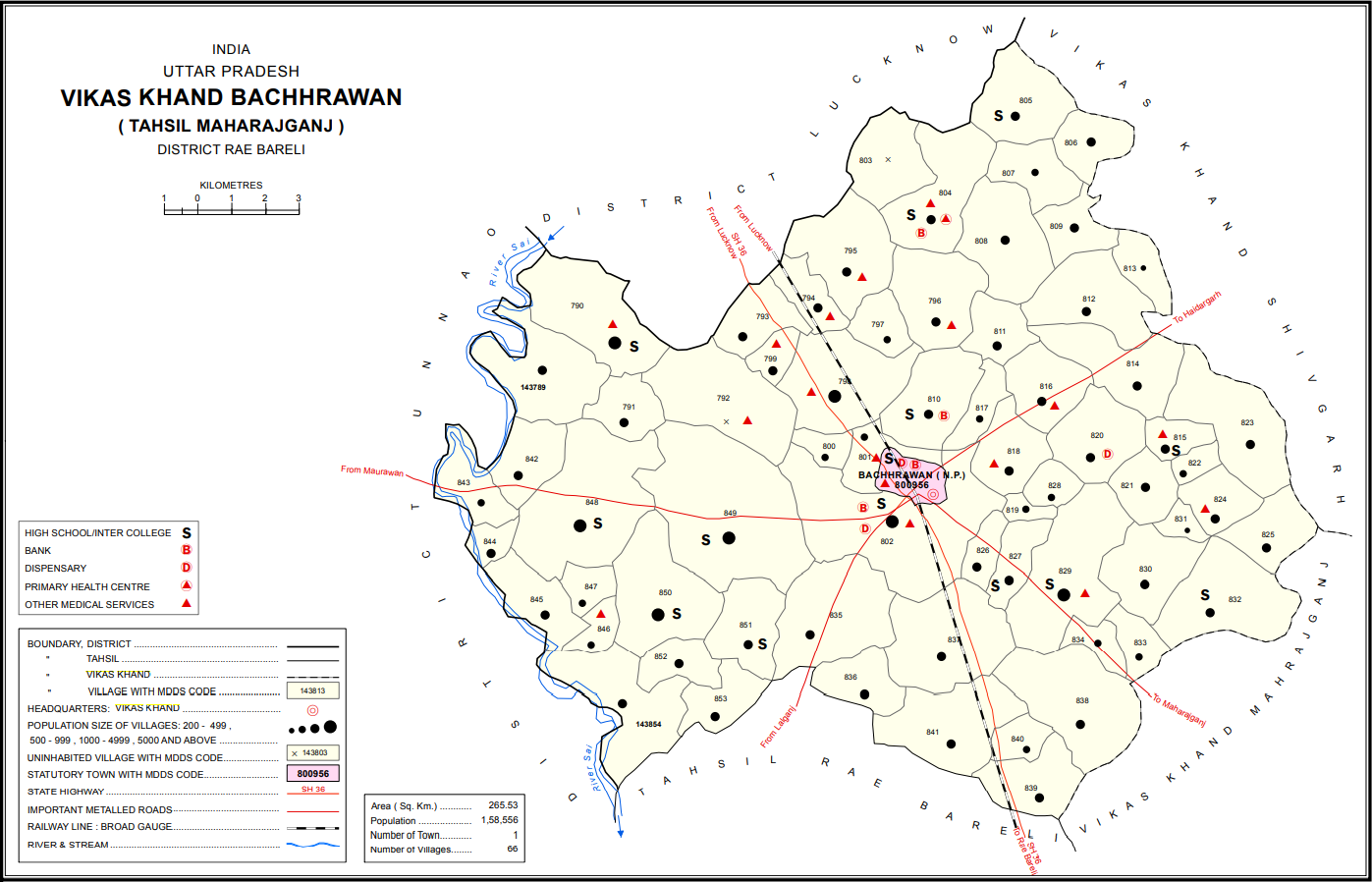
- Map showing Karanpur (#839) in Bachhrawan CD block

- Location in Uttar Pradesh, India
- Coordinates: 26.400802°N 81.139901°E
- Country India: India
- State: Uttar Pradesh
- District: Raebareli

Area
  - Total: 3.22 km^{2} (1.24 sq mi)

Population (2011)
  - Total: 4,171
  - Density: 1,300/km^{2} (3,350/sq mi)

Languages
  - Official: Hindi
- Time zone: UTC+5:30 (IST)
- Vehicle registration: UP-35

Karanpur is a village in Bachhrawan block of Rae Bareli district, Uttar Pradesh, India. Located 23 km from the city of Raebareli, Karanpur was historically one of the main villages in the Bachhrawan pargana. As of 2011, Karanpur's population was 4,171, in 791 households.

The 1961 census recorded Karanpur as comprising 7 hamlets, with a total population of 1,607 people (846 male and 761 female), in 338 households and 318 physical houses. The area of the village was given as 821 acres. It had 3 grain mills then.

The 1981 census recorded Karanpur as having a population of 2,282 people, in 537 households, and having an area of 332.25 hectares.
