= Pahnasa =

Pahnasa Pahnāsa
- Village
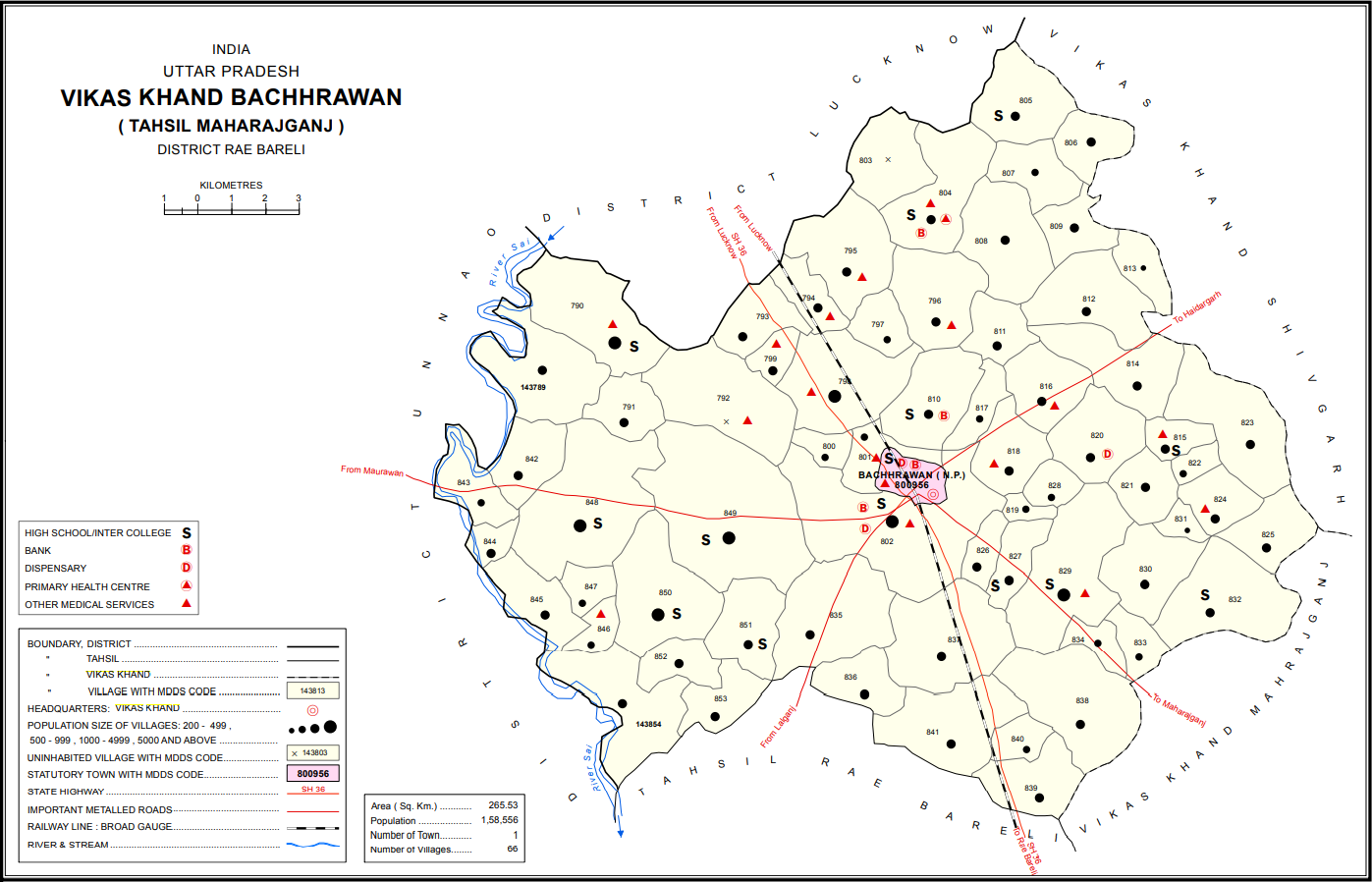
- Map showing Pahnasa (#832) in Bachhrawan CD block

- Location in Uttar Pradesh, India
- Coordinates: 26.449202°N 81.192215°E
- Country India: India
- State: Uttar Pradesh
- District: Raebareli

Area
  - Total: 4.881 km^{2} (1.885 sq mi)

Population (2011)
  - Total: 2,812
  - Density: 576.1/km^{2} (1,492/sq mi)

Languages
  - Official: Hindi
- Time zone: UTC+5:30 (IST)
- Vehicle registration: UP-35

Pahnasa is a village in Bachhrawan block of Rae Bareli district, Uttar Pradesh, India. As of 2011, its population is 2,812, in 558 households. It is located 8 km from Bachhrawan, the block headquarters, and the main staple foods are wheat and rice.

The 1961 census recorded Pahnasa as comprising 7 hamlets, with a total population of 1,287 people (703 male and 584 female), in 278 households and 250 physical houses. The area of the village was given as 1,220 acres.

The 1981 census recorded Pahnasa as having a population of 1,583 people, in 306 households, and having an area of 499.79 hectares.
