= Ashani =

Ashani may refer to:

== People ==
- Ashani Fairclough, Jamaican footballer
- Ashani Lewis, English writer
- Ashani Weeraratna, American-South African cancer researcher

== Other uses ==
- Distant Thunder (1973 film) or Ashani Sanket, a 1973 Indian Bengali-language film by Satyajit Ray
- Ashani pistol

== See also ==
- Ashan (disambiguation)
