= Rampur Sudauli =

- Village
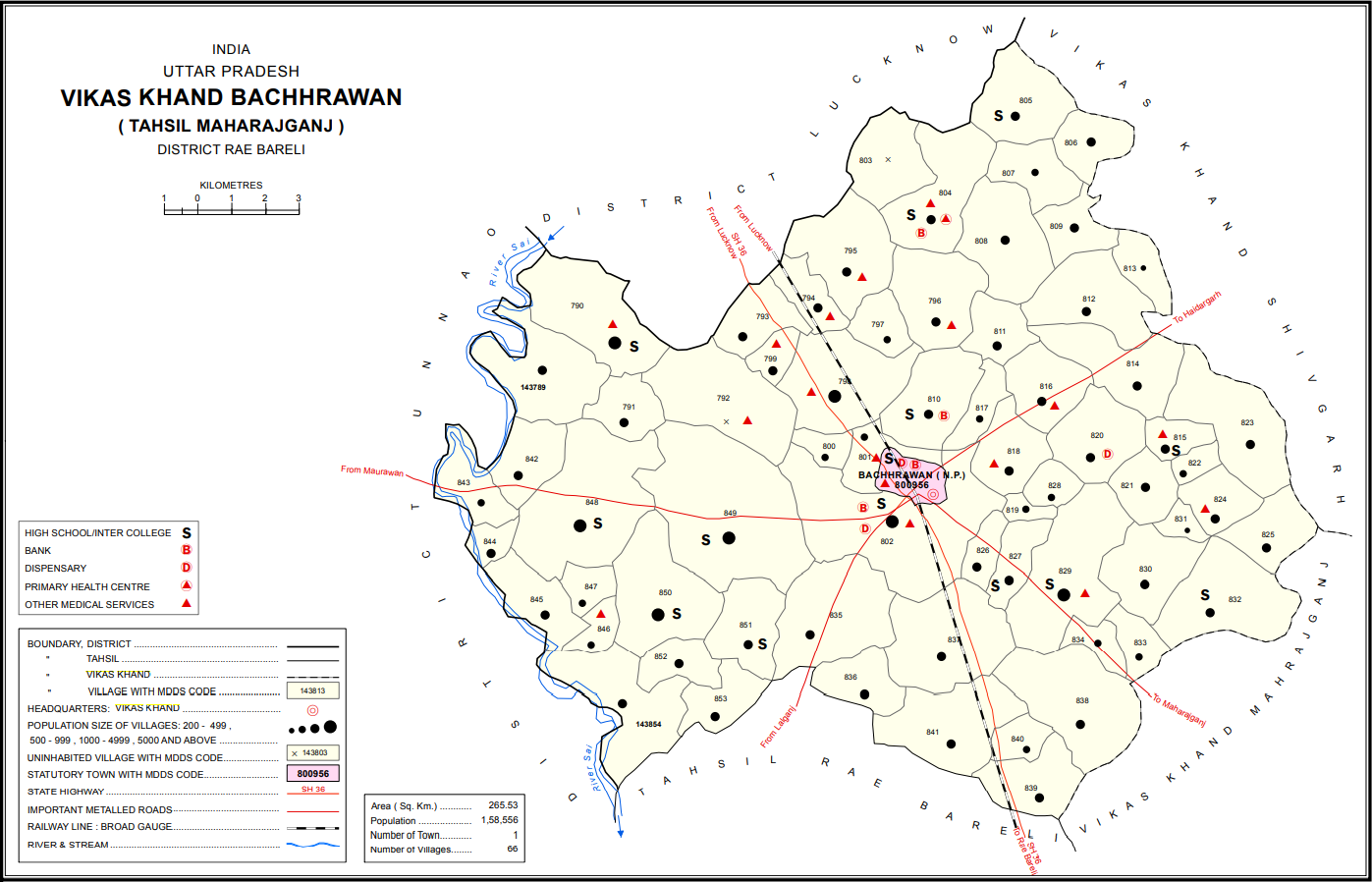
- Map showing Rampur Sudauli (#790) in Bachhrawan CD block

- Location in Uttar Pradesh, India
- Coordinates: 26.518787°N 81.021338°E
- Country India: India
- State: Uttar Pradesh
- District: Raebareli

Area
  - Total: 6.276 km^{2} (2.423 sq mi)

Population (2011)
  - Total: 5,597
  - Density: 891.8/km^{2} (2,310/sq mi)

Languages
  - Official: Hindi
- Time zone: UTC+5:30 (IST)
- Vehicle registration: UP-35

Rampur Sudauli is a village in Bachhrawan block of Rae Bareli district, Uttar Pradesh, India. One of the main villages in the historical pargana of Bachhrawan, Rampur Sudauli is located at the corner of three districts: Raebareli, Lucknow and Unnao This spot is 15 km from Bachhrawan, at the point where the Sai river first enters the district.

As of 2011, Rampur Sudauli's population is 5,597, in 1,013 households. It hosts the Bhuwaneshwar Mahadeo mela on Phalguna Badi 13, which is associated with Shivratra and is dedicated to the worship of Shiva. Thousands of people attend this fair, and vendors bring sweets, toys, and everyday items to sell.

The 1961 census recorded Rampur Sudauli as comprising 7 hamlets, with a total population of 2,266 people (1,206 male and 1,060 female), in 499 households and 465 physical houses. The area of the village was given as 1,581 acres. At the time, it had the following small industrial establishments: 6 grain mills, 1 producer of edible fats and/or oils, 3 miscellaneous food processing facilities, 11 clothing makers, 1 maker of brass and/or bell metal products, 1 miscellaneous maker of metal products (other than iron, brass, bell metal, or aluminum), 1 manufacturer of sundry hardwares, 6 makers of jewellery or other precious metal items, and 6 manufacturers or repairers not assignable to any group.

The 1981 census recorded Rampur Sudauli as having a population of 3,240 people, in 595 households, and having an area of 634.96 hectares.
