= Rasulpur, Bachhrawan =

Rasulpur
- Village
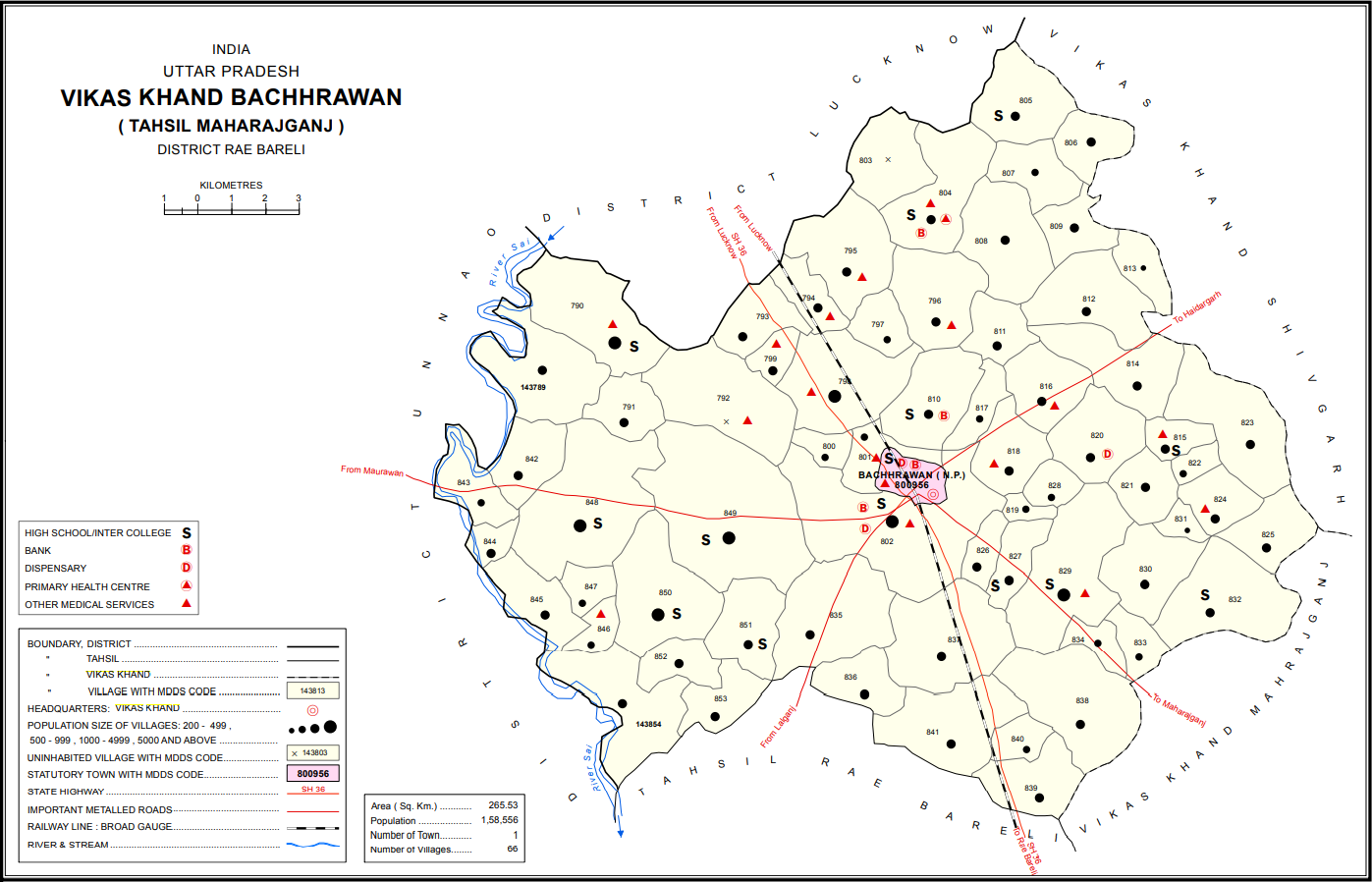
- Map showing Rasulpur (#827) in Bachhrawan CD block

- Location in Uttar Pradesh, India
- Coordinates: 26.45764°N 81.137779°E
- Country India: India
- State: Uttar Pradesh
- District: Raebareli

Area
  - Total: 2.12 km^{2} (0.82 sq mi)

Population (2011)
  - Total: 1,907
  - Density: 900/km^{2} (2,330/sq mi)

Languages
  - Official: Hindi
- Time zone: UTC+5:30 (IST)
- Vehicle registration: UP-35

Rasulpur is a village in Bachhrawan block of Rae Bareli district, Uttar Pradesh, India. As of 2011, its population is 1,907, in 364 households. It is located 3 km from Bachhrawan, the block headquarters, and the main staple foods are wheat and rice.

The 1961 census recorded Rasulpur as comprising 4 hamlets, with a total population of 844 people (445 male and 399 female), in 170 households and 158 physical houses. The area of the village was given as 534 acres.

The 1981 census recorded Rasulpur as having a population of 1,229 people, in 240 households, and having an area of 212.05 hectares.
