= Rani Khera, Bachhrawan =

Rani Khera Rāni Khera
- Village
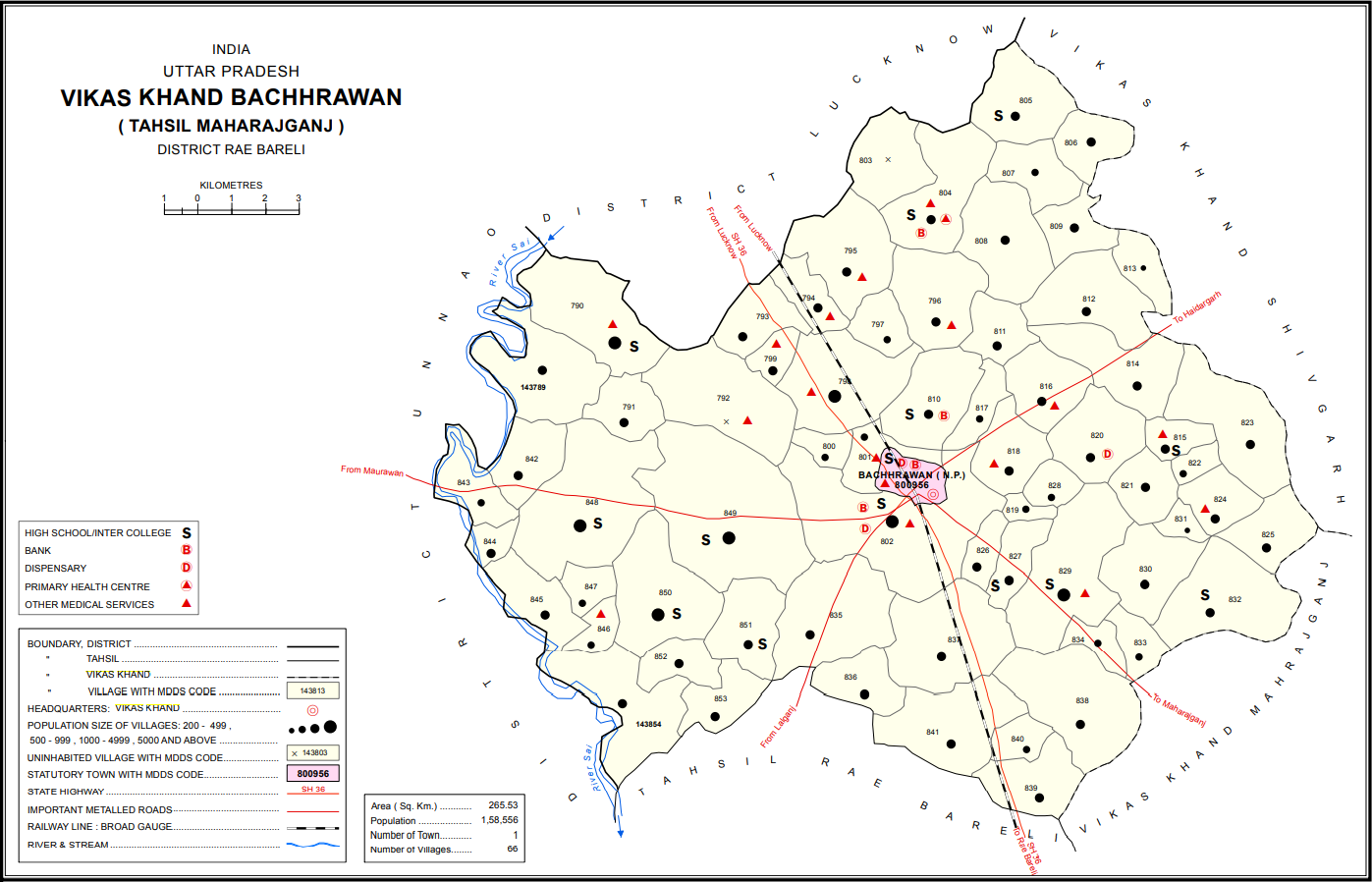
- Map showing Rani Khera (#814) in Bachhrawan CD block

- Location in Uttar Pradesh, India
- Coordinates: 26.504021°N 81.16807°E
- Country India: India
- State: Uttar Pradesh
- District: Raebareli

Area
  - Total: 3.688 km^{2} (1.424 sq mi)

Population (2011)
  - Total: 2,042
  - Density: 553.7/km^{2} (1,434/sq mi)

Languages
  - Official: Hindi
- Time zone: UTC+5:30 (IST)
- Vehicle registration: UP-35

Rani Khera is a village in Bachhrawan block of Rae Bareli district, Uttar Pradesh, India. As of 2011, its population is 2,042, divided in 460 households. It is located 6 km from Bachhrawan, the block headquarters, and the main staple foods are wheat and rice. It has one primary school and no healthcare facilities.

The 1961 census recorded Rani Khera as comprising 11 hamlets, with a total population of 702 people (364 male and 338 female), in 146 households and 135 physical houses. The area of the village was given as 960 acres.

The 1981 census recorded Rani Khera as having a population of 1,009 people, in 213 households, and having an area of 389.31 hectares.
