= Bachhrawan =

- Town
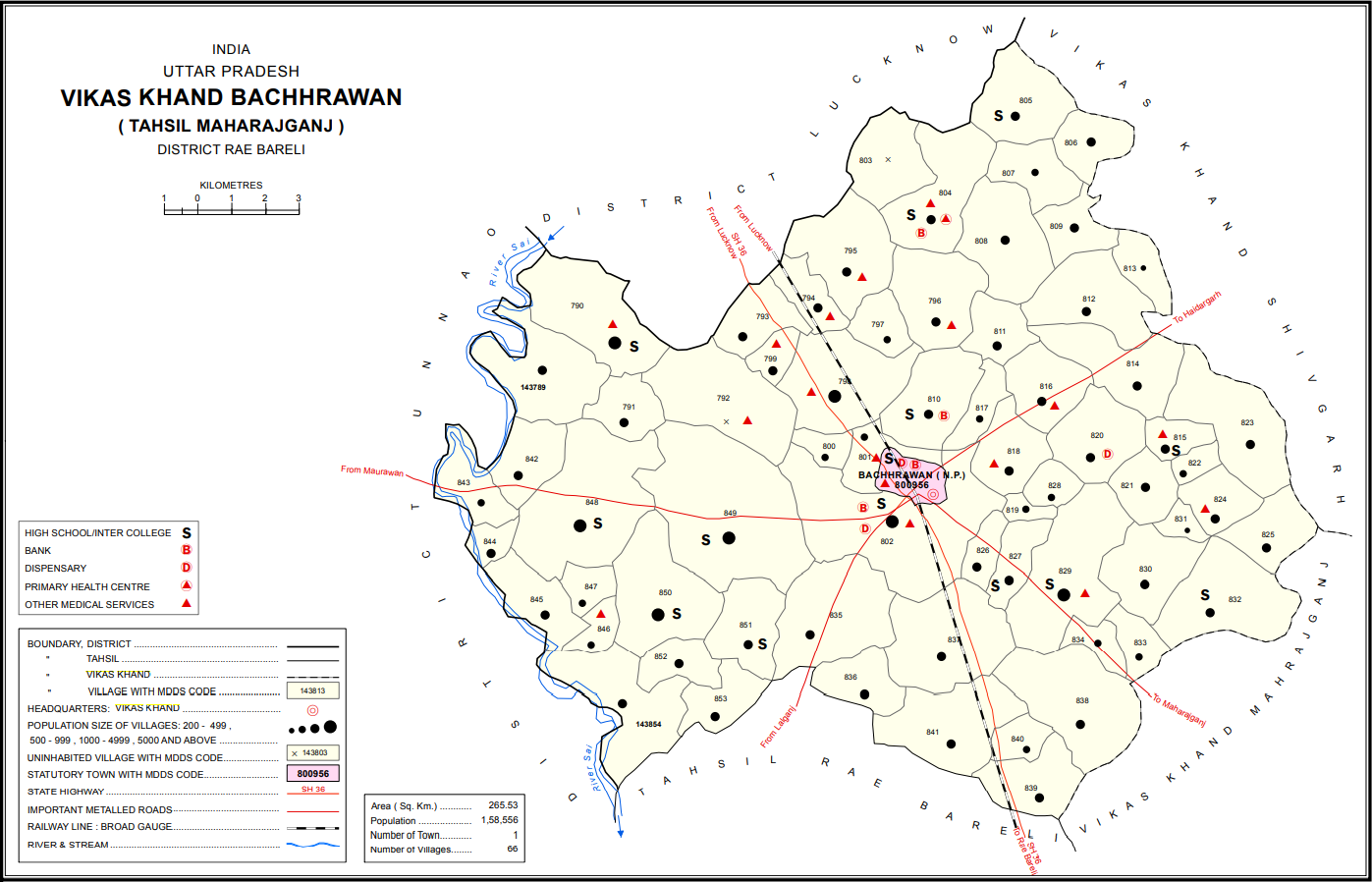
- Map of Bachhrawan CD block

- Location in Uttar Pradesh, India Bachhrawan (India)
- Coordinates: 26.48°N 81.12°E
- Country: India
- State: Uttar Pradesh
- District: Raebareli

Area
  - Total: 2.23 km^{2} (0.86 sq mi)
- Elevation: 116 m (381 ft)

Population (2011)
  - Total: 12,521
  - Density: 5,610/km^{2} (14,500/sq mi)

Languages
  - Official: Hindi, Urdu
- Time zone: UTC+5:30 (IST)
- Postal code: 229301
- Vehicle registration: UP-33
- Website: up.gov.in

Bachhrawan is a town and nagar panchayat in Raebareli district in the state of Uttar Pradesh, India. It is the seat of a community development block. It is located on the main Raebareli-Lucknow road, at the intersection with roads leading to Maharajganj, Haidergarh, and Gurbakhshganj. The railway runs parallel with the Raebareli-Lucknow road, and there is a train station on the west side of town. First upgraded to municipal status in 1935, Bachhrawan hosts a Ramlila festival on Asvina Sudi 10, which involves a dramatic reenactment of the Ramayana. Vendors bring various everyday items to sell at the festival. As of 2011, the population of Bachhrawan is 12,521, in 2,359 households.

== History ==
Near Bachhrawan is a large mound strewn with bricks, which is said to represent the original Bhar town. The Bhars seem to have remained in control of the area even after being subjugated first by the Muslims under Sayyid Salar Masud and then by the Bais Rajputs, and they were only finally defeated in 829 AH under Ibrahim Shah of the Jaunpur Sultanate. At that point, the area was made into the pargana of Thulendi, and it was divided into two tappas called Ashan and Sudauli. Thulendi remained the pargana headquarters until the reign of Nawab Asaf-ud-Daula in the late 1700s, when the headquarters were moved to Bachhrawan.

One of the Chaudhris of Thulendi pargana, Bachhraj Pande, founded the current town of Bachhrawan sometime around the year 1400, and the town is named after him. At about this time, a group of Kurmis from the Jaiswar subdivision had been driven to this area by the pressure of a famine. One of them, Kesho Das, entered the service of Bachhraj Pande and eventually succeeded him as Chaudhri. His descendants kept the office of Chaudhri, as well as a large proprietary estate (including Bachhrawan) until much of this was sold to the Khattris of Maurawan.

At the turn of the 20th century, Bachhrawan was described as a large village with a population of 4,822 people as of the 1901 census. There was a Muslim minority of 403, and the main Hindu caste was the Koris. The village had a police station, a post and telegraph office, a cattle pound, a large primary school, and "a thriving bazar, known as Girdharaganj, in which markets are held twice a week." Bachhrawan was a major exporter of grain, which had especially grown since the opening of the Oudh and Rohilkhand Railway.

Bachhrawan was first upgraded from village to town status in 1935, at the same time as Dalmau, Jais, Lalganj, and Maharajganj.

Bachhrawan was declassified as a town during the 1961 census due to non-fulfilment of urban conditions, and the 1961 census listed statistics for two separate entities: Bachhrawan Rural and Bachhrawan Town Area. The total population of Bachhrawan was 5,957 people: 4,323 in Maurawan Town Area and 1,634 in Maurawan Rural. Bachhrawan Town Area had a population of 2,225 males and 2,098 females, in 940 households and 838 physical houses; Bachhrawan Rural had a population of 866 males and 768 females, in 378 households and 306 physical houses. The Town Area consisted of 4 hamlets and covered an area of 204 acres, while the non-Town Area comprised 14 hamlets and covered an area of 3,562 acres.

The Sri Gandhi Vidyalaya Higher Secondary School in Bachhrawan, founded in 1948, was in 1961 recorded as having a faculty of 26 teachers (all male) and a student body of 658 males and 6 females. The town had a government-run dispensary with 4 beds for males and 2 for females. There was a police force of 2 sub-inspectors, 1 head constable, and 15 constables. Average attendance of the Ram Lila festival was about 1,000 people at the time, while average attendance of the twice-weekly market was 500. The town had the following small industrial establishments then: 6 grain mills, 2 miscellaneous food processing facilities, 3 makers of ice cream, 8 clothing makers, 4 bicycle repair shops, 1 maker of jewellery and/or precious metal items, and 2 places not assignable to any other group.

The first bank in Bachhrawan, a branch of the Co-operative Bank Limited, opened in 1966.

Bachhrawan was returned to town status at the 1981 census. At that time, its main imports were listed as iron, cement, and cloth; the main items manufactured were threshing machines, bullock carts, and drums (which type of drum is not specified); and the main exports were rice, pulses, and wheat.

== Geography ==
It is located at 26.48°N 81.12°E and has an average elevation of 116 metres (380 feet). It is located 50 km from lucknow, the state capital

== Demographics ==
Historical population
Year	Pop.	±%
1941	3,145	—
1951	3,447	+9.6%
1961	Not given	—
1971	Not given	—
1981	7,694	—
1991	9,646	+25.4%
2001	11,893	+23.3%
2011	12,521	+5.3%
Source: 2011 Census of India

According to the 2001 census, Bachhrawan had a population of 11,879. Males constitute 52% of the population and females 48%. Bachhrawan has an average literacy rate of 67%, higher than the national average of 59.5%; with 57% of the males and 43% of females literate. 15% of the population is under 6 years of age.

According to the 2011 census, Bachhrawan has a population of 12,521 people, in 2,359 households. The town's sex ratio is 934 females to every 1000 males; 6,474 of Bachhrawan's residents are male (51.7%) and 6,047 are female (48.3%). The 0-6 age group makes up about 11.5% of the town's population; the sex ratio for this group is 889, which is the second lowest among towns in the district. Members of Scheduled Castes make up 24.77% of the town's population, while no members of Scheduled Tribes were recorded. The town's literacy rate was 82.2% (counting only people age 7 and up); literacy was higher among men and boys (88.2%) than among women and girls (75.8%). The scheduled castes literacy rate is 66.2% (75.07% among men and boys, and 56.98% among women and girls).

In terms of employment, 23.99% of Bachhrawan residents were classified as main workers (i.e. people employed for at least 6 months per year) in 2011. Marginal workers (i.e. people employed for less than 6 months per year) made up 9.02%, and the remaining 66.98% were non-workers. Employment status varied significantly according to gender, with 51.52% of men being either main or marginal workers, compared to only 13.31% of women.

41.10% of Bachhrawan residents live in slum conditions as of 2011. There are 7 slum areas in Bachhrawan, listed from smallest to largest: Hanumanan Tola, Durgan Tola Chamrahia, Uttar Chamratiya, Baagh Tola, Dakshin Chamratiya, Kooti Mohalla, and Qila Mohalla. These range in size from 29 to 241 households and have populations ranging from 149 in Hanumanan Tola to 1,278 in Qila Mohalla. None have access to tap water. The number of flush toilets installed in people's homes ranges from 0 in Durgan Tola Chamrahia to 137 in Kooti Mohalla. All 7 areas are serviced by a mix of open and closed sewers.

== Commerce ==
Bachhrawan hosts markets twice per week, on Tuesdays and Fridays, at the Girdharaganj bazar. Commerce consists of grain and kirana. Girdharaganj was historically one of the most important markets in the Bachhrawan pargana, and it especially gained importance after the railway came to town. At the turn of the 20th century, it served as an export point for oilseeds, poppy seeds, and rice via the railway station, and there was a large cattle market.

== Villages ==
Bachhrawan CD block has the following 66 villages:

Village name	Total land area (hectares)	Population (in 2011)
Kurry	694.9	4,690
Rampur Sudauli	627.6	5,597
Sabji	257	1,875
Isiya	737.6	4,877
Churwa	322	1,661
Dostpur	161.3	1,790
Amawa	537.6	1,990
Kundauli	536.7	3,183
Mahraura	149.2	905
Neemteekar	612	5,414
Saroura	222	1,824
Todarpur	124	728
Malhipur	114	641
Bachhrawan	1,445	9,692
Vinayakpur	374.8	1,374
Sehgon Pashchim Gaon	580.8	4,526
Tamanpur	475.1	2,876
Paliya	229.3	1,015
Sehgon Khanpur	298.8	700
Sehgon Purab Gaon	549.9	2,085
Dund Garh	241.2	1,397
Kasrawan	436.5	3,690
Jahangeerabad	259.6	1,167
Bahadur Nagar	777.8	4,508
Pahrawan	108	449
Rani Khera	368.8	2,042
Haswan	156.9	1,313
Tilenda	369.2	2,414
Ganeshpur Urf Tadipur	79.6	631
Devpuri	105.3	1,188
Bahadurpur	55	650
Jeegoon	473.6	2,560
Bhairampur	252.1	1,108
Padira Khurd	134	970
Ashan Jagatpur	670.1	4,413
Padira Kalan	208	1,289
Uchauri	348.9	1,742
Jalalpur	171.3	1,742
Rasulpur	212	1,907
Gujarpur	130.9	608
Thulendi	930	6,616
Malpur	435.1	2,419
Kalan Garhi	73.1	281
Pahnasa	488.1	2,812
Rampur Mohiuddinpur	199.1	970
Malikpur Saraiya	168.5	839
Bannawa	781	3,264
Maheri	263.2	1,267
Kandawan	704.4	3,194
Umarpur	737.6	2,333
Karanpur	322	4,171
Peerun	171.3	783
Khairhani	654.6	2,466
Neewa	322.1	1,242
Udarhara	178.8	810
Madar Khera	166.8	1,082
Mainahar Katra	538.8	2,197
Saidpur Behta	101.3	612
Darehata	106.2	605
Ichauli	1,054.5	6,977
Sekhpur Samodha	1,315.1	6,931
Rajamau	755.6	5,044
Rain	380.6	2,253
Kalui Khera	296	1,734
Mubarakpur Sapo	210.3	1,640
Pastaur	590.6	2,763
