= Rain, Raebareli =

Rain
- Village
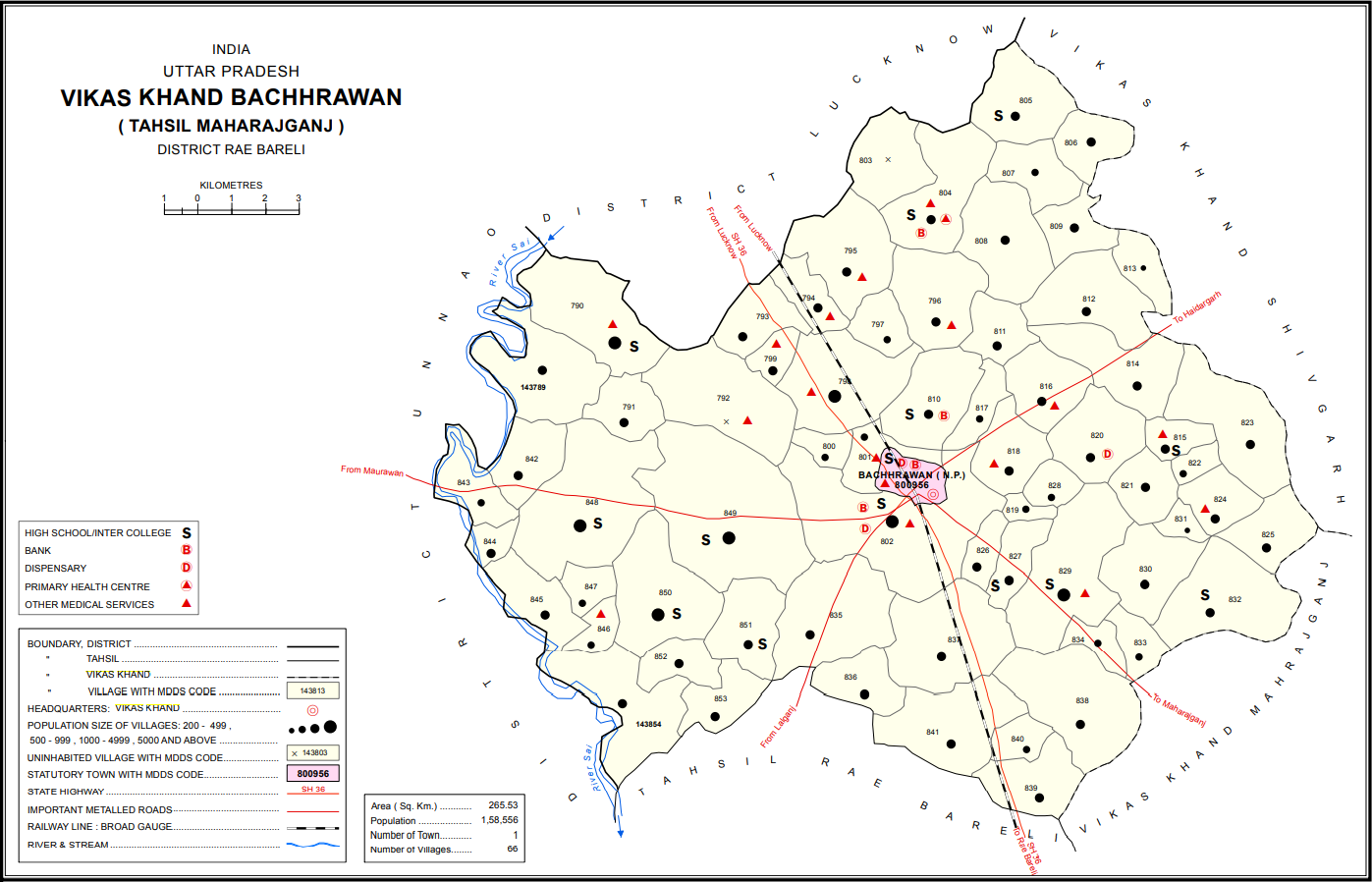
- Map showing Rain (#851) in Bachhrawan CD block

- Location in Uttar Pradesh, India
- Coordinates: 26.432702°N 81.06135°E
- Country India: India
- State: Uttar Pradesh
- District: Raebareli

Area
  - Total: 3.806 km^{2} (1.470 sq mi)

Population (2011)
  - Total: 2,253
  - Density: 592.0/km^{2} (1,533/sq mi)

Languages
  - Official: Hindi
- Time zone: UTC+5:30 (IST)
- Vehicle registration: UP-35

Rain is a village in Bachhrawan block of Rae Bareli district, Uttar Pradesh, India. As of 2011, its population is 2,253, in 454 households. It is located 10 km from Bachhrawan, the block headquarters, and the main staple foods are wheat and rice.

The 1961 census recorded Rain as comprising 3 hamlets, with a total population of 777 people (386 male and 391 female), in 186 households and 186 physical houses. The area of the village was given as 973 acres.

The 1981 census recorded Rain as having a population of 1,241 people, in 254 households, and having an area of 401.46 hectares.
