= Tamanpur =

- Village
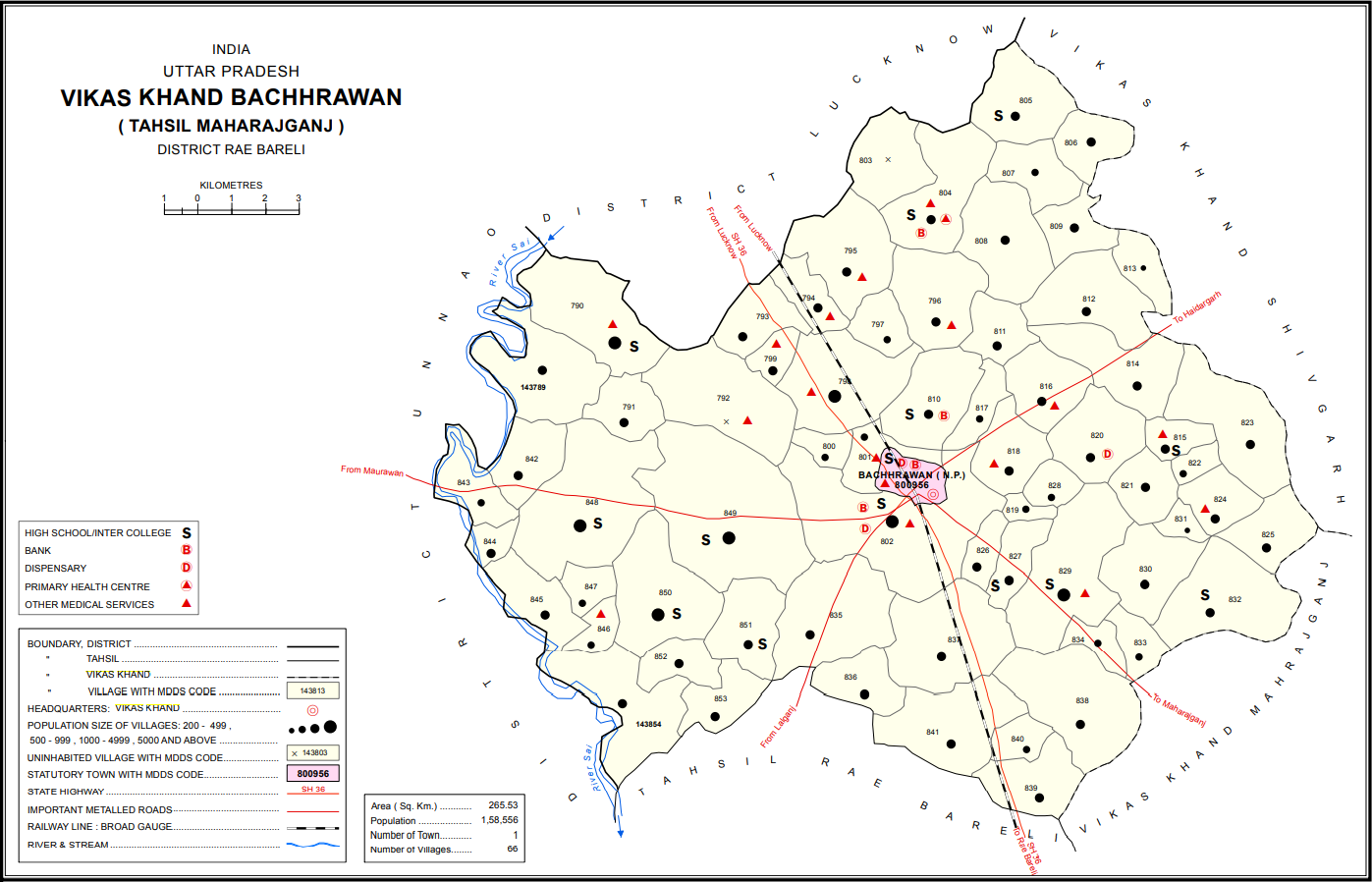
- Map showing Tamanpur (#805) in Bachhrawan CD block

- Location in Uttar Pradesh, India
- Coordinates: 26.558639°N 81.132472°E
- Country India: India
- State: Uttar Pradesh
- District: Raebareli

Area
  - Total: 4.751 km^{2} (1.834 sq mi)

Population (2011)
  - Total: 2,876
  - Density: 605.3/km^{2} (1,568/sq mi)

Languages
  - Official: Hindi
- Time zone: UTC+5:30 (IST)
- Vehicle registration: UP-35

Tamanpur is a village in Bachhrawan block of Rae Bareli district, Uttar Pradesh, India. As of 2011, its population is 2,876, in 531 households. It is located 16 km from Bachhrawan, the block headquarters, and the main staple foods are wheat and rice. It has 3 primary schools and no healthcare facilities.

The 1961 census recorded Tamanpur as comprising 2 hamlets, with a total population of 1,168 people (571 male and 597 female), in 258 households and 230 physical houses. The area of the village was given as 1,141 acres.

The 1981 census recorded Tamanpur as having a population of 1,063 people, in 558 households, and having an area of 480.57 hectares.
