= Gujarpur =

- Village
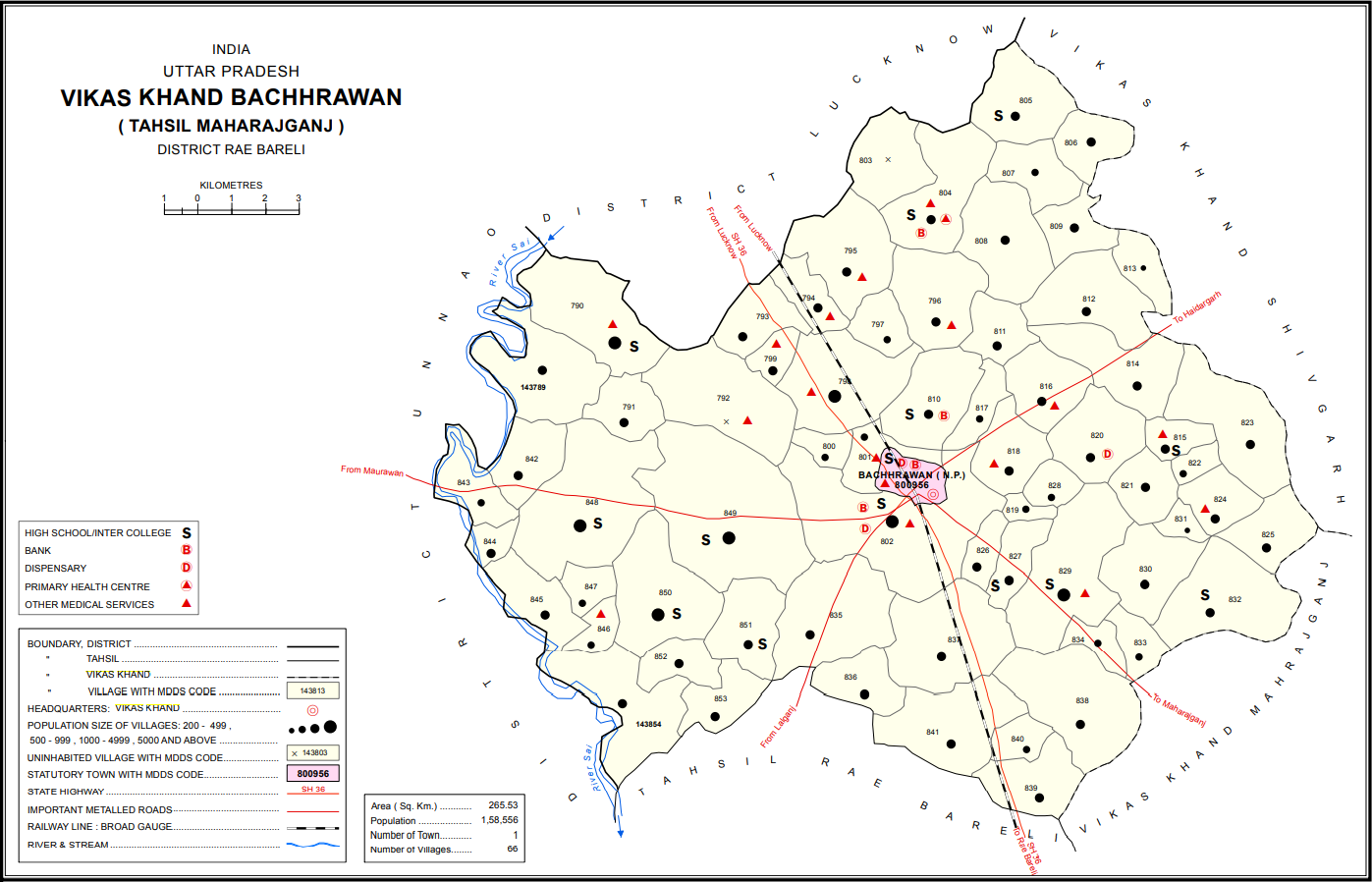
- Map showing Gujarpur (#828) in Bachhrawan CD block

- Location in Uttar Pradesh, India
- Coordinates: 26.469492°N 81.145437°E
- Country India: India
- State: Uttar Pradesh
- District: Raebareli

Area
  - Total: 1.309 km^{2} (0.505 sq mi)

Population (2011)
  - Total: 608
  - Density: 464/km^{2} (1,200/sq mi)

Languages
  - Official: Hindi
- Time zone: UTC+5:30 (IST)
- Vehicle registration: UP-35

Gujarpur is a village in Bachhrawan block of Rae Bareli district, Uttar Pradesh, India. As of 2011, its population is 608, in 127 households. It is located 4 km from Bachhrawan, the block headquarters, and the main staple foods are wheat and rice. It has one primary school and no healthcare facilities.

The 1961 census recorded Gujarpur as comprising 1 hamlet, with a total population of 283 people (141 male and 142 female), in 62 households and 46 physical houses. The area of the village was given as 325 acres.

The 1981 census recorded Gujarpur as having a population of 371 people, in 79 households, and having an area of 131.12 hectares.
