= Pastaur =

- Village
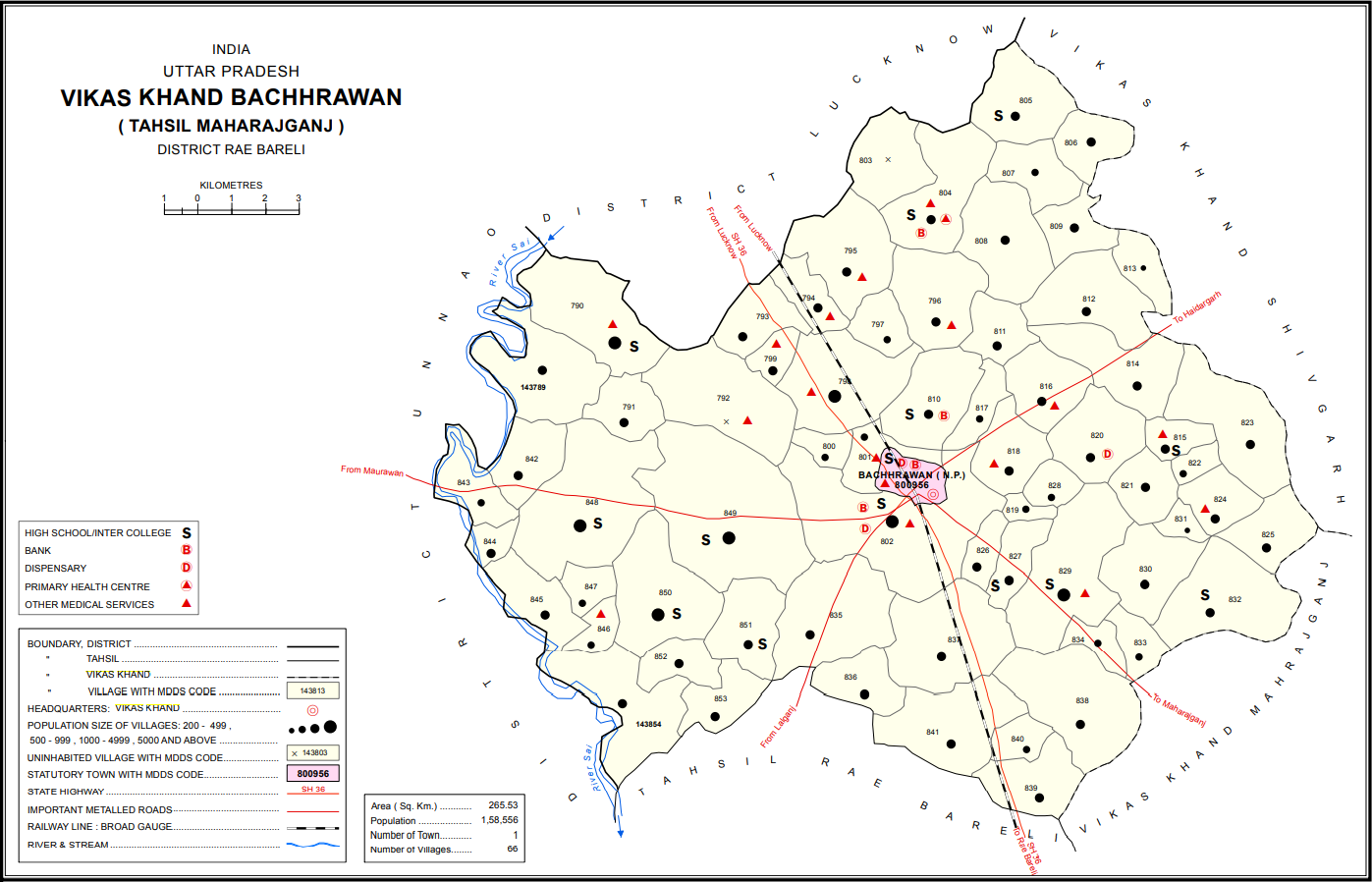
- Map showing Pastaur (#143854) in Bachhrawan CD block

- Location in Uttar Pradesh, India
- Coordinates: 26.41391°N 81.034267°E
- Country India: India
- State: Uttar Pradesh
- District: Raebareli

Area
  - Total: 5.906 km^{2} (2.280 sq mi)

Population (2011)
  - Total: 2,763
  - Density: 467.8/km^{2} (1,212/sq mi)

Languages
  - Official: Hindi
- Time zone: UTC+5:30 (IST)
- Vehicle registration: UP-35

Pastaur is a village in Bachhrawan block of Rae Bareli district, Uttar Pradesh, India. As of 2011, its population is 2,197, in 382 households. It is located 13 km from Bachhrawan, the block headquarters, and the main staple foods are wheat and rice.

The 1961 census recorded Pastaur as comprising 5 hamlets, with a total population of 1,043 people (528 male and 515 female), in 213 households and 205 physical houses. The area of the village was given as 1,470 acres.

The 1981 census recorded Pastaur as having a population of 1,517 people, in 287 households, and having an area of 615.93 hectares.
