= Saidpur Behta =

- Village
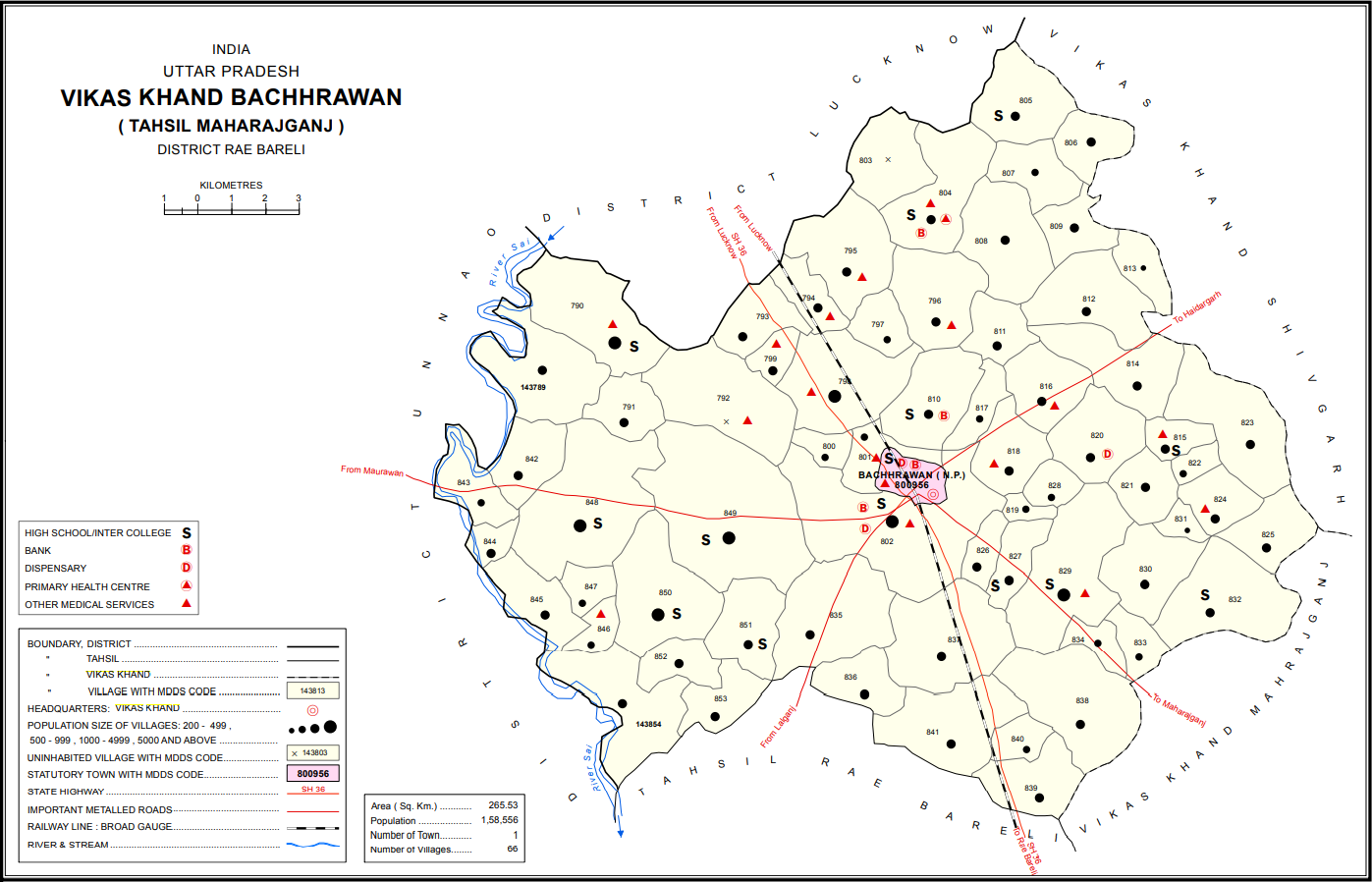
- Map showing Saidpur Behta (#846) in Bachhrawan CD block

- Location in Uttar Pradesh, India
- Coordinates: 26.43741°N 81.024287°E
- Country India: India
- State: Uttar Pradesh
- District: Raebareli

Area
  - Total: 1.013 km^{2} (0.391 sq mi)

Population (2011)
  - Total: 612
  - Density: 604/km^{2} (1,560/sq mi)

Languages
  - Official: Hindi
- Time zone: UTC+5:30 (IST)
- Vehicle registration: UP-35

Saidpur Behta is a village in Bachhrawan block of Rae Bareli district, Uttar Pradesh, India. As of 2011, its population is 612, in 118 households. It historically belonged to the taluqdars of Tirbediganj.

The 1961 census recorded Saidpur Behta as comprising 1 hamlet, with a total population of 220 people (145 male and 115 female [sic]), in 50 households and 43 physical houses. The area of the village was given as 244 acres.

The 1981 census recorded Saidpur Behta as having a population of 355 people, in 64 households, and having an area of 100.77 hectares.
