= Sheikhpur Samodha =

- Village
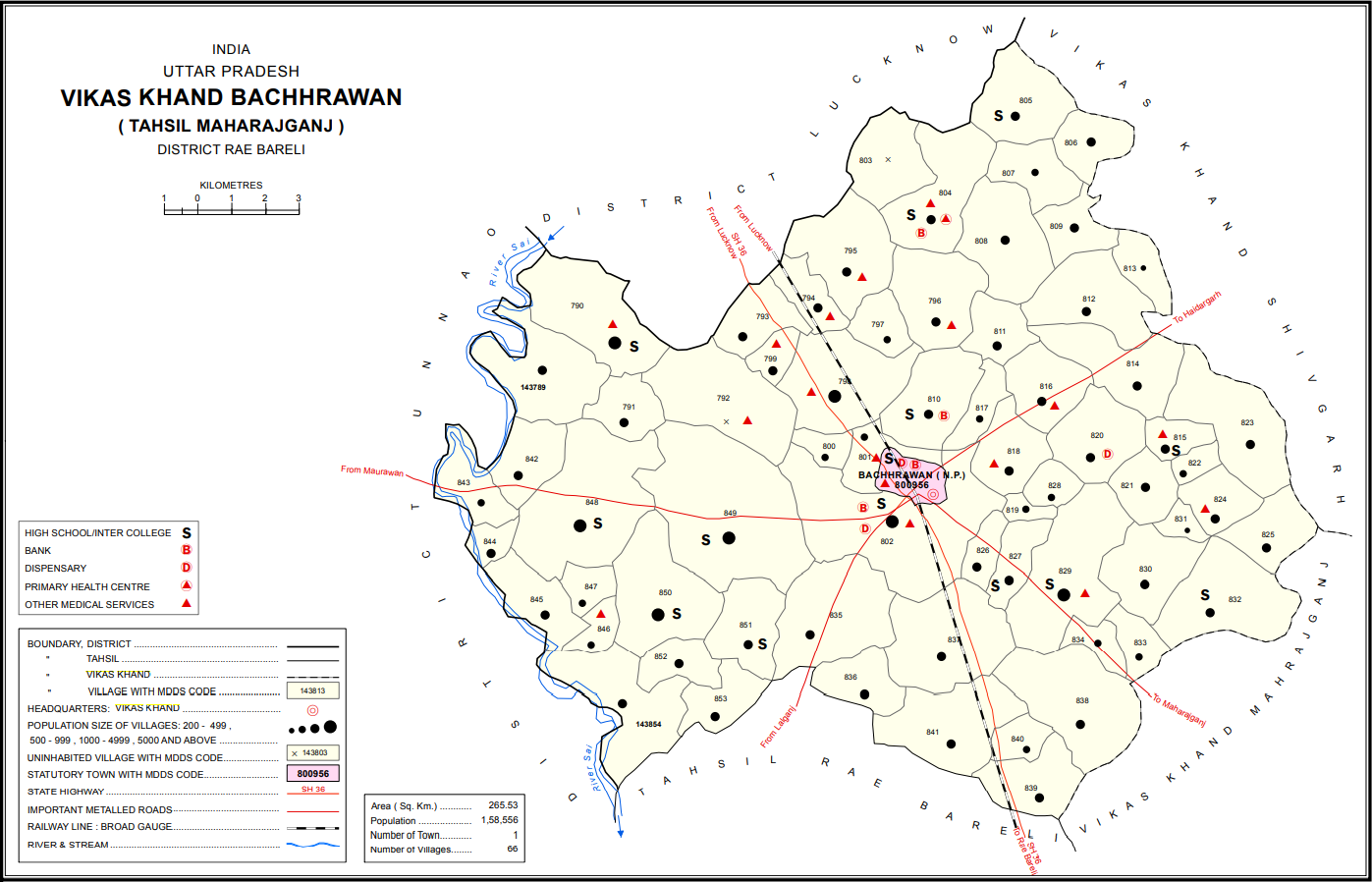
- Map showing Sheikhpur Samodha (#849) in Bachhrawan CD block

- Location in Uttar Pradesh, India
- Coordinates: 26.462576°N 81.06216°E
- Country India: India
- State: Uttar Pradesh
- District: Raebareli

Area
  - Total: 13.151 km^{2} (5.078 sq mi)

Population (2011)
  - Total: 6,931
  - Density: 527.0/km^{2} (1,365/sq mi)

Languages
  - Official: Hindi
- Time zone: UTC+5:30 (IST)
- Vehicle registration: UP-35

Sheikhpur Samodha is a village in Bachhrawan block of Rae Bareli district, Uttar Pradesh, India. Historically one of the main villages in the pargana of Bachhrawan, Sheikhpur Samodha hosts no market and is connected to minor district roads. It is located 4 km from Bachhrawan, the block headquarters. As of 2011, Sheikhpur Samodha's population is 6,931, in 1,376 households.

The 1961 census recorded Sheikhpur Samodha (as "Seikhpur Samodha") as comprising 13 hamlets, with a total population of 2,815 people (1,471 male and 1,344 female), in 565 households and 520 physical houses. The area of the village was given as 3,179 acres. It had a post office then, as well as 2 grain mills and 2 tanneries.

The 1981 census recorded Sheikhpur Samodha as having a population of 4,170 people, in 783 households, and having an area of 1,301.88 hectares.
