= Bahadurnagar =

Bahadurnagar Bahādurnagar
- Village
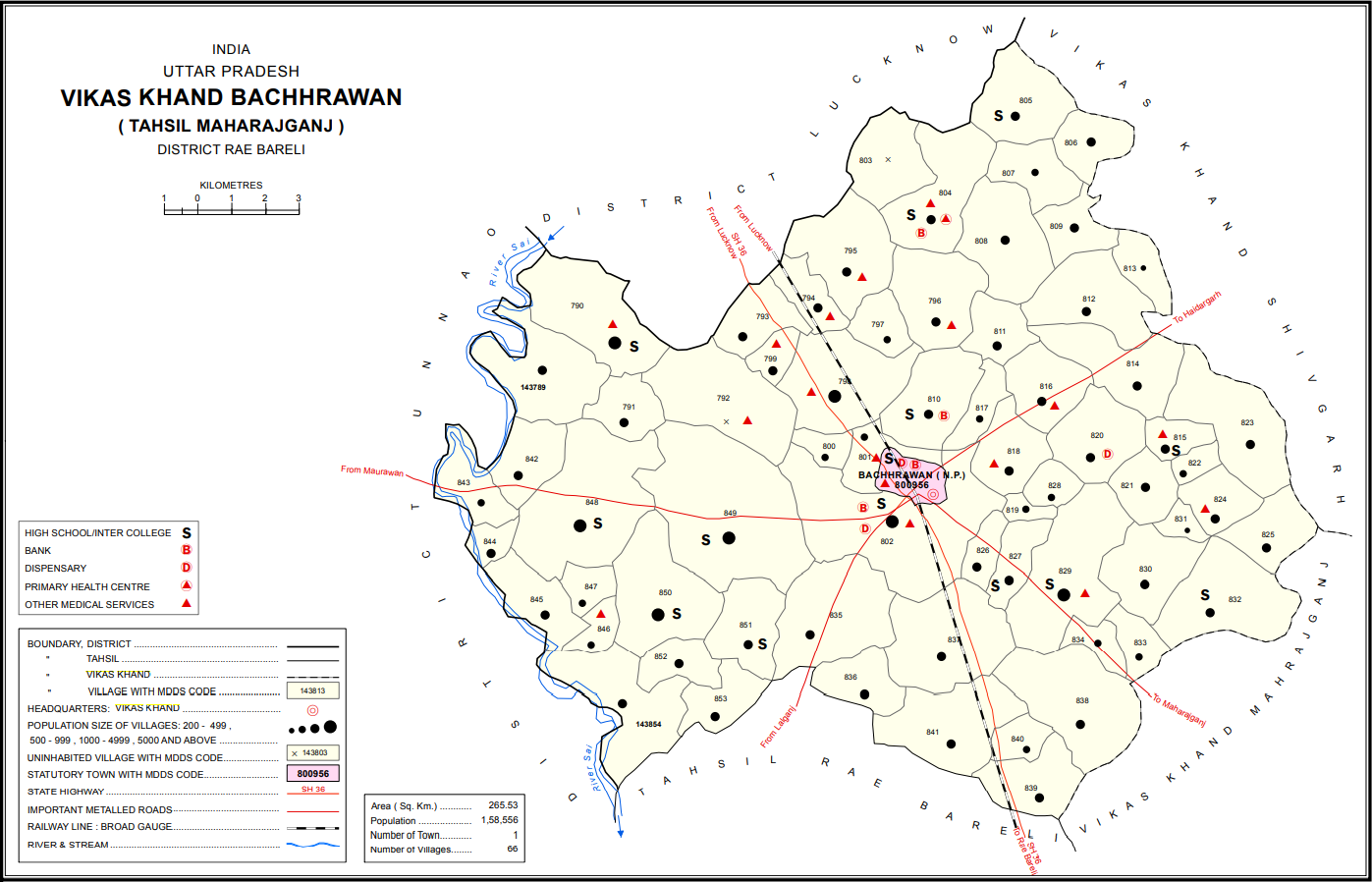
- Map showing Bahadurnagar (#812) in Bachhrawan CD block

- Location in Uttar Pradesh, India
- Coordinates: 26.513392°N 81.163779°E
- Country India: India
- State: Uttar Pradesh
- District: Raebareli

Area
  - Total: 7.778 km^{2} (3.003 sq mi)

Population (2011)
  - Total: 4,508
  - Density: 579.6/km^{2} (1,501/sq mi)

Languages
  - Official: Hindi
- Time zone: UTC+5:30 (IST)
- Vehicle registration: UP-35

Bahadurnagar is a village in Bachhrawan block of Rae Bareli district, Uttar Pradesh, India. Located 8 km from Bachhrawan, the block headquarters, Bahadurnagar hosts a market on Mondays and Thursdays. It was historically one of the main villages in the Bachhrawan pargana. As of 2011, Bahadurnagar's population is 4,508, in 964 households.

The 1961 census recorded Bahadurnagar as comprising 14 hamlets, with a total population of 2,034 people (1,078 male and 956 female), in 430 households and 410 physical houses. The area of the village was given as 1,954 acres. It had a post office then.

The 1981 census recorded Bahadurnagar as having a population of 2,707 people, in 587 households, and having an area of 784.28 hectares.
