= Malpur, Bachhrawan =

Malpur
- Village
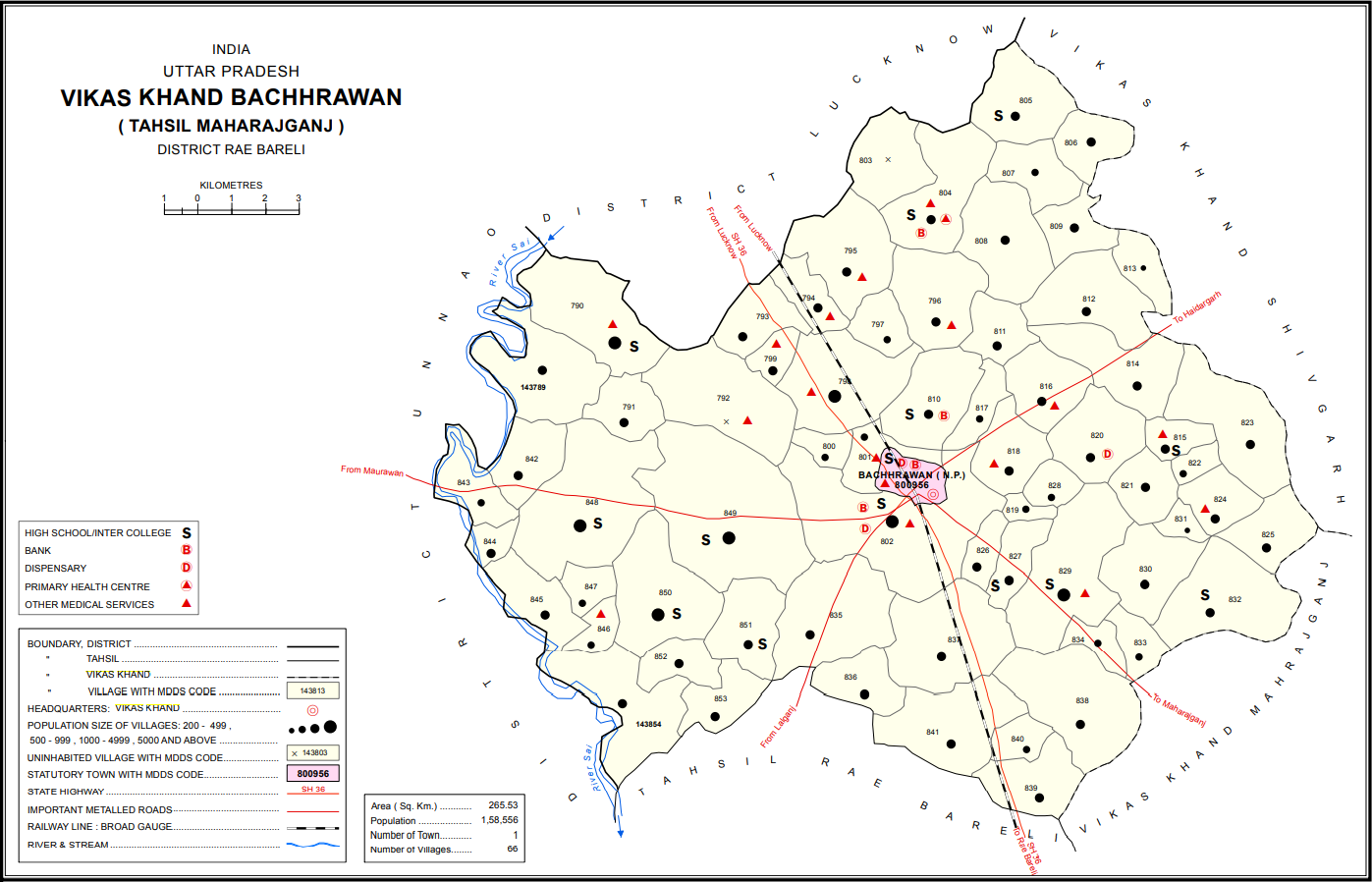
- Map showing Malpur (#830) in Bachhrawan CD block

- Location in Uttar Pradesh, India
- Coordinates: 26.451511°N 81.161644°E
- Country India: India
- State: Uttar Pradesh
- District: Raebareli

Area
  - Total: 4.351 km^{2} (1.680 sq mi)

Population (2011)
  - Total: 2,419
  - Density: 556.0/km^{2} (1,440/sq mi)

Languages
  - Official: Hindi
- Time zone: UTC+5:30 (IST)
- Vehicle registration: UP-35

Malpur is a village in Bachhrawan block of Rae Bareli district, Uttar Pradesh, India. As of 2011, its population is 2,419, in 474 households. It is located 5 km from Bachhrawan, the block headquarters, and the main staple foods are wheat and rice. It has one primary school and no healthcare facilities.

The 1961 census recorded Malpur as comprising 9 hamlets, with a total population of 1,090 people (582 male and 508 female), in 260 households and 255 physical houses. The area of the village was given as 1,074 acres.

The 1981 census recorded Malpur as having a population of 1,468 people, in 362 households, and having an area of 435.04 hectares.
