= Deopuri =

Deopuri Devpuri
- Village
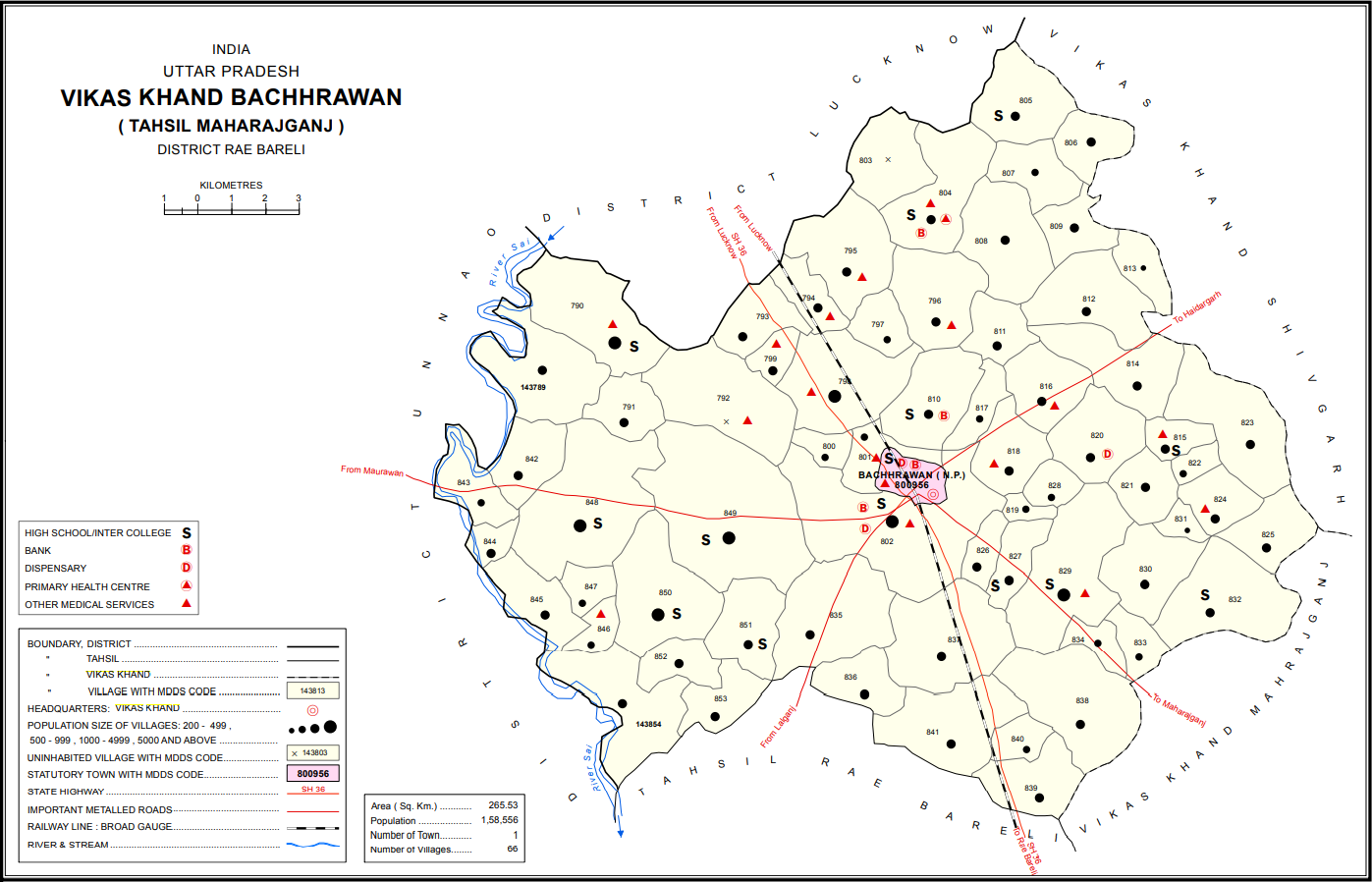
- Map showing Deopuri (#818) in Bachhrawan CD block

- Location in Uttar Pradesh, India
- Coordinates: 26.472334°N 81.134884°E
- Country India: India
- State: Uttar Pradesh
- District: Raebareli

Area
  - Total: 1.053 km^{2} (0.407 sq mi)

Population (2011)
  - Total: 1,188
  - Density: 1,128/km^{2} (2,922/sq mi)

Languages
  - Official: Hindi
- Time zone: UTC+5:30 (IST)
- Vehicle registration: UP-35

Deopuri, also spelled Devpuri, is a village in Bachhrawan block of Rae Bareli district, Uttar Pradesh, India. As of 2011, its population is 1,188, in 244 households. Located 2 km from Bachhrawan, Deopuri was historically the last village (along with partial shares in 3 other villages) held by the zamindars descended from Qazi Sultan, the first zamindar of the pargana of Thulendi in the 1400s.

The 1961 census recorded Deopuri as comprising 1 hamlet, with a total population of 632 people (343 male and 289 female), in 133 households and 116 physical houses. The area of the village was given as 822 acres.

The 1981 census recorded Deopuri as having a population of 775 people, in 163 households, and having an area of 334.67 hectares. No amenities other than drinking water were available.
