= Rajamau, Bachhrawan =

Rajamau Rājāmau, Raja Mau
- Village
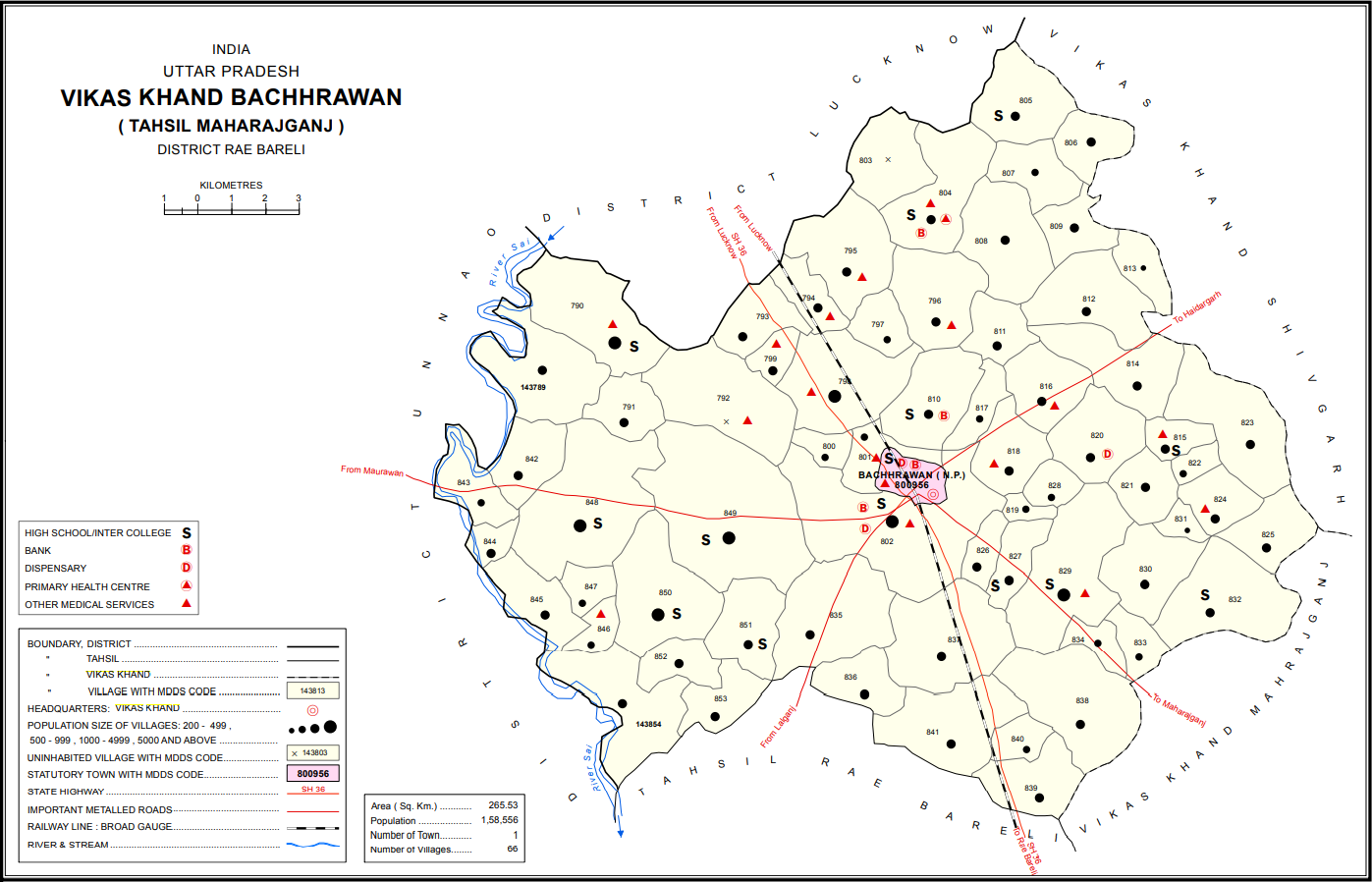
- Map showing Rajamau (#850) in Bachhrawan CD block

- Location in Uttar Pradesh, India
- Coordinates: 26.436392°N 81.039485°E
- Country India: India
- State: Uttar Pradesh
- District: Raebareli

Area
  - Total: 7.556 km^{2} (2.917 sq mi)

Population (2011)
  - Total: 5,044
  - Density: 667.5/km^{2} (1,729/sq mi)

Languages
  - Official: Hindi
- Time zone: UTC+5:30 (IST)
- Vehicle registration: UP-33

Rajamau is a village in Bachhrawan block of Rae Bareli district, Uttar Pradesh, India. As of 2011, its population is 5,044, in 927 households, and it has 5 primary schools and no healthcare facilities. It is located 10 km southwest of Bachhrawan, the block headquarters, and the main staple foods are wheat and rice. Rajamau hosts a Rajeshwar Mahadeo mela on Sawan Sudi 5 dedicated to the worship of Shiva; vendors bring sweets, toys, and everyday items to sell at the fair.

== History ==
At the turn of the 20th century, Rajamau served as the headquarters of the Bais taluqdars of Udrehra. The village had a bazar, an aided school, and "a fine temple, built by the taluqdar". The dangol, or wrestling fair, was noted as being held here during the full moon in Sawan, and it had an attendance of some 2,000 people at the time. The population of Rajamau as of the 1901 census was 1,767.

The 1961 census recorded Rajamau as comprising 6 hamlets, with a total population of 2,055 people (1,053 male and 1,002 female), in 453 households and 429 physical houses. The area of the village was given as 1,627 acres. It had a medical practitioner then. Average attendance of the Kalreshwar Mahadeo mela was listed as about 500 people at the time.

The 1981 census recorded Rajamau as having a population of 3,115 people, in 638 households, and having an area of 669.76 hectares.
