= Kasrawan, Raebareli =

Kasrawan Kasrāwān
- Village
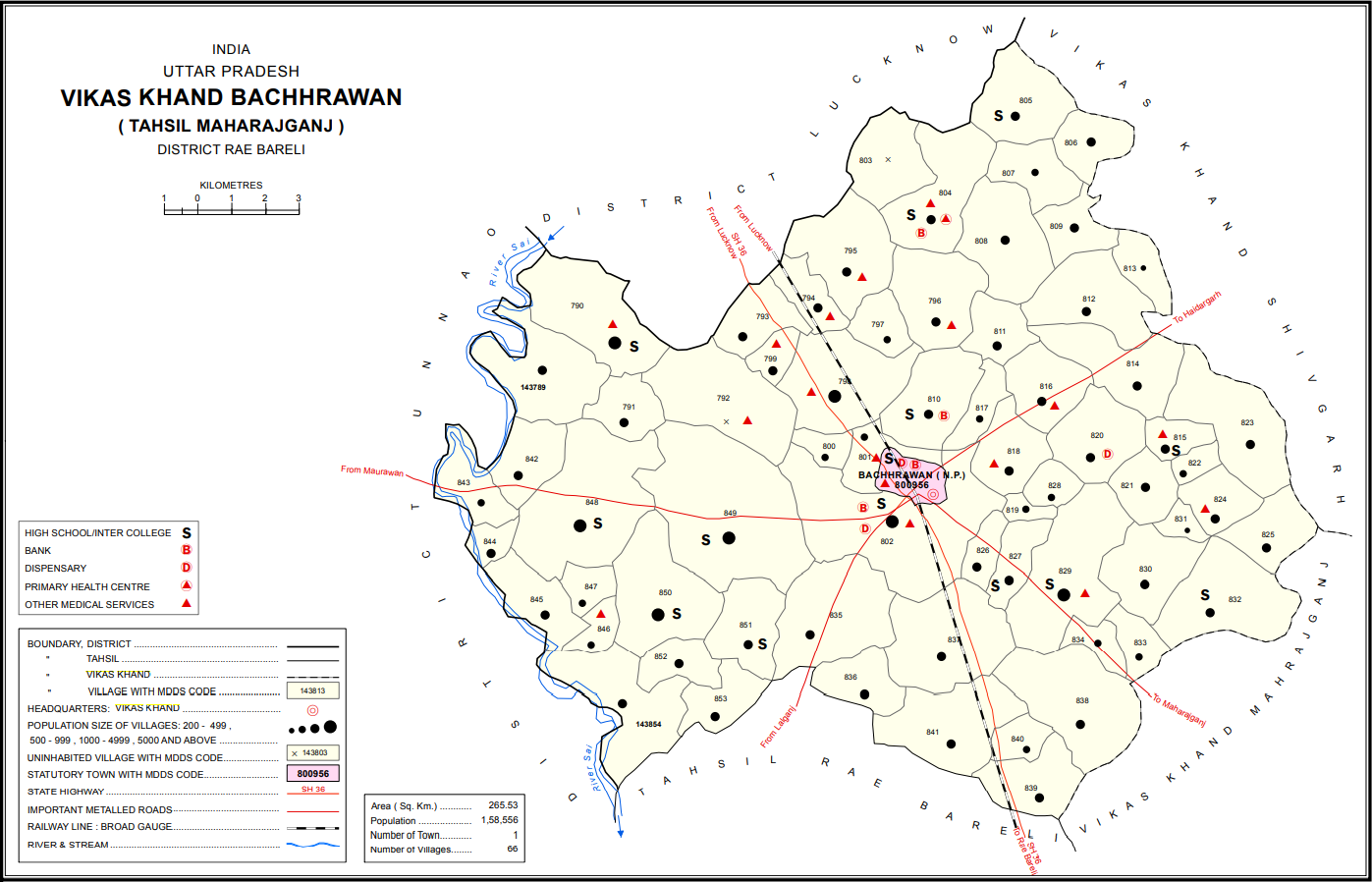
- Map showing Kasrawan (#810) in Bachhrawan CD block

- Location in Uttar Pradesh, India
- Coordinates: 26.488833°N 81.113299°E
- Country India: India
- State: Uttar Pradesh
- District: Raebareli

Area
  - Total: 4.365 km^{2} (1.685 sq mi)

Population (2011)
  - Total: 3,690
  - Density: 845/km^{2} (2,190/sq mi)

Languages
  - Official: Hindi
- Time zone: UTC+5:30 (IST)
- Vehicle registration: UP-35

Kasrawan is a village in Bachhrawan block of Rae Bareli district, Uttar Pradesh, India. It is located 3 km from Bachhrawan, the block headquarters, and the main staple foods are wheat and rice. As of 2011, its population is 3,690, in 725 households.

The 1961 census recorded Kasrawan as comprising 6 hamlets, with a total population of 1,784 people (937 male and 847 female), in 422 households and 337 physical houses. The area of the village was given as 1,373 acres and it had a post office at the time.

The 1981 census recorded Kasrawan as having a population of 2,437 people, in 996 households, and having an area of 551.19 hectares.
