= Mainahar Katra =

Mainahar Katra Maināhar Katra
- Village
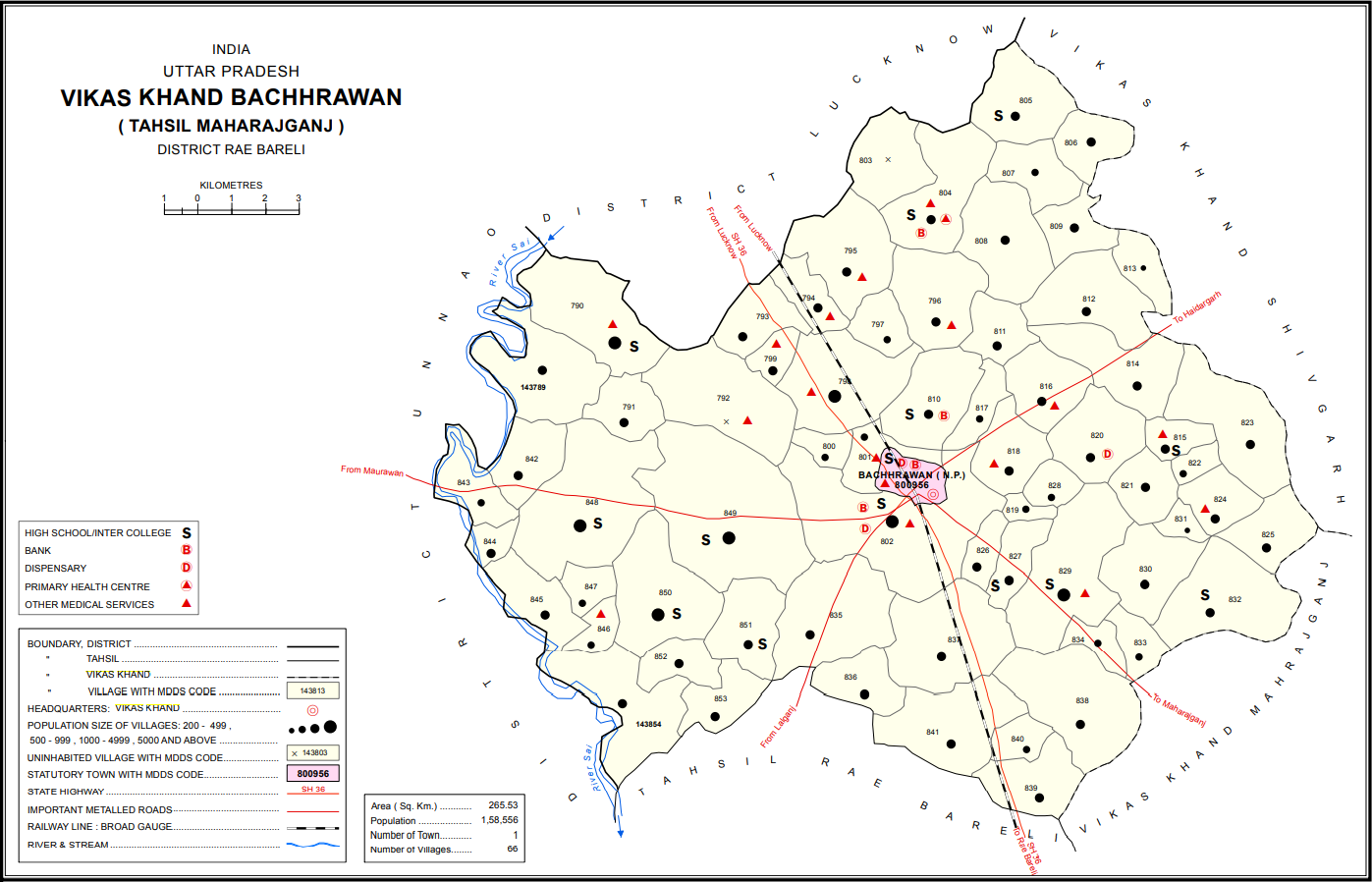
- Map showing Mainahar Katra (#845) in Bachhrawan CD block

- Location in Uttar Pradesh, India
- Coordinates: 26.446882°N 81.015082°E
- Country India: India
- State: Uttar Pradesh
- District: Raebareli

Area
  - Total: 5.388 km^{2} (2.080 sq mi)

Population (2011)
  - Total: 2,197
  - Density: 407.8/km^{2} (1,056/sq mi)

Languages
  - Official: Hindi
- Time zone: UTC+5:30 (IST)
- Vehicle registration: UP-35

Mainahar Katra is a village in Bachhrawan block of Rae Bareli district, Uttar Pradesh, India. As of 2011, its population is 2,197, in 382 households. It historically formed a taluqdar estate.

The 1961 census recorded Mainahar Katra as comprising 4 hamlets, with a total population of 1,083 people (583 male and 500 female), in 217 households and 199 physical houses. The area of the village was given as 1,349 acres.

The 1981 census recorded Mainahar Katra as having a population of 1,166 people, in 214 households, and having an area of 545.93 hectares.
