= Churwa =

- Village
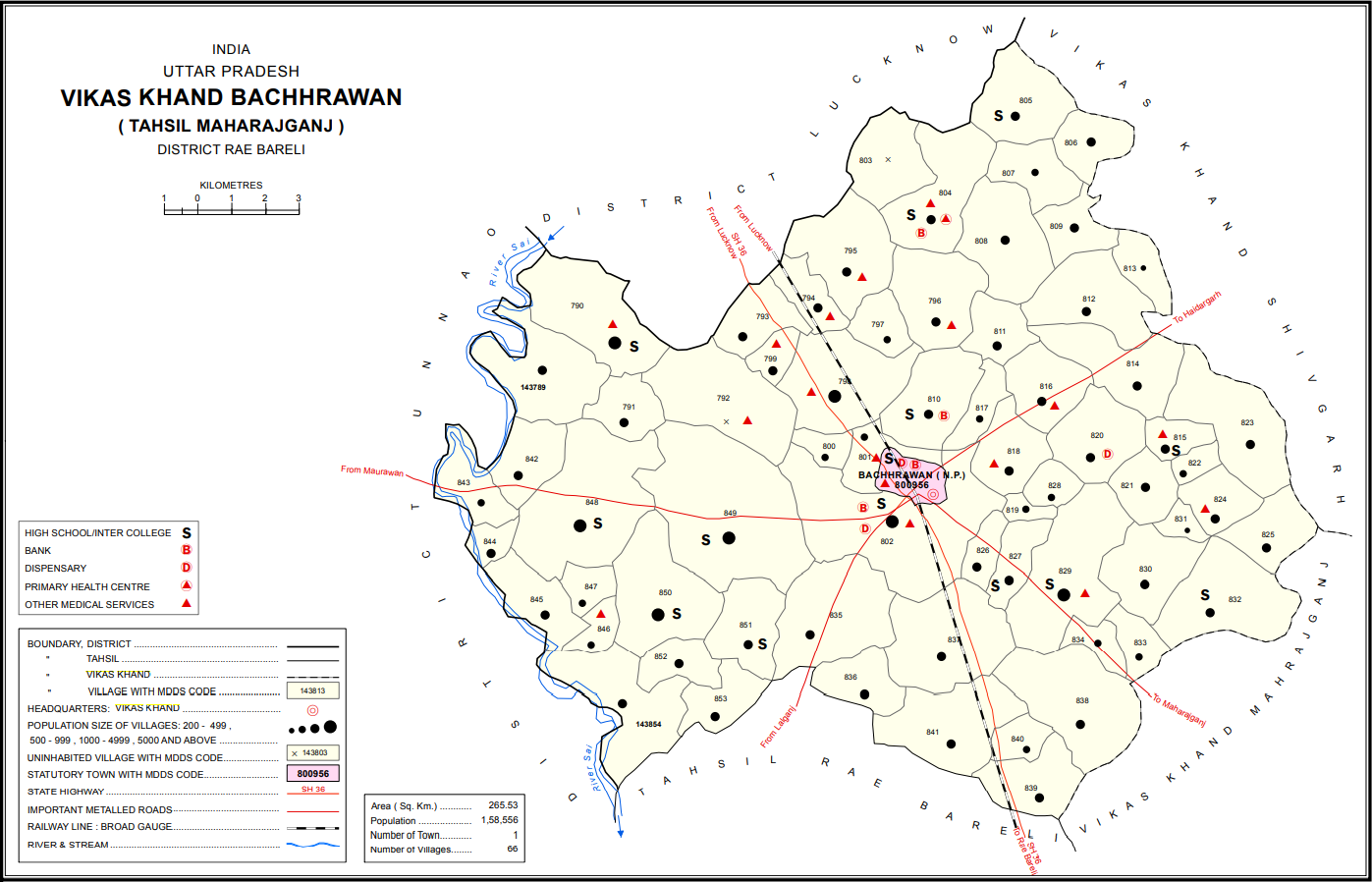
- Map showing Churwa (#793) in Bachhrawan CD block

- Location in Uttar Pradesh, India
- Coordinates: 26.510837°N 81.066871°E
- Country India: India
- State: Uttar Pradesh
- District: Raebareli

Area
  - Total: 3.22 km^{2} (1.24 sq mi)

Population (2011)
  - Total: 1,661
  - Density: 516/km^{2} (1,340/sq mi)

Languages
  - Official: Hindi
- Time zone: UTC+5:30 (IST)
- Vehicle registration: UP-35

Churwa is a village in Bachhrawan block of Rae Bareli district, Uttar Pradesh, India. It is located 6 km from Bachhrawan, the block headquarters, and the main staple foods are wheat and rice. As of 2011, its population is 1,661, in 323 households.

The 1961 census recorded Churwa (as "Churuwa") as comprising 5 hamlets, with a total population of 790 people (405 male and 384 female), in 121 households and 110 physical houses. The area of the village was given as 704 acres.

The 1981 census recorded Churwa as having a population of 1,008 people, in 192 households, and having an area of 291.78 hectares.
