= Mahraura =

- Village
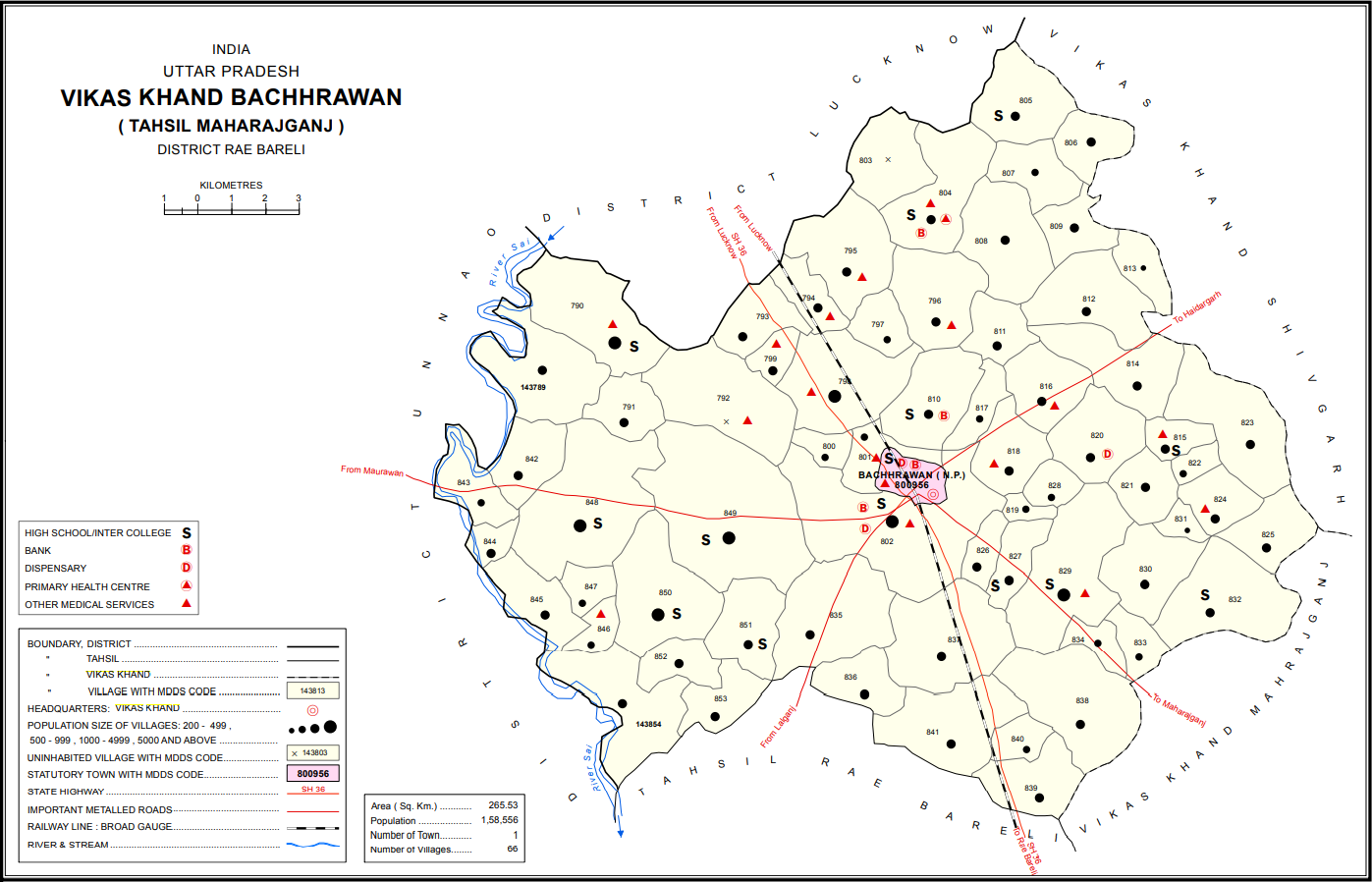
- Map showing Mahraura (#797) in Bachhrawan CD block

- Location in Uttar Pradesh, India
- Coordinates: 26.513649°N 81.097738°E
- Country India: India
- State: Uttar Pradesh
- District: Raebareli

Area
  - Total: 1.492 km^{2} (0.576 sq mi)

Population (2011)
  - Total: 905
  - Density: 607/km^{2} (1,570/sq mi)

Languages
  - Official: Hindi
- Time zone: UTC+5:30 (IST)
- Vehicle registration: UP-35

Mahraura is a village in Bachhrawan block of Rae Bareli district, Uttar Pradesh, India. As of 2011, its population is 905, in 180 households. It is located 5 km from Bachhrawan, the block headquarters, and the main staple foods are wheat and rice. It has one primary school and no healthcare facilities.

The 1961 census recorded Mahraura as comprising 4 hamlets, with a total population of 389 people (211 male and 178 female), in 82 households and 70 physical houses. The area of the village was given as 424 acres.

The 1981 census recorded Mahraura as having a population of 709 people, in 122 households, and having an area of 171.98 hectares.
