= Jalalpur, Bachhrawan =

Jalalpur Jalālpur
- Village
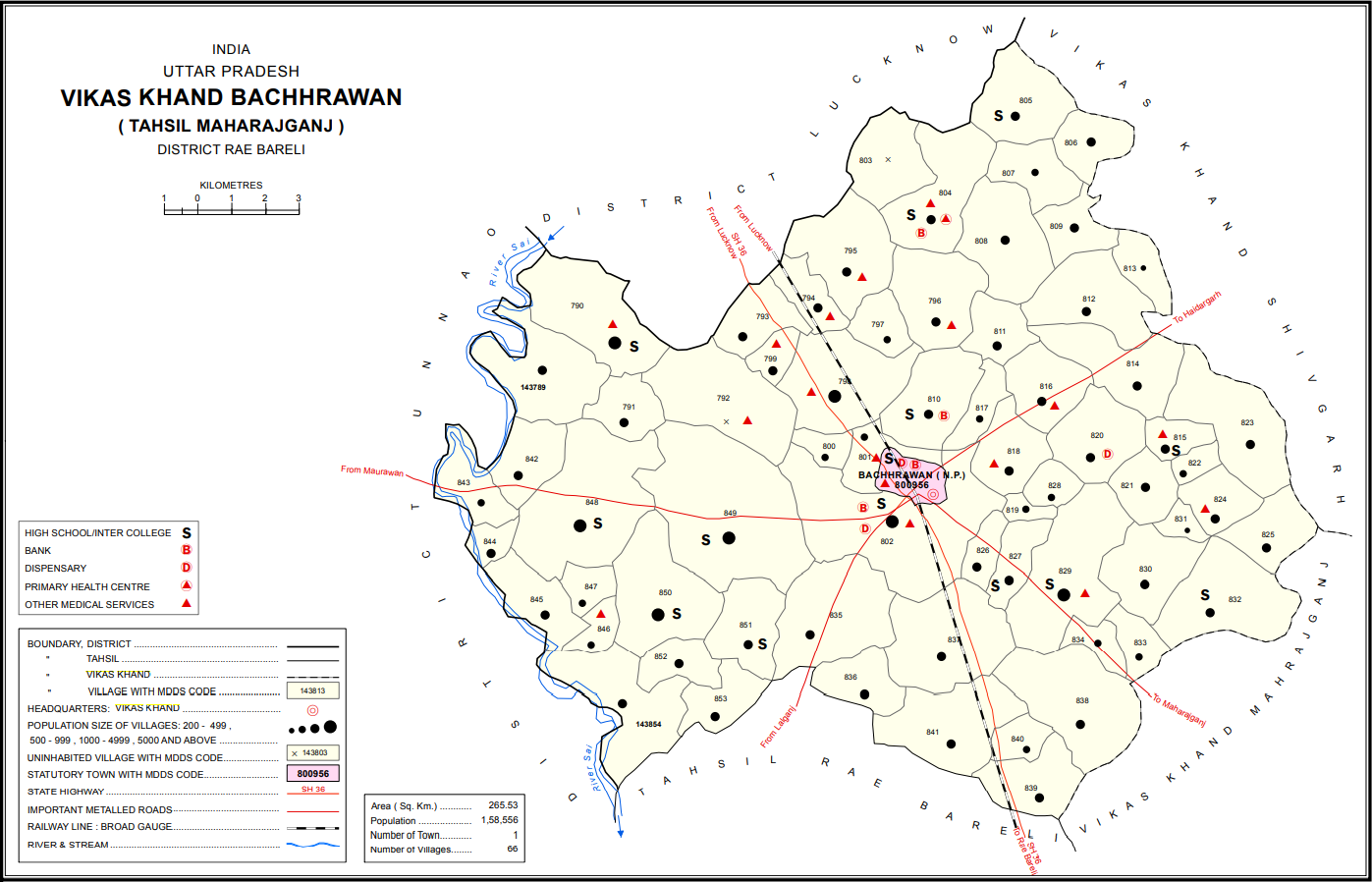
- Map showing Jalalpur (#826) in Bachhrawan CD block

- Location in Uttar Pradesh, India
- Coordinates: 26.45643°N 81.126318°E
- Country India: India
- State: Uttar Pradesh
- District: Raebareli

Area
  - Total: 1.713 km^{2} (0.661 sq mi)

Population (2011)
  - Total: 1,742
  - Density: 1,017/km^{2} (2,634/sq mi)

Languages
  - Official: Hindi
- Time zone: UTC+5:30 (IST)
- Vehicle registration: UP-35

Jalalpur is a village in Bachhrawan block of Rae Bareli district, Uttar Pradesh, India. As of 2011, its population is 1,742, in 354 households. It is located 2 km from Bachhrawan, the block headquarters, and the main staple foods are wheat and rice.

The 1961 census recorded Jalalpur as comprising 6 hamlets, with a total population of 749 people (422 male and 327 female), in 171 households and 130 physical houses. The area of the village was given as 430 acres.

The 1981 census recorded Jalalpur as having a population of 943 people, in 190 households, and having an area of 175.22 hectares.
