= Ashan Jagatpur =

- Village
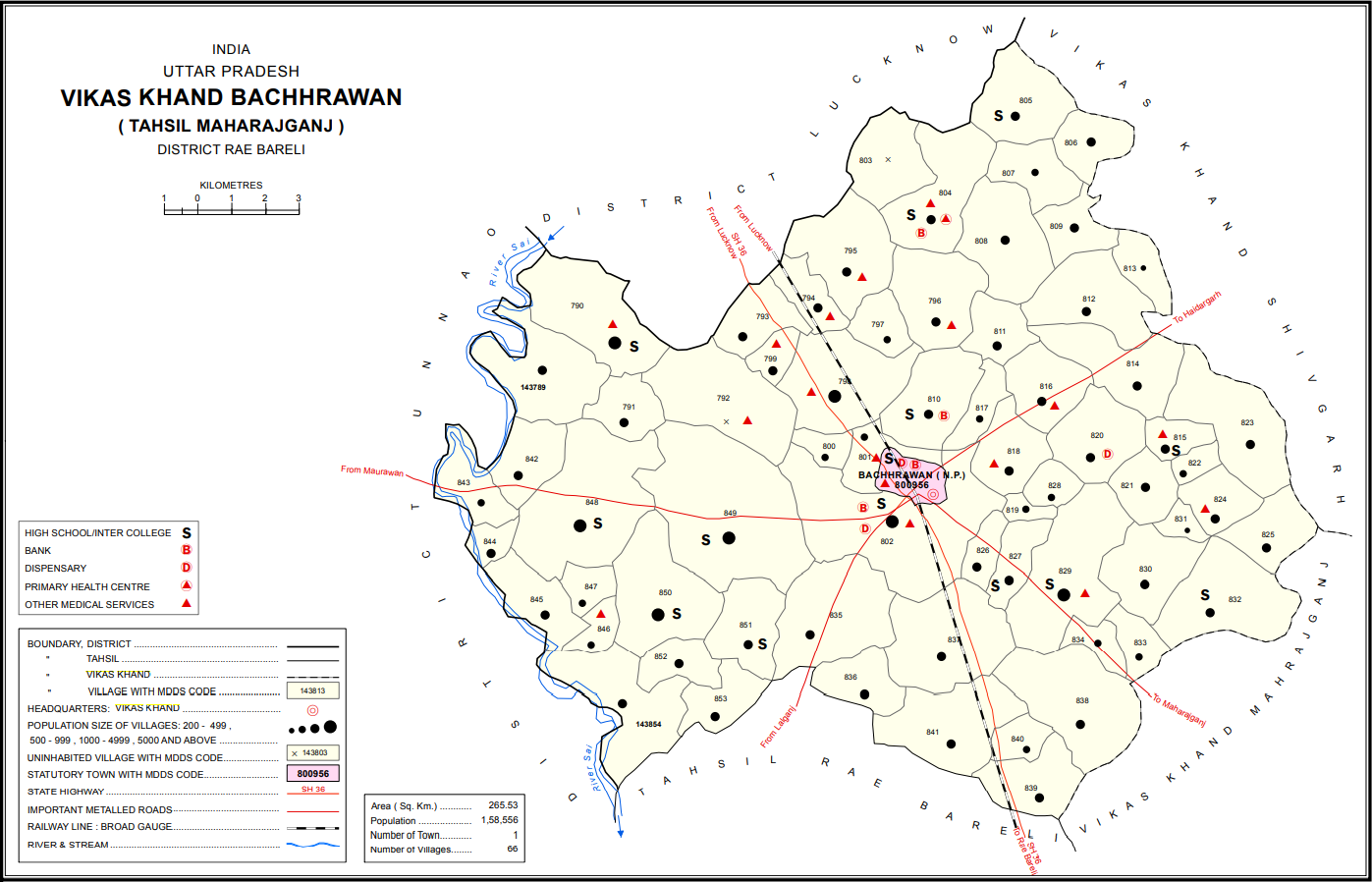
- Map showing Ashan Jagatpur (#823) in Bachhrawan CD block

- Location in Uttar Pradesh, India
- Coordinates: 26.481324°N 81.205478°E
- Country India: India
- State: Uttar Pradesh
- District: Raebareli

Area
  - Total: 6.701 km^{2} (2.587 sq mi)

Population (2011)
  - Total: 4,413
  - Density: 658.6/km^{2} (1,706/sq mi)

Languages
  - Official: Hindi
- Time zone: UTC+5:30 (IST)
- Vehicle registration: UP-35

Ashan Jagatpur is a village in Bachhrawan block of Rae Bareli district, Uttar Pradesh, India. As of 2011, its population is 4,413, in 905 households. It is located 12 km from Bachhrawan, the block headquarters, and the main staple foods are wheat and rice. It has two primary schools and no healthcare facilities.

The 1961 census recorded Ashan Jagatpur as comprising 13 hamlet, with a total population of 1,683 people (845 male and 838 female), in 355 households and 325 physical houses. The area of the village was given as 1,639 acres.

The 1981 census recorded Ashan Jagatpur as having a population of 2,201 people, in 464 households, and having an area of 662.47 hectares.
