= Dostpur, Bachhrawan =

Dostpur
- Village
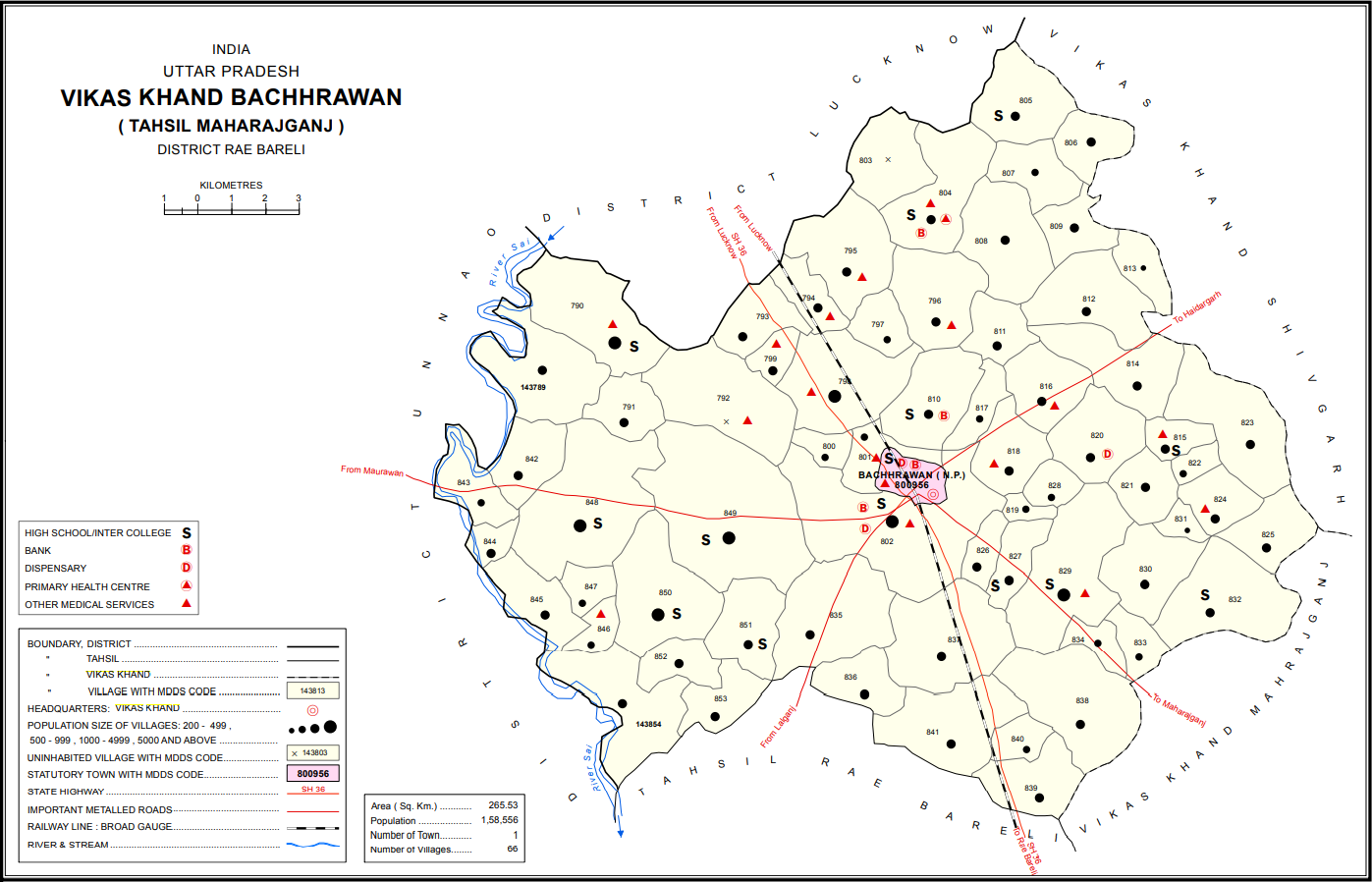
- Map showing Dostpur (#794) in Bachhrawan CD block

- Location in Uttar Pradesh, India
- Coordinates: 26.521935°N 81.081766°E
- Country India: India
- State: Uttar Pradesh
- District: Raebareli

Area
  - Total: 1.613 km^{2} (0.623 sq mi)

Population (2011)
  - Total: 1,790
  - Density: 1,110/km^{2} (2,870/sq mi)

Languages
  - Official: Hindi
- Time zone: UTC+5:30 (IST)
- Vehicle registration: UP-35

Dostpur is a village in Bachhrawan block of Rae Bareli district, Uttar Pradesh, India. As of 2011, its population is 1,790, in 315 households. It is located 6 km from Bachhrawan, the block headquarters, and the main staple foods are wheat and rice.

The 1961 census recorded Dostpur as comprising 3 hamlets, with a total population of 832 people (425 male and 407 female), in 180 households and 161 physical houses. The area of the village was given as 534 acres.

The 1981 census recorded Dostpur as having a population of 1,216 people, in 235 households, and having an area of 202.34 hectares.
