= Mallawan =

- Town
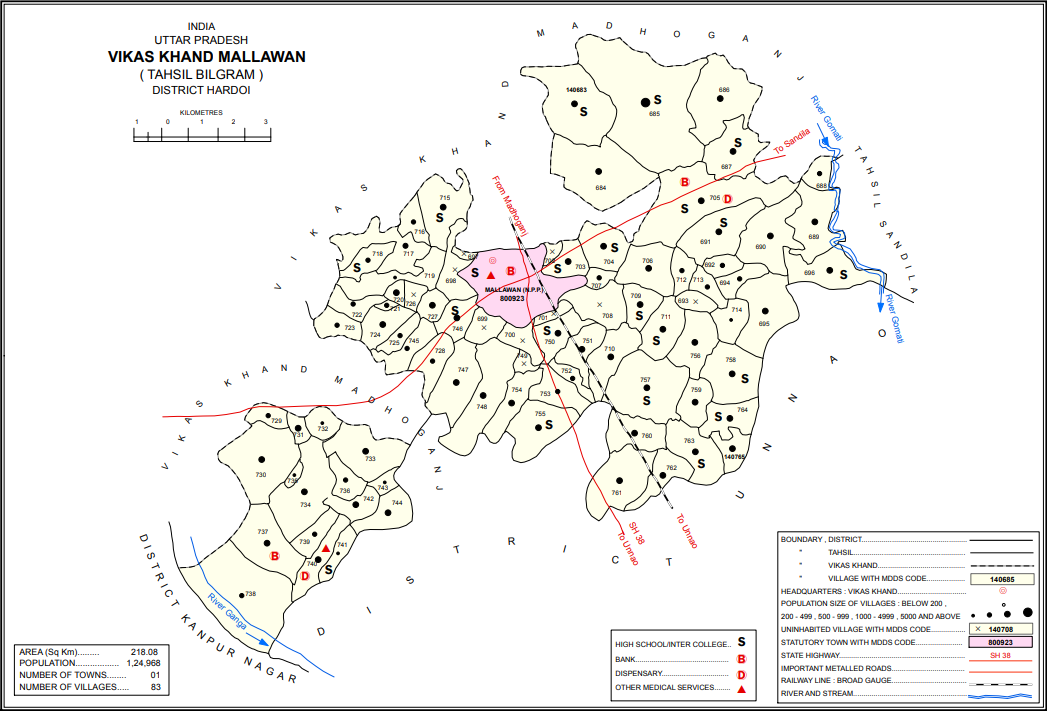
- Map of Mallawan CD block

- Location in Uttar Pradesh, India Mallawan (India)
- Coordinates: 27.0421°N 80.1483°E
- Country: India
- State: Uttar Pradesh
- Division: Lucknow
- District: Hardoi

Government
  - Type: Municipal Council
  - Body: Mallanwan Municipal Council
  - Municipal Chairperson: Tabassum (IND)
  - Lok Sabha MP: Ashok Kumar Rawat (BJP)
  - MLA: Ashish Kumar Singh (BJP)

Area
  - Total: 11.43 km^{2} (4.41 sq mi)

Population (2011)
  - Total: 36,915
  - Density: 3,230/km^{2} (8,365/sq mi)
- Time zone: IST
- Postal code: 241303
- Area code: 05851
- Vehicle registration: UP-30

Mallawan, also spelled Mallanwan is a town and Nagar Palika Parishad in Hardoi district of Uttar Pradesh, India. It served as the original district headquarters from 1856 to 1858. It is located south of Bilgram, on the road to Unnao. Mallawan is a major centre of handloom weaving, with handloom cloth being a major export. As of 2011, the population of Mallawan is 36,915, in 6,086 households. It is included in the legislative assembly constituency of Bilgram-Mallanwan.

== Geography ==
It is located at 27°2'8"N 80°9'6"E and its average elevation is 142 metres. The River Ganga passes Mallawan, touching its border with Kannauj. Mallawan is located 47 km south-east of Hardoi and 92 km from state capital Lucknow.

== Demography ==
Historical population
Year	Pop.	±%
1901	11,158	—
1911	10,757	−3.6%
1921	9,605	−10.7%
1931	10,150	+5.7%
1941	11,084	+9.2%
1951	11,508	+3.8%
1961	Not given	—
1971	Not given	—
1981	20,323	—
1991	26,922	+32.5%
2001	31,860	+18.3%
2011	36,915	+15.9%
Source: 2011 Census of India

Per 2011 census Mallawan had a total population of 36,915, out of which 19,404 (53%) were male and 17,511 (47%) female. It had a literacy rate of 68.71% & present literacy rate is 78.6%. It is divided into 25 wards. 57% of the population were Hindus, 42.5% were Muslims, and the remaining 0.5% belonged to other religions.

== History ==
It's possible that Mallawan was a Buddhist site at the same time that Kannauj was, given the short distance between them, but this is uncertain. An image of Asa Devi found in a temple here is "probably of Buddhist origin."

In early times, the Mallawan area was ruled by the Thatheras until they were driven out by the Chandelas (in the west) and the Kurmis (in the east). Then, in 1033, it was invaded by Ghazi Sayyid Salar Masud; the tomb of one of his companions is found in Mallawan, in the neighbourhood of Uncha Tola. According to tradition, Mallawan was once called "Ghazipur" in Masud's honour. Mallawan's Sheikh community claims to have originally come to the town at this time. Later, in 1544, three of the Sheikhs were given a grant in the neighbouring village of Mohiuddinpur by Sher Shah Suri, on the condition that they reside there, recite prayers five times daily in the mosque, and shooting ten arrows after reading the afternoon prayers.

The wandering saint Makhdum Shah, also called Misbah-ul-Ashiqin, came to Mallawan in 1415. His dargah is located here. Similar in style to that of Sadr Jahan in Pihani, it is clad with large kankar blocks, along with some sandstone, and it is crowned by a plain dome supported by 8 "richly ornamented" Hindu-style pillars. According to a book written in 1529 by one of his descendants, Makhdum Shah was invited to the imperial court at Delhi by Sikandar Lodi, but he declined and instead sent two of his followers. As a result, his follower Misbah-ul-Islam, a.k.a. Qazi Bhikari, was appointed qazi of Mallawan Pargana.

Mallawan is listed in the Ain-i-Akbari as the seat of a pargana. The town's jama masjid was built during Akbar's reign out of kankar blocks taken from an older building. By the turn of the 20th century, however, the mosque was described as being in ruins.

In 1726, Shitab Rai was made chakladar of Mallawan. He became infamous for acquiring property by burying landowners alive and then making their heirs sell it to him. According to the first British settlement report in the mid-19th century, the landowners' bones were still sometimes dug up by farmers around the old chakladar compound.

In 1765, Jesuit missionary and traveller Joseph Tiefenthaler visited Mallawan. He described it as a small but densely populated town surrounded by trees, with most buildings being made out of brick. There was a fort with towers, of mixed brick and mud construction, but by the early 1900s it had disappeared and the site had become farmland.

The 1773 treaty between the Nawab of Awadh and the British East India Company designated Mallawan as the site of a cantonment of British troops. The cantonment was by the road to Bilgram, in the village of Faizpur Kampu. It was in use until 1777, when it was moved to Kanpur, leading to Kanpur becoming a major city. Meanwhile, the Nawab had a military garrison in Mallawan itself until the 1850s.

With the advent of British Rule, followed by the annexation of Oudh in 1856, Mallawan was made district headquarter and possessed considerable political importance. During the struggle of 1857 the Raikawars, independence fighters from nearby village Rudamau, burned Mallawan's court house. Conditions worsened, leading to the move of the district headquarter to Hardoi.

At the turn of the 20th century, Mallawan was described as a very spread-out town, consisting of several villages agglomerated together. They were Mohiuddinpur in the north; Gangarampur, Mirzapur, Gobardhanpur, and Mallawan itself in the middle, and Bhagwantnagar in the south. Mallawan had seven muhallas at the time: Bhagwantnagar, Gurdasganj, Pathan Tola, Uncha Tola, Nasratnagar, Qazi Tola, and Chauhatta. The town had a police station, a post office, a cattle pound, an inspection bungalow, and a middle school, along with a Sanskrit patshala in Bajiganj. There was also a military encampment to the south of the road. Markets were held at Gurdasganj on Mondays and Fridays, and at Bhagwantnagar on Sundays and Wednesdays. Mallawan was not a major commercial centre at the time, although Bhagwantnagar was renowned for its dishes and brass spoons. The Man Devi fair, held in Kuar and Chait, then had an average attendance of about 4,000 people.

== Education ==
Mallawan is home to one of the oldest high schools in India, founded in 1857 by Ram Sahai Bajpai as Adarsh Shri Prasad Mahavidyalaya at Bajiganj. B.N.Inter College is also one of the oldest colleges, Its full name is Bhagwant Nagar Inter College. It is in Bhagwant Nagar.

== Notable people ==
- Brajesh Pathak – Cabinet Minister in Government of Uttar Pradesh.

== Villages ==
Mallawan CD block has the following 83 villages:

Village name	Total land area (hectares)	Population (in 2011)
Khangheria	610	3,694
Manjhgaon	638.7	3,219
Bansa	1,452.3	5,062
Kanthari	506.3	2,777
Nayagaon	304.6	2,180
Tarhatiya	123.6	702
Maghiyaee Zaferpur	369.2	1,550
Daroo Kuinya	344.7	1,994
Herwal	370.5	1,335
Visheshwarpur	173.4	666
Santapur	66.9	0
Bhasoorha	81.2	585
Bakhaura	416.3	2,490
Newada Paras	421.8	1,674
Nasrat Nagar	68.1	0
Bandipur	327.3	0
Shyampur	178.6	0
Bhagwant Nagar	160.1	0
Govardhanpur	78.1	0
Mirzapur	84.1	0
Tendua	374.5	2,686
Goswa	248.4	2,137
Purwawan	813.3	4,435
Bikapur	262.7	1,966
Newada Mahmood	162.2	575
Ganga Rampur	181.6	0
Darapur	281.6	1,485
Bharhwal Salempur	393.7	2,118
Barauna	284.2	3,077
Raghorampur	159.5	806
Bhagtoopur	108.2	861
Nasirpur	148.8	434
Ishwarpur Saee	375.3	3,577
Munwarpur	107.4	528
Islampur Jagai	436.8	3,054
Manimau	128.6	789
Daudpur	136.2	467
Menhdipur	185.5	1,059
Sumerpur	162	880
Mahneypur	123	919
Mirnagar	144.1	617
Lachhipur	181.6	1,378
Bhool Bhawanipur	96.6	941
Sadipur	41.4	0
Mustafabad	101.3	1,030
Sukroula	128.6	798
Ausanpur	96.8	578
Harraiya	422.2	1,923
Hazratpur	73.6	1,051
Dasraichmau	118.8	458
Puranmau	352.7	2,129
Beria Nazirpur	452.9	3,247
Sahimpur	25.8	370
Murtaza Kullipur	109.2	986
Shahpur Pawanr Sisala	429.7	3,836
Shahpur Pawanr Pansala	767.8	962
Rampur	126.6	920
Mansoor Nagar	211.8	1,771
Mahmoodpur	132.4	379
Kodarmau	136.1	1,104
Nekpur	60.6	222
Kokatmau	250.3	1,314
Khairuddinpur	182	757
Kalyanpur	129.1	1,402
Sunasi	258.7	1,188
Tejipur	645.6	3,606
Musepur	63.2	0
Barhuwan	338.8	2,966
Akbarpur	188	2,209
Sarai Gauri	69.8	985
Rajaypur	165.7	997
Shahabuddinpur	184.9	1,083
Shahpur Ganga	354.5	3,864
Teria Bhawanipur	409.7	2,035
Fulai	541.5	2,188
Ibrahimpur	376.4	2,901
Sarai Sultan	160.2	1,757
Parmi	206.7	1,423
Atwara Chak Kola	376.5	2,076
Jalalabad	159.4	3,848
Bjikharipur Katiya	316	1,380
Sultanpur Kot	243.3	1,389
Alapur	127.7	1,119
