= Ashok Bajpai =

Indian politician

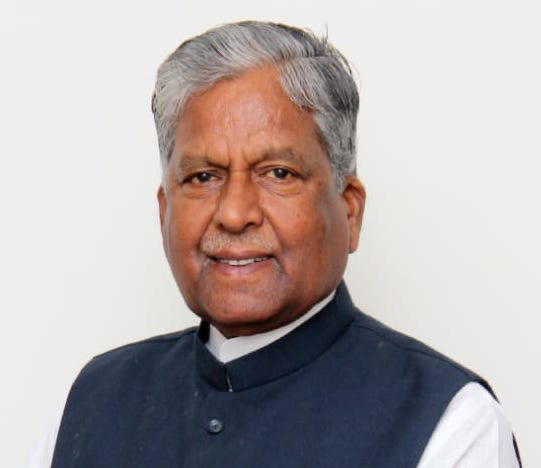

Member of Parliament, Rajya Sabha
- In office 2018–2024
- Succeeded by: Chaudhary Tejveer Singh
- Constituency: Uttar Pradesh

Member of Legislative Council, Uttar Pradesh
- In office 2016–2017
- Succeeded by: Dinesh Sharma

Personal details
- Born: 26 July 1949 (age 77) Budagaon, United Provinces, India
- Party: Bharatiya Janata Party
- Spouse: Dr Sudha Bajpai
- Children: Three Daughters
- Education: B.Sc., LL.B., M.A. (Public Administration & Political Science), Ph.D. (Public Administration)
- Alma mater: Lucknow University, Kanpur University, R.R. Inter College, Hardoi

Ashok Bajpai (born 26 July 1949) is a politician from Bharatiya Janata Party and member of the Upper House of Indian Parliament – Rajya Sabha. Bajpai has been active for 40 years in Indian Politics. He was elected on Six occasions Member of Legislative Assembly (MLA) from Pihani constituency in Hardoi district, Uttar Pradesh while losing three times in the same constituency over the period of 30 years. He was also a Member of Legislative Council (MLC) of Uttar Pradesh.

== Early life and education ==
Bajpai was born into a farmer's family in a small village in Uttar Pradesh. He was a National Cadet Corps (NCC) cadet in his school days, where he won a gold medal in shooting.

He completed his Bachelors in Science (BSc) from Lucknow University and then went on to do a Diploma in Public Administration. He holds double M.A. in Political Science and Public Administration. Bajpai's later chose Public Administration as a subject for his PhD as well. He is the author of the book entitled 'Panchayati Raj in India'. Bajpai also received a degree in law.

== Political journey ==
Bajpai became actively involved in politics as a student and started his political career with Akhil Bharatiya Vidyarthi Parishad. He was an active participant in the Jayaprakash Narayan Movement. He went to jail in June 1975 during the protest against the Emergency (India) and stayed in the jail as a political prisoner for a period of 19 months. After getting released from jail, he joined Janata Party and was appointed National Secretary of its Youth League in Uttar Pradesh. He has been elected to the Uttar Pradesh Legislative Assembly multiple times. He was elected to Rajya Sabha from Uttar Pradesh in March 2018.

- He first entered the Uttar Pradesh Legislative Assembly in the year 1977 on the Janata Party Janata Party ticket. He became the Minister for Higher Education and Hill Development.
- In 1985, Bajpai was re-elected to the Uttar Pradesh Legislative Assembly and was made the Chief Whip of that assembly.
- In 1989, he was Education Minister in the Uttar Pradesh Government.
- In 1992, he became a founding member of the newly formed Samajwadi Party and won with a wide margin in the state elections.
- In 1996, he once again became M.L.A from Hardoi.
- From 1998 to 2002, he successfully chaired the Lok Lekha Samiti (Public Accounts Committee) four times consecutively.
- In 2003, he was re-elected M.L.A from Hardoi district.
- In 2003, he held the office of Minister for Food and Civil Supplies in the Government of Uttar Pradesh .
- From 2004 to 2007 he was the Cabinet Minister for Agriculture and Religious Work .
- In 2016, he was elected to Uttar Pradesh Legislative Council. He resigned from the council in August 2017.
- In 2018, he was elected to Rajya Sabha from Uttar Pradesh.

== Published books ==
- Panchayati Raj in India – Two Volumes
- Panchayati Raj and Rural Development
- Role of Panchayati Raj in India
- U.P mein Gandhiji
