= Pali, Hardoi =

Pali
- Town
- Location in Uttar Pradesh
- Coordinates: 27.42°N 80.12°E
- Country: India
- State: Uttar Pradesh
- District: Hardoi
- Founder: Kings of Pal dynasty

Area
  - Total: 5.7 km^{2} (2.2 sq mi)

Population (2011)
  - Total: 18,708
  - Density: 3,300/km^{2} (8,500/sq mi)

Languages
  - Official: Hindi, Urdu, English
- Time zone: UTC+5:30 (IST)
- Postal code: 241123
- Vehicle registration: UP- 30

Pali is a town and nagar panchayat in Sawayajpur tehsil of Hardoi district, Uttar Pradesh, India. It is on the right bank of the Garra river, 20 miles northwest of Hardoi, Pali historically served as the seat of a pargana and was a regional political headquarters under the Nawabs of Awadh. The town's name is possibly connected to the Pal dynasty that once ruled the nearby city of Kannauj. As of 2011, the population of Pali is 18,708 in 2,949 households.

== History ==
In early times, Pali was ruled by the Thatheras, who inhabited the large ruined site called Sandikhera to the west of the modern town. The site was then conquered by Raja Satan, the Sombansi ruler of Satannagar (now Sandi). His son, Raja Harhar (also called Sheosal Deo), granted the place to a family of Gabrs or Kisans who held the office of mace-bearer at his court. However, they rebelled, and Harhar sought assistance to defeat them. He sent his purohit, Gyan Pande, to the Muslim garrison at Kannauj, where Gyan Pande's brother served as a risaldar. An army was sent under the command of Sheikh Mohi-ud-Din Usmani, the son of Haji Salar, to assist Harhar. They were successful, and as a reward, Gyan Pande, his brother, and Sheikh Mohi-ud-Din were each granted 500 bighas of land rent-free. The three of them cleared away a forested area by the riverbank and founded the present town of Pali, with the Hindu Brahmins in the north and the Muslim Sheikhs in the south. According to the traditional account, this happened at the end of the 12th century.

According to the qanungos of Pali, the town had served as the seat of a pargana ever since the Muslim conquest. The pargana existed since the time of Humayun in the 1500s, and it was later listed in the Ain-i-Akbari. The pargana then was much larger — it also included the entire later parganas of Shahabad and Pachhoha, as well as parts of Saromannagar and Katiari.

Under the Nawabs of Awadh, Pali served as the headquarters of the naib of the Sandi-Pali chakla. It lost this administrative significance under the British, and the Muslim neighbourhoods declined.

At the turn of the 20th century, Pali was described as a picturesque town with groves of mango trees all along its western outskirts. It consisted of four mohallas at the time: Qazi Sarai, inhabited by the Sheikhs; Maghrabi, inhabited by Pathans; the mohalla of the Maliks and Pathans; and the Hindu town, where Pande Brahmins predominated. There were seven mosques and four Hindu temples; one of the mosques had been recently built by Risaldar Imtiaz Ali and featured "very showy, florid" architecture. Pali had a police station, a cattle pound, a post office, and an inspection bungalow, along with an upper primary school with 105 students and a military encampment west of the road outside the town.

== Demographics ==
Historical population
| Year | Pop. | ±% |
|---|---|---|
| 1901 | 4,776 | — |
| 1911 | 5,062 | +6.0% |
| 1921 | 4,712 | −6.9% |
| 1931 | 4,920 | +4.4% |
| 1941 | 5,511 | +12.0% |
| 1951 | 5,440 | −1.3% |
| 1961 | Not given | — |
| 1971 | Not given | — |
| 1981 | 8,994 | — |
| 1991 | 12,279 | +36.5% |
| 2001 | 15,527 | +26.5% |
| 2011 | 18,708 | +20.5% |
Source: 2011 Census of India

As of the 2011 India census, Pali had a population of 18,708. Males constituted 52.64% of the population and females constituted 47.35%. Pali had an average literacy rate of 87%, which was higher than the national average of 74%. Literacy for males was 91% and 85% for females. 11% of the population was under 6 years of age.
