= Kurseli =

- Populated place
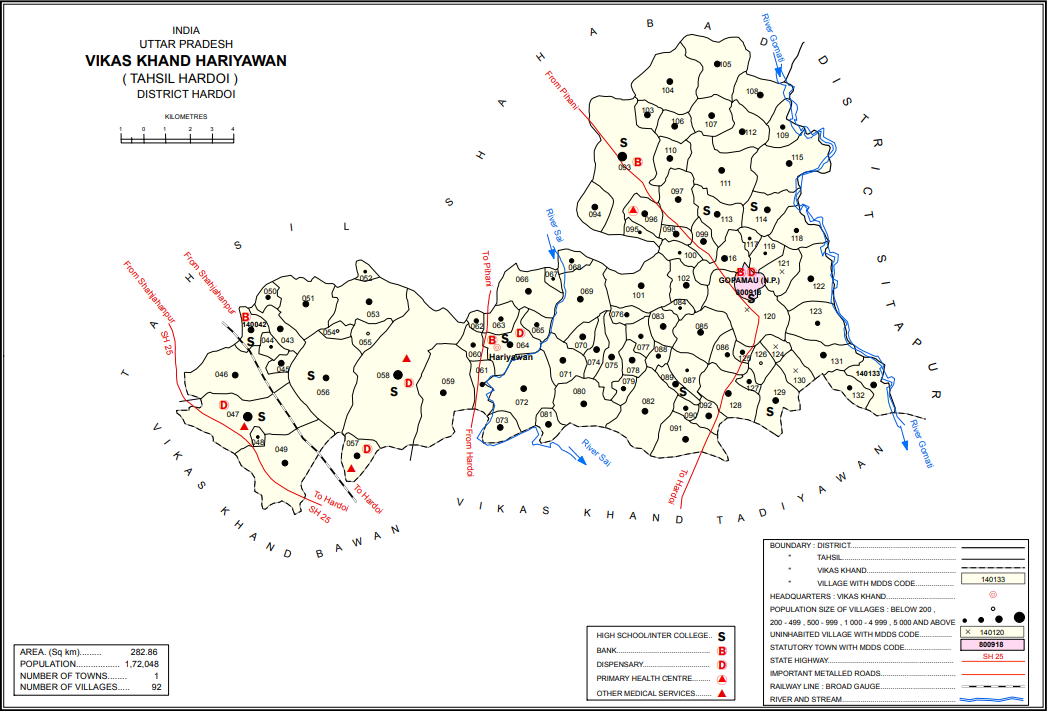
- Map showing Kurseli (#058) in Hariyawan CD block

- Location in Uttar Pradesh, India Kurseli (India)
- Coordinates: 27.53341°N 80.139024°E
- Country: India
- State: Uttar Pradesh
- District: Hardoi

Area
  - Total: 18.963 km^{2} (7.322 sq mi)

Population (2011)
  - Total: 10,404
  - Density: 548.65/km^{2} (1,421.0/sq mi)

Languages
  - Official: Hindi
- Time zone: UTC+5:30 (IST)

Kurseli is a large village in Hariyawan block of Hardoi district, Uttar Pradesh, India. It is located north of the city of Hardoi, to the west of the main road to Pihani. Kurseli hosts a market on Mondays and Thursdays, and the main staple foods are wheat and rice. It has several schools and one clinic, along with five practitioners of traditional medicine. The village lands extend a long way to the south, and include a chain of jhils that ultimately drain into the Sai river. As of 2011, the population of Kurseli is 10,404, in 1,936 households.

== History ==
Kurseli is said to have been founded around 1500 by two Chamar Gaurs named Diwan Singh and Jagat Singh, who were descended from one Kuber Sah, who had previously conquered the area from the Thatheras. Around the turn of the 20th century, Kurseli belonged to the pargana of Sara South, and it was the largest settlement in the pargana. There was a small bazaar here at the time, but other than that it was mostly an agricultural settlement. Its population in 1901 was recorded as 2,503, with about half of the residents belonging to the Pasi caste.

The 1961 census recorded Kurseli as comprising 14 hamlets, with a total population of 4,118 (2,225 male and 1,893 female), in 819 households and 620 physical houses. A total of 511 residents (471 male and 40 female) were able to read and write. The area of the village was given as 4,619 acres.

The 1981 census recorded Kurseli as having a population of 5,795, in 1,242 households, and covering an area of 1,869.30 hectares.
