= Sahajanpur =

Sahjanpur
- Village
- Nickname: Sajjanpur
- Location in Uttar Pradesh, India Sahjanpur (India)
- Coordinates: 27.488109°N 79.835916°E
- Country: India
- State: Uttar Pradesh
- District: Hardoi

Population
  - Total: 4,000

Languages
  - Official: Hindi
- Time zone: UTC+5:30 (IST)
- PIN: 241123
- Telephone code: 05853
- Vehicle registration: -
- Literacy: 95%
- Lok Sabha constituency: Hardoi
- Vidhan Sabha constituency: Sawayajpur
- Website: http://www.sahjanpur.in

Sahajanpur is a village and gram panchayat in Hardoi district, Uttar Pradesh, India. The village has several public and many private educational institutions. Attraction of village is Shivalaya, which is an ancient temple here to visit.

== Demographics ==
The population of Sahajanpur was 2000 as per 2011 census of India which has increased to 3000 in 2011. As of June 2014, the population is 4000. .

== Education system ==
There are three primary schools in Sahjanpur.
