= Udhranpur =

- Populated place
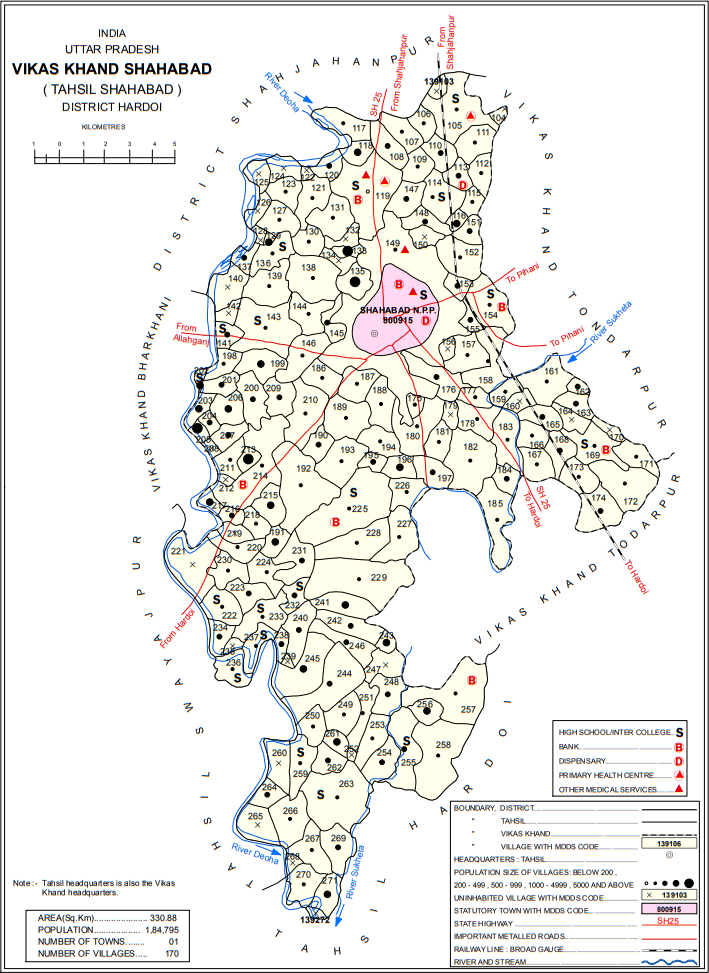
- Map showing Udhranpur (#149) in Shahabad block

- Location in Uttar Pradesh, India Udhranpur (India)
- Coordinates: 27.693293°N 79.928433°E
- Country: India
- State: Uttar Pradesh
- District: Hardoi

Area
  - Total: 6.297 km^{2} (2.431 sq mi)

Population (2011)
  - Total: 5,021
  - Density: 797.4/km^{2} (2,065/sq mi)

Languages
  - Official: Hindi
- Time zone: UTC+5:30 (IST)

Udhranpur is a village in Shahabad block of Hardoi district, Uttar Pradesh, India. It is located a bit north of Shahabad on the main Hardoi-Shahjahanpur road, just to the east of the river Garra. The village hosts a periodic haat and has several schools and one clinic. As of 2011, its population is 5,021, in 982 households.

== History ==
Around the turn of the 20th century, Udhranpur was described as a large village in the pargana and tehsil of Shahabad. Its population as of the 1901 Census was 1,985 people, including 115 Muslims and 144 Christians, and a large Brahmin community among the Hindu majority. The village was held in zamindari tenure and hosted markets twice a week, and there was a post office and large upper primary school. The local indigo factory, formerly owned by Europeans, had by that point come under the joint ownership of Pandit Lajja Ram and other local Brahmin proprietors.
