= Mohammad Israil Ansari =

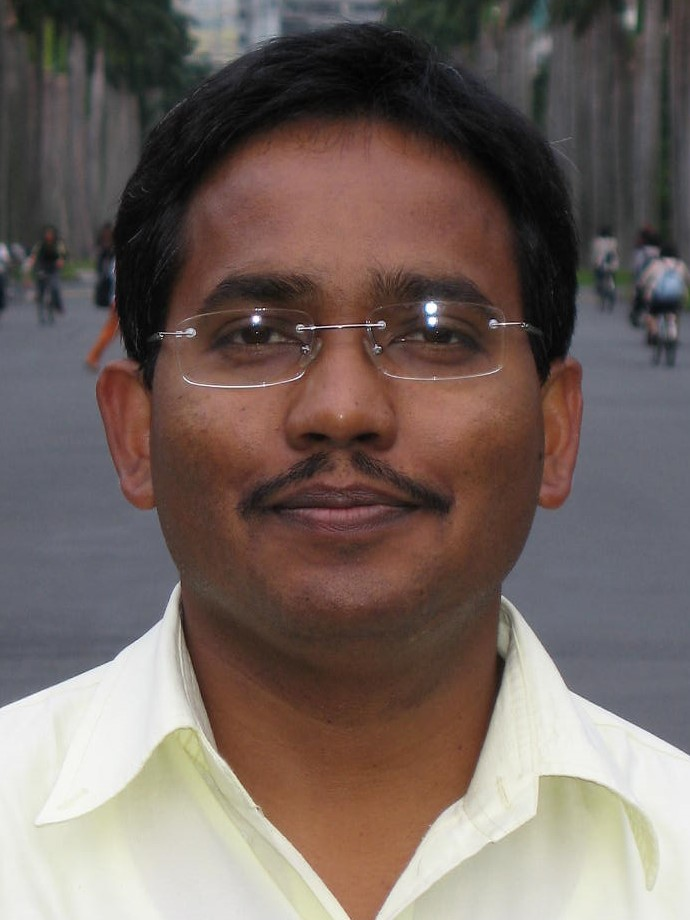
- Ansari in 2000
- Born: June 7, 1969 (age 57); Hardoi, Uttar Pradesh, India
- Occupations: Professor at University of Lucknow, Lucknow, India
- Awards: Academia Sinica Fellow by the Government of Taiwan

Academic background
- Education: Aligarh Muslim University

Academic work
- Institutions: University of Lucknow, Lucknow, India
- Main interests: Plant Stress Physiology, Nanotechnology and Molecular Biology
- Website: https://udrc.lkouniv.ac.in/department/ViewProfile?EId=45

Mohammad Israil Ansari (born 7 June 1969) is a Biologist and Professor in the Department of Botany at the University of Lucknow, Lucknow, India. He is known for his research contribution in the field of plant nanotechnology and molecular biology of leaf senescence. He has been recognized as an Academia Sinica Fellow by the Government of Taiwan and is also a Fellow of the Indian Botanical Society.

== Biography ==
Ansari was born in 1969 in Mallawan, a town in the Hardoi district of Uttar Pradesh, India. He completed his undergraduate and postgraduate studies at the Department of Botany, Aligarh Muslim University, Aligarh, India. He conducted his doctoral research at the Indian Institute of Sugarcane Research, Lucknow, earning a PhD from Dr. Ram Manohar Lohia Avadh University, Faizabad, India. He has been associated with the Institute of Plant and Microbial Biology at Academia Sinica, Taiwan, and the Graduate Institute of Plant Biology at National Taiwan University, Taiwan from 2000 to 2007. Prior to his current appointment as Professor in the Department of Botany at the University of Lucknow, Lucknow, he served as Professor at the Amity Institute of Biotechnology, Amity University, Lucknow Campus, India from 2007 to 2016. He is an editorial board member of several international journals as well as an active member of various academic and research committees. He has research collaboration with several international groups and has delivered numerous keynote and invited lectures at national and international levels.

== Professional profile ==
Ansari’s research focuses on characterizing the gamma-aminobutyric acid (GABA) gene in relation to rice leaf senescence and developing bioengineered GABA-functionalized nanoparticles to enhance the nutritional composition and physiological resilience of leafy vegetable crops, thereby extending their shelf life. His work utilizes the stress-alleviating properties of GABA to improve nutrient uptake, stimulate plant growth, and strengthen tolerance to various abiotic stresses. By integrating nanotechnology with plant metabolic pathways, his studies aim to optimize crop development, nutrient density, and overall plant health under challenging environmental conditions. He has over 33 years of research experience and 22 years of teaching experience, with more than 120 publications listed on ResearchGate, an online repository of scientific articles. His high citation index and h-index reflect the quality and impact of his research. Additionally, he has authored and edited several books published by Springer Nature and Elsevier, and has completed multiple research projects funded by the Government of India.

== Academic honors and fellowships ==
Ansari was awarded the National Science Council Fellowship in Taiwan in 2000 for a period of two years. In 2002, he received the Academia Sinica Fellowship, which he held for four years. Immediately following this, he was again granted the National Science Council Fellowship in 2004, this time for a period of three years. He has also received fellowships from the Indian Council for Agricultural Research (ICAR), New Delhi, India, in 1997, and from the Department of Biotechnology (DBT), Government of India, in 1993. In 2022, he was elected as a Fellow of the Indian Botanical Society. He is also a recipient of the Excellence Award from the Indian Society of Agricultural Biochemists in 2023 for his significant contributions in organizing the National Conference on Current Trends in Biological Sciences for Sustainable Agriculture, Environment and Health under Climate Change, and the XV Convention of the Indian Society of Agricultural Biochemists at the University of Lucknow, India.

== Selected bibliography ==
=== Chapters ===
- Jalil, S. U., & Ansari, M. I. (2020). Stress implications and crop productivity. Plant ecophysiology and adaptation under climate change: mechanisms and perspectives I: general consequences and plant responses, (pp. 73–86). Springer. DOI:10.1007/978-981-15-2156-0_3.

=== Articles ===
- Ansari, M. I., Lee, R. H., & Chen, S. C. G. (2005). A novel senescence‐associated gene encoding γ‐aminobutyric acid (GABA): pyruvate transaminase is upregulated during rice leaf senescence. Physiologia Plantarum, 123(1), 1-8. https://doi.org/10.1111/j.1399-3054.2004.00430.x.
- Ansari, M. I., Jalil, S. U., Ansari, S. A., & Hasanuzzaman, M. (2021). GABA shunt: a key-player in mitigation of ROS during stress. Plant Growth Regulation, 94, 131-149. https://doi.org/10.1007/s10725-021-00710-y.
- Ansari, M. I., Hasan, S., & Jalil, S. U. (2014). Leaf senescence and GABA shunt. Bioinformation, 10(12), 734. doi: 10.6026/97320630010734
- Iqbal, Z., Iqbal, M. S., Hashem, A., Abd_Allah, E. F., & Ansari, M. I. (2021). Plant defense responses to biotic stress and its interplay with fluctuating dark/light conditions. Frontiers in Plant Science, 12, 631810. https://doi.org/10.3389/fpls.2021.631810.
