= Ahri (disambiguation) =

Ahri is a League of Legends character. Ahri or AHRI may also refer to:

== Organisations ==
- Air Conditioning, Heating and Refrigeration Institute
- Australian Human Resources Institute, which publishes the Asia Pacific Journal of Human Resources
- Armauer Hansen Research Institute at ALERT (medical facility), Ethiopia
- Arts and Humanities Research Institute of the University of Hertfordshire

== People and fictional characters ==
- Abu Bakr al-Qutbi al-Ahri, Arab historian who served as the chronicler of Shaykh Uways Jalayir
- Ahri Raas, a character in the Fate of the Jedi
- Seo Ah-ri, a character in the 2023 South Korean television series Celebrity

== Places ==
- Ahri, Hardoi, a village in Ahrori, Hardoi district, Uttar Pradesh, India
