= Shahabad, Hardoi =

Shahabad
- City
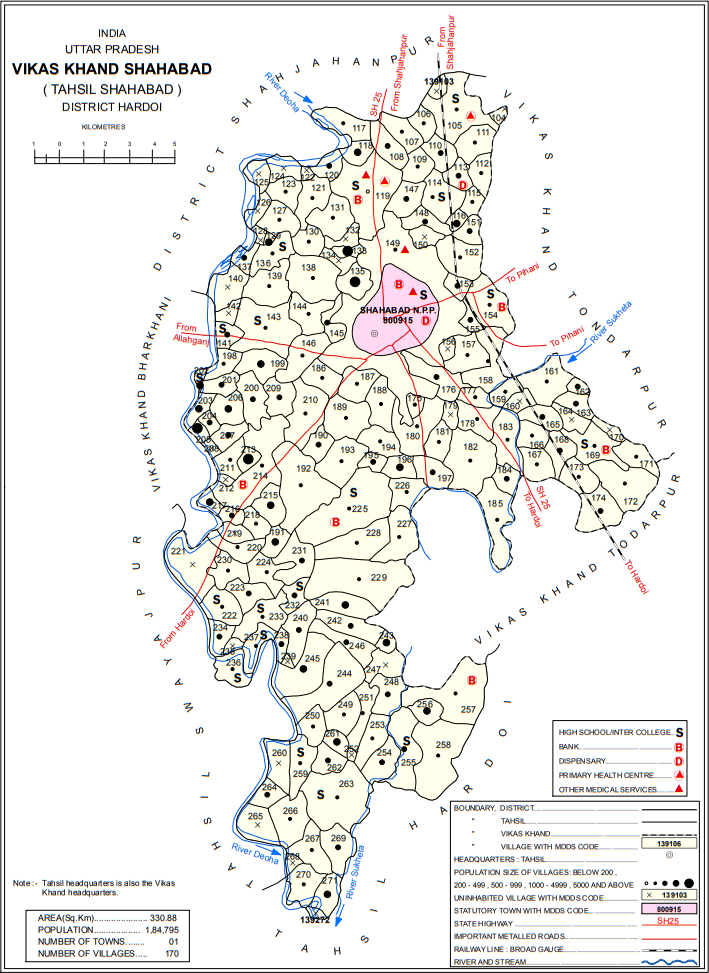
- Map of Shahabad CD block in Hardoi (UP)

- Location in Uttar Pradesh, India Shahabad (India)
- Coordinates: 27.65°N 79.94°E
- Country: India
- State: Uttar Pradesh
- Division: Lucknow
- District: Hardoi

Government
  - Type: Municipal Council
  - Body: Shahabad Municipal Council
  - Municipal Chairperson: Nasreen Bano (SP)
  - Lok Sabha MP: Jai Prakash (BJP)
  - MLA: Rajni Tiwari (BJP)
- Elevation: 133 m (436 ft)

Population (2021)
  - Total: 105,000

Language
  - Official: Hindi
  - Additional official: Urdu
- PIN: 241124
- Vehicle registration: UP-30
- Website: www.hardoi.nic.in

Shahabad is a city nearby Hardoi city and a municipal board in Hardoi district in the Indian state of Uttar Pradesh. At one point of time, it was counted among the few biggest cities of Oudh, but declined rapidly in the later years and reduced to a town. It is the site of the tomb of Diler Khan, a governor in the time of Shah Jahan and Aurangzeb.

As of 2011, the population of Shahabad is 80,226, in 13,958 households. It is the seat of a tehsil and a community development block. Important local industries include carpet weaving, building materials, and dairy products.

== History ==
According to a tradition recorded by Joseph Tiefenthaler in the 1700s, Shahabad occupied the site of a former village called Angadpur, after its founder Angad, the nephew of Rama. Modern Shahabad was founded in 1677 by one Nawab Diler Khan, a Pathan officer in the Mughal army, who had been sent to quell an uprising in Shahjahanpur. He overthrew the Pande Parwars of Angni Khera (which, according to H.R. Nevill, is probably the correct form of Tiefenthaler's "Angadpur") and was in turn granted their territory as a jagir, upon which he then founded Shahabad.

Diler Khan populated the new city of Shahabad with fellow Pathan kinsmen and soldiers, and many of the neighbourhoods of the city today bear the names of his followers. He built a brick palace at the centre of town, called the Bari Deorhi, which Tiefenthaler described upon his visit in 1770 as being "strengthened by towers like a fortress, with a vestibule and a covered colonnade." The palace no longer exists, although the two grand gateways are still standing. Diler Khan also built the city's jama masjid (congregational mosque) as well as his own mausoleum. Both of them are built out of dressed kankar blocks. The mausoleum's upper story contains bands of florid decoration in red stone, a style common to architecture of that period which can also be seen in the complex surrounding the Taj Mahal in Agra. He also built a grand pond near the mausoleum, known as Narbada.

Shahabad declined rapidly during the late 1700s, as Mughal power waned and was replaced in this region by the Nawabs of Awadh. Already by 1799, William Tennant described it as being in ruins. In 1824, Reginald Heber, Bishop of Calcutta, traveled to Shahabad and described it as a "considerable town or almost city with the remains of fortifications and many large houses."

The descendants of Nawab Diler Khan Daudzai also moved to a nearby area which under the zamindari and named this place as Wazirabad which is now known as village HARRAI, comes under Tehsil Shahbad, District Hardoi.

== Geography ==
Shahabad is located at 27.65°N 79.95°E. It has an average elevation of 143 metres (469 feet).

== Demographics ==
As of 2011 Indian Census, Shahabad had a total population of 80,226, of which 42,635 were males and 37,591 were females. Population within the age group of 0 to 6 years was 11,102. The total number of literates in Shahabad was 44,078, which constituted 54.9% of the population with male literacy of 60.6% and female literacy of 48.5%. The effective literacy rate of 7+ population of Shahabad was 63.8%, of which male literacy rate was 70.3% and female literacy rate was 56.3%. The Scheduled Castes and Scheduled Tribes population was 6,558 and 9 respectively. Shahabad had 13958 households in 2011.

== Villages ==
Shahabad CD block has the following 170 villages:

Village name	Total land area (hectares)	Population (in 2011)
Fatteypur Viran	40.4	0
Akhtiyarpur	42.4	0
Harrai	303.5	2,997
Ghurha	94.1	1,009
Agapur	161.3	1,557
Sardar	153.2	657
Jatpura	125.2	1,000
Gauriya	147.7	683
Hasnapur	199.2	1,438
Baripur	172.4	1,016
Kachoora	104.8	813
Aigawan	215.2	3,133
Nabipur	75.7	1,345
Nagla Bhag	69.7	482
Garheypur	214	1,379
Naseerpur	112.2	299
Udhranpur	629.7	5,021
Behta Kola	104.1	516
Purwa Pipariya	139.8	1,854
Piparia Purwa Pansala	48.9	0
Parial	163.5	1,461
Pariyal Pansala	132.9	0
Puranpur	93.8	0
Kalayara Pansala	63.2	0
Kala Gara	168.1	1,990
Umariya Dhani Pansala	28.2	0
Umariya Dhani	41.2	488
Firoozpur Khurd	140.2	1,177
Hiroli Kutub Nagar	255.2	1,857
Chiraiyan	127.4	0
Khulkipur	35.9	126
Chak Pihani	85.9	0
Jogipur	143	1
Birauri	273.7	1,491
Birauri Pansala	69.1	538
Narhai	325.8	2,462
Jhothupur	246	2,626
Jhuthupur Pansala	137.6	0
Newada	37.4	776
Basat Nagar Pansala	620	0
Basat Nagar	358	3,679
Bhadasi	168.6	1,629
Baburhai	119.8	563
Manikapur Bamiyari	260.6	1,231
Bhoora	177	609
Naya Gaon	106.4	597
Shahabad Dehat	1485.7	2,280
Karmullapur	92.8	0
Mishripur	113.2	857
Nagla Ganesh	266	1,494
Daulatpur Gangadas	72	865
Sikandarpur Kallu	331	2,630
Naurozpur	238.6	611
Kakrahai	0	0
Dayapur Bikku	198.6	1,958
Nagla Kallu	284.7	1,100
Mithnapur	92.3	1,426
Hathelia	74.6	0
Sharma	362.9	2,822
Fattepur Sheogulam	63.3	539
Jharsa Kesari	93.1	527
Pasigavan	125.9	1,070
Miyanpur	150.4	1,153
Husainapur Dhaukal	146.1	638
Saadat Nagar	261.4	2,871
Mainpur	68.4	0
Behra Rasoolpur	147.3	1,336
Paneora Ballia	402.6	2,073
Asgarpur	143.7	1,175
Sharah	246.2	628
Garhichand Khan	40.7	1,496
Mirpur Gannu	186	582
Kakar Ghata	141.8	2,323
Bilhari	196.1	1,272
Mangali Ganj	67.2	0
Nagla Lothu	284.2	2,144
Rampur Hirdai	129.3	1,494
Mangiawan	432.3	2,599
Hunseypur Lukman	263.7	1,906
Khwagjipur	122.3	638
Kodra Saraiya	306.3	2,106
Sahora	182.3	1,284
Lalpur	154.8	1,040
Manglipur	214.4	1,487
Tader	315.9	2,088
Kuiyan	122.2	822
Ghurhai	110.9	352
Agampur	550.8	2,660
Perhatha	276.2	1,284
Daulatiapur	191.4	1,220
Firoozpur Kalan	108	580
Kauharia	103	435
Sarai Kamaluddinpur	145.3	999
Kilkili	111.1	1,185
Pherwa	192.4	478
Hardaspur	159.7	649
Bari	118.8	743
Hajipur	57.7	323
Ganuapur	193.8	432
Singulapur	41.7	707
Singulapur Pansala	58.5	150
Rahi	150	277
Surapur	109.8	755
Surajpur Pansala	24.1	0
Gauhania	159.1	846
Gahora	378.1	2,645
Gujidei	125.3	1,491
Gujidai Pansala	11.6	0
Damgarha	85.6	117
Pareli	542	2,842
Piprola	180.8	399
Paharpur	68.4	572
Feerojpur Pansala	26.3	424
Atarjee Sisala	190.6	2,726
Atarjee Panchsala	376.2	0
Gopalpur	112.9	1,155
Gutka Mau Pansala	171.5	0
Gutka Mau	102.1	1,586
Khempur	141.6	561
Narsiya Mau	474.4	1,499
Sikandarpur Narkatra	638.7	3,074
Abdullapur	131.6	1,173
Sidhauli	261.9	1,194
Jasmai Kharona	685.2	1,666
Chandu Pur Khairai	642.1	2,666
Dariyapur Balbhadra	170.8	1,074
Jamalpur	155.8	695
Rasoolpur	133.7	599
Kachheliya	204	3,074
Kewalpur	133.3	847
Kachhelia Pansala	68.8	0
Khanupur	327.2	3,124
Baijoopur	100.2	1,234
Ali Hajipur	82.7	761
Shanarpur Pansala	34.4	0
Shankarpur	259.2	983
Mahamdapur	190.6	342
Palthua	211.5	918
Fattepur	40.4	283
Khanigawan Khurd	304.8	906
Biruapur	624.4	498
Khanigawan Kalan	132.6	920
Dariyapur	145.2	0
Barkhera	178.6	594
Nagla Khanpur	187.8	1,574
Thhehapur	140.3	1,057
Bihgawan	208.9	1,278
Bihgawan Pansala	7.5	0
Shahpur	202.2	1,595
Nau Nagla	206.6	701
Dhiarai	271.5	852
Isey Pur	112.6	268
Dalel Nagar	544.7	2,670
Rampur Hamza	479.2	2,143
Nasauli Gopal	195.6	3,438
Nasauligopaa Pansala	226.4	0
Gulraha	67	459
Raipur	142.4	945
Nasauli Damar	591	3,412
Fadnapur	140.7	647
Sakrauli Pansala	228.8	0
Sakrauli	224.4	2,062
Boota Mau	220.9	1,608
Boota Mau Pansala	56.6	0
Bakaura	199.3	842
Asalapur	175.8	1,359
Naga Mau	134.4	445
Naga Mau Pansala	45.7	0
