= Narpati Singh =

Zamindar of Hardoi, Uttar Pradesh, India

Narpati Singh was the zamindar of Hardoi, Uttar Pradesh, India, and a Raikwar chief.

== War with the British ==
He was from Madhoganj area of Hardoi district which is about two kilometres away from Ruia Garhi. At the time of Indian Rebellion of 1857, Ruia Garhi was the princess and her father Narpati Singh was the king. After most areas of Awadh were captured by the British, the British Army became in charge of Hardoi too. But soon in 1858, due to the rebellion of Narpati Singh, the British were ousted. Narpati Singh was a strategic planner and due to this, Hardoi once again came to under his rule.

But the British were not satisfied after losing the battle, therefore, in the fifth battle, the British army decided to fight in large number and even used cannon. Even in this battle, Narpati Singh and Ruia Garhi did not back down and arranged soldiers for the battle. But since the Britishers had advanced modern weaponry and a large number of soldiers, they were able to defeat Narpati Singh and Ruia Garhi and soon Hardoi came under the control of the Britishers.
