= Shivkumar Bilagrami =

Indian poet

Shivkumar Bilagrami (शिवकुमार बिलग्रामी) is a contemporary Hindi/Urdu Poet. He was born in the Bilgram Tahsil, Hardoi district of Uttar Pradesh. He has been regular poet in Delhi Circle Kavi Sammelans, Mushayara and Cultural Programmes.

== Early life ==
He was born in Village Mahsonmau, Tahsil Bilgram, Hardoi district of Uttar Pradesh. His father Late Shri Raghubar Singh was a political and social activist of this region. Bilagrami completed his schooling from BGR Inter College, Bilgram and later did his Masters in English Literature from Lucknow University, Lucknow.

== Career ==
He started his career as a Journalist and worked for several newspapers and news agencies.

He served in Parliament of India in various capacities with several dignitaries and after contributing 28 years of meaningful service in Lok Sabha Secretariat, New Delhi, he is supernuating as Joint Director with effect from 31 October 2023.

His first ghazal collection – Nai Kahkashan – was first published. After that, in the year 2018, his second Ghazal collection – Woh Do Pal – was published. This ghazal collection has received Adam Gondvi Samman from Uttar Pradesh Hindi Sansthan. More than 40 ghazals have been sung from this collection by many renowned singers from India and Pakistan including Famous singers like Shad Ghulam Ali, Riaz Khan, Rajesh Singh, Satish Mishra, Sarita, Nishant Daksh and Saksham have given their voice to his Ghazals.

One of his songs – Prithvi Manthan – has been sung by famous Odisha singer Susmita Das. This song has received many international awards including Golden Peacock. "Many of his bhajans including Shree Ganesh Stuti and Durga Stuti have been sung by Akhya Singh and released by Sanskar Music. His all popular Ghazals are available on different YouTube channels

== Publications ==
- Naee Kahakashan is a compilation of Gazals.
- Wo Do Pal is a compilation of Gazals.
