= Sursa =

- Populated place
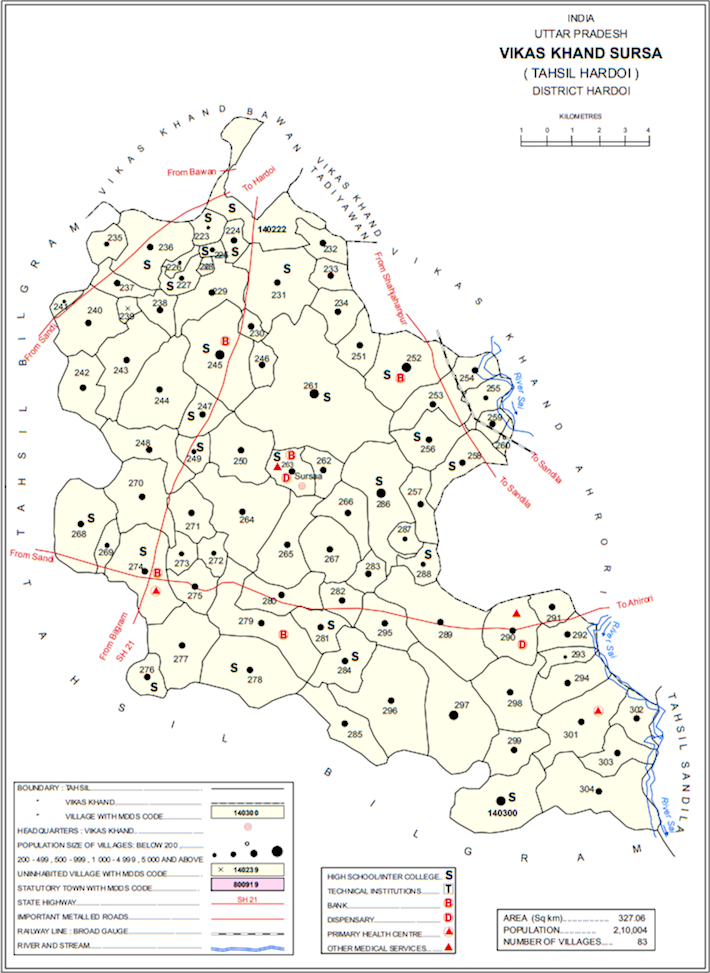
- Map showing Sursa (#263) in Sursa CD block

- Location in Uttar Pradesh, India Sursa (India)
- Coordinates: 27.285746°N 80.12764°E
- Country: India
- State: Uttar Pradesh
- District: Hardoi

Area
  - Total: 2.50 km^{2} (0.97 sq mi)

Population (2011)
  - Total: 2,157
  - Density: 863/km^{2} (2,230/sq mi)

Languages
  - Official: Hindi
- Time zone: UTC+5:30 (IST)

Sursa is a village and corresponding community development block in Hardoi district of Uttar Pradesh, India. Located 14 or 15 km from the city of Hardoi, the village hosts a market on Mondays and Thursdays. The village has two primary schools and one clinic. As of 2011, the population of Sursa is 2,157, in 373 households.

== Demographic history ==
The 1961 census recorded Sursa as comprising 1 hamlet, with a total population of 818 (431 male and 387 female), in 174 households and 127 physical houses. The area of the village was given as 636 acres.

The 1981 census recorded Sursa as having a population of 1,269, in 256 households, and covering an area of 257.39 hectares.

== Villages ==
Sursa CD block has the following 83 villages:

Village name	Total land area (hectares)	Population (in 2011)
Hardoi (Gramin)	877.6	2,936
Rajepur	131.1	479
Tans Khera	123.2	1,541
Barbatapur	48	562
Marhiya	47.8	380
Sikandarpur	165.3	798
Nanamau	37.5	0
Aseulee	380.9	2,125
Fardapur	109.7	1,650
Kasrawna	682.2	4,557
Bahloli	194.3	1,266
Sariyan	150.2	1,201
Ghosar	279.4	1,889
Akhnapur	135.1	977
Shahbuddinpur	635.7	4,843
Madhopur	179.7	2,049
Kauthaliya	168.4	1,389
Gurra	27.4	0
Sathra	518.2	3,423
Ghamoiya	64.9	470
Peng	367.6	3,199
Sarra	590.1	3,400
Joora	708.4	3,887
Bhadeicha	863.2	6,114
Deoriya	127.8	1,296
Dholiya	256.2	2,423
Bausra	461.4	2,274
Malihamau	152.8	855
Oeranevliya	470.1	3,569
Meuna Maheshpur	273.9	1,816
Lalpur	576.3	5,923
Singhua Mau	340	2,780
Kordwa	201.1	1,016
Abdulpur	168.4	719
Maina Mau	430.2	3,854
Bardaua	277.9	2,530
Pachkohra	332.6	2,674
Keharmau	150	1,553
Seharmau	44.5	181
Khaju Rahrn	2,125.4	16,921
Nevada	155	1,310
Sursa (block headquarters)	250	2,157
Turteepur	796.6	3,799
Umrapur	540.5	4,203
Sarsaiya	328.2	2,329
Bahraiya	270.4	1,500
Sugwan	568	3,805
Ramapur	101.3	622
Husiyapur	561.6	3,016
Kam Rauli	249.4	1,521
Bhitha	123.7	848
Mohakampur	124.4	701
Fatiyapur	669.8	4,841
Vira Himpur	257.6	2,021
Lalolee	159.1	1,111
Mona	611.7	3,736
Andhara	633	2,490
Tundwal	705.9	4,186
Dalelpur	427	2,212
Dahigawan	219.3	1,221
Tikari	270.3	2,362
Dhenni Tisaurn	378.2	1,437
Dahti Salukpur	376.3	3,125
Aincha Mau	376.3	3,125
Mayoni	813.8	5,363
Bhataura	238	559
Kairmar	176.5	793
Marsa	906.7	3,557
Arongapur	451.7	2,581
Hathiyai	157.5	1,179
Hardha	217.9	2,341
Bhawanipur	132.9	442
Gangapur	311.7	1,852
Mahura Kalan	364.9	2,156
Odra Pachlai	1,062.2	4,745
Sautera	927	6,047
Beekapur	755.2	4,004
Achra Mau	297.6	1,788
Pahnutera	657.6	5,072
Bannapur	682.7	3,059
Bhelawau	323.8	2,605
Matua	268.9	1,359
Sahoriya Bujurg	857.3	4,585
