= Muhammad Sajid Qasmi =

Indian Islamic scholar (born 1972)

Maulana, Mufti Muhammad Sajid Qasmi
- محمد ساجد قاسمی
- Born: Muhammad Sajid; 14 September 1972 (age 54); Umarsenda, Hardoi district, Uttar Pradesh, India
- Occupations: Islamic scholar, writer, translator, professor
- Movement: Deobandi

Academic background
- Education: Aalimiyyah (1995) and Ifta specialization (1996) – Darul Uloom Deoband; M.A. in Urdu Language and Literature, a Diploma in Journalism and Mass Communication, and a Certificate in English Language – Maulana Azad National Urdu University
- Alma mater: Darul Uloom Deoband; Maulana Azad National Urdu University

Academic work
- Discipline: Islamic studies, Arabic literature, Urdu literature, Journalism
- Institutions: Darul Uloom Deoband
- Notable works: Al-Qira'at al-Arabiyyah (4 volumes); TaDhiyyāt al-Salaf fī Sabīl-i-Tahsīl al-'ilm; Taiseer al-Insha (3 volumes); Masīrah Dar al-‘Uloom Deoband abara mi'atin wa khamsīn ‘āmā (2 volumes)

Muhammad Sajid Qasmi (born 14 September 1972) is an Indian Islamic scholar, writer, translator, and professor at Darul Uloom Deoband. He has written extensively in Arabic and Urdu on Islamic studies, history, and journalism. He has authored and translated several books and has contributed articles to academic and religious journals.

== Early life and education ==
Muhammad Sajid Qasmi was born on 14 September 1972 (5 Sha'ban 1392 AH) in Umarsenda, a village in Hardoi district, Uttar Pradesh, India. He began his education at Madarsa Mahmoodiya in his hometown and later studied Persian at Madarsa Kashiful Uloom in Pihani. He then enrolled at Jamiul Uloom in Kanpur, where he studied for four years.

In the early 1990s, he enrolled in Darul Uloom Deoband and graduated in 1995 (1416 AH). He then completed a specialization in Ifta (Islamic legal verdicts) at the same institution.

Alongside his Islamic education, he pursued further studies in modern disciplines. He earned an M.A. in Urdu Language and Literature, a Diploma in Journalism and Mass Communication, and a Certificate in English Language—all from Maulana Azad National Urdu University, Hyderabad.

== Career ==
After completing his education, Qasmi began his teaching career at Jamia Al-Quran wa Al-Sunnah in Bijnor and later at Madrasa Shahi in Moradabad. In 2002 (1422 AH), he joined Darul Uloom Deoband, where he continues to teach Arabic literature and Islamic sciences. In 1441 AH (2020), he was promoted to the position of a senior professor.

Apart from teaching, Qasmi has contributed to Islamic research, writing, and translation. His expertise in both Arabic and Urdu has allowed him to engage in Islamic scholarship and journalism. His research articles and essays have appeared in academic and religious journals, and he has contributed to the compilation of encyclopedic works on Islamic subjects.

Since 1441 AH (2019), he has been serving as the editor-in-chief of Al-Nahdah al-Adabiyyah, a quarterly Arabic magazine published by Al-Nadi al-Adabi, Darul Uloom Deoband.

== Literary works ==
Qasmi writes and conducts research on Islamic studies, Arabic language, and history. He has authored books, research papers, and journalistic pieces in both Arabic and Urdu. His articles have appeared in Al-Daie, as well as in Al-Raid, Al-Thaqāfah (Kerala), Monthly Darul Uloom, Nida-e-Shahi (Moradabad), Tarjuman-e-Darul Uloom Jadeed (Delhi), and other periodicals.

During his tenure at Madrasa Shahi, he was the editor of the Arabic monthly magazine Al-Thaqafah Al-Islamiyyah. His writings cover topics such as Islamic theology, history, and contemporary issues.

=== Books ===
His authored books include:

- Al-Qira'at al-Arabiyyah (in four volumes) – Co-authored with Abdul Quddus Qasmi Niranwi, designed for Arabic language learners.
- TaDhiyyāt al-Salaf fī Sabīl-i-Tahsīl al-'ilm – A study on the sacrifices of early scholars for knowledge.
- Taiseer al-Insha (in three volumes) – A textbook for Arabic composition and writing skills.
- Masīrah Dar al-‘Uloom Deoband abara mi'atin wa khamsīn ‘āmā (transl. The Journey of Darul Uloom Deoband spans over one hundred and fifty years in two volumes)

=== Translations ===
Qasmi has translated several classical Islamic texts between Urdu and Arabic, making them available in both languages. His translations cover topics such as Islamic theology, history, and scholarly discourse. Many of these works were first serialized in Al-Daie before being published as books.

His translations include:

Urdu to Arabic

- Hujjat al-Islam (The Proof of Islam) by Qasim Nanawtawi
- Radūd 'Ala I'tiradat-in Muwajjahah Ila al-Islam (Responses to objections against Islam) by Nanawtawi
- Al-Aqeedah Al-Islamiyyah: Shubuhat wa Rudūd (Islamic beliefs: Doubts and responses) by Nanawtawi
- Mahawarat fi al-Din (Proverbs in Religion) by Nanawtawi
- Al-Sahabah, Mada Yanbaghi an Nu'taqada 'anhum (The Companions, what should be believed about them) by Hussain Ahmad Madani
- Mawqif-u-Ali min al-Khulafa al-Thalatha (Ali's position on the first three caliphs) by Abd al-Shakūr Lakhnawi

Arabic to Urdu

- Al-Islam fi Nazar A'lam al-Gharb (Islam in the Eyes of Western Notables) by Hussain Abdullah Basalamah
- Al-Hadiyyah Al-Sunniyyah fi Dhikr Al-Madrasah Al-Deobandiyyah (The Radiant Gift in the Mention of the Deobandi School) by Zulfiqar Ahmad Deobandi
