= Algawan railway station =

Railway station in Uttar Pradesh, India

General information
- Location: Hardoi, Saharanpur, Uttar Pradesh; India
- Coordinates: 29.9613°N 77.5411°E
- Elevation: 151 metres (495 ft)
- Operator: North Central Railway

Construction
- Structure type: Standard (on-ground station)
- Parking: Yes

Other information
- Status: Functioning
- Station code: AIG
- Zone(s): North Central Railway
- Division(s): Moradabad
Location
- Location within India Location within Uttar Pradesh

Algawan railway station (station code AIG) is a small railway station located in Hardoi, Saharanpur in the Indian state of Uttar Pradesh. It belongs to North Central Railway, Moradabad. Nearby major railway station is Bareilly Junction railway station and airport is Amausi.

== See also ==
- Northern Railway zone
- Hardoi
- Saharanpur Junction railway station
