= Pihani =

- Town
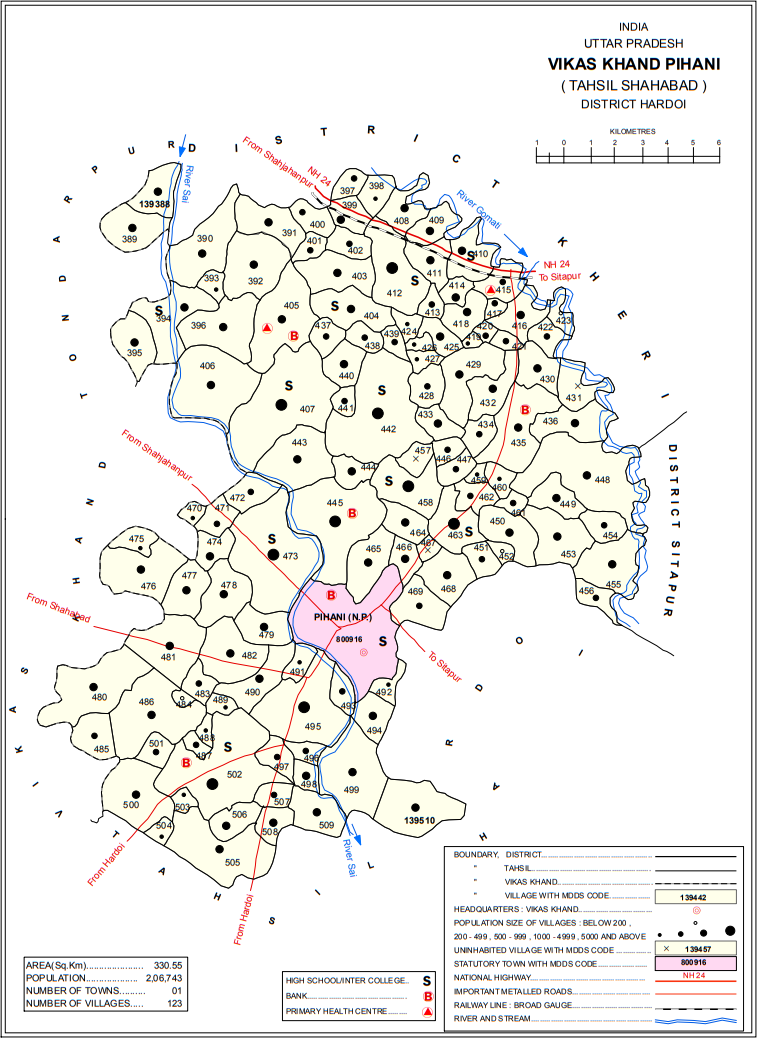
- Map of Pihani CD block

- Location in Uttar Pradesh, India Pihani (India)
- Coordinates: 27.619866°N 80.203426°E
- Country: India
- State: Uttar Pradesh
- Division: Lucknow
- District: Hardoi

Government
  - Type: Municipal Council
  - Body: Pihani Municipal Council
  - Municipal Chairperson: Shaheen Begum (SP)
  - Lok Sabha MP: Jai Prakash (BJP)
  - MLA: Rajni Tiwari (BJP)

Area
  - Total: 5 km^{2} (1.9 sq mi)
- Elevation: 141 m (463 ft)

Population (2011)
  - Total: 36,014
  - Density: 7,200/km^{2} (19,000/sq mi)

Languages
  - Official: Hindi
- Time zone: UTC+5:30 (IST)
- Postal code: 241406
- Vehicle registration: UP-30
- Website: pihaninpp.in

Pihani is a town and nagar palika parishad (municipal board) in Hardoi district of Uttar Pradesh, India. Historically, the city was a centre of sword production, leading to at least one British writer calling it "the Damascus of Oudh". Today, important industries in Pihani include jaggery and woven carpets. As of 2011, the town's population is 36,014, in 5,626 households. Pihani also serves as the headquarters of a community development block in Shahabad tehsil.

== Geography ==
Pihani is located at 27.63°N 80.2°E. It has an average elevation of 141 metres (462 feet).

== Demographics ==
Historical population
Year	Pop.	±%
1901	7,616	—
1911	5,963	−21.7%
1921	7,446	+24.9%
1931	8,107	+8.9%
1941	13,101	+61.6%
1951	10,360	−20.9%
1961	10,716	+3.4%
1971	13,511	+26.1%
1981	16,375	+21.2%
1991	21,047	+28.5%
2001	27,545	+30.9%
2011	36,014	+30.7%
Source: 2011 Census of India

As of 2001 India census, Pihani had a population of 27,535. Males constitute 52% of the population and females 48%. Pihani has an average literacy rate of 46%, lower than the national average of 59.5%: male literacy is 53%, and female literacy is 38%. In Pihani, 19% of the population is under 6 years of age.

== Transport ==
Pihani is well connected with Hardoi City . Government and private buses are available for Hardoi, Lucknow, Kanpur and Delhi.

== History ==
There are two different accounts of the founding of Pihani. The first, traditionally told by Hindu locals, holds that Pihani was originally settled by Dube Brahmins from Kannauj. They had supposedly been invited by Raja Lakhan Sen, a Gaur king who had conquered the fort of Simaurgarh (near Mansurnagar) from the Thatheras. The Muslim account, on the other hand, says that Pihani was founded by Sayyid Abdul Ghafur, who served as qazi of Kannauj under the Mughal emperor Humayun. In 1540, after Humayun's defeat by Sher Shah Suri, Abdul Ghafur refused to acknowledge Sher Shah's rule and left Kannauj to take shelter in the jungle where Pihani now stands. The name "Pihani" is thus said to derive from the word pinhani, meaning "concealment".

One of the main historical monuments in Pihani is the ornate tomb of Nawab Sadr Jahan, who served as a minister under Akbar. It consists of a double dome supported by red sandstone pillars, while the surrounding area is shaded by large tamarind trees. An inscription in Persian says that the tomb's construction began in 1071 AH and finished 10 years later. Sadr Jahan's son, Badr-i-Alam, is also buried here. Another monument is the ruined fort of Nizam Murtaza Khan (Badr-i-Alam's son); its western gate is still extant, as are the high walls built of kankar blocks.

Under the Nawabs of Awadh, Pihani was renowned for the quality of its sword blades. It also produced woven turbans (aka dastars), but both of these industries had declined by the turn of the 20th century.

At the turn of the 20th century, Pihani was described as having two distinct quarters named Bari Pihani and Chhoti Pihani. Bari Pihani was older and more run-down at the time, while Chhoti Pihani, or Nizampur, had been founded by Nizam Murtaza Khan and was more prosperous, with many trees providing shade. Pihani remained a minor commercial centre, with a police station, post office, cattle pound, and several schools: one middle school, a lower primary school for boys, and two lower primary schools for girls.

== Economy ==
As of 1971, the economy of Pihani was described as dominated by primary activities. The main items imported were cloth, groceries, and kerosene oil. The main items manufactured were handloom, shoes, and agricultural implements. The biggest exports were cane sugar, paddy, and wheat.

== Villages ==
Pihani CD block has the following 123 villages:

Village name	Total land area (hectares)	Population (in 2011)
Sakara	218.6	1,005
Rari	324.4	1,395
Bandraha	472.6	4,200
Kunwarpur Baghela	279.4	1,632
Saravar	469.6	2,382
Mahmoodpur Khurd	88.1	370
Sahijana	452	2,390
Santarha	273.1	1,092
Korigawan	486.1	1,985
Baherma	100.3	757
Jalalpur	117.5	446
Del Pandarwa	166.8	1,155
Mahmoodpur Bhagat	140	826
Hariharpur	89.1	634
Saidapur	129.6	651
Jarauna	361.7	2,342
Kunwarpur Baseet	333.6	2,206
Raigain	596.3	3,912
Bari	683	1,963
Abdulla Nagar	1,057.5	7,152
Ambari	232.7	2,005
Dhamapur	183.4	1,315
Deomalpur	269.2	1,577
Hannpasigawan	183.7	2,208
Mahmoodpur Saraiyan	476.4	5,435
Pipri	83	760
Bhethua	101	1,098
Jahani Khera	175.8	506
Darra	204.1	1,452
Sindauriya	69.4	696
Manikapur	178.9	1,290
Paharpur	26.7	261
Hajipur	53.2	594
Salempur	59.6	822
Bukharpur	149.8	503
Mooseypur	66.8	64
Anjana	82.5	337
Peerpur	122.1	1,269
Babakkarpur	49.6	383
Shahpur Shukul	94.7	493
Bharona	159.7	886
Gajua Khera	417	3,125
Jajupara	233.8	3,343
Muridpur	244.4	0
Usmanpur	223.5	1,217
Damgarha	142.3	1,255
Baddapur	130	894
Saadat Nagar	502.6	3,917
Anda Barahimpur	305	1,989
Gauria	134.5	706
Kaimpur	108.5	763
Dateonapur	105.1	773
Nari Khera	179.5	1,440
Newada	66.2	844
Rabha	1,755	7,915
Sarehjoo	511.2	3,931
Mahelia Khera	143.6	1,027
Bazid Nagar	849	5,323
Khizar Nagar	66.2	701
Magrapur	167.6	896
Rasoolpur	923.9	4,669
Bahadur Nagar	188.7	1,313
Kotra	245.2	1,573
Bhiria	122	722
Amtalia	45.8	145
Rajuapur	373	2,149
Lohar Khera	166	649
Hindu Nagar Chirahula	407.8	1,746
Kulhawar	131	793
Urdahiya	90.4	0
Dahelia	403.5	6,035
Kangoiya	33.2	344
Pataun Misra	81.1	477
Barkheria	92.5	643
Chathia Buzurg	124.1	666
Pandarwa	329.6	5,043
Kursanda	172.7	1,040
Shahpur Saida	334.7	2,388
Nipania	146	1,029
Kunwarpur Prithivi Nath	40.7	0
Nardhira	275.6	1,573
Harrai Pipri	281.1	861
Ismailpur, Pihani	60.6	340
Nizampur	131.2	553
Aintha Khera	148.4	784
Itara	1,085.6	5,015
Patras	175.5	1,073
Sahora	128.6	292
Bijgawan	464.3	2,540
Rasoolapur	282.7	1,441
Tavakkalpur	343.1	2,623
Jamuhi	269.1	1,880
Rampur Kora	661.6	2,955
Ahemi	464.2	2,297
Simaur	477.2	2,919
Padra	119.1	948
Hasnapur Grant	27	175
Samthari	190.2	989
Chandeli	693.9	3,911
Machheta	97.4	579
Sarora	78.9	420
Sujauli	60	231
Amirta Chauki	289.5	1,957
Barhaiya Khera	81.3	378
Lodhna Khera	58.2	428
Santarha	160.9	894
Chhataiya	210.2	1,528
Karim Nagar	763.8	5,014
Jalalpur	84.6	510
Hariharpur	79.8	650
Kuiyan	164.3	1,775
Umarsenda	588.2	4,274
Uchaul	503.2	1,947
Fatteypur	116.5	640
Mansoor Nagar	934.2	5,603
Para	60.1	307
Barkhera Grant	55.4	408
Arua	634.9	4,120
Bhiti Newada	200	1,667
Puraila	108.9	689
Bilhari	158.3	1,110
Nedura	277.4	2,274
Bela Kapoorpur	411.8	2,239
