= Behadar =

Behadar Behadar Kala
- Populated place
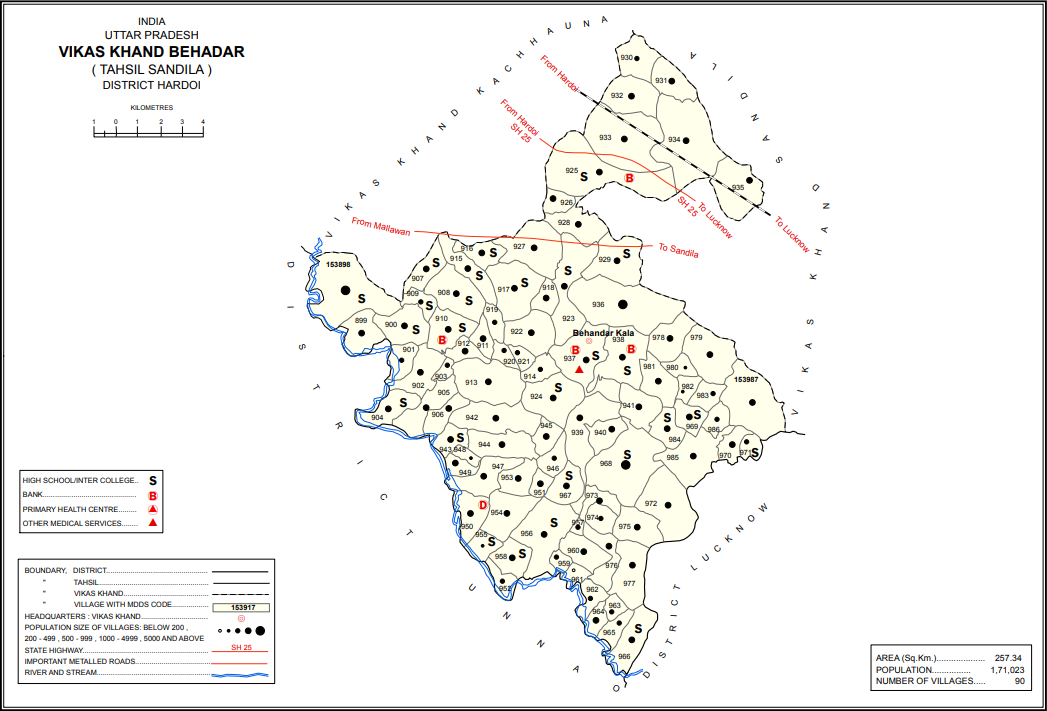
- Map showing Behadar (#937) in Behadar CD block

- Location in Uttar Pradesh Behadar (India)
- Coordinates: 27.024°N 80.412°E
- Country: India
- State: Uttar Pradesh
- District: Hardoi

Area
  - Total: 5.996 km^{2} (2.315 sq mi)

Population (2011)
  - Total: 4,458
  - Density: 743.5/km^{2} (1,926/sq mi)

Languages
  - Official: Hindi
- Time zone: UTC+5:30 (IST)

Behadar, also Behadar Kala, is a village and corresponding community development block in Hardoi district of Uttar Pradesh, India. There is a market at Behadar Kalan Hashimpore on Wednesdays and Sundays, with no particular specialisation. The village has 3 primary schools and 0 healthcare facilities. As of 2011, the population of Behadar is 4,458, in 1,194 households.

== Villages ==
Behadar CD block has the following 90 villages:

Village name	Total land area (hectares)	Population (in 2011)
Wehsar	848.2	5,244
Gauri Seyad Talib	255.6	1,696
Sindhwal Malihabad	312.8	2,620
Gauri Dayampur	267.1	2,052
Phatenpur Pathrauly Pachhim	89.7	924
Sukhan Khera	265.1	1,271
Phatehpur Pathrauly Purab	290	1,150
Auramau	162.7	1,664
Hasnapur	148.7	1,945
Rasulpur Grant	422.9	2,493
Phakar Patti	112.4	973
Asahi Ajampur	342.2	2,764
Santokha	119.7	1,110
Gogawan Jot	103.3	1,247
Bhatouly	517.4	4,245
Nandauly	134	666
Sarsand	382.2	3,608
Kutubpur	165.2	1,091
Dhudhera	478.2	3,813
Gondwa Bhup	128.8	1,609
Bakue	109.3	946
Gauri Bidur	94.4	972
Damghara	95.6	504
Pilkhini	334.8	2,705
Khrika	552.1	2,197
Allipur Tandwa	441.1	3,362
Reaso	1,047.8	4,332
Hewaly	138.7	1,058
Hiya	534.2	3,846
Allawalpur	267.8	1,973
Jarha	447.1	3,887
Bagha Danda	236	825
Enayatpur	254.3	1,107
Kherwa	359.1	1,962
Samodha	606	4,174
Usarha	809.7	2,333
Mahsona	280.3	2,305
Behadar Khurd	814.8	5,523
Behadar Kala (block headquarters)	599.6	4,458
Kasimpur	536.5	4,320
Rampur Bhatauly	363.5	1,838
Akohara Newada	228.6	1,329
Ritawey	259.8	1,916
Sarehri	433	3,676
Shahpur	170	1,361
Diwary	332.5	2,762
Dularpur	139.4	1,120
Aant	139.7	501
Chandu	220.4	1,135
Chamrha	62.3	430
Bhiti	190.1	1,130
Birauly	328.3	2,243
Atuka	90.9	1,061
Kanjaura	121	945
Mahmoodpur Lalta	159.7	1,123
Rasulpur Barhman	379.6	1,869
Balnapur	144.2	452
Bahlolpur	596.3	2,930
Sidhikpur	80.1	649
Sirauly	231.7	1,430
Dhanna Rampur	72.2	589
Atiya	225.9	2,092
Bhaghar	95.4	172
Turnadew	108.2	562
Nariyary	79.4	776
Turna Rudra	139.4	1,483
Bindaura	146.6	954
Jahidpur	302.2	2,374
Akbarpur Talhu	220.8	1,747
Baragaon	759.2	5,234
Kundry	284.4	1,445
Husenpur	131.8	1,084
Paliya	76	514
Chanda Baija	518	3,269
Jasu	189	1,248
Pigrawan	137.4	936
Kudauni	153.6	1,322
Dewnathpur	164.9	1,206
Madar	351.3	3,385
Karlawan	280.7	1,877
Kahchari	431.2	2,705
Hardei Salempur	79.6	459
Aladadpur Newada	255	1,761
Gadiyana	95.3	421
Dakhwa	131.6	761
Kajipur	175.9	1,126
Ghuspahan	454.5	1,728
Kakenduwa	129.9	810
Sarwen	626.9	3,424
