= Goswa =

Goswa is a village in Bilgrame tehsil, Hardoi district, Uttar Pradesh state, India.
