= Sandi Bird Sanctuary =

Bird sanctuary in Uttar Pradesh, India

Sandi Bird Sanctuary, Hardoi, Uttar Pradesh
- IUCN category IV (habitat/species management area)
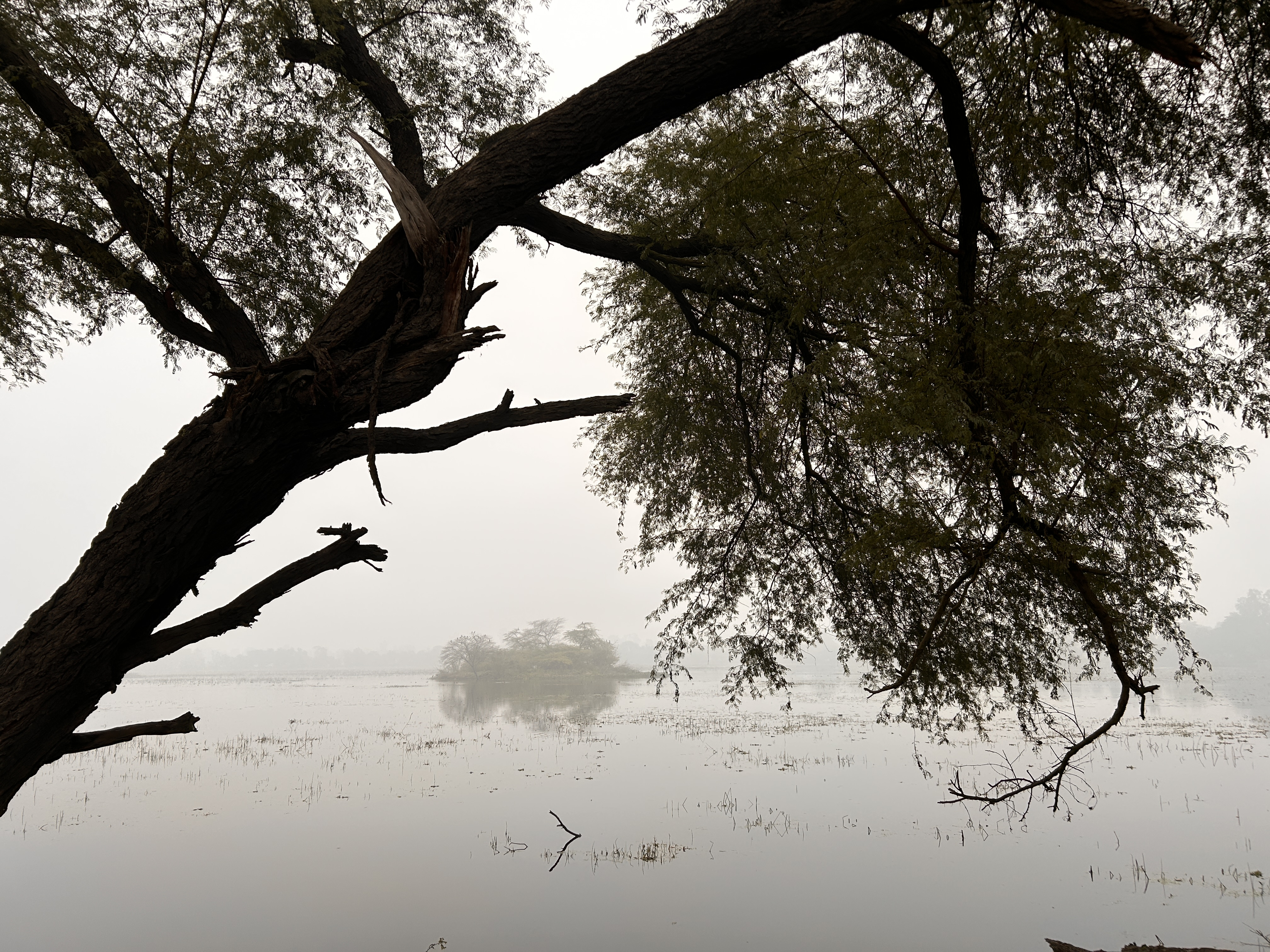
- December 2025 foggy morning in Sandi

- Location within Uttar Pradesh Location within India
- Interactive map of Sandi Bird Sanctuary, Hardoi, Uttar Pradesh
- Location: Sandi, Hardoi, Uttar Pradesh, India
- Nearest city: Hardoi
- Coordinates: 27°15′00″N 79°55′00″E
- Governing body: Uttar Pradesh Government
- Website: http://upforestwildlife.org/sandisanctuary/index.html

Ramsar Wetland
- Official name: Sandi Bird Sanctuary
- Designated: 26 September 2019
- Reference no.: 2409

Sandi Bird Sanctuary is a bird sanctuary in Hardoi district of Uttar Pradesh, India.

The sanctuary is located at a distance of 19 km on Hardoi-Sandi Road in Sandi in Hardoi district of Uttar Pradesh. Sandi Bird Sanctuary is 1 km from Sandi town on Main Road at Nawabganj, near Sandi Police Station of Hardoi district.

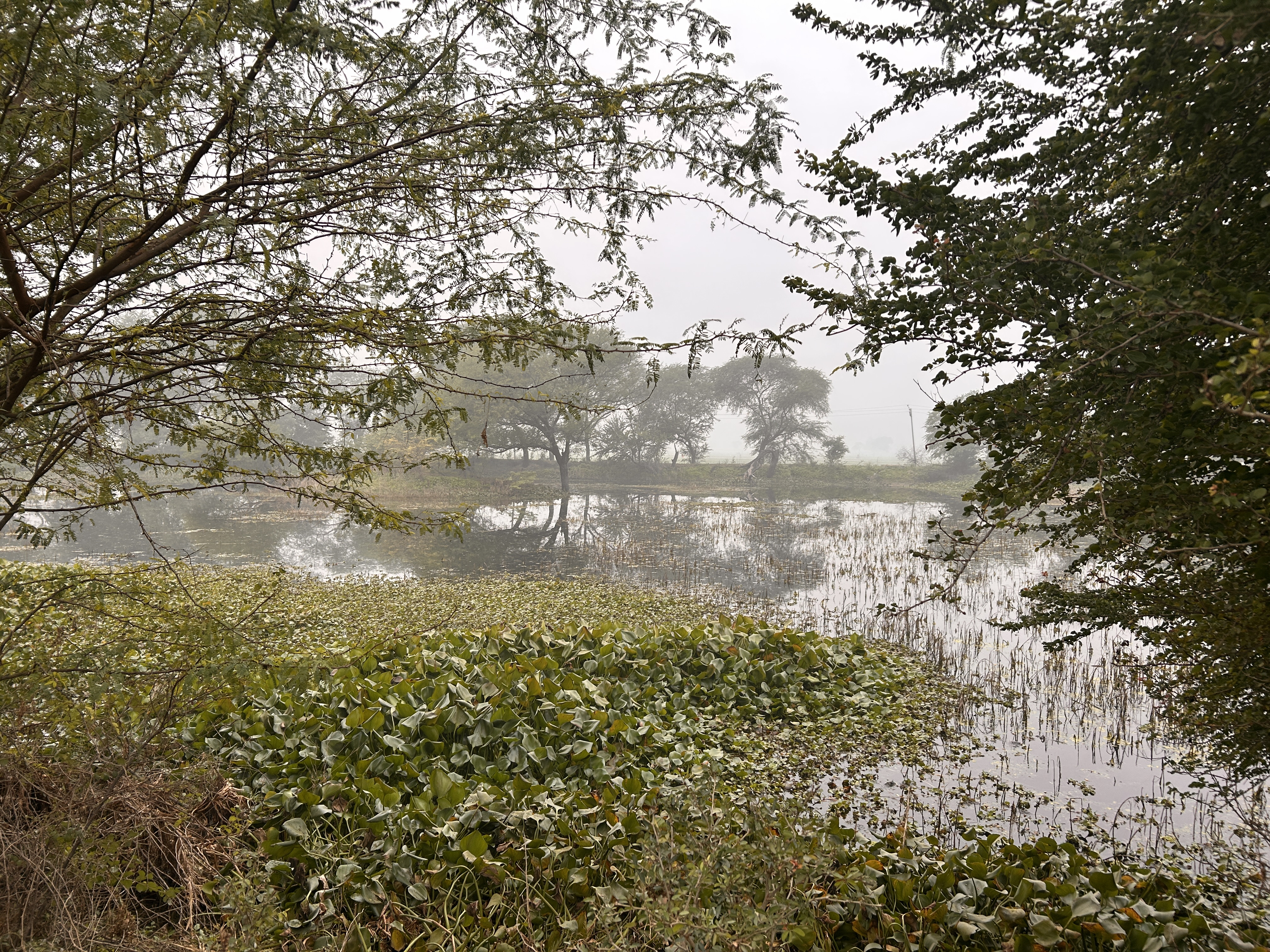
Close up of the wetland on a foggy winter morning of December 2025

Sandi Bird sanctuary was created in the year 1990 in order to protect the natural habitats and aquatic vegetation for the local residents and migratory birds. It has been designated as a protected Ramsar site since September 2019. The Sandi Bird sanctuary is also known by its ancient name as "Dahar Jheel" (Jheel = Lake). The lake's area is 309 ha (3.09 km^{2}). River Garra, formerly known as Garun Ganga, passes near the sanctuary.

Migratory birds rest on the banks of the river before reaching the Sandi Bird sanctuary. The migratory birds begin to arrive at the sanctuary at the beginning of winter in the month of November. Sandi is a tourist As a tourist destination and is of particular interest to birdwatchers. The best time to visit the sanctuary is from December to February. The nearest railway station is at Hardoi (19 km).

In the past, the rare Siberian white crane Grus leucogeranus has been seen here, and some scientists believe it returns under the right circumstances.
