= Ahrori =

Coordinates: 27°20′27″N 80°16′44″E

Ahrori Ahirori
- Populated place
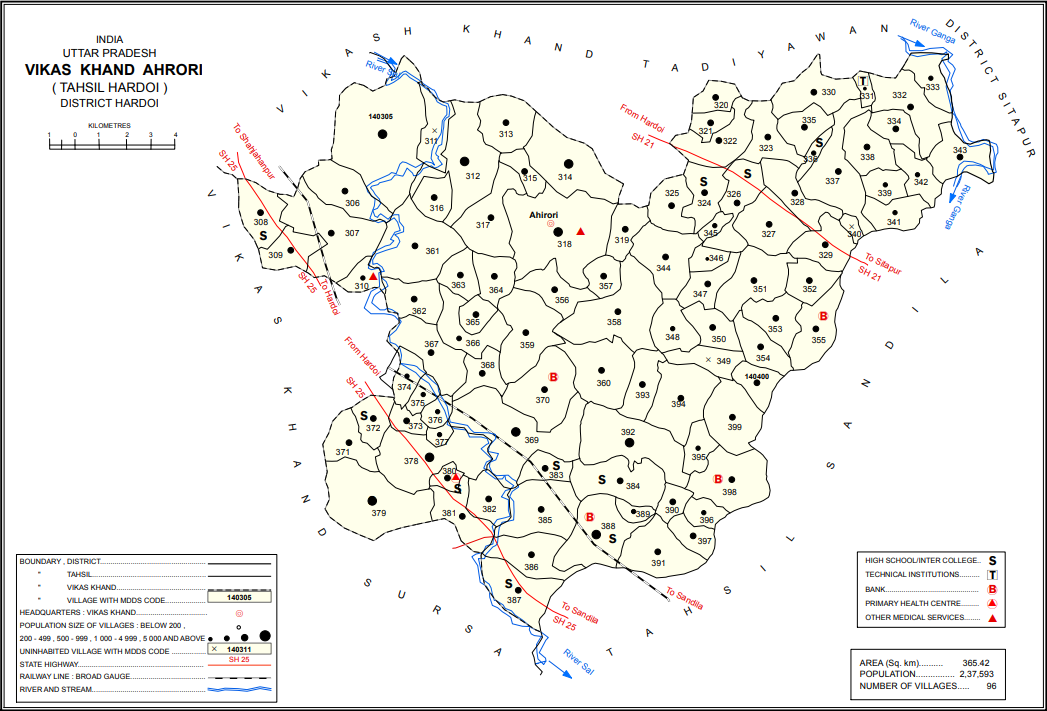
- Map showing Ahrori (#318) in Ahrori CD block

- Location in Uttar Pradesh, India Ahrori (India)
- Country: India
- State: Uttar Pradesh
- District: Hardoi

Area
  - Total: 12.386 km^{2} (4.782 sq mi)

Population (2011)
  - Total: 8,382
  - Density: 676.7/km^{2} (1,753/sq mi)

Languages
  - Official: Hindi
- Time zone: UTC+5:30 (IST)

Ahrori, also spelled Ahirori, is a village and corresponding community development block in Hardoi district of Uttar Pradesh, India. Located 24 km from the city of Hardoi, it hosts a regular market and hosts a Babaji festival on Asadha Sudi 15 dedicated to worship of the goddess Devi. The village has two primary schools and one clinic, as well as a public library and a sub post office. As of 2011, the population of Ahrori is 8,382, in 1,329 households.

== Demographic history ==
The 1961 census recorded Ahrori as comprising 6 hamlets, with a total population of 3,115 (1,763 male and 1,352 female), in 618 households and 531 physical houses. The area of the village was given as 3,062 acres. Average attendance of the Babaji fair was listed as about 500 people at the time.

The 1981 census recorded Ahrori as having a population of 4,517, in 387 households, and covering an area of 1,238.79 hectares.

== Villages ==
Ahrori CD block has the following 96 villages:

Village name	Total land area (hectares)	Population (in 2011)
Neer	1,480.5	7,266
Mahuaipuri	483.4	3,482
Madara	829.8	4,478
Naya Gawn Muvarkpur	328.4	3,194
Khetuai	483.4	4,379
Pihiniya	136	553
Bingfil Ganj	84	0
Atwa Kataiyn	905.3	5,622
Sohasa	448.6	2,177
Kharda Khera	755.7	5,739
Ghoora	141.1	1,073
Bhurdiya	272.3	1,202
Paraspur	559.9	4,544
Ahirori (block headquarters)	1,238.6	8,382
Katka	233.8	1,824
Gopalpur	196.6	1,116
Saripur Bramhnan	117	1,163
Badauli	601.1	2,798
Baksapur	310	2,205
Hunsepur	375.9	2,727
Thok Kaboolpur	267.5	2,029
Dighiya	247.7	1,665
Dahee	568.1	2,771
Kuian	379.7	2,015
Naya Gaon Deoriya	305.8	1,769
Maheen Kund	432.5	1,721
Hasanapur	77.7	443
Karem Nagar Jalalpur	502.6	2,208
Raotapur	292.9	980
Sonoiya	218.2	1,311
Akbarpur	256	1,141
Sadiapur	94.9	821
Ayak Ghara	525.3	2,348
Bane Kuian	311.1	1,999
Chathiya	144	804
Majhola	57.9	0
Dhafrapur	211.1	848
Patteepur	259.9	924
Jamuniya	223.2	1,361
Gonda Rao	542.3	4,853
Mahmoodpur Bahadur	58.8	737
Gohraiya	41.8	441
Bajeedpur	580.2	3,623
Majhigawan Ramgulam	292.8	867
Shekhvapur	42.3	0
Armee	498	1,925
Govardhanpur	563.8	3,404
Kherwa Kamalpur	276.5	1,535
Hans Barauli	324.4	2,142
Sandana	268.4	1,789
Basen	293.9	3,049
Barkherwan	374.8	2,696
Athaua	193.1	1,986
Ahri	823	3,751
Gardeurn	629.2	4,853
Thok Bandho	539	2,669
Mangolapur	772.8	3,647
Bheetha Mahasingh	309.8	1,733
Sahulpur	201.9	2,207
Kot	263.4	1,210
Saareepur Heeralal	132	1,744
Kaimau	370.9	3,217
Behta Murtja Bax	548.6	3,903
Kesvan	260.9	1,760
Karim Nagar Saidapur	877.3	7,463
Kasmandee	590.8	3,833
Punniya	312.8	2,697
Karahi	259.8	1,676
Anua	110.2	1,291
Daudpur	123.3	984
Danmandi	131.1	801
Jarera	46.8	633
Baishpur	58.5	516
Balleepur	760.2	5,161
Fareedapur	731.4	5,461
Bamhna Kherda	110.4	1,685
Khajur Mai	329.3	3,404
Pipona	354.4	2,139
Kamolia	241.9	1,446
Gopar	534.7	3,807
Gadanpur	491.4	3,348
Rao Bahadur	549.3	1,992
Lodhi	441.9	3,746
Baghauli	528.4	8,458
Devgan	86.2	655
Neebhi	132.7	1,038
Gorda Dhar	485.1	2,551
Victoriya Ganj	817.6	7,214
Lokwapur	342.2	1,939
Bhitha Dan	627.3	3,108
Buorapur	172.5	628
Rampur Grant	227.7	912
Jasoo	128.7	1,302
Palpur Baragi Khera	658.9	3,005
Umrapur	491.8	2,147
Atra	227.3	1,780
