= Rajpal Kashyap =

Member of Uttar Pradesh Legislative Council

Uttar Pradesh Legislative Council
- Incumbent
- Assumed office 27 May 2016
- Constituency: Nominated

State President of Backward Cell of Samajwadi Party
- Incumbent
- Assumed office August 2020

President of Lucknow University Students' Union
- In office 2004–2005

Personal details
- Born: 20 December 1976 (age 49)
- Party: Samajwadi Party
- Education: University of Lucknow (Doctor of Philosophy)
- Profession: Agriculturalist

Rajpal Kashyap (born 20 December 1976) is an Indian politician who is serving as a member of Uttar Pradesh Legislative Council since 2016 representing the Samajwadi Party. He was President of Lucknow University Students' Union in year 2003–2004 and President in year 2004–2005. He is State President of Backward Cell of Samajwadi Party.

== Personal life ==
Rajpal Kashyap was born to Siyaram Kashyap and Shreemati Kamla on 20 December 1976 in Hardoi district. He received his M. Phil and PhD degrees from the University of Lucknow. Kashyap is married and is an agriculturalist by profession.

Rajpal Kashyap is a Gold Medalist in Lucknow University for Good Educational character and best behaviour, helpful nature and social work in year 2004–2005.

== Posts held ==
office	Year
Hardoi district General Secretary, Samajwadi Yuvjan Sabha	1995–1996
Vice President of Lucknow University Students' Union	2003–2004
President of Lucknow University Students' Union	2004–2005
National vice president of Samajwadi Chhatra Sabha	2005–2008
National General Secretary Samajwadi Yuvjan Sabha	2008–2011
State President of Samajwadi Chhatra Sabha, Uttar Pradesh	2011–unknown
Member of Uttar Pradesh Legislative Council	2016–Incumbent
Member of National Working Committee of Samajwadi Party	2017–Incumbent
State President of Backward Cell of Samajwadi Party	2020–Incumbent
