= Bharawan =

- Populated place
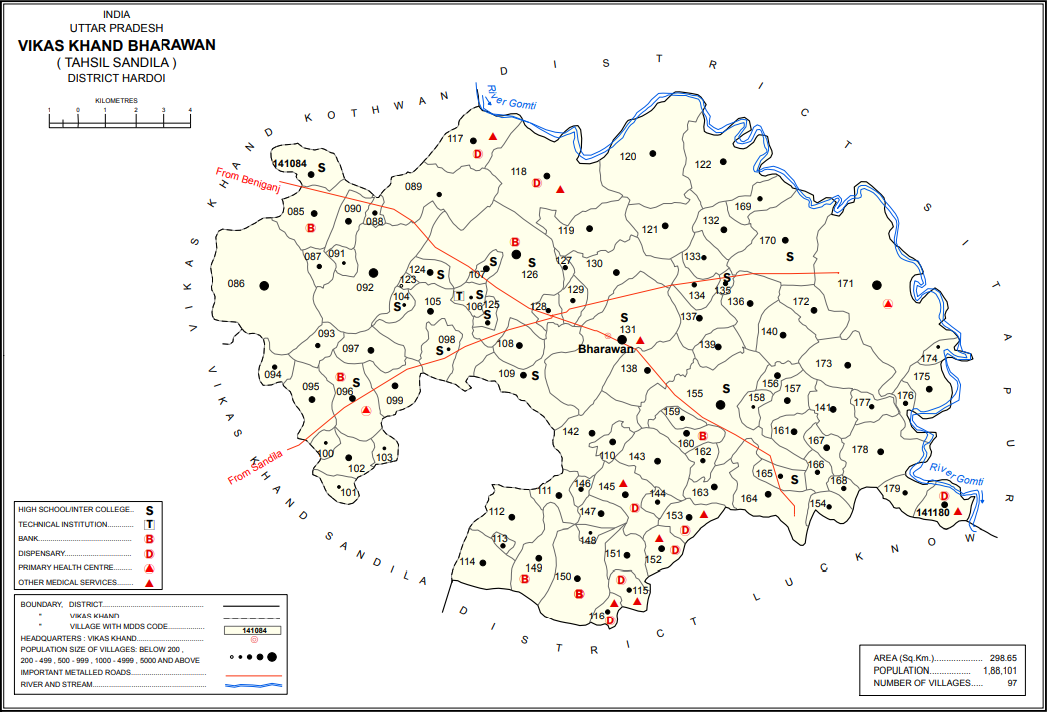
- Map showing Bharawan (#131) in Bharawan CD block

- Location in Uttar Pradesh, India Bharawan (India)
- Coordinates: 27.158277°N 80.706018°E
- Country: India
- State: Uttar Pradesh
- District: Hardoi

Area
  - Total: 10.451 km^{2} (4.035 sq mi)

Population (2011)
  - Total: 10,443
  - Density: 999.23/km^{2} (2,588.0/sq mi)

Languages
  - Official: Hindi
- Time zone: UTC+5:30 (IST)

Bharawan is a village and corresponding community development block in Sandila tehsil of Hardoi district, Uttar Pradesh, India. Located 23 km from Sandila, it hosts a market on Mondays and Thursdays and has four primary schools and one healthcare facility. The main staple foods are wheat and juwar. As of 2011, the population of Bharawan is 10,443, in 1,649 households.

== Demographic history ==
The 1961 census recorded Bharawan as comprising 13 hamlets, with a total population of 4,314 (2,286 male and 2,028 female), in 838 households and 701 physical houses. The area of the village was given as 2,657 acres.

The 1981 census recorded Bharawan as having a population of 6,066, in 1,466 households, and covering an area of 1,074.88 hectares.

== Villages ==
Bharawan CD block has the following 97 villages:

Village name	Total land area (hectares)	Population (in 2011)
Sonikpur	717.2	4,016
Gondwa	664.1	3,515
Bahuty	1,458.7	8,770
Dilawar Nagar	92.7	836
Jalalpur	54	597
Bastapur	189.2	802
Gauny	176.5	2,901
Rani Khera	99.5	361
Baheriya	844	6,428
Lauly	150.3	964
Kuwan Bojh	139.8	694
Sahigawan	284.5	2,601
Dhikuhny	423.6	2,899
Lalamau	583.4	1,577
Jagasara	206.5	1,197
Kanaura Ant	258.3	2,345
Baky Nagar	50.6	252
Madna Khera	99.4	492
Bamhnaua Peng	226.1	1,025
Tidwary	78.8	492
Mohiuddin Pur	79.5	451
Parsa	527.5	3,339
Gaundwa Patti Alampur	68.9	264
Alampur	95.7	1,281
Sagar Garhi	192.5	1,018
Dera Kakemau	508.5	2,834
Bilriya	105.5	1,031
Narohiya	189.5	1,200
Bamhnau Aalm Shah	411	1,924
Tikara Khurd	24	504
Kirla	400.9	1,819
Rekwar Khera	124.2	541
Katiyar	77.2	684
Ram Madarpur	451.7	2,067
Jajupur	1,086.4	4,285
Manghgaon	434.4	4,353
Kourondh	836.7	3,586
Shyam Das Pur	380.8	2,143
Kaudiya	798.5	4,440
Andhpur	29.9	166
Laudhora	120.9	1,016
Gondwa Patti Atrauly	80.2	655
Atrauly	1,223.7	8,116
Jhanjholy	49.8	728
Mahmdapur	101.6	911
Jakhwa	110.8	698
Sikandarpur	507	4,622
Bharawan (block headquarters)	1,045.1	10,443
Dula Nagar	347.6	1,307
Lalpur	171.6	669
Banjara	158.2	945
Gherwa	35	967
Seayapur	299.4	2,675
Bany	234.8	1,771
Khasraul	440.8	3,338
Danda	164.8	1,446
Mahuwa Danda	297	1,935
Bengalpur	226	1,170
Kukura	422.8	3,035
Koyaly	376.2	2,153
Atwa Urf Madho Nagar	73.6	573
Etaunja	309.9	1,820
Shivpury	48.5	552
Paharpur	148.1	1,260
Neoa Khera	52.1	371
Bindraban	318	2,094
Pawaya	549	2,658
Hadha	202.3	1,247
Chatiha	179	1,372
Rampur	196	1,234
Jamunipur	114.3	683
Pipargaon	691	6,287
Hayatganj	166.2	2,141
Majhgawan	207.4	1,554
Aura Patty	25.3	385
Rudauly	67.8	628
Newada Bijay	219.1	2,181
Gonndwa Khem	163.4	1,364
Purwa Atwa	100.8	936
Bakwa	211.8	1,798
Sanda Dakhlor	548.3	3,202
Usrha	98.4	655
Suagada	89.9	746
Hirupur Goteya	129.2	1,130
Mawaiya	72.7	501
Terwa	230	931
Chawan	763.7	4,064
Bhatpur	1,649.6	7,167
Hajipur	234	1,118
Pipri Narayanpur	405.8	1,264
Katky	104.5	205
Katka	283.5	1,272
Bhabhuwa	131.3	688
Mahsuwa	130.6	611
Mahitha	508.9	2,471
Deokally	166.4	644
Auna	239.9	1,000
