= Hariyawan =

Hariyawan Hariāwān
- Populated place
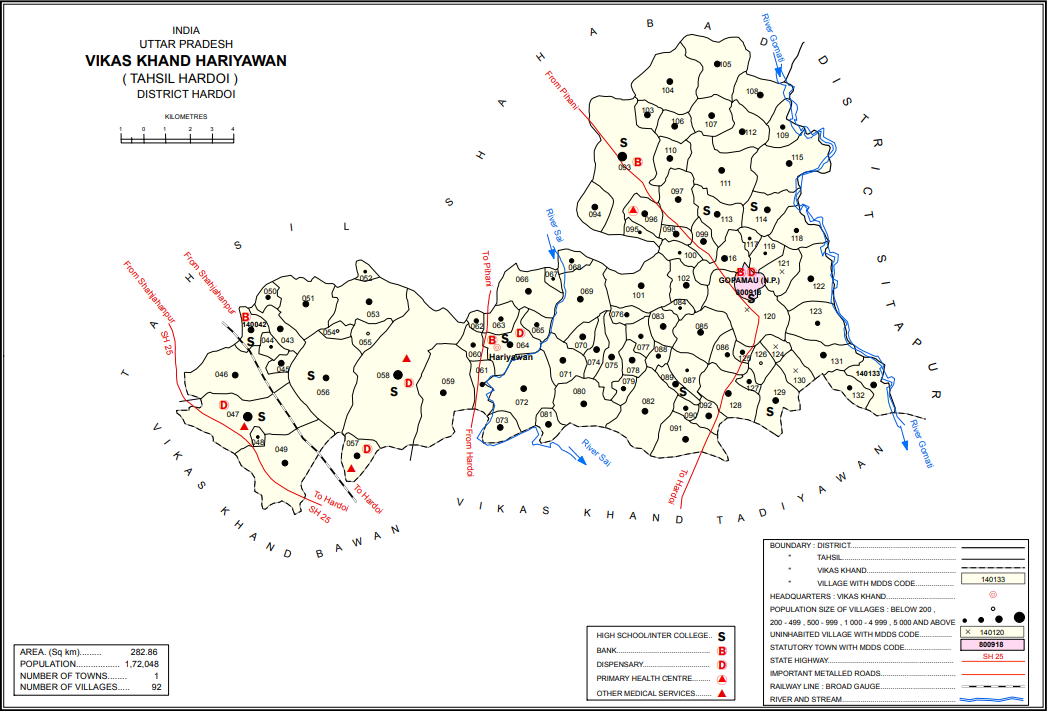
- Map showing Hariyawan (#064) in Hariyawan CD block

- Location in Uttar Pradesh, India Hariyawan (India)
- Coordinates: 27.5286°N 80.1739°E
- Country: India
- State: Uttar Pradesh
- District: Hardoi

Area
  - Total: 3.10 km^{2} (1.20 sq mi)

Population (2011)
  - Total: 2,997
  - Density: 967/km^{2} (2,500/sq mi)

Languages
  - Official: Hindi
- Time zone: UTC+5:30 (IST)

Hariyawan is a village and corresponding community development block in Hardoi district of Uttar Pradesh, India. It hosts a market on Wednesdays and Sundays. The main staple foods here are wheat and rice. As of 2011, its population is 2,997, in 508 households.

== Demographic history ==
The 1961 census recorded Hariyawan as comprising three hamlets, with a total population of 1,573 (832 male and 746 female), in 247 households and 221 physical houses. The area of the village was given as 766 acres.

The 1981 census recorded Hariyawan as having a population of 2,099, in 384 households, and covering an area of 310.00 hectares.

== Villages ==
Hariyawan CD block has the following 92 villages:

Village name	Total land area (hectares)	Population (in 2011)
Kheriya	164.1	1,487
Modipur	242.6	1,228
Atbaha	90.8	241
Rohai	52.9	1,072
Pipari	889.8	4,623
Tolwa Antdanpur	119.8	8,041
Kalwari Grant	48	278
Atwa Asigaon	784.9	4,446
Labhi	94.7	574
Bijgawan	536.3	3,340
Shakurabad	70.2	273
Sadhinava	628.5	3,327
Khajuha	44.2	120
Lodhaura	41.9	123
Mavaiya	957.2	4,985
Seva	260.2	1,374
Kurseli	1,869.3	10,404
Marai	727.7	3,010
Akbarpur	64	726
Jatuli	181	888
Gadaipur	71.1	643
Lohkanpur	216	559
Hariyawan (block headquarters)	310	2,997
Korigawan	130	954
Madrawan	425.7	2,526
Biram Khera	44.7	398
Deoriya Prasidh Nagar	143.1	817
Shahpur Binora	800.1	3,219
Kapurpur Chaudhi	153	1,415
Ahemdi	282	1,166
Utara	638.5	3,572
Kaimpur	195.6	1,258
Hinguapur	132.8	1,203
Murwan	306.5	1,734
Baherda	109.7	637
Jafarpur	126.1	662
Achuapur	118.6	1,111
Majhigawan Amarnath	95.4	564
Bhadeura	566	4,297
Alawalpur	208	1,186
Teni	632.3	3,996
Paidhai	198.7	1,388
Nayagaon Navav	48.9	467
Daulatpur	364.5	2,510
Sarkhna	149.1	926
Mahmudpur Baijnath	165.3	330
Jalalpur	87.1	997
Thamarwa	253.4	1,995
Bigha Rampur	83.9	518
Padri	423.6	3,929
Muradpur	198.8	1,755
Majhiya	977.6	7,060
Lehna	359.6	2,759
Hillapur	190.8	2,843
Bakhariya	190.8	2,843
Tandauna	337.6	2,924
Raniyamau	119.5	1,111
Kathethiya	202.5	1,879
Katarpur	153.5	489
Kathigara	496.5	2,384
Manipur	287.1	1,247
Aliyapur	91.3	1,024
Burdhagaon	599.4	4,368
Dhoviya	509.1	2,365
Barmahaula	163.8	1,533
Dulhapur	248.7	2,183
Khateli	293.4	3,042
Akohara	183.9	867
Purwa Hafijudinpur	208.4	1,583
Jareli	672.2	4,931
Bagocha	338.2	2,291
Kaliyani	253.2	1,791
Bajehra	288.4	2,316
Sirsa	611	2,696
Tandor	290.4	2,962
Aharapur	69.6	317
Sariyan	300.5	814
Barkatpur	226.5	363
Gopamau (Gramin)	864.9	0
Dariyabad	238	0
Rahimpur	400.9	1,948
Kachnari	413.1	722
Bajidnagar	74.8	0
Lalpur	72.7	523
Shahjad Nagar	58.5	179
Fakirabad	185	819
Peng	541	3,835
Agaulapur	329	1,513
Kushalpur	134.8	0
Babupur	330.9	1,117
Gajadharpur	220.2	502
Arwapur	301.2	1,969
