= Som, Uttar Pradesh =

Som
- Village
- Location in Uttar Pradesh, India Som (India)
- Coordinates: 27.06°N 80.52°E
- Country: India
- State: Uttar Pradesh
- District: Hardoi
- Block: Sandila

Area
  - Total: 5.284 km^{2} (2.040 sq mi)

Population (2011)
  - Total: 5,040
  - Density: 954/km^{2} (2,470/sq mi)

Languages
  - Official: Hindi
- Time zone: UTC+5:30 (IST)
- Vehicle registration: UP
- Website: up.gov.in

Som is a village in Sandila block of Hardoi district, Uttar Pradesh, India. It was previously counted as a census town, but the 2011 census reclassified it as a village. It is connected to state highways and has 3 primary schools and 0 healthcare facilities. As of 2011, its population is 5,040, in 1,135 households.
