= Asia Pacific Journal of Human Resources =

- Discipline: Management studies
- Language: English
- Edited by: Timothy Bartram, Malcolm Rimmer

Publication details
- Former name(s): Journal of the Institute of Personnel Management, Personnel Management, Human Resource Management Australia, Asia Pacific Human Resource Management
- History: 1966-present
- Publisher: Wiley-Blackwell on behalf of the Australian Human Resources Institute
- Frequency: Quarterly
- Impact factor: 1.894 (2019)

Standard abbreviations
- ISO 4: Asia Pac. J. Hum. Resour.

Indexing
- ISSN: 1038-4111 (print); 1744-7941 (web)
- LCCN: sn92024094
- OCLC no.: 52029127

Links
- Journal homepage; Online access; Online archive

The Asia Pacific Journal of Human Resources is a quarterly peer-reviewed academic journal that covers research, theoretical and conceptual developments, and examples of current practice in human resources. The journal was established in 1966 and is the official journal of the Australian Human Resources Institute. Until 2011, the journal was published by SAGE Publications. As of 2012, it is published by Wiley-Blackwell on behalf of the Australian Human Resources Institute.

== Abstracting and indexing ==
The Asia Pacific Journal of Human Resources is abstracted and indexed by Scopus and the Social Sciences Citation Index. According to the Journal Citation Reports, the journal has a 2019 impact factor of 1.894, ranking it 15th out of 30 journals in the category "Industrial Relations & Labor" and 152nd out of 226 journals in the category "Management".
