= Sawayajpur tehsil =

Sawayajpur
- Tehsil
- Location in Uttar Pradesh, India
- Coordinates: 27.08°N 80.52°E
- Country: India
- State: Uttar Pradesh
- District: Hardoi
- Elevation: 142 m (466 ft)

Population (2011)
  - Total: 483,668

Languages
  - Official: Hindi
- Time zone: UTC+5:30 (IST)

Sawayajpur tehsil (also spelled Sawaijpur and Sawaizpur) is a tehsil of Hardoi district in the state of Uttar Pradesh, India, which is associated with the Sawayajpur Assembly Constituency of the Uttar Pradesh Legislative Assembly.

== Location and Geography ==
Sawayajpur lies in Hardoi district, approximately 27°05′N 80°31′E, within the fertile Gangetic plains. The area features flat farmland suited for crops like wheat, rice, and sugarcane, with nearby towns including Hardoi and Sandila.

The local post office, PIN 241123, covers 21.22 sq km and supports a population of around 8,221 people.

== Demographics ==
According to the 2011 Census of India, Sawayajpur tehsil had a population of 483,668 people, consisting of 261,963 males and 221,705 females, across 82,147 households. The overall sex ratio was 846 females per 1,000 males. The literacy rate stood at 67.02%, indicating a moderate level of educational attainment in the region. Hindi is the predominant language spoken in the tehsil.

== History and Administration ==
Hardoi district, including Sawaijpur, saw early Islamic influence from expeditions like those of Sayid Salar Masud in 1032 AD and later rulers such as Qutub-ud-din Aibak in 1193 AD. The region passed through Jaunpur kings, Lodis, Mughals like Babur and Humayun, and Sher Shah before stable Awadh Nawabi control.

Today, it falls under official district administration, with sites like the local tehsil office handling revenue and development.

== Modern Significance ==
Sawaijpur remains politically active as an assembly seat and focuses on agriculture, with studies noting farmer profiles across tehsils like Bilgram and Sandila. Infrastructure includes branch post offices tied to Hardoi HPO, aiding daily services.
