= Hazratpur =

Village in Uttar Pradesh, India

- Village
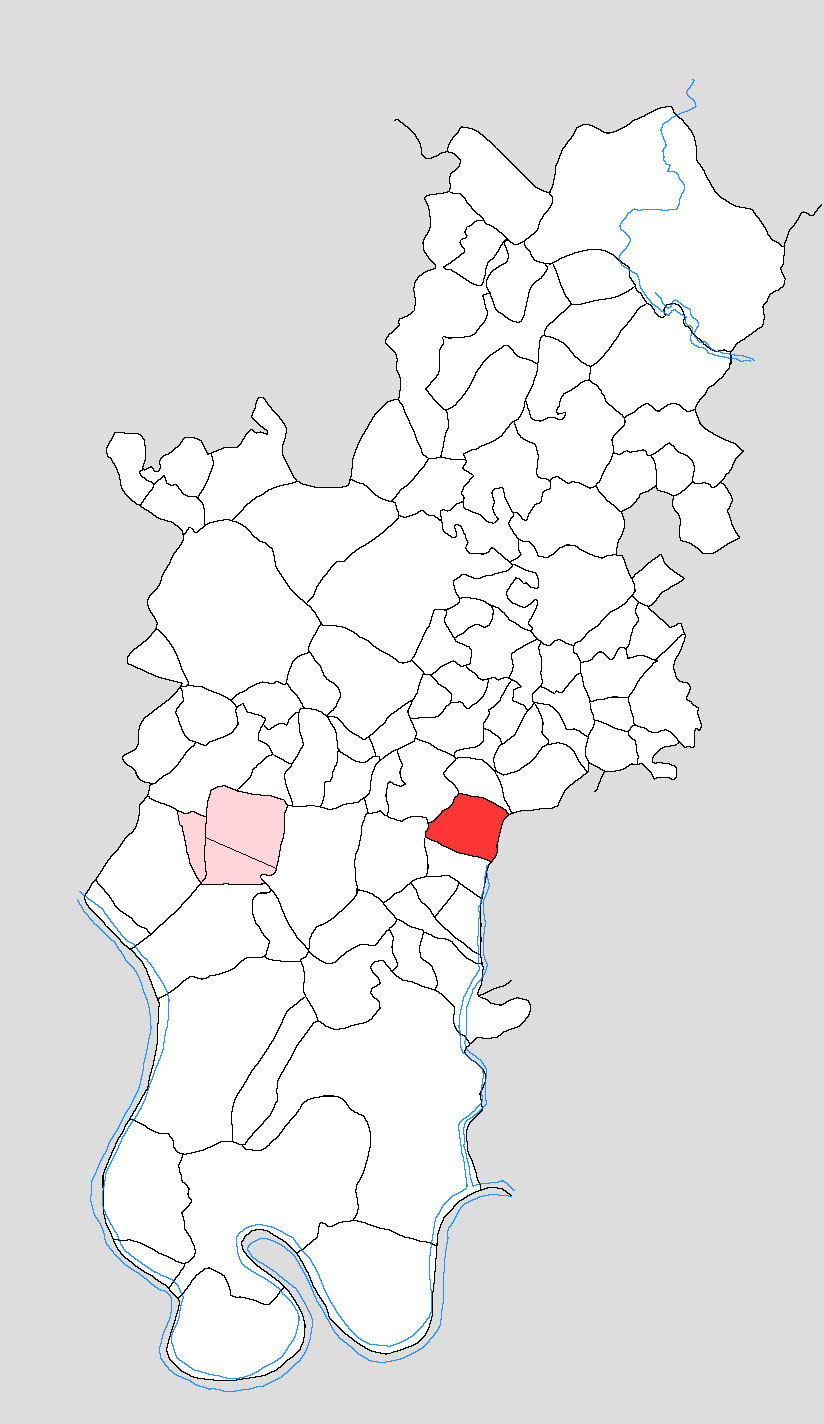
- Map showing Hazratpur in Tundla block

- Location in Uttar Pradesh, India
- Coordinates: 27.21319°N 78.29728°E
- Country: India
- State: Uttar Pradesh
- District: Firozabad
- Tehsil: Tundla

Area
  - Total: 2.346 km^{2} (0.906 sq mi)

Population (2011)
  - Total: 2,715
  - Density: 1,157/km^{2} (2,997/sq mi)
- Time zone: UTC+5:30 (IST)

Hazratpur (Hazratpur) is a village in Tundla block of Firozabad district, Uttar Pradesh. As of 2011, it has a population of 2,715, in 514 households.

== Demographics ==
As of 2011, Hazratpur had a population of 2,715, in 514 households. This population was 52.0% male (1,413) and 48.0% female (1,302). The 0-6 age group numbered 356 (185 male and 171 female), making up 13.1% of the total population. 620 residents were members of Scheduled Castes, or 22.8% of the total.

The 1981 census recorded Hazratpur (as "Hazaratpur") as having a population of 604 people (330 male and 274 female), in 79 households and 79 physical houses.

The 1961 census recorded Hazratpur (as "Hazaratpur") as comprising 1 hamlet, with a total population of 394 people (211 male and 183 female), in 61 households and 40 physical houses. The area of the village was given as 580 acres.

== Infrastructure ==
As of 2011, Hazratpur had 1 primary school; it did not have any healthcare facilities. Drinking water was provided by hand pump and tube well/borehole; there were no public toilets. The village did not have a post office or public library; there was at least some access to electricity for all purposes. Streets were made of both kachcha and pakka materials.
