= Kankar =

Geological term

Kankar or (kunkur) is a sedimentological term derived from Hindi (and ultimately Sanskrit) which is occasionally applied in both India and the United States to detrital or residual rolled, often nodular calcium carbonate formed in soils of semi-arid regions. It is used in the making of lime and of roads. It forms sheets across alluvial plains, and can occur as discontinuous lines of nodular kankar or as indurated layers in stratigraphic profiles. Such are more generally referred to as calcrete, hardpan or duricrust.

== See also ==
- Caliche (mineral)
Recent kankar sheet on Hookina Floodplain, South Australia

Late Pleistocene kankar channel fill and lines in riverbank section of Hookina Floodplain, South Australia
