= Lucknow division =

Administrative division of Uttar Pradesh, India

Coordinates: 26.8500°N 80.9200°E

Lucknow division in Uttar Pradesh

Lucknow division is one of the 18 administrative geographical units (i.e. division) of the northern Indian state of Uttar Pradesh. Lucknow city is the administrative headquarters of the division. The division consists of 6 districts:-

- Lucknow
- Hardoi
- Lakhimpur Kheri
- Raebareli
- Sitapur
- Unnao

== Languages ==
Lucknow division: mother-tongue of population, according to the 2011 Census.
1. Hindi (94.17%)
2. Urdu (4%)
3. Awadhi (0.83%)
4. Others (1%)

Lucknow division: mother-tongue of population, according to the 2011 Census.
Mother tongue code	Mother tongue	Districts						Lucknow division	
Mother tongue code	Mother tongue	Kheri	Sitapur	Hardoi	Unnao	Lucknow	Rae Bareli	Total people	Percentage
001002	Assamese	92	42	9	23	2,975	37	3,178	0.01%
002007	Bengali	7,352	2,987	265	280	13,405	418	24,707	0.10%
006030	Awadhi	6,124	37,297	421	3,575	10,881	137,411	195,709	0.83%
006102	Bhojpuri	54,593	5,884	118	104	5,550	43	66,292	0.28%
006142	Chhattisgarhi	23	31	0	96	873	731	1,754	0.01%
006240	Hindi	3,749,802	4,175,470	3,987,645	3,033,529	4,163,409	3,209,172	22,319,027	94.17%
006340	Kumauni	38	4	0	0	2,066	0	2,108	0.01%
010014	Tharu	1,323	0	0	0	5	0	1,328	0.01%
011016	Malayalam	76	73	7	47	2,360	147	2,710	0.01%
013071	Marathi	62	33	12	14	1,942	105	2,168	0.01%
014011	Nepali	713	46	4	13	3,417	20	4,213	0.02%
015043	Odia	27	7	28	18	1,244	292	1,616	0.01%
016038	Punjabi	73,583	7,380	3,575	384	19,210	1,169	105,301	0.44%
019014	Sindhi	27	183	1	16	5,303	512	6,042	0.03%
020027	Tamil	38	4	10	4	1,239	11	1,306	0.01%
021046	Telugu	19	3	0	0	1,472	24	1,518	0.01%
022015	Urdu	124,737	252,025	100,136	69,806	346,474	54,050	947,228	4.00%
040001	English	64	1,484	86	63	867	148	2,712	0.01%
–	Others	2,550	1,039	528	395	7,146	1,269	12,927	0.05%
Total		4,021,243	4,483,992	4,092,845	3,108,367	4,589,838	3,405,559	23,701,844	100.00%
