= Hardoi district =

Coordinates: 27°25′N 80°15′E

- District of Uttar Pradesh
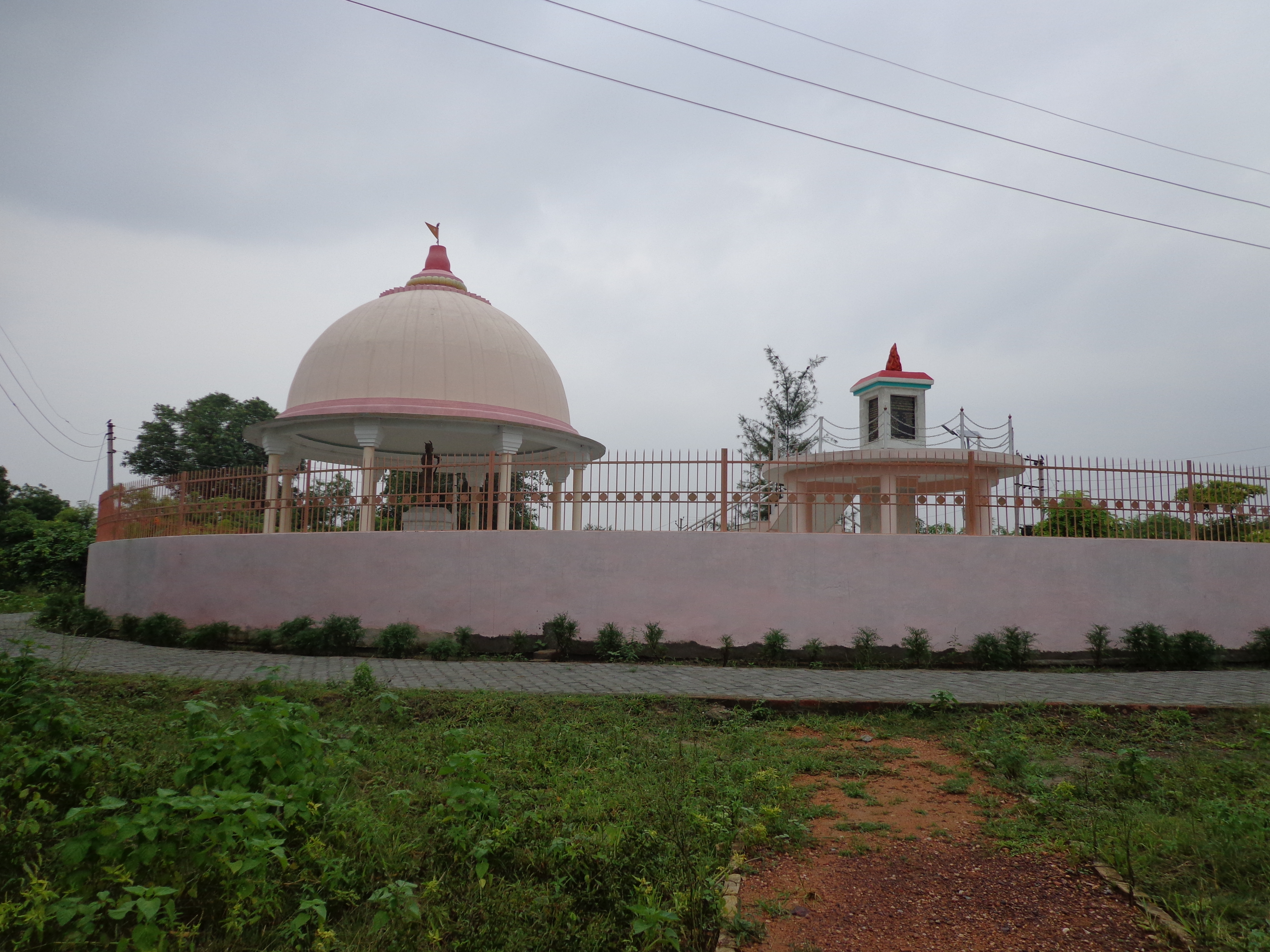
- Monument to Narpati Singh in Hardoi

- Location of Hardoi district in Uttar Pradesh
- Country: India
- State: Uttar Pradesh
- Division: Lucknow
- Headquarters: Hardoi
- Tehsils: Hardoi, Shahabad, Sandila, Bilgram and Sawayajpur.

Government
  - Lok Sabha MP: Jay Prakash Rawat
  - Vidhan Sabha constituencies: 8

Area
  - Total: 5,947 km^{2} (2,296 sq mi)

Population (2011)
  - Total: 4,092,845
  - Density: 688.2/km^{2} (1,782/sq mi)
  - Urban: 541,806

Demographics
  - Literacy: 64.6%
  - Sex ratio: 856
- Time zone: UTC+05:30 (IST)
- Website: hardoi.nic.in

Hardoi district is a district situated in the center of Uttar Pradesh, India. The district headquarters is in the city of Hardoi. Hardoi is the third largest district of Uttar Pradesh. It falls under Lucknow division in the historical region of Awadh State.

As of the 2011 census, the total population of Hardoi district is 4,092,845 people, in 730,442 households. It is the 13th-most populous district in Uttar Pradesh.

== History ==
The present-day Hardoi district was created by the British after their takeover of Awadh in 1856. At the time of Akbar in the 1500s, the area of the modern district was divided between the sarkars of Lucknow and Khairabad. Five mahals were in Lucknow sarkar: Sandila, Mallanwan, Kachhandao, "Garanda" (probably a miscopying of Gundwa), and Bilgram. The Ain-i-Akbari does list a mahal of Hardoi in Lucknow district, but this was referring to the Hardoi in modern Rae Bareli district instead of the one in Hardoi district. As for the sarkar of Khairabad, the mahals of Gopamau, Sara, Bawan, Sandi, Pali, and Barwar-Anjana were either partially or entirely in the territory of modern Hardoi district.

In the following centuries, the administrative setup in the area underwent various changes. The pargana of Balamau was formed out of Sandila around the end of Akbar's reign, and it included an area of 42 villages cleared from the jungle by a Kurmi named Balai. The pargana of Barwan was also established at an early date, being split off from Sandi. Kalyanmal became a separate pargana during the reign of Aurangzeb, when a fort was built there; it had previously been part of Gundwa. Shahabad became a pargana in 1745, almost 70 years after the town itself was established; it was split off from the pargana of Pali. Pachhoha was separated from Pali to become a pargana in about 1840. The pargana of Katiari was formed in the early 1800s by taking some areas belonging to Sandi and some belonging to Pali, and the small pargana of Saromannagar was created in 1803 from parts of Pali and parts of Sara. Mansurnagar was created in 1806 from parts of Sara and Gopamau. Bangar was split off from Bilgram in 1807, when the lowlands (kachh) and uplands (bangar) of Bilgram were separated. Finally, Barwar-Anjana was entirely dismantled in 1703 and replaced with 9 smaller parganas, including Pindwara, Pihani, and Alamnagar.

Under the Nawabs of Awadh, the area of present-day Hardoi district was divided into several different chaklas. Sandila became a chakla in 1821, consisting of the parganas of Sandila, Mallanwan, Kachhandao, and Malihabad (the last of which is now in Lucknow district).

Hardoi district was first formed after the British annexed Awadh in February 1856, and it was originally called Mallanwan district because its headquarters were at Mallanwan. After the 1857 uprising the seat was moved to Hardoi due to its more central location.

At that time, Hardoi district consisted of four tehsils: Shahabad, Hardoi, Bilgram, and Sandila. Shahabad tehsil contained eight parganas: Shahabad, Pali, Pachhoha, Saromannagar, Barwan, Mansurnagar, Alamnagar, and Pindarwa-Pihani. Hardoi tehsil contained the parganas of Bangar, Gopamau, Sara, and Bawan. Bilgram tehsil contained the parganas of Bilgram, Mallanwan, Kachhandao, Sandi, and Katiari; and finally, Sandila tehsil comprised the four parganas of Sandila, Gundwa, Kalyanmal, and Balamau.

In 1869, Sara pargana was divided into Sara North and Sara South, and Sara North was transferred into Shahabad tehsil, while at the same time Barwan was transferred into Hardoi tehsil.

== Geography ==
Hardoi is the westernmost district of Awadh. Its eastern border is formed by the Gomti River, which separates it from Sitapur and Lakhimpur Kheri districts. To the south, it borders Lucknow and Unnao districts. On the west, its border is formed partly by the Sendha river until it joins the Ramganga, and then the district border cuts south to the Ganges, which then forms the western boundary the rest of the way.

There are two main geographic divisions of Hardoi district: the kachh or lowlands in the west and the bangar or uplands in the east. The dividing line between them is a high bank of barren sandhills on the east side of the Garra basin, running north–south in the western part of the district.

In the east, a broad upland belt with sandy soil overlooks the Gomti. Between them and the river, there is a small area of tarai lowlands with mostly poor sandy soil, some of which is covered by swamps. The uplands are characterised by rolling sandhills, which are often covered with tufts of munj grass several meters tall. These hills are otherwise dry and barren, and they present a constant hazard to the farms below them because they are liable to shift during high winds. They are most prominent in the area around Gopamau. The sandy ridges are broken up by steep ravines, which drain the water that collects in lower-lying areas to the west. In some of those depressions, there are large reedy swamps.

Further west is the Sai valley, which consists of alternating patches of loamy and clayey soil. There are many depressions and jhils, stretches of barren usar land, and, historically, scattered patches of dhak jungle. Especially in the north, the banks of the Sai were in many places heavily forested. Further south, both banks of the Sai are high and sandy, although here it is much more fertile than along the Gomti. Between them and the river itself, there are narrow strips of tarai lowlands, vulnerable to flooding.

The western border of the bangar uplands is formed by another high bank of barren sandhills, which mark the eastern part of the Garra basin and may have once done the same for the Ganges. This bank is narrow, scoured by many ravines, and slopes steeply down to the kachh lowlands on the west. These lowlands are traversed by many rivers and streams, and they are prone to flooding and often covered by marshes. Continuing westward, the final river that crosses the kachh is the mighty Ganges, whose course often shifts around in its extremely wide bed. The annual floods cover this entire lowlying area, depositing a sandy soil which is less conducive to agriculture than the more loamy deposits of the Garra and Ramganga.

Hardoi district was once heavily wooded, especially in the upland areas, but by the turn of the 20th century much of this had been cleared, mostly since the 1870s. The remaining jungle at that time was described as mostly dhak, karaunda, and scrub, with other trees such as the bargad, pipal, pakar, shisham, and neem being much less common and "mere relics of the old jungles."

=== Geology ===
The geology of Hardoi district is fairly unremarkable, with most of the district being covered in Gangetic alluvium like the rest of the Awadh region. In the eastern parts of the district, the surface soil is a reddish clay with an average depth of about 8 feet. Below that is black clay, which is 2 to 10 feet deep. Below that is sandy soil, either grey, white, or yellow and unmixed with clay. In the Sai basin, the sandy layer is closer to the surface; above it is sandy clay, and at the top is a thin layer of yellow clay. For three miles on either side of the Sai, the surface is pure sand. Around the jhils near Pipri, the bottom sandy layer gives way to a bluish, sandy clay, possibly marking an ancient river channel.

=== Wildlife ===
The blackbuck is a common site all throughout the district, especially in the area around Gopamau and along the sandy banks of the Gomti. wolves are also sometimes seen in the ravines along the Gomti and other rivers in the district, but not in especially large numbers. Nilgais are most common in the tamarisk jungles around Dharampur between the Ganga and Ramganga, but they are also found in the larger dhak jungles to the east and northeast. Rarely, leopards are seen in the jungles north of Pihani. The chital, or spotted deer, was once fairly common in the area, but by the early 20th century it had "practically disappeared". The four-horned antelope was also formerly native to the area, but the last one known was shot by hunters in 1865. Jackals and hares are very common.

Common birds in the district include the grey partridge and quail. The black partridge is also found in the grass jungles along the Gomti, as well as a few other scattered areas. During colder months, snipe are also a common sight. Geese and ducks inhabit the district's various jhils.

Sandi Bird Sanctuary is a freshwater marsh and wildlife sanctuary located in Hardoi district, 19 km from the city of Hardoi. It is typical of wetlands in the Indo-Gangetic plains and receives most of its water from monsoon rains. Rich in aquatic plant life and home to a large population of waterfowl, the sanctuary is managed jointly by the Office of the Conservator of Forests and local forest and wildlife officials. It is a popular recreation spot and tourist destination. The sanctuary is vulnerable to drought; in 2014 and 2015 it was dry, and the local bird population declined precipitously. It was designated as a Ramsar site on 26 September 2019.

== Demographics ==
Historical population
Year	Pop.	±% p.a.
1901	1,092,236	—
1911	1,120,542	+0.26%
1921	1,083,727	−0.33%
1931	1,126,750	+0.39%
1941	1,239,083	+0.95%
1951	1,361,562	+0.95%
1961	1,573,171	+1.46%
1971	1,849,519	+1.63%
1981	2,274,929	+2.09%
1991	2,747,082	+1.90%
2001	3,398,306	+2.15%
2011	4,092,845	+1.88%

According to the 2011 census Hardoi district has a population of 4,092,845. This gives it a ranking of 51st in India (out of a total of 640). The district has a population density of 683 inhabitants per square kilometre (1,770/sq mi) . Its population growth rate over the decade 2001-2011 was 20.39%. Hardoi has a sex ratio of 868 females for every 1000 males (the 62nd-highest ratio in Uttar Pradesh) and a literacy rate of 64.6% (51st in the state). 13.24% of the population lives in urban areas. Scheduled Castes made up 31.14% of the population. Additionally, 15.9% of the district's population is in the 0-6 age group as of 2011.

In 1901, the population of Hardoi district was 1,092,834 and Hardoi had 12,174 inhabitants. By the time, the main city was Shahabad with 20,036 inhabitants, Mallanwan 11,158.

Languages of Hardoi district (2011)
1. Hindi (97.4%)
2. Urdu (2.45%)
3. Others (0.12%)

The predominant language spoken in Hardoi district is the Kannauji dialect of Hindi. This sets it apart from the other districts in Awadh, where the Awadhi dialect is spoken. However, in the eastern parts of Hardoi district, the form of Kannauji spoken is very close to the form of Awadhi spoken in neighbouring Unnao and Sitapur districts.

At the time of the 2011 Census of India, 97.43% of the population in the district spoke Hindi (or a related language) and 2.45% Urdu as their first language.

=== Religion ===
Religions in Hardoi district (2011)
Religion	Percent
Hinduism	85.71%
Islam	13.59%
Other or not stated	0.70%
Distribution of religions

The majority of Hardoi district's population are Hindus. The proportion of Hindus in the district is high for Awadh, but lower than some districts such as Unnao, Raebareli, and Pratapgarh. Most Hindus in Hardoi district do not belong to any particular sect, which have relatively few followers compared to other districts. Muslims are most numerous in the district's old historic towns, although they are still usually in the minority there. Shahabad and Sandila are home to high proportions of Muslims, while in Hardoi itself the proportion is lower. Over 90% of the district's Muslims practice Sunni Islam; the proportion that practices Shia Islam is somewhat higher than average for the region, but not especially so.

== Divisions ==
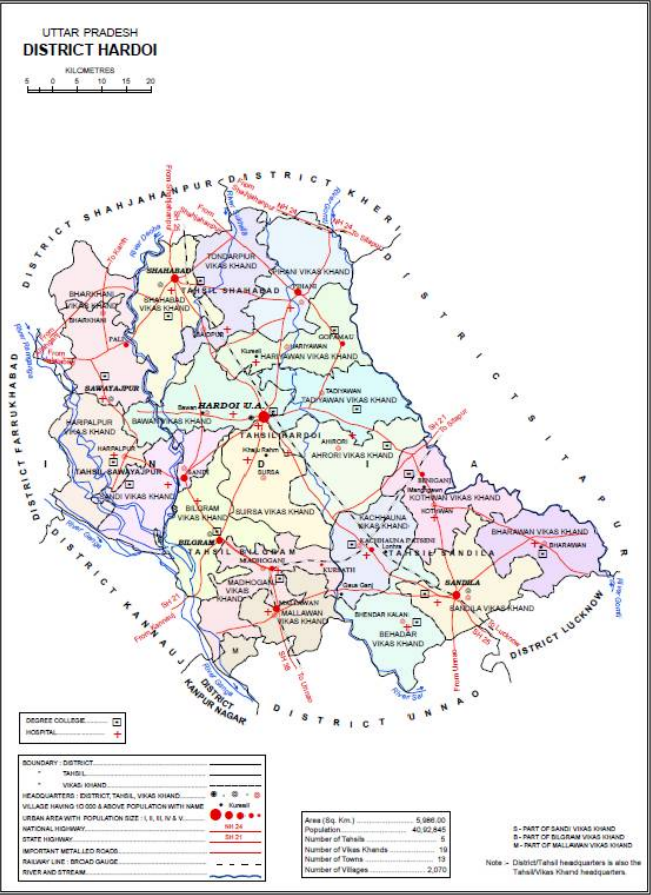
Map of Hardoi district's tehsils and blocks

Hardoi district is divided into five tehsils - Hardoi, Shahabad, Sawayajpur, Bilgram, and Sandila. These tehsils consist of 19 blocks (Ahrori, Hariyawan, Sursa, Shahabad, Bharkhani, Bharawan, Harpalpur, Bilgram, Madhoganj, Mallawan, Tadiyawan, Tondarpur, Kothwan, Sandila, Behadar, Pihani, Sandi, Kachhauna, Bawan). The district has 1,101 gram panchayats and 2,070 revenue villages (1,907 of them are inhabited and 163 are uninhabited). There are also 191 Nyaya panchayats.

The district has 13 towns, including 7 Nagar Palika Parishads (municipal boards) and 6 Nagar Panchayats. There was previously also the census town of Som, but it was reclassified as a village for the 2011 census. The current towns in the district are listed below:

Town name	Classification	Tehsil	Population (in 2011)
Shahabad	Nagar Palika Parishad	Shahabad	80,226
Pihani	Nagar Palika Parishad	Shahabad	36,014
Pali	Nagar Panchayat	Sawayajpur	18,708
Gopamau	Nagar Panchayat	Hardoi	15,526
Hardoi	Nagar Palika Parishad	Hardoi	197,029
Sandi	Nagar Palika Parishad	Bilgram	26,007
Bilgram	Nagar Palika Parishad	Bilgram	29,768
Madhoganj	Nagar Panchayat	Bilgram	11,523
Mallawan	Nagar Palika Parishad	Bilgram	36,915
Kursath	Nagar Panchayat	Bilgram	5,924
Kachhauna Patseni	Nagar Panchayat	Sandila	15,647
Beniganj	Nagar Panchayat	Sandila	10,173
Sandila	Nagar Palika Parishad	Sandila	58,346

This district is a district of the Lucknow Commissionary in Uttar Pradesh Province of India, it is situated in between 26-53 to 27-46 north latitude and 79-41 to 80-46 east longitude. Its north border touches Shahjahanpur district and Lakhimpur Kheri district. Lucknow (capital of U.P.) and Unnao are situated at the southern border. The western border touches Kanpur (industrial city of U.P.) and Farrukhabad district and on the eastern border the Gomati River separates the district from the Sitapur district. 'Nemisharayan, the Pilgrim of Dvapara Yuga (3rd age)' is just 45 km from district headquarters. The length of this district from northwest to southeast is 125.529 km and width from east to west is 74.83 km., the area 5947 km^{2}.

== Police ==
Currently, Ashok Kumar Meena is the superintendent of police of the district. The district is divided into 6 circles headed by the Circle Officer (CO), and 26 police stations, including one mahila thana in the district headed by the station house officer (SHO) of Uttar Pradesh Police.

== Economy ==
In 2006 the Ministry of Panchayati Raj named Hardoi one of the country's 250 most backward districts (out of a total of 640). It is one of the 34 districts in Awadh, Uttar Pradesh currently receiving funds from the Backward Regions Grant Fund Programme (BRGF).

== Places of interest ==
Historical places in the district include:

- Bawan-Puri
- Prahlad Ghat
- Sandi Bird Sanctuary
- Tomb of Nawab Diler Khan, Shahabad

== Notable people ==
Notable people from the district include:

- Brajesh Pathak – Cabinet Minister in Government of Uttar Pradesh.
- Nitin Agrawal – Cabinet Minister in Government of Uttar Pradesh.
- Babu Mohan Lal Verma – local leader of the Indian independence movement from 1932, and member of the national legislative assembly (Vidhan Sabha) 1956-1967
- Rajpal Kashyap – Member of Uttar Pradesh Legislative Council
- Muhammad Sajid Qasmi – Indian Islamic scholar, writer, translator, and professor at Darul Uloom Deoband.
