= Hardoi =

City in Uttar Pradesh, India

- City
- Location in Uttar Pradesh, India Hardoi (India)
- Coordinates: 27.42°N 80.12°E
- Country: India
- State: Uttar Pradesh
- Division: Lucknow
- District: Hardoi

Government
  - Type: Municipal Council
  - Body: Hardoi Municipal Council
  - Municipal Chairperson: Sukhsagar Mishra (BJP)
  - Lok Sabha MP: Jai Prakash (BJP)
  - MLA: Nitin Agrawal (BJP)
- Elevation: 140 m (460 ft)

Population (2011)
  - Total: 126,851

Language
  - Official: Hindi
  - Additional official: Urdu
- Time zone: UTC+5:30 (IST)
- PIN: 241001
- Vehicle registration: UP-30
- Sex ratio: 868 ♀/1000 ♂
- Languages: Hindi, Urdu, Awadhi
- Website: www.hardoi.nic.in

Hardoi is a city and municipal board in Hardoi district in the Indian state of Uttar Pradesh. It is the administrative headquarters of Hardoi district. It is also known as Prahalad Nagari. Hardoi is about 110 km from the state capital Lucknow and about 385 km from New Delhi.

== History ==
According to traditional accounts, the name Hardoi is believed to be a distorted version of the erm Hari-Drohi (Hindi: "Against God"), which in turn is related to Hiranyakashipu, a daitya king and key character in the backstory of the festival of Holi. There is an area in Hardoi that locals claim was the site of Holika's pyre in which she sat with Prahlad who was Hirnakashyap's son.

There are other versions as well. The city derives its name from Raja Hardeo, Bhar chief who built it, but tradition either attributes it to a Thathera ruler named Raja Harnakas or to a religious devotee named Hardeo Babar who supposedly lived here around 1000 CE. In any case, the site was inhabited from an early date; below the old town is an ancient khera that covers 16 acres. Around 1300, a group of Chamar Gaurs led by Nir Singh are said to have conquered the place from the Thatheras, destroyed their fortress, and re-founded the city.

At the turn of the 20th century, Hardoi consisted of two distinct parts: "old" Hardoi, occupying the original site of the village, and "new" Hardoi, which was developed after the establishment of the British civil station in the late 1850s. "New" Hardoi had wide streets, well-shaded by trees, and consisted mostly of the homes of civil officials and members of the local bar, as well as shops. Victoria Hall, built in 1888, contained the municipal and district offices as well as a public library (with books in English, Urdu, Hindi, Persian, Arabic, and Sanskrit) and a clock tower. The city also had a courthouse, police station, dispensary, orphanage, several schools, post and telegraph offices, and jail. Hardoi was not at the time a major commercial centre; the main trade involved gathering grain from the rural parts of the district and then exporting it by rail. There was a grain market at Railwayganj, by the train station, while the main market was at Hardeoganj, which held bazaars on Sundays and Wednesdays. The Gibsonganj quarter, near Railwayganj, had a colony of carpenters who did "extensive business in plough handles, cart wheels, and other portions of country carts."

== Geography ==
Hardoi is located at 27.42°N 80.12°E. It has an average elevation of 134 metres (440 ft). Hardoi is located about 110 km from Lucknow (capital of Uttar Pradesh) and 394 from New Delhi (capital of India).

=== Climate ===
Climate data for Hardoi (1991–2020, extremes 1950–2020)
Month	Jan	Feb	Mar	Apr	May	Jun	Jul	Aug	Sep	Oct	Nov	Dec	Year
Record high °C (°F)	28.9 (84.0)	34.0 (93.2)	40.6 (105.1)	44.4 (111.9)	47.0 (116.6)	48.3 (118.9)	42.5 (108.5)	39.6 (103.3)	39.5 (103.1)	38.2 (100.8)	34.5 (94.1)	31.8 (89.2)	48.3 (118.9)
Mean daily maximum °C (°F)	19.6 (67.3)	24.4 (75.9)	30.3 (86.5)	36.9 (98.4)	39.0 (102.2)	37.8 (100.0)	33.5 (92.3)	32.7 (90.9)	32.5 (90.5)	32.2 (90.0)	28.3 (82.9)	22.3 (72.1)	30.8 (87.4)
Mean daily minimum °C (°F)	9.0 (48.2)	12.2 (54.0)	16.5 (61.7)	22.2 (72.0)	26.0 (78.8)	27.6 (81.7)	26.8 (80.2)	26.4 (79.5)	25.0 (77.0)	20.7 (69.3)	15.0 (59.0)	10.4 (50.7)	19.9 (67.8)
Record low °C (°F)	0.7 (33.3)	2.2 (36.0)	4.2 (39.6)	12.0 (53.6)	14.5 (58.1)	18.5 (65.3)	19.5 (67.1)	16.0 (60.8)	18.0 (64.4)	11.1 (52.0)	6.1 (43.0)	1.7 (35.1)	0.7 (33.3)
Average rainfall mm (inches)	17.2 (0.68)	18.4 (0.72)	11.6 (0.46)	11.8 (0.46)	22.3 (0.88)	92.3 (3.63)	254.2 (10.01)	223.5 (8.80)	163.2 (6.43)	23.1 (0.91)	3.1 (0.12)	7.5 (0.30)	848.2 (33.39)
Average rainy days	1.4	1.5	1.1	0.9	2.0	4.6	10.4	10.6	6.7	1.1	0.4	0.6	41.2
Average relative humidity (%) (at 17:30 IST)	67	56	42	30	34	48	72	75	72	60	59	66	57
Source: India Meteorological Department

== Demographics ==
Religions in Hardoi City (2011)
Religion	Percent
Hinduism	83.13%
Islam	16.06%
Other or not stated	0.81%
Distribution of religions

As of 2011 Indian Census, Hardoi had a total population of 126,851, of which 66,352 were males and 60,499 were females. Population within the age group of 0 to 6 years was 14,048. Hardoi had an average literary rate of 76%, of which male literacy was 79.5% and female literacy was 72.1%. The Scheduled Castes and Scheduled Tribes population was 12,277 and 4 respectively. Hardoi had 21949 households in 2011.

== Tourist attractions ==
- Sandi Bird Sanctuary, created in 1990, previously, "Dahar Jheel", is an important ecotourism bird habitat.

== Economy ==
As of 1971, the economy of Hardoi was described as a hybrid between the service, commercial, and industrial sectors. The main items imported were kerosene oil, cane sugar, and cloth. The main items manufactured were sugar, groundnut oil, and lime. The biggest exports were sugar, groundnut oil, and arhar.

Hardoi has officially been incorporated into the State Capital Region of the Uttar Pradesh government in 2024.

== Education ==
- Seth M.R. Jaipuria School, Hardoi
- St.James School, Hardoi
