= Gaju =

- Populated place
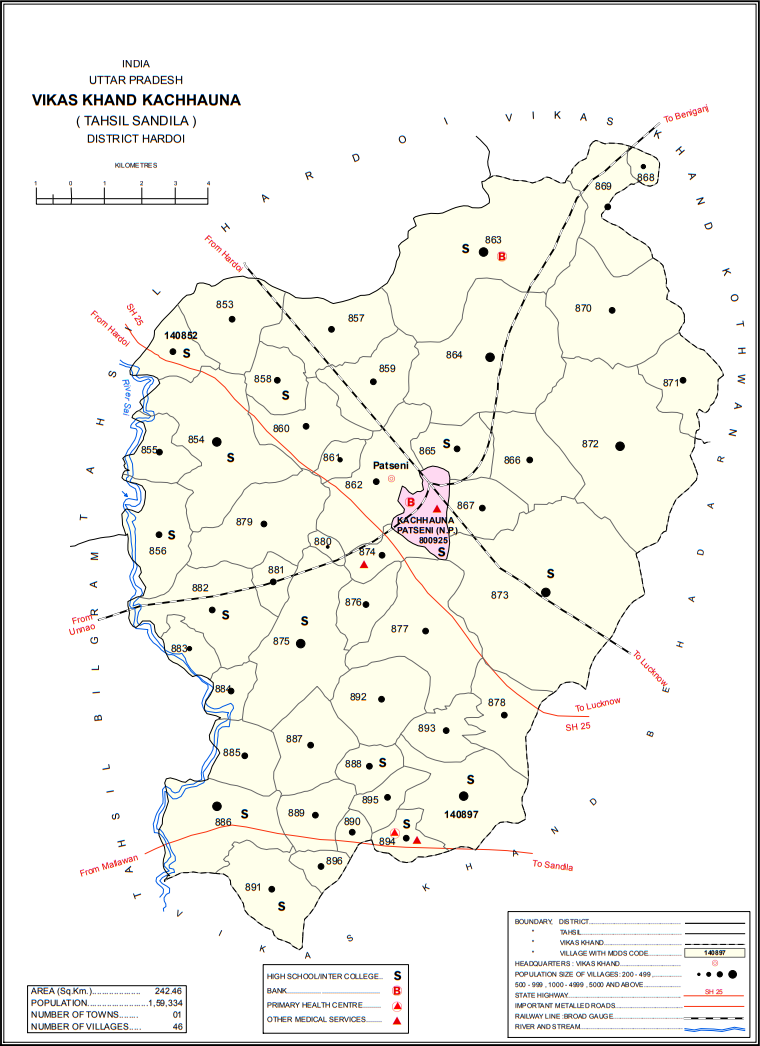
- Map showing Gaju (#864) in Kachhauna CD block

- Location in Uttar Pradesh, India Gaju (India)
- Coordinates: 27°12′N 80°23′E
- Country: India
- State: Uttar Pradesh
- District: Hardoi

Area
  - Total: 12.994 km^{2} (5.017 sq mi)

Population (2011)
  - Total: 8,912
  - Density: 685.9/km^{2} (1,776/sq mi)

Languages
  - Official: Hindi
- Time zone: UTC+5:30 (IST)

Gaju is a village in Kachhauna block of Hardoi district, Uttar Pradesh, India. Located on the road from Balamau station to Beniganj and Sitapur, Gaju has a railway station (Gaju Halt) on the Sitapur-Balamau branch line and hosts a market on Mondays and Thursdays. As of 2011, its population is 8,912, in 1,592 households.

== History ==
At the turn of the 20th century, Gaju was described as a mostly unremarkable agricultural village, with good soil and a small village school. It lay in the pargana of Sandila and was held in taluqdari tenure by Maharaj Singh of Atwa Nasirpur, who resided in the neighbouring village of Hathaura. British authors at the time considered it only noteworthy for its large size: the 1901 census recorded its population as being 2,510 people.

The 1961 census recorded Gaju as comprising 10 hamlets, with a total population of 3,846 (2,050 male and 1,796 female), in 768 households and 592 physical houses. The area of the village was given as 3,347 acres. Average attendance of the biweekly market was about 100.
