= Kalyanmal =

Kalyanmal Kalyānmal Rathauli
- Populated place
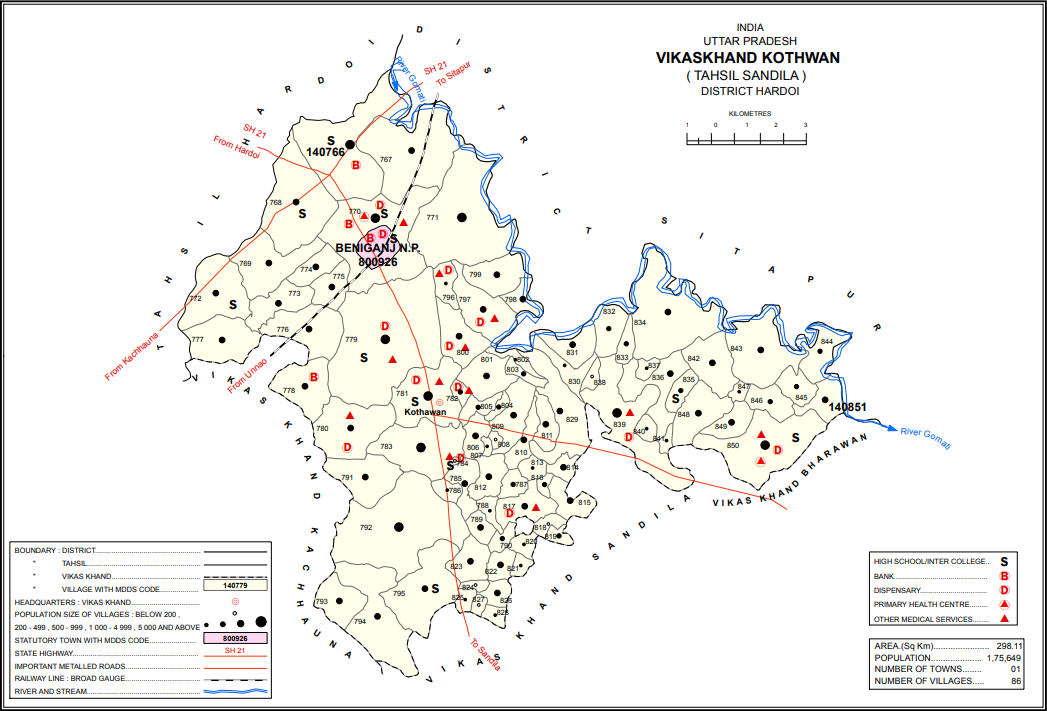
- Map showing Kalyanmal (#839) in Kothwan CD block

- Location in Uttar Pradesh, India Kalyanmal (India)
- Coordinates: 27.235382°N 80.534914°E
- Country: India
- State: Uttar Pradesh
- District: Hardoi

Area
  - Total: 11.642 km^{2} (4.495 sq mi)

Population (2011)
  - Total: 8,295
  - Density: 712.5/km^{2} (1,845/sq mi)

Languages
  - Official: Hindi
- Time zone: UTC+5:30 (IST)

Kalyanmal is a village in Kothwan block of Hardoi district, Uttar Pradesh, India. Historically, the seat of a pargana, Kalyanmal is located 11 km from the city of Beniganj, on the north side of the road leading to Atrauli and Bhatpurwaghat. Also close by is the road running from Sandila to Gundlamau in Sitapur district. Every Sunday during the month of Bhadon, a fair is held at Hattia Haran, a tank south of Kalyanmal where the god Rama is said to have bathed. Kalyanmal also hosts a small fair to Panchabgir Mahadeo during the month of Aghan. As of 2011, the population of Kalyanmal is 8,295, in 1,532 households.

== History ==
According to legend, Kalyanmal was originally called Rathauli because Ramachandra's chariot had stopped here on the way back from Sri Lanka. A mile to the south of Kalyanmal is a pool called Hattia Haran, which is where Ramachandra is said to have bathed. Another tradition associated with Kalyanmal is found at the temple to Panchabgir Mahadeo. Although the structure itself is modern, the lingam is much older and was supposedly set up by Judhisthir, the raja of Hastinapura.

Apart from these legends, the earliest record of Kalyanmal's history is the traditional account of its conquest by the Bais raja Kumar sometime before 1400. Kumar drove out the previous Thathera rulers and built a fort at Rathauli, which became his capital. The ruins of this fort still exist and are now called Wairi Dih. However, the Sikarwar raja Nag Mal later murdered Kumar and seized his lands. The modern town of Kalyanmal was supposedly then founded by Nag Mal's grandson, Kalyan Sah.

Kalyanmal became the seat of a pargana during the reign of Aurangzeb. A fort was built here at that time, and a garrison was posted along with one cannon.

In 1901, the population of Kalyanmal was 1,783, with almost all the locals belonging to the Chamar community. There was a village school at the time, and the average attendance at the Hattia Haran fair was about 5,000 people.

The 1961 census recorded Kalyanmal as comprising 17 hamlets, with a total population of 3,393 people (1,805 male and 1,588 female) in 618 households and 498 physical houses. The village area was given as 2,938 acres.

The 1981 census recorded Kalyanmal as having a population of 5,075, in 1,092 households, and covering an area of 1,190.63 hectares.
