= Bilgram =

- Town
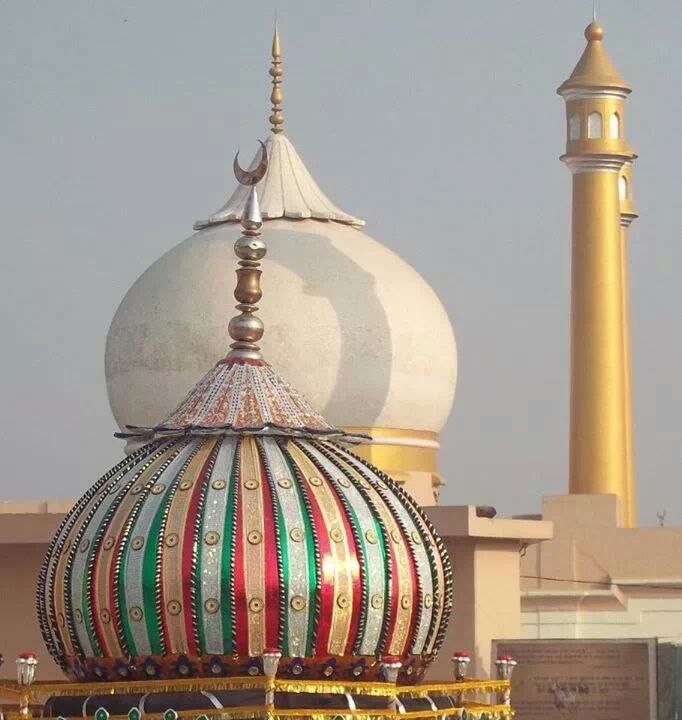
- View of the Bada Tazia and the dargah/ home of bilgram

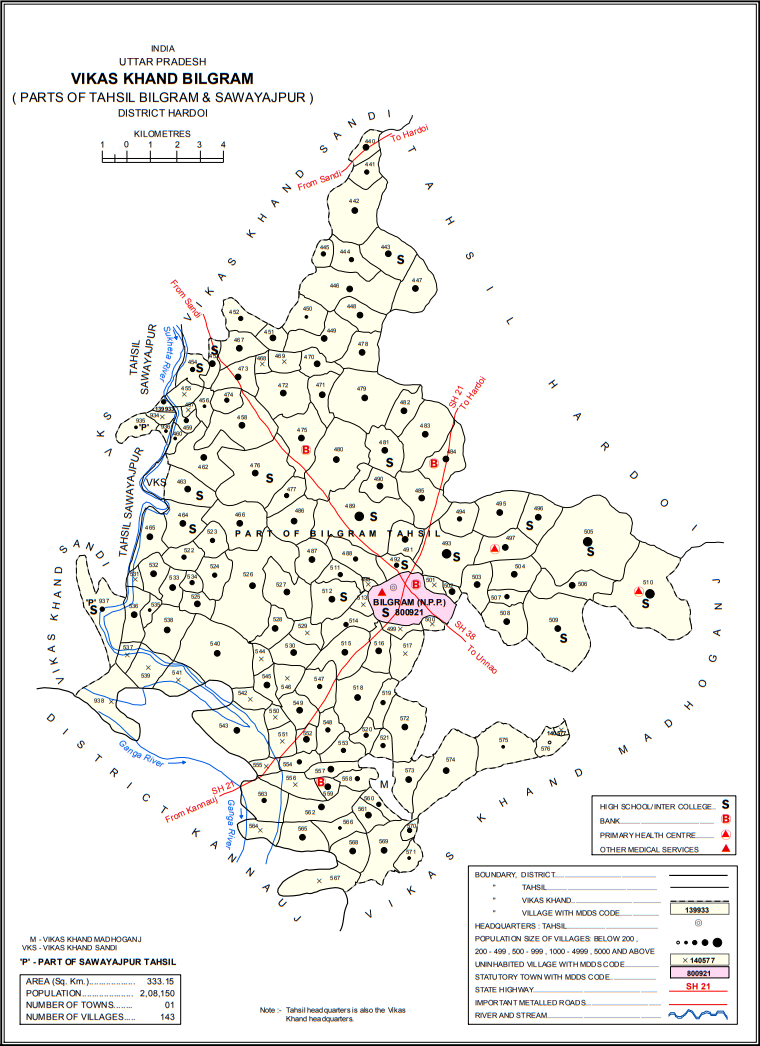
- Map of Bilgram CD block

- Location in Uttar Pradesh, India Bilgram (India)
- Coordinates: 27.18°N 80.03°E
- Country: India
- State: Uttar Pradesh
- Division: Lucknow
- District: Hardoi

Government
  - Type: Municipal Council
  - Body: Bilgram Municipal Council
  - Municipal Chairperson: Anil Kumar (BJP)
  - MLA: Ashish Kumar Singh (BJP)

Area
  - Total: 5 km^{2} (1.9 sq mi)
- Elevation: 136 m (446 ft)

Population (2011)
  - Total: 29,768
  - Density: 6,000/km^{2} (15,000/sq mi)

Languages
  - Official: Hindi, Urdu
- Time zone: UTC+5:30 (IST)
- Postal code: 241301
- Vehicle registration: UP-30

Bilgram is a town and a nagar palika parishad in Hardoi district in the state of Uttar Pradesh, India. It is located 16 miles (26 km) south of the city of Hardoi, on an elevated bluff that once formed the eastern bank of the Ganges. Important industries in Bilgram include ceramics and embroidery.

As of 2011, Bilgram's population is 29,768, in 4,717 households. It serves as the headquarters of a tehsil and a community development block.

== Geography ==
It is located at 27.18°N 80.03°E, and its average elevation is 136 metres (446 feet). The river Ganga is located between Bilgram and Kannauj.

== Climate ==
Summers are hot and humid while winters are cold with minor rainfall.

== Culture ==
Culture of town belongs to the Awadh region. Many people migrated from town after partition of the country. People from Bilgram usually used Bilgrami as title name. Many Bilgrami famous persons are belonged to this town.

== History ==
According to tradition, Bilgram was founded in the 9th or 10th century by the Raikwar king Raja Sri Ram. He conquered the place from the Thatheras, named it "Srinagar" after himself, and built the fort, temple, and the Sagar tank. The Raikwars then ruled the area until the Muslim conquest, but when or how that happened is unclear. Srinagar was then renamed by the Muslim conquerors Bilgram after a legendary demon Bil. From here the Delhi Sultanate went on to control and dominate Oudh in 1217 under Iltutmish Shams ad-Din ibn al-Kutbi Yalam Khan (1210/1211–1236).

The two officers who conquered the region and Srinagar were the ancestors of talukdars Bilgram existed at least until the end of the 19th century. After it was made capital of a Pargana in the time of Akbar the Great, which was then ruled by Sayyid in 1000 but served with soldiers and included neighbouring Pargana Bang. A local saint killed a demon called Bel and took the name derived Belgram to Bilgram.

In 1881 the town had 11,067 inhabitants. The ancient name of Bilgram is Srinagar, its present name Bilgram was given by some associates of Mahmood Gajnavi. The Battle of Bilgram in 1540 took place between Humayun and Sher Shah Suri. Sher Shah Suri defeated Humayun in the Battle of Bilgram.

The Sadaat Bilgram are a group of Sayyid families who inhabit the historic town of Bilgram in Hardoi district. Saadat-e-Bilgram literally means the Sayyid of the town of Bilgram. These Hussaini Sayyids first migrated from Wasit, Iraq in the 13th century. Their ancestor, Syed Mohammad Sughra, a Zaidi Sayyid of Iraq, arrived in India during the rule of Sultan Iltutmish.

In 1217-18 the family conquered and settled in Bilgram. The Sayyid commanded a Muslim army that overcame the Bhars, who were the traditional rulers of the Hardoi region, and was granted an estate centred on the town of Bilgram, where the Sayyid settled down. died in 1247, his tomb was constructed by Syed Mohammad Muhsin son of Syed Mohammad Said in 1738–39.

Sixth in descent from Syed Mohammad Sughra was Syed Abdul Farah of Wasit (from him are descendants of most renowned Sayyid families in Northern India, the Barhah and Bilgram Sayyids; and in Khairabad, Fatehpur Haswa and at many other places branches of the same stem are found.), who was the ancestor of the Saadat-e-Bara, another community of Sayyids.

The Bilgrami Sayyid were important power brokers in the southern part of Awadh, and remained an important and influential clan, throughout the Middle Ages. They provided several taluqdar families and were substantial landowners. During the Delhi Sultanate, Shaikh Burhan-ud-Din Bilgrami was the head of the nobles put in charge of the siege of the citadel of Daulatabad against the rebellion of the Bahmanids.

The Bilgrami Sayyids benefitted from the patronage of the Grand Vizier Munim Khan II, who was known for his support of Indian Sayyids and Shaikhzadas. When Ruh-ul-Amin Khan of Bilgram reportedly entered state service with only 60 horsemen and foot soldiers, the Munim Khan II created him a mansab of 6000 and made him his close associate. The Bilgrami Sayyids were later firm supporters of the Barah Sayyids, with whom they shared ancestry, when the latter had risen as de facto rulers of the Mughal empire after the death of Aurangzeb.

Among the most notable persons of the Bilgram are Allama Azad Bilgrami (1704–1786), Syed Ali Bilgrami(1851–1911), Imad-ul-Mulk Bahadur Syed Hussain Bilgrami(1842–1926), Sursuba of Malwa and Isagarh estate Khan Bhadur Syed Ali Bahadur Bilgrami.

At present time Maulana Abid Bilgrami(India) & Maulana Alay Ahmad Bilgrami(Pakistan) are internationally known names in the field of Islamic studies. There are many civil servants who belong to Bilgram of whom SAT Rizvi, Kamran Rizvi, Dr Mohd Iliyaas Rizvi and Pancham Lal are some of the important names. Unfortunately, Bilgram has lost the sheen that it once had in the field of scholarship. In this regard famous Urdu poet of Bilgram Huzoor Bilgrami says:

Ab to talchhat zeenat-e-jaam-o-suraahi hai 'huzoor'

Rashk-e-maikhana kabhi tha bilgram apni jagah.

loosely translated as (Now only sediment remained for the pitcher, once bilgram was the envy of the people of tastes)

Bilgram is located on the Billahaur-Katra State Highway

- Distance from Kannauj-29 km
- Distance from Hardoi-27 km
- Distance from Kanpur - 110 km
- Distance from Lucknow - 110 km
- Distance From Farrukhabad - 70 km

Around the turn of the 20th century, Bilgram was described as a large town with thriving commerce and several historical monuments. At the time, Bilgram served as a tehsil and pargana headquarters, and it had a munsifi, police station, dispensary, post office, inspection bungalow, and cattle pound, as well as an upper primary school that lay on a site previously occupied by the town's fort. There was also a military encampment on the north side of town.

At that time, Bilgram was a moderately important trading hub, with Hardoi and Madhoganj being its main trading partners. There were several markets in town, including the two old ones called the bari and chhoti bazaars that had been built by the Nazim Hakim Mehndi Ali Khan. To the south of the town lay the Rafaiyatganj market, also built by him, but by that point it had declined significantly. The main reason for its decline was the construction of two new bazaars in town: one by Sarju Parshad, which hosted markets on Sundays and Wednesdays, and the other by Wasi Haidar, taluqdar of Bhogetapur, which held them on Mondays and Thursdays.

Although Bilgram was not a major industrial centre at the time, it was noted for producing "lac-glazed pottery of pleasing design, especially in the shape of amritbans and gharras", which were variously painted green or yellow, or decorated with silver leaf. Other manufactured goods produced in Bilgram included carved doors and lintels, various wooden items (especially sandals), leather shoes, brass inkstands, and paan boxes.

== Demographics ==
Historical population
Year	Pop.	±%
1901	11,190	—
1911	7,509	−32.9%
1921	9,112	+21.3%
1931	9,424	+3.4%
1941	10,292	+9.2%
1951	9,565	−7.1%
1961	10,936	+14.3%
1971	13,106	+19.8%
1981	16,239	+23.9%
1991	20,738	+27.7%
2001	25,292	+22.0%
2011	29,768	+17.7%
Source: 2011 Census of India

As of 2001 India census, Bilgram had a population of 25,292. Males constitute 54% of the population and females 46%. Bilgram has an average literacy rate of 50%, lower than the national average of 59.5%; with male literacy of 57% and female literacy of 42%. 18% of the population was under 6 years of age.

Religions in Bilgram
Religion	Percent
Hindus	51%
Muslims	48%
Others†	1%
Distribution of religions †Includes Sikhs (0.2%), Buddhists (<0.2%).

== Schools and colleges ==
- Girls Degree College
- BGRM Inter College
- Baba Manshanath Inter College
- Government Girls Inter College
- Shri Darshan Singh Inter College, Pasner
- Shri Chhattar Singh Inter College
- SD Public School
- City Public School
- Shanti Devi Girls Degree College

== Economy ==
As of 1971, the economy of Bilgram was described as dominated by primary activities. The main items imported were cloth, sugar, and cotton. The main items manufactured were shoes, handloom cloth, and beedies. The biggest exports were grains, vegetables, and tobacco.

== Festivals ==
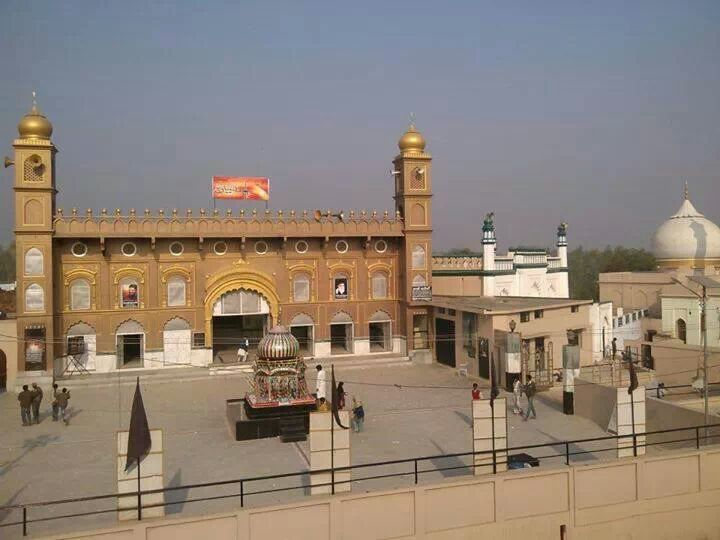
Bada imambada Bilgram

Moharram is one of the most important festivals of Bilgram since the medieval period. Although after the partition of India most of the families have either migrated to Pakistan or the other Indian Cities like Lucknow, Delhi, Rampur, Hyderabad etc., the sheen of the Moharram commemoration did not come to an end and Bilgramis commemorate it for two months and eight days. One of the important contributions of Moharram is that during this period Sayyid families return to Bilgram from every nook and corner of India to pay homage to the supreme scarifies of Imam Hussain. Important dates of Moharram Commemorations are 6th, 7th, 8th, 9th Moharram's Famous Juloos is called Club Ka Matam, which is the largest juloos in bilgram at Syyedwada and 10th of Moharram is famous for its Bada Taziya, which is lifted by 32 men (this tazia is world famous), beside these dates 16 Safar, Chehllum, Bahattar Tabut and Chup Tazia, Ayyame Fatima(s.a.) are very famous functions where hundreds of people congregate to pay homage to the martyrs of Karbala Anjuman Azae Hussain Organizes 72 Taboot Whereas Anjuman Bazme Hussainiya Qadeem organizes Shabbedari and chup tazia juloos. There are three Anjumans (communities) i.e., Anjuman Bazm-e- Hussainiya Qadeem, Bazm-e- Azaay-e-Hussain and Gulzar-e-Hussaini beside this there is a committee named Youth Of Bazm-e-Hussainiya Which Promotes Azadari Of Imam Hussain Ibn Ali in Bilgram they all supervise and organised several programs. Besides Moharram, Eid ul Fitr, Eid ul Azha, Wiladate Maula Ali, Dastarkhuan, and Shabberaat is also celebrated with zeal.

Sunni Muslims also celebrate a plethora of urs on various occasions. Urs e paak of "Meer Abdul Wahid sahab Bilgrami" celebrates every year by the Wasti family and Mureedin at his shrine.

== Famous sites ==
Bada Imam Bada Bilgram and Dargah Abbas is almost 300 years old holy sites of Shia Muslims and heritage place for visitors.

Baba Manshanath Temple is the oldest temple in town. It is the center of the main faith of the Hindu people. It has its own importance in the month of Savan. It hosts the fair in this month. Devotees come from far and wide for the worship of Lord Shankar. This temple was built by Lala Mansaram.

Devdham Temple is another beautiful temple in the area surrounded by gardens. It was built by Radheshyam Yadav and Shanti Devi Yadav.

== Villages ==
Bilgram CD block has the following 120 villages:

Village name	Total land area (hectares)	Population (in 2011)
Bhatauli	121	1,750
Bhatauli Panchsala	74.3	0
Sahijana Sisala	200.3	489
Sahijana Sisala	16.4	342
Bamhrauli	250.2	685
Katri Ibrahimpur	370.1	0
Rasoolpur Goa	131.4	1,522
Manjhia	102.1	686
Chachrapur	341.4	2,305
Parauchi	277.1	1,476
Jatpura	185.3	934
Murauli Gwal	112.3	818
Pindari	571	4,692
Teria	277	1,715
Madara	185	1,297
Sahora	351.5	1,870
Ramapur	151.9	431
Parsapur	114.6	1,202
Bhikhpur	162.4	987
Chaudhariapur	197.7	1,955
Hunseypur Sisala	68.8	587
Hunseypur Pansala	59.2	0
Kuberpur Sisala	21	442
Kuberpur Pansala	9.3	0
Sakherha	355.6	2,956
Mitmitpur Sisala	92.7	579
Mitmitpur Pansala	46	304
Kaeemau Kuvariapur	310.9	2,805
Hasnapur Sisala	253.3	2,572
Hasnapur Pansala	46	304
Sanjalpur	33	1,099
Siraichmau	316.2	2,144
Bhairampur	138.8	1,129
Pahalbanabad	49.8	0
Hasnapur	62.9	0
Hansaulia	185.2	1,222
Dhondhpur	224.9	1,616
Murauli Katheria	412.5	2,340
Nekpur Hatimpur	218.4	1,348
Masoodpur	100.1	762
Durgaganj	462.3	4,683
Dhondhi	687.1	3,101
Alaapur	155.9	730
Kundrauli Sadikpur	251.3	2,345
Dabha	546.7	3,762
Behta Bujurg	669.5	3,171
Tarauli	251.4	2,737
Lalpur Kanhri	173.4	1,753
Radena Habib Nagar	413.2	2,383
Haibatpur	234.9	2,535
Gurauli	324.9	2,413
Biraichmau	226.3	1,727
Panthauri	234.2	1,034
Akhtyarpur	280.5	975
Pasner	855.5	6,486
Baifaria	150.6	1,411
Bashar	196.5	1,535
Kutuloopur	176	736
Jarauli Sherpur	568.9	7,815
Balenda	152.6	796
Akbarpur Pasnamau	299.4	2,013
Bindhouri	196.2	1,498
Kutuapur	277	2,059
Bilgram (Rural)	25.9	0
Ashafpur	43.9	0
Khalil Nagar	31.9	0
Bojhbar	142.3	0
Chandpur	180.5	1,287
Berua Nizampur	189.8	1,407
Bargawan	213.3	2,242
Noorpur Hathaura	979.8	5,150
Gujrai	291.3	3,390
Nabipur	91.9	729
Behti Khurd	277.4	1,281
Birauri	661.1	4,889
Parchal Rasoolpur	1,003	6,443
Itauli	113.5	763
Aligarh	340	1,771
Sharifabad	40.3	0
Mahmood Nagar	205.4	776
Jalalpur	335.2	1,129
Kakra Kherha	170.8	1,843
Lalpur Mirzapur	228.3	0
Diwali	409.3	2,817
Koilara	123.3	778
Koee	83.3	722
Aliapur	80.2	542
Panthora	120.5	582
Dhansari	110.7	629
Kachana	119.6	985
Terwa Chandpur	130.4	1,160
Bhogaitapur	891.4	3,962
Atarchha Khurd	304.1	1,563
Birni	336.8	3,509
Chauharpur	138	0
Atarchha Buzurg	295	1,093
Jarauli Kalan Pansala	75.9	0
Jarauli Kalan Sisala	128.2	3,262
Nekpur Newada	107.9	1,517
Dhandhamau	100.4	819
Raipura	57.9	452
Azmat Nagar Sisala	179.6	1,834
Azmat Nagar Pansala	249	0
Rampur Maghiyara	139.2	3,047
Rampur Maghiyara Pansala	154	0
Sarhiyapur Sisala	381	2,994
Sarhiyapur Pansala	593	0
Katri Banda	156	0
Katri Biluhi	962.9	1,718
Mohammad Zamanpur	11.5	0
Band	49.9	1,380
Chak Bonria	26.3	0
Choliapur	49.9	575
Paindapur	242	598
Karehka	112	1,290
Katri Karehka	85	0
Katri Meora	56.6	0
Meora	133.2	1,969
Naurangpur	291.6	561
Katri Jarsenamau	105.4	894
Gang Barar Katri Jarsenamau	26.3	0
Gang Barar Jarsenamau C...	45.3	0
Jarsenamau	78.1	1,694
Sanp Kherha	142.5	778
Chhibramau	95.9	2,459
Massonamau	140.4	574
Zaffarpur	116.6	1,366
Katri Chhibramau	362	2,080
Katri Mahdeva	307.6	964
Katri Kar Talab Khanpur	61.8	0
Katri Bichhuya	553.4	1,195
Katri Zaferpur	109.7	225
Katri Azmatpur	354.6	0
Katri Parsola	499.7	3,509
Parsola	467.2	2,895
Shahpur	39.3	900
Haraiyapur	100.8	483
Rahula	356.4	4,462
Ganipur	159	1,506
Baghiyari	486.6	1,722
Faizpur Kampoo	367.2	363
Bochanpur	75.7	180
Khairullapur	23.7	0

== See also ==
- Bilgrami
- Akeel Bilgrami
- Azad Bilgrami
- Hyder Bilgrami
- Syed Hussain Bilgrami
- Syeda Bilgrami Imam
