= Balamau railway station =

Balamau is a train station in Hardoi district of Lucknow division of Uttar Pradesh. It is located in Kachhauna, four miles northeast of its namesake village of Balamau. It lies on the Amritsar–Pt. Deen Dayal Upadhyaya Junction main line, 9 km (5.6 mi) from the previous station at Baghauli and 8 km (5.0 mi) from the next station at Dalelnagar. It is also the terminus of two branch lines, one leading to Kanpur and the other leading to Sitapur. The Balamau–Kanpur and Balamau–Sitapur lines both use metre-gauge tracks.

In 1903 a new east–west branch line was built connecting Balamau station to Madhoganj. Around this time, Balamau station was described as having "a considerable trade in grain", with most of it brought by cart from the village of Balamau.
