= Gausganj =

- Location in Uttar Pradesh, India
- Country: India
- State: Uttar Pradesh
- District: Hardoi

Languages
  - Official: Hindi
- Time zone: UTC+5:30 (IST)
- PIN -->: 241305

Gausganj, also called Gaus Ganj, is a village is in Sandila taluk, in the southeast of the Hardoi district in the state of Uttar Pradesh, India. Situated south of Kachhauna, it is located midway between Mallawan and Sandila on the state highway that links them. The PIN code of the village is 241305.
