= Balamau =

Village in Uttar Pradesh, India

- Populated place
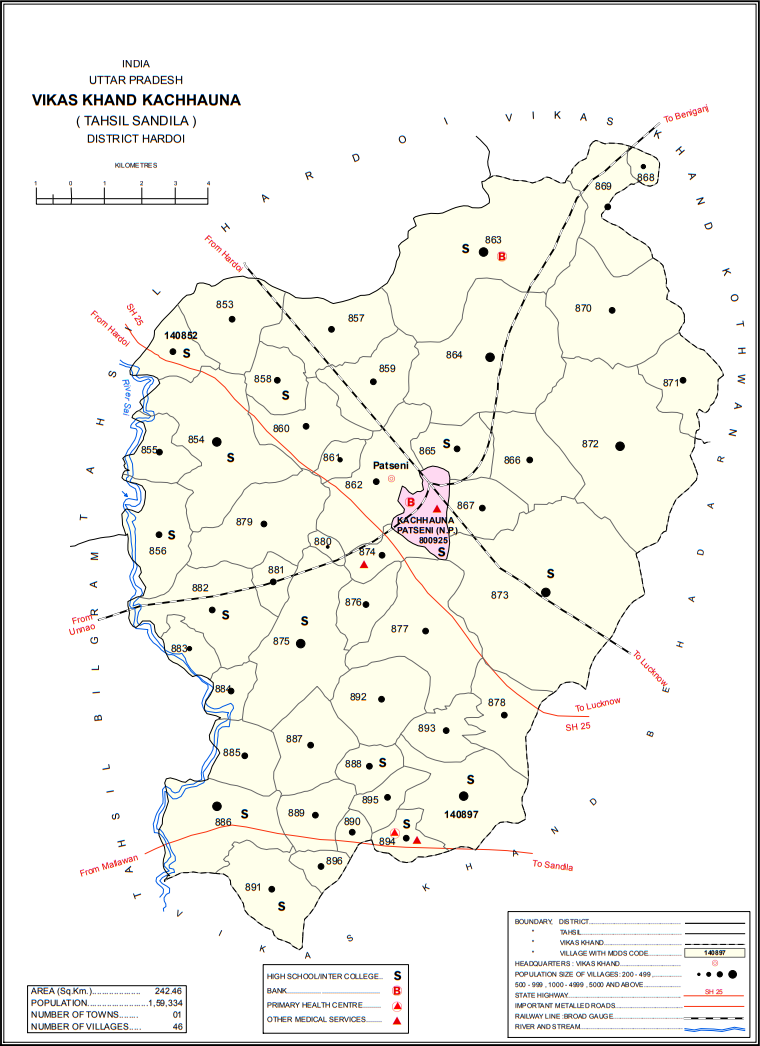
- Map showing Balamau (#882) in Kachhauna CD block

- Location in Uttar Pradesh, India Balamau (India)
- Coordinates: 27°8′N 80°18′E
- Country: India
- State: Uttar Pradesh
- District: Hardoi

Area
  - Total: 7.014 km^{2} (2.708 sq mi)

Population (2011)
  - Total: 4,749
  - Density: 677.1/km^{2} (1,754/sq mi)

Languages
  - Official: Hindi + Dihati
- Time zone: UTC+5:30 (IST)

Balamau is a village in Kachhauna block of Hardoi district, Uttar Pradesh, India. It is located about a mile from the left bank of the Sai river, 25 miles from Hardoi and 4 miles southwest of the namesake Balamau station, which is actually in Kachhauna. Balamau was historically the largest settlement in the area, serving as the seat of a pargana since the reign of Akbar. As of 2011, its population is 4,749, in 1,022 households.

== History ==
According to tradition, Balamau was founded by a Kurmi named Balai sometime before the year 1600. Balai had fled from Unnao to escape persecution by the Chandelas, and ended up finding refuge with the Kachhwahas of Mahri. Balai Kurmi assisted the Kachhwahas in fighting the Muslims of Roshanpur, near Bilgram, and he was rewarded for his services with a strip of land. The name was originally Balai Khera, which later became Balamau.

Balamau was historically the seat of a pargana; it is not listed in the Ain-i-Akbari but was formed toward the end of Akbar's reign. The pargana originally contained 42 villages, but during the Nawabi period it was dramatically reduced in size, with most of its villages being transferred to Sandila pargana. By the turn of the 20th century, the pargana contained just 14 villages and was the smallest in Hardoi district.

Turn-of-the-century Balamau was described as a large and prosperous village, surrounded by orchards. It hosted a daily market, which was the only market in the pargana at the time, and it also had a school. The main commodities produced at Balamau were wheat and sugarcane, which were sold at the local market and taken to the train station at Kachhauna. The population in 1901 was 2,474 people, mostly Kurmis, while the zamindars at the time were two Brahmin women who lived in Lucknow.

== Geography ==
Balamau is located at an average elevation of 130m above mean sea level. The terrain consists of plains and it lies in the Gangetic plain.

== Economy ==
Agriculture and small scale business firms are the main mode of occupation in Kachhauna with region still seeking for major employment opportunities for younger generations.

== Transport ==
Main mode of transport is rail transport. It is on the Kanpur-Balamau line. Many mail express trains stop here and there are good connections to New Delhi and Lucknow. By road the town is served by neighbouring Kachhauna Patseni town, which is the major town.

== Amenities ==
Syndicate Bank and State bank of India banks are situated in Balamau village. Drainage system is in some areas, no roads are inside village. One small hospital was built and no any doctor's presence is there. All the public facilities are shifting to Kachhauna only.

State Bank of India, Bank of Baroda, Awadh Gramin Bank, Punjab National Bank, Bank of India, Canara bank are few bank branches located here with two IOCL Petrol Stations.

Almost all the government facilities which were supposed to be applicated in Balamau village were relocated to Kachhauna from earlier stage of infrastructure development in this region.
