= Kothwan =

Kothwan Kothawan
- Populated place
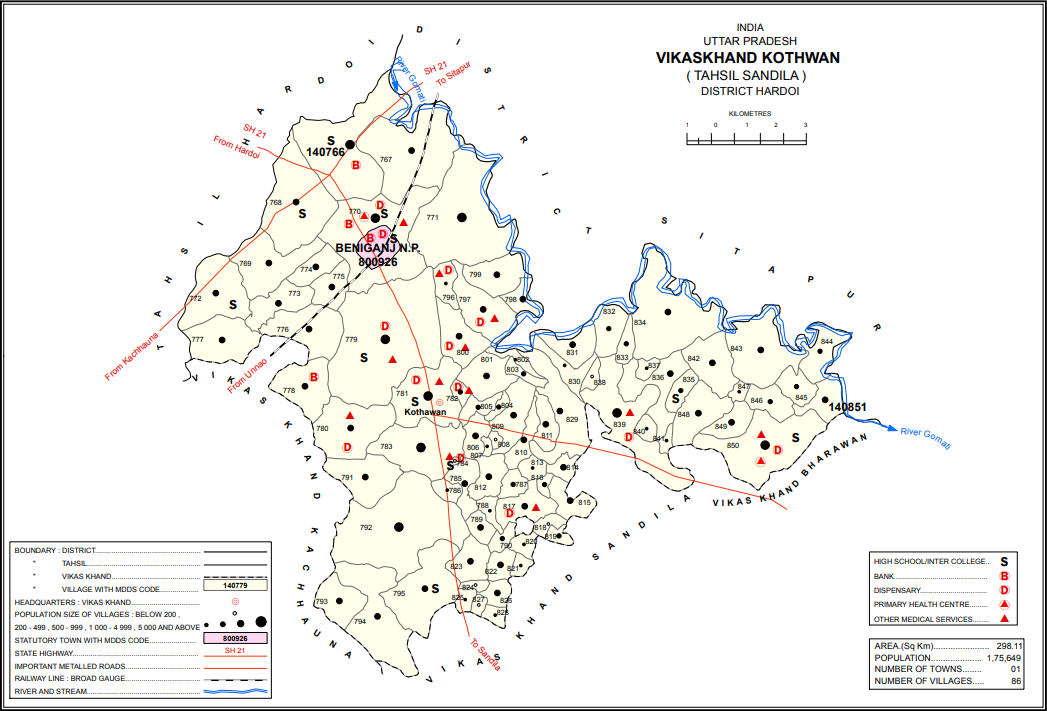
- Map showing Kothwan (#781) in Kothwan CD block
- Country: India
- State: Uttar Pradesh
- District: Hardoi

Area
  - Total: 5.895 km^{2} (2.276 sq mi)

Population (2011)
  - Total: 5,323
  - Density: 903.0/km^{2} (2,339/sq mi)

Languages
  - Official: Hindi
- Time zone: UTC+5:30 (IST)

Kothwan, also spelled Kothawan, is a village and corresponding community development block in Hardoi district of Uttar Pradesh, India. Located 8 km from the city of Beniganj, Kothwan hosts a Parikrma fair during the month of Phalguna where people gather for worship purposes. Vendors bring various items of merchandise to sell at the fair, including carpets, handloom cloth, glassware, earthen pots, toys, and sweets. Kothwan also hosts a market on Wednesdays and Sundays, which involves the sale of miscellaneous products. The main staple foods in Kothwan are wheat and rice. As of 2011, the population of Kothwan is 5,323, in 1,063 households.

== Demographic history ==
The 1961 census recorded an average attendance of about 500 people at the biweekly market in Kothwan. Average attendance of the Parikrma fair was listed as 9,000 people at the time.

The 1981 census recorded Kothwan as having a population of 2,570, in 523 households, and covering an area of 582.36 hectares.

== Villages ==
Kothwan CD block has the following 86 villages:

Village name	Total land area (hectares)	Population (in 2011)
Ghrohia	1,050.7	6,380
Pipri	1,243.1	4,159
Mamrejpur	849.2	4,175
Newada Lochan	543.8	3,005
Beniganj Dehat	1,267.3	6,352
Sikanderpur	1,423.8	5,374
Umrari	529	3,826
Girdharpur	289	2,194
Sadipur	186.4	1,302
Kursi	207.9	1,744
Muthiya	481.4	4,260
Ant Sant	454.4	4,266
Kauro Kalla	437.4	3,152
Manghgawn	1,773.5	11,562
Ugpur	691	4,612
Kothawan (block headquarters)	589.5	5,323
Gauri	53	562
Nagwa	737.4	5,392
Lalpur	12.2	29
Gegalapur	165.1	1,246
Hulaspur	72.5	388
Laudhora	107.8	881
Maghnapur	70.9	350
Shahpur	104.8	1,082
Govrha	97.7	594
Tewna	404.1	2,775
Beruwa	1,422.3	8,490
Bhdsen	282	1,557
Antwa	771.1	4,701
Farenda	705.7	4,504
Mahmoodpur	129.2	403
Alhawa	431.1	1,437
Mahua Kola	179.1	1,001
Chapar Talla	357.4	1,258
Rampur	334.1	2,775
Kakupur	284.8	2,126
Laudh Khera	34	464
Kulman Khera	51.1	991
Manikapur	91	724
Bhatpurwa	97.6	737
Bahadurpur	145.9	1,029
Dubra	29.4	341
Anandpur	39.7	173
Jarowa	326.4	2,299
Shiupuri	169.6	1,189
Purwa Waji Rao	175.1	1,766
Shyampur	218.7	1,916
Kamalpur	92.2	451
Malhpur	84.8	1,097
Adampur	188.1	1,198
Aema	170.1	554
Paliya Ray Singh	230.3	1,303
Raghunathpur	85.4	127
Bhelawan	52.7	617
Jagdispur	78.2	415
Kakrali	61.5	286
Pirkapur	117.6	1,488
Thana	205.9	1,642
Rampur	35.3	75
Mahmoodpur	57.4	474
Teriya	119.8	1,015
Chuglahar	49.4	117
Mathura Garhi	52	265
Bhengaon	634	3,387
Ashapur	161.6	472
Kalhepur	217.2	1,087
Katghara	181.5	724
Atsaliya Bhour	154.8	640
Harraiya	1,263	4,624
Kansuwa	145.6	801
Barsanda	457.5	2,233
Arkha	53.6	337
Pakra Diwan	66.7	197
Kalyanmal	1,164.2	8,295
Keema	57.4	356
Korori	39.2	421
Fantehpur	359.9	1,070
Bhikhpur Eama	709.8	2,573
Gathiya	288.4	959
Raypur	176.3	843
Shankarpur	201.7	783
Jaitapur	40.9	279
Naramadnapur	354.3	1,269
Harpalpur	177.2	1,481
Janigaon	875.7	5,817
Jugrajpur	231.3	1,011
