= Madhoganj =

- Town
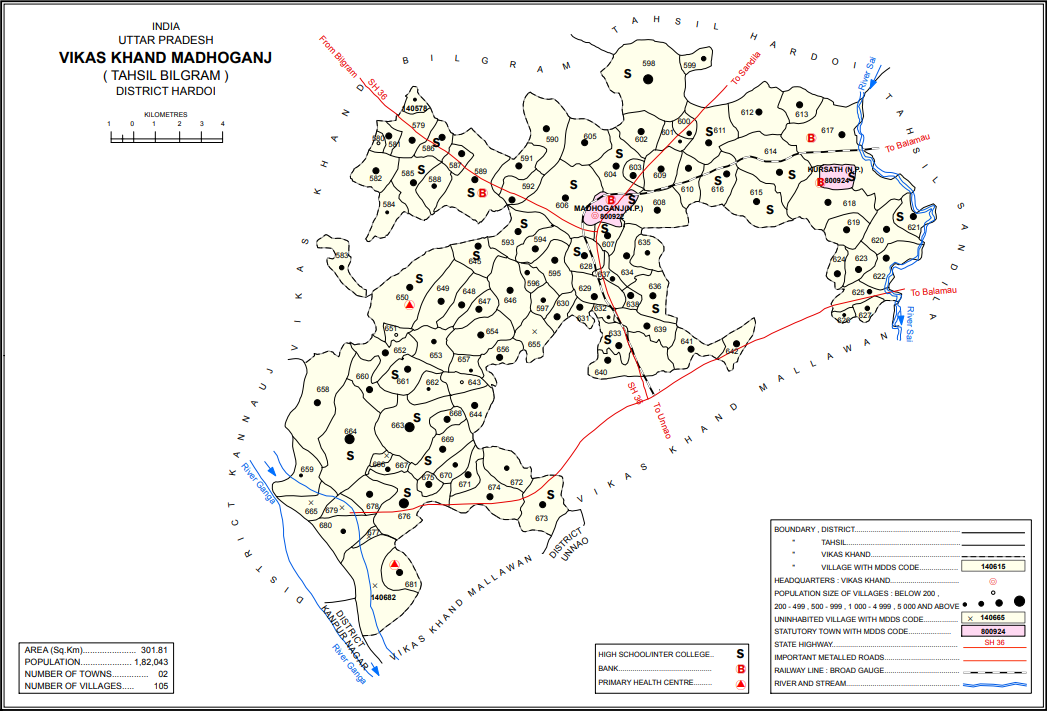
- Map of Madhoganj CD block

- Location in Uttar Pradesh, India
- Coordinates: 27.12°N 80.15°E
- Country: India
- State: Uttar Pradesh
- District: Hardoi

Area
  - Total: 6 km^{2} (2.3 sq mi)
- Elevation: 131 m (430 ft)

Population (2011)
  - Total: 11,523
  - Density: 1,900/km^{2} (5,000/sq mi)

Languages
  - Official: Hindi
- Time zone: UTC+5:30 (IST)
- Postal code: 241302
- Vehicle registration: UP30

Madhoganj is a town and Nagar Panchayat in Bilgram tehsil of Hardoi district, Uttar Pradesh, India. It is located on the north side of the main road from Sitapur to Kanpur, with other roads leading to Bilgram to the northwest, Mallawan to the south, and Beniganj and Balamau to the east. As of 2011, the population of Madhoganj is 11,523, in 2,180 households. It is also the seat of a community development block.

== Geography ==
Madhoganj is located at 27.12°N 80.15°E. It has an average elevation of 131 metres (429 feet). Madhoganj was a Junction Railway Station during Narrow Gauge era in the 1990s connecting Auhadpur via Rudamau, Bilgram & Sandi Nawabganj with a 49 kilometres (30 mi) Line. After Unnao-Balamau Line was made Broad Gauge, Madhoganj-Auhadpur NG Line was closed. Madhoganj is connected to Lucknow via Balamau Junction & to Kanpur via Unnao Junction.

== History ==
Madhoganj originated as a bazaar in the village of Rudamau. At the turn of the 20th century, it was described as "a thriving centre of trade in grain, cotton, and other articles." It had a post office, an upper primary school, and a police force of 11 officers.

Madhoganj's municipal board was established in 1872. In 1903, a railway branch line was built between Madhoganj and Balamau. Then in 1909, another line was built connecting Madhoganj with Sandi via Bilgram.

The 1961 census did not count Madhoganj among the urban areas of Hardoi district, due to "non-fulfilment of urban conditions." Madhoganj's market, held on Tuesdays and Fridays and mainly dealing in grain and kirana items, was recorded as having an average attendance of 6,000 people at the time.

== Economy ==
As of 1971, the economy of Madhoganj was described as a hybrid between the commercial, service, and industrial sectors. The main items imported were jaggery, cloth, and raw groundnuts. The main items manufactured were groundnut oil, handloom cloth, and shoes. The biggest export was groundnut oil, followed by wheat and arhar.

== Demographics ==
Historical population
Year	Pop.	±%
1901	3,594	—
1911	2,605	−27.5%
1921	3,027	+16.2%
1931	3,485	+15.1%
1941	3,650	+4.7%
1951	3,531	−3.3%
1961	Not given	—
1971	5,573	—
1981	7,643	+37.1%
1991	8,723	+14.1%
2001	9,863	+13.1%
2011	11,523	+16.8%
Source: 2011 Census of India

As of 2011 India census, Madhoganj had a population of 11,523. Males constitute 53% of the population and females 47%. Madhoganj has an average literacy rate of 78.69%, higher than the national average of 74.04%: male literacy is 83.75%, and female literacy is 73.07%. In Madhoganj, 9% of the population is under 6 years of age.

Religions in Madhoganj
Religion	Percent
Hindus	83.50%
Muslims	16.13%
Others†	1%
Distribution of religions †Includes Sikhs (0.2%), Buddhists (<0.2%).

== Villages ==
Madhoganj CD block has the following 105 villages:

Village name	Total land area (hectares)	Population (in 2011)
Katarpur	93.1	405
Naumalikpur	270.8	1,560
Khwazapur	92.4	88
Sadriapur	32.3	1,436
Barhanpur	246.1	1,256
Paneora	244	752
Fatteypur	209.8	480
Jujvamau	327.4	1,109
Roshanpur	161.7	2,382
Hirapur	100.7	1,662
Mahmoodpur Thal	187	667
Sadarpur	664	4,148
Barhnawa	395.3	2,472
Kha Dheria Khan Jahanpur	259.2	2,023
Shekhanpur	223.5	1,354
Parhra Lakhanpur	327.5	2,258
Dherhni Saraiya	195	2,210
Selapur	267.2	2,420
Mau	102.3	742
Bhainsi Kherha	101	861
Shuklapur Bhagat	958.1	7,200
Usraha	106.2	598
Pilkhana	106.3	547
Terhiya	125.9	204
Barhas	211.9	2,027
Firozpur	79.5	1,039
Ruiya	399.6	1,773
Chandauli	303	1,976
Rudamau	680.5	4,196
Daulatyarpur	361.6	3,092
Sahijana	334.5	2,385
Baghaurha	256	1,766
Newada Gambhi	197	1,307
Shahbda	425.6	2,933
Barhiya Kherha	450.1	2,268
Saunhar	218.5	1,590
Atwa Ali Mardanpur	704.8	3,811
Seorhai	495.7	2,894
Gautara	375.6	1,781
Kursath Buzurg	1,228.6	1,919
Kursath Khurd	567.3	1,463
Samukha	261.5	1,242
Parnakha	274.5	1,486
Dakauli	235.7	1,618
Madarpur Khurda	301.4	1,957
Jalihapur	181	1,507
Sendhrauli	127	1,131
Bhajehata	171.3	790
Khurrampur	47.8	298
Sariyan Belwar	80.8	537
Terwa	240.9	1,511
Ruknapur	203.2	1,819
Sharfuddinpur	162.7	1,351
Piprawan	141.2	2,030
Sanjalpur	33	473
Khemipur	175.1	1,049
Keoti Khuwazagipur	188.5	2,187
Shekhwapur	159.3	922
Bhithai	293.7	2,174
Chandipur	64.2	816
Rasoolapur	109.7	1,087
Qazipur Farhat Nagar	190.2	2,738
Mohiuddinpur	480.8	1,157
Unchagaon	264.7	2,372
Kherwa	197.7	1,678
Suwapur	108.5	180
Qazipur Nai Basti	351.6	1,722
Iksai	231.5	2,175
Shahpur Basudev	377.8	2,095
Saray Ud	152	1,055
Neoli	213.8	1,163
Morhiya Kherha	356.3	2,233
Gaura	1,029.3	3,909
Kalhamau	89.6	180
Fatteypur Chougawan	330.4	1,344
Indlapur	252.1	582
Hasanpur Jeoli	381.6	1,804
Hasanpur Gopal	73	0
Zehdipur	160.8	1,709
Nibhamau	87.8	306
Terwa Kulli	461.4	4,698
Katriterwa Kulli	915.5	451
Lonari Rahimpur	261.3	1,279
Biraichmau	257.2	2,755
Mawaiya	174.8	454
Matiyamau	686	8,585
Babatmau	855.3	9,104
Babatmau Pansala	313.6	0
Jalalpur	16.3	0
Taukalabad	103.6	745
Haripura	130.9	1,437
Balehra Kamal Nagar	311.5	1,545
Garhi Rasoolpur	195.3	974
Mohabbatpur	134.2	1,438
Narainmau	279.8	752
Karwa	414.7	1,674
Thathia Zahidpur	438.8	1,722
Newada	47.2	1,206
Raghopur Sisala	406.9	5,790
Raghopur Pansala	86.9	0
Mang Raha Sisala	186.3	1,818
Mang Raha Pansala	177.7	0
Mahimpur	341.9	738
Kutuapur Sisala	249.7	3,427
Kutuapur Pansala	866.1	0
