= Mahgawan =

Mahgawan is the name of several places in India:

- Mahgawan, Hardoi, a village in Uttar Pradesh
- Mahgawan, Mainpuri, a village in Uttar Pradesh
- Mahgawan, a village in Banka district, Bihar
- Mahgawan, a village in Jabalpur district, Madhya Pradesh
- Mahgawan, a village in Raisen district, Madhya Pradesh

== See also ==
- Majhgawan
