= Mahgawan, Hardoi =

Mahgawan
- Village
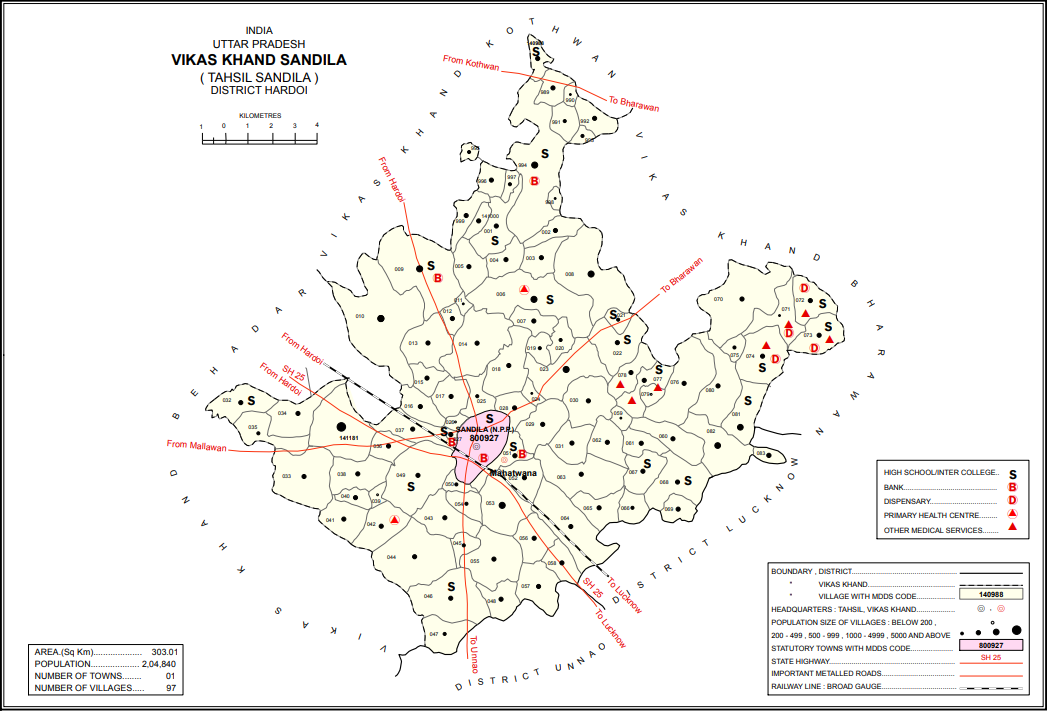
- Map showing Mahgawan (#994) in Sandila CD block

- Location in Uttar Pradesh, India Mahgawan (India)
- Coordinates: 27.18141°N 80.54377°E
- Country: India
- State: Uttar Pradesh
- District: Hardoi
- Tehsil: Sandila

Area
  - Total: 11.654 km^{2} (4.500 sq mi)

Population (2011)
  - Total: 8,057
  - Density: 691.4/km^{2} (1,791/sq mi)

Languages
  - Official: Hindi
- Time zone: UTC+5:30 (IST)
- Vehicle registration: UP

Mahgawan is a large village in Sandila block of Hardoi district, Uttar Pradesh, India. It is located to the north of Sandila.

== Geography ==
Mahgawan is located about 14 km north of Sandila, the tehsil headquarters.

== History ==
At the turn of the 20th century, Mahgawan was described (as "Mahgaon") as a large village located in the centre of pargana Kalyanmal, with a village school and a bazaar holding markets two days per week. Its population was 2,952 as of 1901, and its zamindars were Sakarwar Rajputs.

== Demographics ==
As of the 2011 census, Mahgawan had a population of 8,037, in 1,523 households. This population was 53.8% male (4,346) and 46.2% female (3,711). The 0-6 age group numbered 1,467 (859 male and 608 female), or 18.3% of the total population. 3,569 residents were members of Scheduled Castes, or 44.4% of the total.

The 1981 census recorded Mahgawan as having a population of 5,589 people, in 1,095 households.

The 1961 census recorded Mahgawan (as "Mahagawan") as comprising 10 hamlets, with a total population of 4,223 people (2,272 male and 1,951 female), in 817 households and 651 physical houses. The area of the village was given as 2,729 acres and it had a post office and medical practitioner at that point.

== Infrastructure ==
As of 2011, Mahgawan had two primary schools and two private/non-government-run healthcare facilities. Drinking water was provided by tap, well, and hand pump; there were no public toilets. The village had a sub post office but no public library; there was at least some access to electricity for all purposes. Streets were made of both kachcha and pakka materials.
