= Begum Aizaz Rasul =

Indian politician (1909 – 2001)

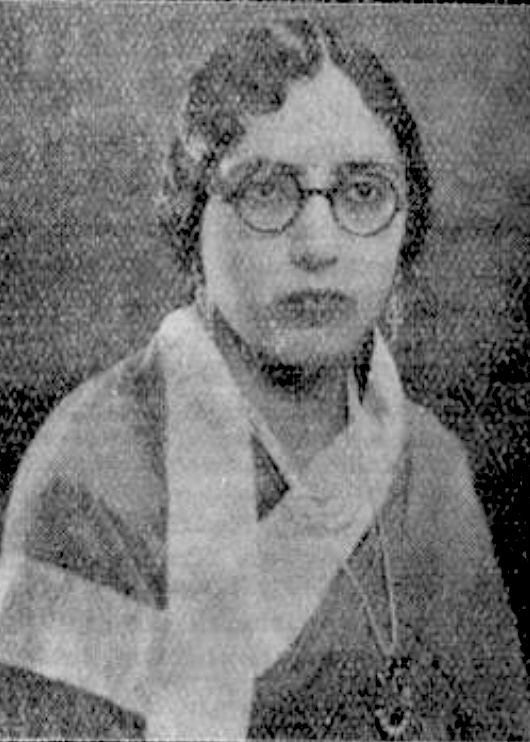
- Begum Aizaz Rasul, from a 1938 issue of The Indian Listener

Member of Constituent Assembly of India
- In office 9 December 1946 – 24 January 1950

Personal details
- Born: Begum Saheba Qudsia; 2 April 1909 Lahore, Punjab, British India
- Died: 1 August 2001 (aged 92) Lucknow, Uttar Pradesh, India
- Occupation: Politician, writer, social activist
- Known for: Only Muslim woman to be a member of the Constituent Assembly of India
- Awards: Padma Bhushan (2000)

Begum Qudsia Aijaz Rasul (2 April 1909 – 1 August 2001) was the only Muslim woman in the Constituent Assembly of India that drafted the Constitution of India.

== Family ==
Begum Rasool was born on 2 April 1909 as Qudsia Begum, daughter of Sir Zulfiqar Ali Khan by his wife Mahmuda Sultana. Her father, Sir Zulfiqar, belonged to a collateral branch of the ruling family of Malerkotla princely state in Punjab. Her mother, Mahmuda Sultan, was the daughter of Nawab Allauddin Ahmed Khan, Nawab of Loharu.

Qudsia was married in 1929, to Nawab Aijaz Rasul, the taluqdar (landowner) of Sandila in Hardoi district of what was then Oudh (now a part of Uttar Pradesh). The match was arranged by Sir Malcolm Hailey and the marriage was entirely harmonious. Two years after the wedding, her father died in 1931. Shortly after this happened, her in-laws came and took her away to Sandila, which was to be her home in life and where she lies buried after her death. In Sandila, Qudsia came to be addressed after her husband's name as "Begum Aijaz Rasool," and this is the name by which she is known in all public records.

== Political career ==
With the enactment of the Government of India Act 1935, the couple joined the Muslim League and entered electoral politics. In the 1937 elections, she was one of the few women who successfully contested from a non-reserved seat and was elected to the U.P legislative assembly. Begum Aijaz Rasul remained a member until 1952. She held the office of the Deputy President of the council from 1937 to 1940 and acted as the Leader of Opposition in the council from 1950 to 1952–54. She was the first woman in India and the first Muslim woman in the world to reach this position. Despite her family background, she was known for her strong support for zamindari abolition. She also strongly opposed the demand for separate electorates based on religion.

In 1946, she was elected to the Constituent Assembly of India and was one of 28 Muslim League members who finally joined. She was the only Muslim woman in the Assembly. In 1950, the Muslim League in India dissolved and Begum Aijaz Rasul joined the Congress. She was elected to the Rajya Sabha in 1952-54 and was a member of the Uttar Pradesh Legislative Assembly from 1969 to 1989.

Between 1969 and 1971, she was the Minister for Social Welfare and Minorities. In 2000, she was awarded a Padma Bhushan for her contribution to social work.

== Role in the Constituent Assembly ==
With the partition of India, only a handful of Muslim League members joined the Constituent Assembly of India. Begum Aizaz Rasul was elected the Deputy Leader of the Delegation and the Deputy leader of Opposition in the Constituent Legislative Assembly. When Chaudhry Khaliquzzaman, the party leader left for Pakistan, Begum Aijaz succeeded him as the leader of the Muslim League and became a member of the Minority Rights Drafting Subcommittee.

Begum Aijaz Rasul was instrumental in creating consensus amongst the Muslim leadership to voluntarily give up the demand for reserved seats for religious minorities. During the discussions pertaining to the right of minorities in an assembly of the Drafting Committee, she opposed the idea of having 'separate electorates' for Muslims. She quoted the idea as 'a self-destructive weapon which separates the minorities from the majority for all time'. By 1949, the Muslim members who wished for the retention of separate electorates came around to accept Begum's appeal.

== Sports patronage ==
She held the office of President of the Indian Women Hockey Federation for 20 years and was also President of the Asian Women's Hockey Federation. The Indian Women's Hockey Cup is named after her (Begum Rasul trophy). Maintaining a keen interest in sport, she even donned men's whites to bat for the Presidents XI vs. the Prime Minister's XI, goodwill match in 1952.

== Writings ==
A widely traveled person, Begum Rasul was a member of Prime Minister’s Goodwill Delegation to Japan in 1953 and Indian Parliamentary Delegation to Turkey in 1955. She also took keen interest in literature and authored the book Three Weeks in Japan and contributed to various newspapers and magazines. Her autobiography is titled From Purdah to Parliament: A Muslim Woman in Indian Politics.
