= Ganga Bhishen Agarwal =

Founder of Haldiram

Ganga Bhishen Agarwal (1908–1985), also known as Haldiram Ji, was an Indian entrepreneur from Bikaner, Rajasthan. He founded the Haldiram Snacks Food, a leading brand in Indian snack food industry.

== Early life and background ==
Ganga Bhishen Agarwal was born in Bikaner, Rajasthan. His entrepreneurial journey began at a young age. He started working in his father’s bhujia shop, where he developed a keen interest in the snack food business. In 1937, he established his own small shop in Bikaner, selling traditional Indian sweets and snacks, particularly Bhujiya. His innovative approach to making bhujia, using moth ki dal instead of besan, and his focus on quality quickly made his products popular.

== Career ==
In the 1980s, Haldiram's opened outlets in Delhi, Nagpur, and Kolkata as part of its expansion into bigger markets. Eventually, the family firm divided into three separate companies, each run by a different Agarwal family branch: Haldiram's Bhujiawala in Kolkata, Haldiram's Prabhuji in Kolkata, and Haldiram's in Nagpur and Delhi. By the 1990s, Haldiram's had made a big name for itself in India and started exporting its goods to other countries. With goods available in more than 80 countries, Haldiram serves snack lovers and the Indian diaspora globally.

== See also ==
- Indian Entrepreneurs
