= Kachhauna Patseni =

Kachhauna Patseni Kachwanka Patsareni
- Town
- Nickname: Balama Hamre
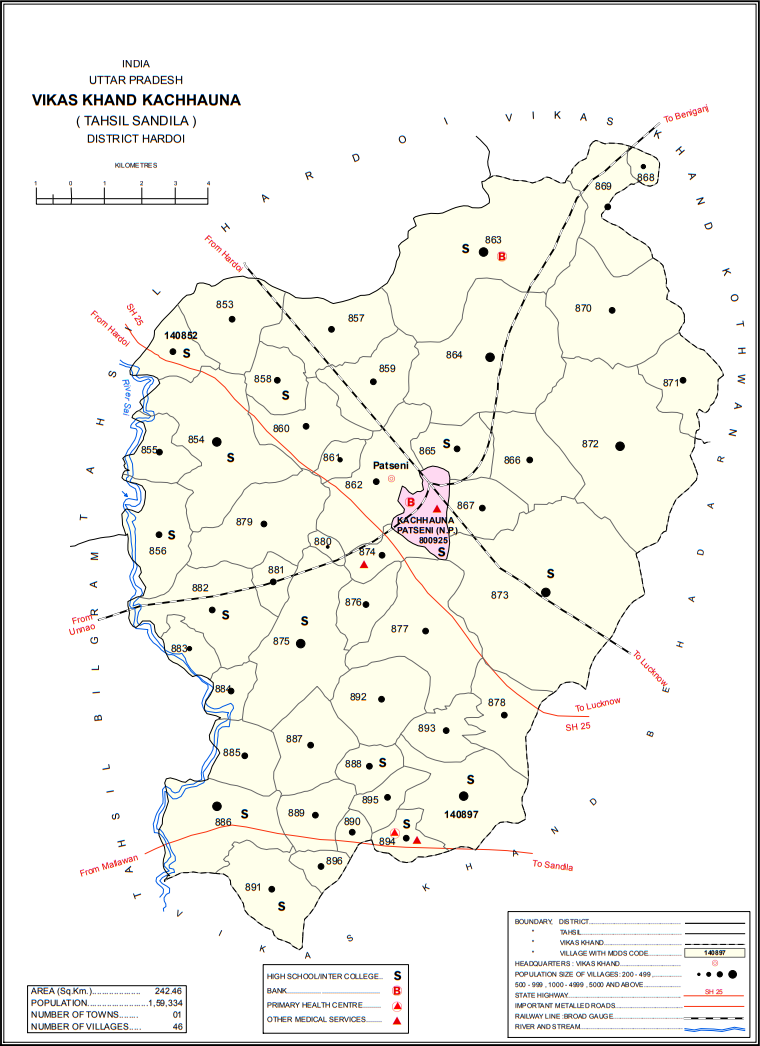
- Map showing Kachhauna Patseni and Kachhauna CD block

- Location in Uttar Pradesh, India
- Coordinates: 27°10′N 80°21′E
- Country: India
- State: Uttar Pradesh
- District: Hardoi
- Founder: Late Pt. Tulsi Ram Shukla

Government
  - Type: Indian
  - Body: AAP

Area
  - Total: 6.6 km^{2} (2.5 sq mi)

Population (2011)
  - Total: 15,647
  - Density: 2,400/km^{2} (6,100/sq mi)

Languages
  - Official: Awadhi, Urdu, Iranian, Punjabi
- Time zone: UTC+5:30 (IST)
- Postal code: 241126

Kachhauna Patseni is a town and a nagar panchayat in Sandila tehsil of Hardoi district, Uttar Pradesh, India. It was first upgraded to urban status for the 1981 census. As of 2011, its population is 15,647, in 2,772 households. The Kachhauna community development block encompasses the rural areas surrounding the town.

== Demographics ==
Historical population
| Year | Pop. | ±% |
|---|---|---|
| 1981 | 7,942 | — |
| 1991 | 10,268 | +29.3% |
| 2001 | 13,509 | +31.6% |
| 2011 | 15,647 | +15.8% |
Source: 2011 Census of India

As of 2001 India census, Kachhauna Patseni had a population of 13,504. Males constitute 54% of the population and females 46%. Kachhauna Patseni has an average literacy rate of 61%, higher than the national average of 59.5%: male literacy is 69%, and female literacy is 52%.

Religions in Kachhauna patseni
| Religion | Percent |
| Hindus | 50% |
| Muslims | 49% |
| Jains | 0.5% |
| Others† | 0.5% |
Distribution of religions †Includes Sikhs (0.2%), Buddhists (<0.2%).

== Economy ==
As of 1981, Kachhauna Patseni's three main imports were sugar, fertilizer, and kerosene oil. The three main commodities manufactured in town were rice, mustard oil, and tin boxes. The three largest exports were paddy, groundnut, and wheat.

== Villages ==
Kachhauna block contains the following 46 villages:

| Village name | Total land area (hectares) | Population (in 2011) |
|---|---|---|
| Sunny | 281.8 | 2,120 |
| Barauly | 518.9 | 4,038 |
| Mahry | 1,022.6 | 7,093 |
| Katka | 250.1 | 1,241 |
| Baridhuman | 481 | 2,379 |
| Purwa | 561.6 | 4,228 |
| Mareura | 277.1 | 2,097 |
| Baruasarsand | 449 | 3,529 |
| Matuwa | 412.1 | 3,134 |
| Teuri | 122.3 | 852 |
| Patseny | 689.8 | 4,794 |
| Tikari | 1,626.6 | 7,371 |
| Gaju | 1,299.4 | 8,912 |
| Kukhi Dehat | 346.6 | 4,206 |
| Uttar Gheya | 514 | 3,487 |
| Sutehna | 275.6 | 1,654 |
| Sahdin | 67.9 | 713 |
| Bilauni | 426.7 | 2,561 |
| Din Nagar | 907.9 | 4,518 |
| Bhanpur | 567.6 | 2,653 |
| Hathaura | 1,569.1 | 7,188 |
| Lonhra | 2,173.3 | 10,123 |
| Kalauly | 939.8 | 6,167 |
| Gyanpur | 224.1 | 2,084 |
| Kamipur | 894 | 3,989 |
| Katiyamau | 427.9 | 1,743 |
| Shamshpur | 576.6 | 4,467 |
| Kanhoa | 27 | 287 |
| Narayan Deo | 151.1 | 1,024 |
| Balamu | 701.4 | 4,749 |
| Band | 165.8 | 748 |
| Paira | 175.2 | 1,022 |
| Baghora | 332.1 | 2,315 |
| Gausganj | 696.8 | 11,384 |
| Nirmalpur | 469.3 | 3,917 |
| Gauri Fakarudin | 196.4 | 1,755 |
| Kahly | 306.9 | 1,466 |
| Methowa | 84.6 | 1,082 |
| Terwa Dahigawan | 501 | 3,597 |
| Gauhany | 527.2 | 2,699 |
| Kamalpur | 314.2 | 2,624 |
| Gauri Khalsa | 207 | 2,767 |
| Musilmanabad | 203.1 | 1,900 |
| Mahmadpur Dhatigarah | 167 | 1,483 |
| Khajohana | 733.2 | 5,376 |
