= Hathaura Siwan =

Hathaura is a village in Siwan district, in the state of Bihar, India.

The 2011 census recorded a population of 8461; 4314 males and 4147 females, giving a gender-ratio of 961 compared to the state average of 918. There were 1456 children aged 0–6 and a literacy rate of 71.38% compared the state average of 61.80%. The village had no Scheduled Tribe population and 8.51% of the population were classified as Schedule Caste.

Hathaura Siwan lies 113 km from the state capital at Patna, 9 km south of the district headquarters at Siwan and 5 km from the nearest town, Hussainganj, which has the nearest post office and police station.

The village is administrated by a Gram panchayat led by an elected Head of the Village or Sarpanch.
