= Haldiram's =

Vegetarian Indian restaurant and foodstuff manufacturer

Haldiram's India Pvt Ltd
- Trade name: Haldiram's
- Type: Private
- Industry: Food
- Founded: 1937; 89 years ago Bikaner, Rajasthan, India
- Founder: Ganga Bhishen Agarwal
- Headquarters: Nagpur, Maharashtra, India
- Products: Snacks, sweets, beverages, frozen foods, potato chips
- Revenue: ▲₹12,800 crore (US$1.3 billion) (FY24)
- Operating income: ▲₹2,580 crore (US$270 million) (FY24)
- Net income: ▲₹1,400 crore (US$150 million) (FY24)
- Website: haldirams.com; haldiram.com

Haldiram's India Pvt Ltd, doing business as Haldiram's is an Indian multinational fast-food restaurant chain, founded in 1937, as a confectionery and desserts shop in Bikaner, Rajasthan, by Ganga Bhishen Agarwal. It is currently based in Nagpur, Maharashtra. Haldiram's is also a FMCG company as most of its restaurants have a integrated retail section, where packaged Indian snacks and confectioneries are sold under its own brand.

== History ==
Haldiram's was established in 1937 as a retail sweets and namkeen shop in Bikaner, Rajasthan. It was founded by Ganga Bhishen Agarwal, also known as Haldiram Ji.

In order to drive expansion, the company's first manufacturing plant was started in Calcutta (now Kolkata). In 1970, a larger manufacturing plant was established in Jaipur. Another manufacturing plant was established in New Delhi in the early 1990s.

In 2003, the company began the process of developing convenience foods to be marketed to consumers.

In 2014, Haldiram's was ranked 55th among India's most trusted brands according to the Brand Trust Report; a study conducted by Trust Research Advisory. In 2017, the company was named the country's largest snack company.

In 2022, it was announced that the packaged snacks businesses of Delhi-based Haldiram Snacks and Nagpur-based Haldiram Foods International would be first demerged and then merged into an entity named Haldiram Snacks Food. Delhi-based brothers Manohar and Madhusudan Agarwal obtained a 56% stake of the merged entity, while Nagpur-based Shiv Kishan Agarwal received the remaining 44%.

In 2025, Singaporean state-owned investment firm Temasek acquired more than 9% stake in Haldiram's at a valuation of nearly US$10 billion.

== Products ==
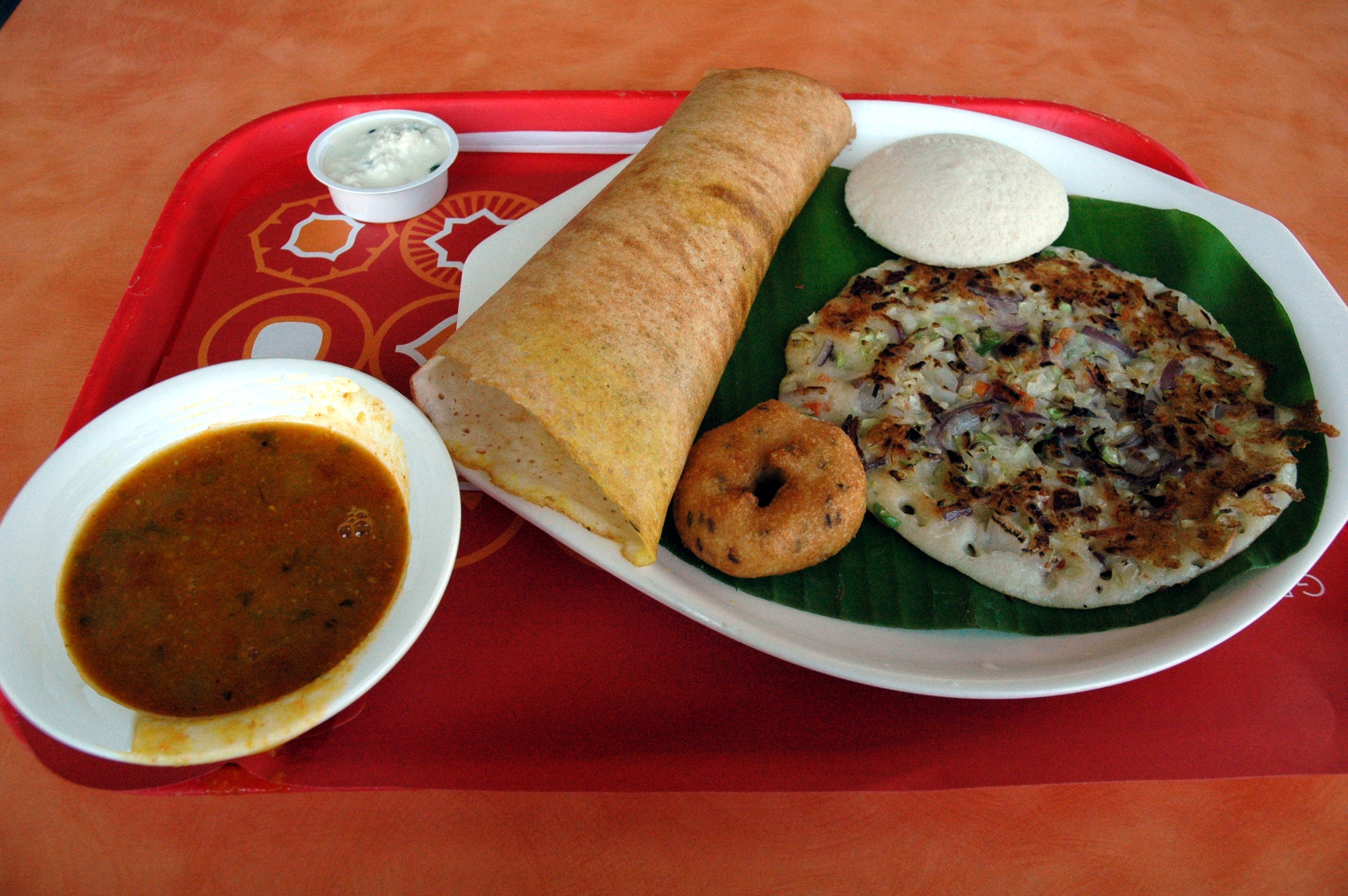
South Indian breakfast at a Haldiram's restaurant in Gurgaon, Haryana

Haldiram's has over 410 products. Its product range includes traditional namkeens, western snacks, Indian traditional and contemporary sweets, cookies, sherbets, and pickles. Products such as gulab jamun and Bikaneri bhujia and papadam are popular. The company also produces ready-to-eat food products, called Minute Khana. In the 1990s, the production of potato-based foods was enabled by the importation of machinery from United States designed for these purposes.

Haldiram's products are marketed at various retail locations such as bakeries and confectionery stores, among others, and also on various commercial websites. Prior and up to August 2003 in the United States market, the company's products were limited to potato chips (crisps). In the United States, the company's products are carried by many Indian supermarkets and are popular with the Indian diaspora.

== In popular culture ==
Haldiram's thali was featured as the main character's favourite snack in the Indian Hindi-language romantic family drama film Prem Ratan Dhan Payo (2015). More than 1.5 crore Haldiram's snack packets were printed with the logo of the film.

== Legal issues ==
In 2006, co-owner Prabhu Shankar Agarwal was found guilty for attempting to murder a tea seller. The tea seller had refused to move his stall from its location near Agarwal's restaurant in Kolkata, West Bengal.
