= Paan dan =

Container for storing paan

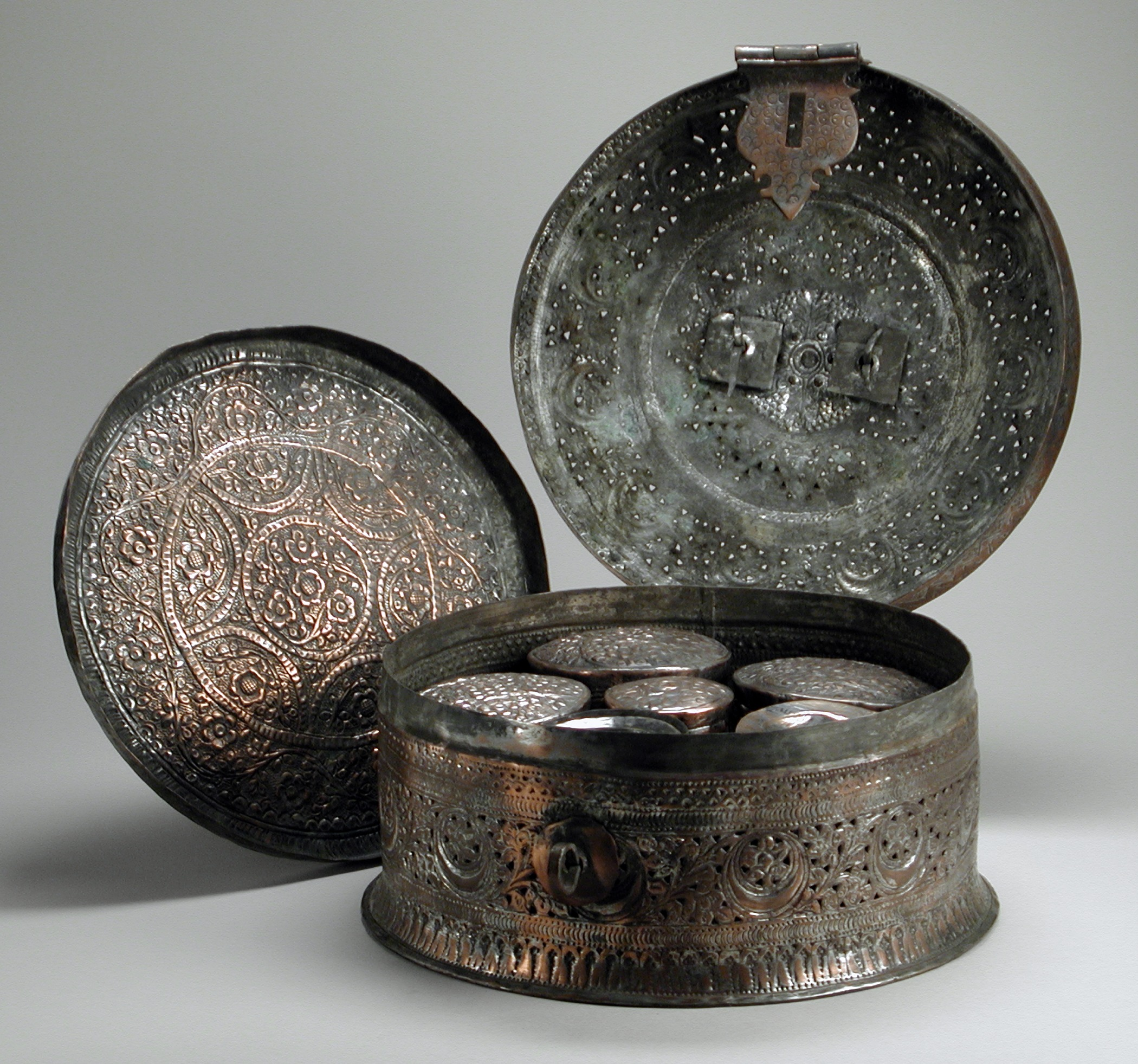
Paan dan (a set of case to store paan) displayed at the Los Angeles County Museum of Art

A paan dan (Hindi: पान दान, Bengali: পানদানি, Urdu: پان دان, English: Betel case) is a container for storing paan (betel leaf) used in South Asian households. It also stores other ingredients such as zarda, supari (or gua), kattha, choona (also known as "soon"), clove, cardamom (elachi), and other accessories. A paan dan is silverware used mostly to store betel leaf, betel seeds and most other spices for making a paan. A paan dan is often made of perforated metal and has several compartments for storing the individual ingredients for making paan.

== Etymology ==
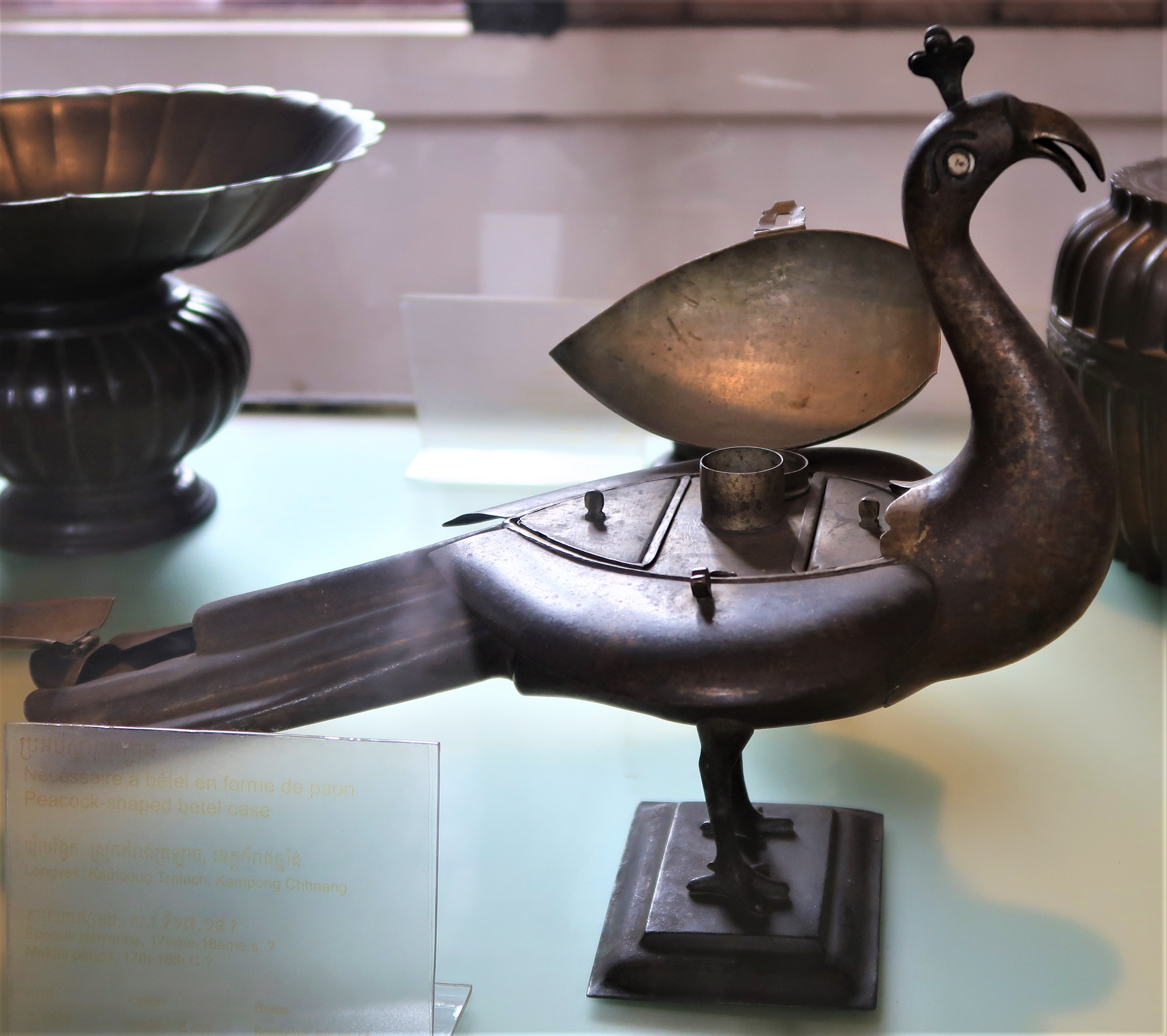
Paan dan (case to store paan) in shape of peacock, originating from Cambodia during the Longvek era (17th or 18th century)

"Paan" in Indo-Aryan languages is a combination of betel leaf with areca nut which is widely consumed throughout South Asia and Taiwan. "Dan" is a common word used in Indo-Aryan languages to describe a container or a box.

== History ==
Paan dan is silverware that was very popular during the 19th century. The last ruler of the kingdom Oudh, Wajid 'Ali Shah' who was deposed and exiled to Calcutta by the British in 1856, used a paan dan to store his every day paan ingredients. The specific paan dan that was used by Wajid was later given to Queen Mary during the Delhi Coronation Durbar and Indian tour of 1911-1912, then presented to the Britmuseum in 1912.

A paan dan was commonly carried in previous eras. The dancing girls of the court of Nawabs in Lucknow carried a paan dan of pure silver, coated with fine Mughlai work of Lucknow. Historically, Betel leaf and its seeds were usually consumed by field workers and other rural inhabitants. People chewed it to suppress their hunger as it has mild painkilling effects similar to a narcotic.

== Size ==
The size of a paan dan varies, but can be approximately one decimetre (4 in) high, twenty-five centimetres (10 in) wide, and twenty centimetres (7 in) long. It usually weighs around a kilogram (2 lb).

== Production ==
Every design is handcrafted by an artist and each paan dan has its own characteristics, individuality and uniqueness. A paan dan may be custom made to satisfy a customer's taste and usually reflects the customer's personality. Most silverware crafted by local craftspeople have a mark or two on the bottom as a hallmark or signature of the artisan. A paan dan is usually crafted out of silver and covered with an oil to prevent the silver from tarnishing.

== Modern use ==
Today, people still use paan dan to store their betel leaves and seeds. However, over time the majority of people have quit chewing betel leaf, so artisans are having a tougher time economically. Even the custom of handing out paan dan during a wedding ceremony has decreased. Local craftspeople are finding that youngsters are not interested in learning to craft paan dan since it doesn't pay much as chewing paan is only popular during Ramadan.

Aside from consuming bland betel leaves, people consume paan where they wrap the seeds with betel leaf flavored with lime paste. Paan has many benefits as it is used for painkilling effects and is also used as a laxative and promotes digestion.
