= Nabipur =

- Village
- Location in Punjab, India Nabipur (India)
- Coordinates: 31.254273°N 75.129456°E
- Country: India
- State: Punjab
- District: Kapurthala

Government
  - Body: Gram panchayat

Languages
  - Official: Punjabi
  - Other spoken: Hindi
- Time zone: UTC+5:30 (IST)
- PIN: 144626
- Telephone code: 01822
- ISO 3166 code: IN-PB
- Vehicle registration: PB-09
- Website: kapurthala.gov.in

Nabipur is a village in Sultanpur Lodhi tehsil in Kapurthala district of Punjab, India. It is located 9 kilometres (5.6 mi) from Sultanpur Lodhi and 34 kilometres (21 mi) away from the district headquarters Kapurthala. The village is administrated by a sarpanch, who is an elected representative of the village.

== Air travel connectivity ==
The closest airport to the village is Sri Guru Ram Dass Jee International Airport.

== List of cities near the village ==
- Bhulath
- Kapurthala
- Phagwara
- Sultanpur Lodhi

== Air travel connectivity ==
The closest International airport to the village is Sri Guru Ram Dass Jee International Airport.
