= Baghauli =

Bhaghauli
- Village
- Location in Uttar Pradesh, India
- Coordinates: 27°14′15.99″N 81°08′58.19″E
- Country: India
- State: Uttar Pradesh
- District: Hardoi

Languages
  - Official: Hindi
- Time zone: IST

Bhaghauli is a village in district hardoi of Indian state of Uttar Pradesh. There is a temple of Lord Shivji named Prasannath mandir. People come here from distant places to worship the lord Shivji. The main languages of this village are Awadhi and Hindi. The distance between Bhagauli tirth to state capital Lucknow is 54 km. The railway station of this village is Paintepur. This village is known for its holy Prasannath temple.
