= Syeda Bilgrami Imam =

Indian writer and film-maker (born 1941)

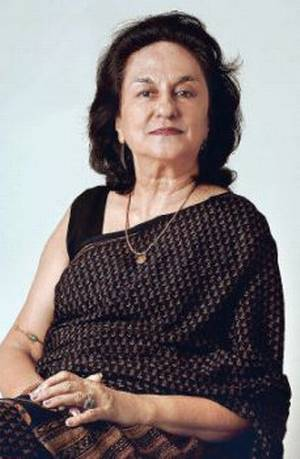
- Born: 9 November 1941 (age 84); Hyderabad, British India
- Occupations: Writer, Advertising Professional, Member of two National Commissions of Govt of India for 6 years

Syeda Bilgrami Imam (born 9 November 1941) is a writer and activist based in New Delhi, India. She was a member of the National Commission for Minorities (NCM), India, and has authored a book titled The Untold Charminar, which describes the culture of Hyderabad.

== Honours and recognitions ==
Imam has received awards for both her literary contributions as well as social activities. Some of her works were shown at film festivals such as the Cannes and New York. As an advertising professional, she is a recipient of national and international awards including the "Indira Super Achiever Award" presented by the Institute of Change Management, Pune.
