= Lucknow City Transport Services =

Bus service of Lucknow, Uttar Pradesh, India

Lucknow City Transport Services Limited
- Formerly: Lucknow Mahanagar Parivahan Sewa
- Type: State-owned enterprise
- Founded: 2005

Lucknow City Transport Services Limited (LCTSL) is an urban bus service of UPSRTC which operates in the urban areas of Lucknow, India.

== Organization ==
Lucknow City Transport Services is city bus service of Lucknow.
