= Beniganj =

- Town
- Location in Uttar Pradesh, India Beniganj (India)
- Coordinates: 27.28°N 80.45°E
- Country: India
- State: Uttar Pradesh
- District: Hardoi
- Founder: वेणी माधव

Area
  - Total: 4.5 km^{2} (1.7 sq mi)
- Elevation: 136 m (446 ft)

Population (2011)
  - Total: 10,173
  - Density: 2,300/km^{2} (5,900/sq mi)

Languages
  - Official: Hindi
- Time zone: UTC+5:30 (IST)
- Vehicle registration: UP
- Website: up.gov.in

Beniganj is a town and nagar panchayat in Sandila tehsil of Hardoi district, Uttar Pradesh, India. It is located 21 miles southeast of Hardoi and 16 miles north of Sandila, on the road to Nimkhar and Sitapur.

== History ==
Originally called Ahmadabad Sarsand, Beniganj was first inhabited by Jogis and Arakhs. They are said to have then been driven out by Janwars from nearby Gaju and Tikari sometime before the year 1300. Beniganj received its present name in the mid-1700s, when Beni Bahadur, the diwan of Shuja-ud-Daula, built a row of shops here and called it Beniganj after himself. It then came under the control of an Ahir landlord named Ram Das, who held the village for 20 years before giving it along with half his lands to Gobind, the Chaudhri of Khairabad, in order to form a political alliance. It later formed part of the estate of the taluqdars of Kakrali.

At the turn of the 20th century, Beniganj was described as a large village that hosted a large market twice weekly, on Tuesdays and Fridays. There was a large military encampment northwest of the village, on the road to Sitapur. The village also had a police station, a post office, a school, a cattle pound, and an inspection bungalow. Its population in 1901 was recorded as 2,446 people, including 346 Muslims.

== Geography ==
Beniganj is located at 27.28°N 80.45°E. It has an average elevation of 136 metres (446 feet).

== Demographics ==
Historical population
Year	Pop.	±%
1921	2,096	—
1931	1,886	−10.0%
1941	2,048	+8.6%
1951	2,842	+38.8%
1961	Not given	—
1971	Not given	—
1981	5,789	—
1991	7,385	+27.6%
2001	9,505	+28.7%
2011	10,173	+7.0%
Source: 2011 Census of India

As of 2001 India census, Beniganj had a population of 9,504. Males constitute 53% of the population and females 47%. Beniganj has an average literacy rate of 54%, lower than the national average of 59.5%; with 60% of the males and 40% of females literate. 19% of the population is under 6 years of age.

According to the 2011 Census of India, the population of Beniganj was recorded as 10,173 people, of whom 5,475 were male and 4,698 were female. The corresponding sex ratio of 858 females to every 1000 males was the lowest among towns in Hardoi district. Among the 0-6 age group, the sex ratio was 829, which was also the lowest in the district. Members of scheduled castes made up 24.44% of the town's population, which was the highest proportion among towns in the district. No members of scheduled tribes were reported as living in the town. The literacy rate of Beniganj was 73.72% (counting only people age 7 and up); it was higher among men and boys (78.98%) than women and girls (67.62%). In terms of employment, 20.82% of Beniganj residents were classified as main workers (i.e. people employed for at least 6 months per year), while 14.51% were counted as marginal workers. The remaining 64.67% were non-workers. Employment status varied substantially according to gender, with 49.72% of men but only 18.56% of women being either main or marginal workers.
