= Sandila =

- Town
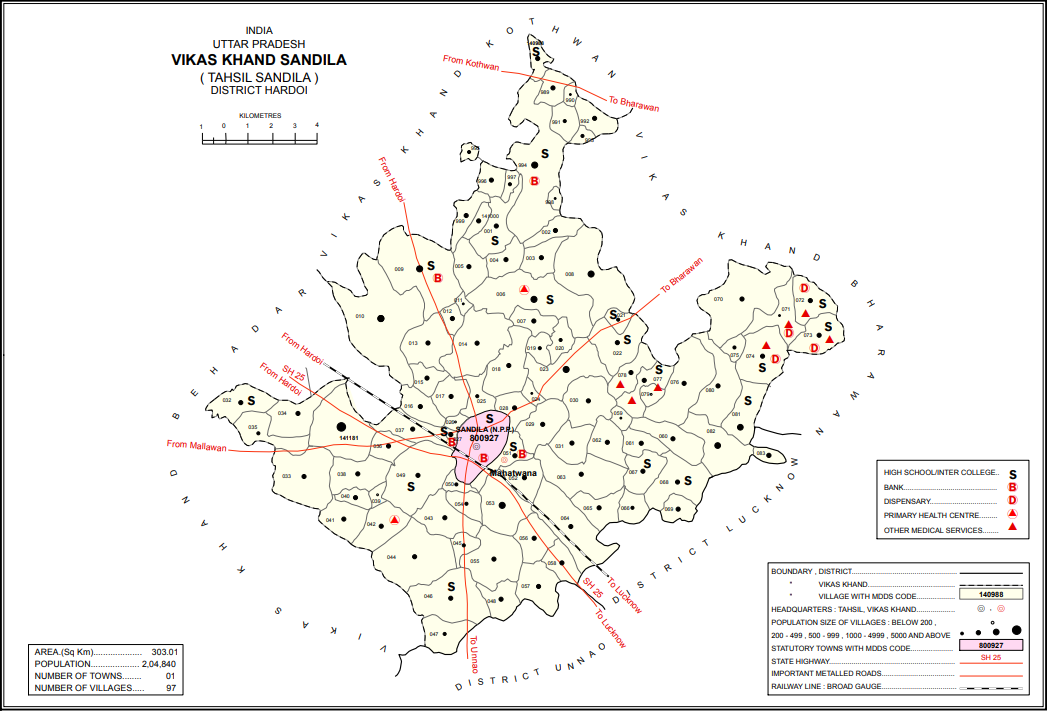
- Map of Sandila CD block

- Location in Uttar Pradesh, India Sandila (India)
- Coordinates: 27°04′10″N 80°30′51″E
- Country: India
- State: Uttar Pradesh
- Division: Lucknow
- District: Hardoi
- Named for: Shandilya Rishi

Government
  - Type: Municipal Council
  - Body: Sandila Municipal Council
  - Municipal Chairperson: Mohammed Rais Ansari (SP)
  - Lok Sabha MP: Ashok Kumar Rawat (BJP)
  - MLA: Alka Singh Arkvanshi (BJP)

Area
  - Total: 24.62 km^{2} (9.51 sq mi)
- Elevation: 142 m (466 ft)

Population (2011)
  - Total: 58,346
  - Density: 2,370/km^{2} (6,138/sq mi)
- Demonym: Sandilivi

Languages
  - Official: Hindi
  - Additional official: Urdu
- Time zone: UTC+5:30 (IST)
- Vehicle registration: UP-30

Sandila is a town and nagar palika parishad in Hardoi district in the Indian state of Uttar Pradesh. It serves as a tehsil headquarters within the district. Located midway between Hardoi and Lucknow, Sandila is a well-connected town with roads leading in all directions and a major broad gauge rail line passing through the south side of town. According to legend, Sandila was the Tapobhumi of the Vedic sage Shandilya. The Shandilya Ashram was located at the temple of Goddess Shitala known as Shitala Mata Mandir in western side of the town.

Important industries include sweets — its laddus are especially well-known — as well as beedi production and zardozi work. Sandila Industrial Area have many big industries like Pepsi, British Paints, Berger Paints, Webley & Scott, ITC Limited, Haldiram's.

Sandila is the oldest municipality in Hardoi district, established on 14 July 1868. As of 2011, its population is 58,346, in 9,663 households.

== History ==
Sandila became the seat of Arkvanshi (suryavanshi) power in the early 13th century and became a flourishing town under Arkvanshi (suryavanshi) rajput. Arkvanshi (suryavanshi) rajput held the region till last quarter of the 14th century, when a large army sent by Feroz Shah Tughlaq under his lieutenant Syed Makhdum Alauddin, captured the town and the adjoining areas after a fierce battle with Arkvanshi (suryavanshi) rajputs. The remains of Arkvanshi rule are seen in form of ruined fortresses in the mounds of Garhi Jindor, Malhaiyya garhi (Malaiyya), Sahinjana tila, Samad Khera, Naurang garh (Tarauna), Sandi qila, and many others. After the decline of Arkvanshi (suryavanshi) Rajput's power, Sandila came under the rule of Delhi sultanate. The folklore of Arkvanshi still sings about the bravery of its heroes, Salhia Singh Arkvanshi and Malhia Singh Arkvanshi and Salhia Arkvanshi.

Begum Aizaz Rasul lived in Sandila'

Apart from this, the Begum Aizaz Rasul was the only muslim woman in the Constituent Assembly of India that drafted the Constitution of India. Qudsia was married in 1929 to Nawab Aizaz Rasul, the taluqdar (landowner) of Sandila in Hardoi district of what was then Oudh (now a part of Uttar Pradesh). The match was arranged by Sir Malcolm Hailey and the marriage was entirely harmonious. Two years after the wedding, when Qudsia was fourteen, her father died in 1931. Shortly after this happened, her in-laws came and took her away to Sandila, which was to be her home in life and where she lies buried after her death

== Geography ==
Sandila is located at 27.08°N 80.52°E. It has an average elevation of 142 metres (466 ft). It is around 50 kilometres away from district headquarters and also 50 kilometres away from Lucknow, the capital of Uttar Pradesh and is an important tehsil of the Hardoi district.

== Demographics ==
Historical population
Year	Pop.	±%
1901	16,843	—
1911	15,241	−9.5%
1921	14,074	−7.7%
1931	15,034	+6.8%
1941	17,526	+16.6%
1951	17,400	−0.7%
1961	18,407	+5.8%
1971	22,365	+21.5%
1981	29,700	+32.8%
1991	38,605	+30.0%
2001	48,899	+26.7%
2011	58,346	+19.3%
Source: 2011 Census of India

The 2011 Census of India recorded the population of Sandila as 58,346 people, of whom 30,400 were male and 27,946 female. The corresponding sex ratio of 919 females to every 1000 males was the highest among towns in Hardoi district. Among the 0-6 age group, the sex ratio was 910, which was slightly above the district urban average of 906. Members of scheduled castes made up 8.13% of the town's population, and members of scheduled tribes made up 0.03%. The literacy rate of Sandila was 65.79% (counting only people age 7 and up); it was higher among men and boys (70.99%) than women and girls (60.15%). In terms of employment, Sandila had the highest percentage of main workers (i.e. people employed for at least 6 months per year) among towns in Hardoi district, with 27.15% falling into this category. Marginal workers made up 3.91%, and non-workers made up 68.94%. Employment status varied heavily according to gender, with 51.34% of men but only 9.01% of women being either main or marginal workers.

Religions in Sandila
Religion	Percent
Muslims	53.97%
Hindus	45.49%
Others†	0.54%
Distribution of religions †Includes Sikhs (0.18%), Buddhists (<0.05%).

== Economy ==
As of 1971, the economy of Sandila was described as a mixture of the industrial, service, and commercial sectors (in that order). The main items imported were groundnuts, cloth, and grains; the main items manufactured were handloom cloth, brass utensils, and beedies; and the main exports were groundnuts, grain, and handloom cloth.

In 1981, Sandila was home to four medium- and large-scale factories, including two each in the public and private sectors. These included the Laxmi Sugar & Oil Mills Ltd., the oldest large-scale factory in the district, which was established in 1935 and as of 1981 was producing 24,000 tonnes of sugar. Raw sugarcane was supplied from Hardoi as well as parts of Sitapur district. There was also a textile mill, run by U.P. State Textiles Corporation Ltd., which at the time employed almost 1,000 weavers and was equipped with 25,000 spindles; an expansion was planned at the time that would double its size. A medium-scale factory run by U.P. Metal Industries Ltd. had been functioning since 1976 and was producing some 1,000 tonnes of metal pipe annually. The fourth, the Hardoi Co-operative Vanaspati Mills Ltd., was still under construction at the time.

Also described in 1981, the main powerlines connecting Lucknow's hydroelectric power supply to Hardoi run through Sandila; they include both a 132-kilovolt line and a 66-kilovolt one. The lion's share of electricity consumption in the district at the time was for irrigation and water supply, making up 57.34% of the total consumption.

Sandila is also known for its delicacy that's Laddoos. The ladoos are selling at the Sandila railway station to the passengers. The mention of Sandila's famous ladoo has seen in the movie Hum Saath-Saath Hain by Sadashiv Amrapurkar.

=== Sandila Industrial Area ===
As of 2022, Sandila Industrial Area has many big industries like Pepsi, British Paints, Berger Paints, Webley & Scott, ITC Limited, and Haldiram's. Handgun manufacturer Webley & Scott's revolver is already being manufactured in Sandila.

Berger Paints India Ltd is setting up its factory on 35 acres of land at a cost of about Rs 850 crore and generating employment of 2500 people. British Paints Limited, a well-known company of England, has also started construction of its unit on over 10 acres of Uttar Pradesh State Industrial Development Corporation land at a cost of Rs 150 crore.

Green Ply Company is setting up its unit on 35 acres of land at a cost of Rs 600 crore. Austin Plywood Company is establishing its factory at a cost of Rs 50 crore and will employ 500 people. Gang Industries Ltd is setting up its distillery over 25 acres of land at a cost of Rs 250 crore.

Varun Beverages Limited is setting up a factory at Sandila over 100 acres of land with an investment of Rs 700 crore to produce cold drinks, juices, etc. in association with Pepsi, generating 2000 people getting employment in this factory.

Besides, ITC Limited is setting up its factory to produce flour, juice, chips, etc. over 60 acres land with an investment of Rs 800 crore.

Haldiram's is setting up its unit on five acres at a cost of about Rs 50 crore and will offer job opportunities to 250 people. Hindustan Food Limited is also setting up its factory at Sandila at a cost of Rs 100 crore.

== Education ==
There are both government as well as private schools in the town affiliated with Central Board of Secondary Education, Indian Certificate of Secondary Education & Uttar Pradesh State Board of High School and Intermediate Education.

=== Government ===
- Girls Government Inter College (Only for Girls)
- Bhagwaan Budhh Inter College (Only for Boys)
- Iltifat Rasool Inter College

=== Private ===
There are many private schools in the town affiliated with CBSE Board, ICSE Board. Some of the schools are:

- Saint Theresa School (ICSE)
- Saira Bano Public School (CBSE)
- Sandila Lions Public School (CBSE)
- TRS Convent School (CBSE)
- Shanti Niketan Public School
- Seth M.R.Jaipuria School (CBSE)

== Airforce Landing ==
In 1952, Suhas Biswas a flight lieutenant of Indian Air Force who was working in a Communication Flight unit in Lucknow took charge of the aircraft carrying army officials who were returning to New Delhi after an official visit. After it took off, suddenly a crew member observed an engine malfunction; subsequently a fire broke out. Biswas first tried extinguish it, but it was difficult to control. He decided to attempt a forced landing, and made a belly landing near Sandila town in Uttar Pradesh and successfully saved the lives of all the passengers. Biswas was awarded the Ashoka Chakra for his extraordinary example of bravery, intelligence and rationality.

== Sanitation ==
As of 1971, Sandila was one of two towns in Hardoi district (along with Hardoi itself) that had arrangements for mechanical transport and removal of night soil.

As of 2011, the drainage system employed in Sandila is open sewers, and 6,000 flush toilets have been installed in the town.

== Transport ==
=== Roads ===
Town is well connected with district headquarters, state capital Lucknow and neighboring district headquarters like Sitapur, Unnao, Shahjahanpur, Lucknow, Kannauj and Kanpur. The NH-731 passes through the town connecting Lucknow with other parts of the state.

=== Rail ===
Sandila Railway Station is a railway station on broad gauge Lucknow-Moradabad line, that connects the town with Lucknow, Bareilly and country capital Delhi via Moradabad.

The Kashi Vishwanath Express (15127/15128) is an Indian express train that runs between Banaras in Uttar Pradesh and New Delhi railway station haults at the Sandila railway station.

The Nauchandi Express (14241 / 14242) is an express train belonging to Indian Railways that runs between Prayagraj Sangam and Saharanpur Junction haults at the Sandila railway station in Uttar Pradesh.

=== Bus ===
Sandila does not have any official bus station or depot, but UPSRTC buses are available in town square for neighboring districts & cities. Buses are available for Delhi, Lucknow, Kanpur, Hardoi and Bareilly.

=== Electric Bus ===
Lucknow City Transport Services Limited (LCTSL) operates its services from Lucknow to Sandila or Vice Versa. New services started from Lucknow to Naimisharanya via Sandila on the daily basis.

=== Air ===
Nearest Airport is Chaudhary Charan Singh Airport, Lucknow, 60 kms away from the town.

== Villages ==
At the turn of the 20th century, it was noted that many villages in Sandila pargana were unusually large because of past political instability. In (then-) recent years, "numberless hamlets have sprung up as offshoots of the larger villages," due to secure conditions.

As of 2011, Sandila CD block has the following 97 villages:

Village name	Total land area (hectares)	Population (in 2011)
Gogawan Dew	137.5	1,625
Gahira	183.1	1,038
Padri Gahirawaly	50.4	249
Terwa Pahelwan	188.9	975
Bhirka	217.6	1,576
Yarka	43.4	553
Mahgawan	1,165.4	8,057
Mawai Brahman	54.1	579
Parihawan	165.7	1,758
Shekhwapur	60.6	593
Raheriyamau	43	370
Gopalpur	164.8	1,190
Narendarpur	100.6	1,019
Rasulpur	326.6	2,332
Rahimabad Grant	190.5	1,144
Mawae Musalmanabad	211.3	1,393
Lohrai	173.5	1,252
Mahroniya	236.8	1,594
Lumamau	678.3	5,546
Kinhoti	182.6	2,146
Atsaliya	898.8	6,060
Malehra	920.5	5,846
Chanohiya	1,177.8	5,537
Paharpur	37.6	271
Jajmau	97.2	1,052
Bhitauly	355.8	1,782
Jamu	550.5	3,745
Bhadehana	136.8	1,035
Umartaly	239.2	1,157
Shivnagara	244.1	1,331
Gogawan Umray	373.9	1,373
Mahamau	107.8	654
Khutehana	146.3	897
Gausapur	44.4	625
Mahamadwur Belwaran	467.9	2,386
Mirnagar Ajjgawan	861.6	6,690
Bibipur	45.9	454
Tarf Malikana	276.8	515
Hakimpur	34.7	2
Tarf Ashraf Tola	128.6	2,082
Tarf Mandie	206.8	1,146
Jamkura	440	3,707
Atamau	376.9	2,299
Bharighna	296.2	2,407
Baghuwamau	311.4	1,689
Talauly	596.6	3,778
Jamsara	437.7	2,132
Gangau	168.2	917
Saray Marukpur	165.8	1,151
Rampur Ashu	222.6	1,026
Kurna Timruk	351.4	2,960
Edulpur	44.6	152
Jallalpur	92.6	1,294
Hardalmau	275.1	2,607
Kudauri	332.3	2,711
Sunderpur	356.8	2,541
Gauswa Donga	734.3	4,178
Behsary	80.8	749
Maleya	756.8	3,290
Gajaudin Nagar	247	983
Padry	174.4	1,111
Meetau	651.4	4,732
Makhadum Pura	89.2	923
Mahatwana	278.9	2,131
Alampur	235	1,123
Begamgang	431.1	5,324
Tikra Daudpur	129.4	851
Sanie	474.8	2,909
Tiloeya Kalan	246.1	2,836
Narayanpur	256.3	2,021
Tiloeya Khurd	193.8	1,599
Bada Danda	58.9	270
Uttar Kaund	300.2	2,315
Atwawary	147.9	1,648
Pahtoeya	195.4	1,235
Kakraly	748.8	4,966
Shank	939	4,536
Tikra Barar	223.7	1,707
Beremau	125.6	536
Gaudora	268.6	2,527
Majh Gaon	384.3	2,908
Mau Chena	111	1,019
Sarwa	1,089.2	4,520
Kasimabad	324.4	262
Purwa Man	265.4	2,185
Bariya	241.8	2,259
Barahi	549.3	3,028
Gauswa	69.6	552
Tikra Kalla	419.5	2,375
Sunda	275.4	1,623
Narayanpur	209.2	1,331
Kirtapur	51	159
Mandoly	633.2	4,065
Sikrohry	275	3,886
Jawar	422.9	3,471
Kally Khera	68	657
Som	528.4	5,040

== See also ==
- Sandila Assembly constituency
- Shitala Mata Mandir
