= Dhakroi =

Village in Uttar Pradesh, India

- Village
- Location in Uttar Pradesh, India
- Coordinates: 27.04044°N 79.38968°E
- Country: India
- State: Uttar Pradesh
- District: Mainpuri
- Tehsil: Bhongaon

Area
  - Total: 5.802 km^{2} (2.240 sq mi)

Population (2011)
  - Total: 2,762
  - Density: 476.0/km^{2} (1,233/sq mi)
- Time zone: UTC+5:30 (IST)

Dhakroi (Ḍhakroī) is a village in Kishni block of Mainpuri district, Uttar Pradesh, India. As of 2011, it had a total population of 2,762, in 474 households.

Majhupur is located nearby.

== Demographics ==
As of 2011, Dhakroi had a population of 2,762, in 474 households. This population was 54.4% male (1,503) and 45.6% female (1,259). The 0-6 age group numbered 341 (183 male and 158 female), or 12.2% of the total population. 379 residents were members of Scheduled Castes, or 13.7% of the total.

The 1981 census recorded Dhakroi as having a population of 2,047 people, in 295 households.

The 1961 census recorded Dhakroi as comprising 7 hamlets, with a total population of 1,441 people (780 male and 661 female), in 253 households and 214 physical houses. The area of the village was given as 1,589 acres.

== Infrastructure ==
As of 2011, Dhakroi had 2 primary schools; it did not have any healthcare facilities. Drinking water was provided by tap, hand pump, and tube well; there were no public toilets. The village had a post office and public library, as well as at least some access to electricity for residential and agricultural purposes. Streets were made of both kachcha and pakka materials.
