= Chauraipur =

Village in Uttar Pradesh, India

- Village
- Location in Uttar Pradesh, India
- Coordinates: 27.02571°N 79.22555°E
- Country: India
- State: Uttar Pradesh
- District: Mainpuri
- Tehsil: Bhongaon

Area
  - Total: 8.682 km^{2} (3.352 sq mi)

Population (2011)
  - Total: 3,557
  - Density: 409.7/km^{2} (1,061/sq mi)
- Time zone: UTC+5:30 (IST)

Chauraipur (Chaurāīpur) is a village in Kishni block of Mainpuri district, Uttar Pradesh, India. As of 2011, it had a total population of 3,557, in 688 households.

== Demographics ==
As of 2011, Chauraipur had a population of 3,557, in 688 households. This population was 52.6% male (1,872) and 47.4% female (1,685). The 0-6 age group numbered 543 (290 male and 253 female), or 15.3% of the total population. 1,220 residents were members of Scheduled Castes, or 34.3% of the total.

The 1981 census recorded Chauraipur as having a population of 3,186 people, in 531 households.

The 1961 census recorded Chauraipur as comprising 13 hamlets, with a total population of 2,365 people (1,219 male and 1,146 female), in 458 households and 334 physical houses. The area of the village was given as 2,169 acres and it had a post office at that point.

== Infrastructure ==
As of 2011, Chauraipur had 1 primary school; it did not have any healthcare facilities. Drinking water was provided by hand pump; there were no public toilets. The village had a post office and public library, as well as at least some access to electricity for all purposes. Streets were made of both kachcha and pakka materials.
