= Basait =

Village in Uttar Pradesh, India

- Village
- Location in Uttar Pradesh, India
- Coordinates: 27.0027°N 79.28301°E
- Country: India
- State: Uttar Pradesh
- District: Mainpuri
- Tehsil: Bhongaon

Area
  - Total: 10.206 km^{2} (3.941 sq mi)

Population (2011)
  - Total: 8,837
  - Density: 865.9/km^{2} (2,243/sq mi)
- Time zone: UTC+5:30 (IST)
- PIN: 206302

Basait is a village in Kishni block of Mainpuri district, Uttar Pradesh. It is located just southeast of Kishni, with a large jhil on the north side of the main village site. Besides the main site, the village also includes about a dozen subsidiary hamlets. As of 2011, Basait had a total population of 8,837, in 1,472 households.

== Geography ==
Basait is located about 3 km southeast of the town of Kishni. There is a large jhil located immediately north of the main village site. The jhil holds water through most of the winter.

According to the 2011 census, Basait has a total area of 1,020.6 hectares, of which 715.1 were currently farmland, 187.1 were fallow lands, and 100.0 were under non-agricultural use. 4.0 hectares were occupied by orchards, 0 were occupied by permanent pastures, 11.2 were classified as cultivable but not currently under any agricultural use, and 3.0 were classified as non-cultivable. No forests existed on village lands.

== Demographics ==
As of 2011, Basait had a population of 8,837, in 1,472 households. This population was 53.3% male (4,708) and 46.7% female (4,129). The 0-6 age group numbered 1,372 (721 male and 651 female), or 15.5% of the total population. 2,147 residents were members of Scheduled Castes, or 24.3% of the total.

The 1981 census recorded Basait as having a population of 4,952 people, in 857 households.

The 1961 census recorded Basait as comprising 13 hamlets, with a total population of 3,460 people (1,875 male and 1,585 female), in 600 households and 474 physical houses. The area of the village was given as 2,567 acres and it had a post office at that point.

The 1901 census recorded Basait with a population of 2,636; included in this total were 11 subsidiary hamlets in addition to the main site (so 12 settlements in total). The village had a bank, which was run by the local zamindar, the Thakur of Saman.

== Infrastructure ==
As of 2011, Basait had 5 primary schools; it did not have any healthcare facilities. Drinking water was provided by hand pump and tube well; there were no public toilets. The village had a post office but no public library; there was at least some access to electricity for all purposes. Streets were made of both kachcha and pakka materials.
