= Legaon =

Village in Uttar Pradesh, India

- Village
- Location in Uttar Pradesh, India
- Coordinates: 26.98934°N 79.35074°E
- Country: India
- State: Uttar Pradesh
- District: Mainpuri
- Tehsil: Bhongaon

Area
  - Total: 0.952 km^{2} (0.368 sq mi)

Population (2011)
  - Total: 1,427
  - Density: 1,500/km^{2} (3,880/sq mi)
- Time zone: UTC+5:30 (IST)

Legaon (Legā̃v) is a village in Kishni block of Mainpuri district, Uttar Pradesh, India. As of 2011, it had a total population of 1,427, in 220 households.

== Demographics ==
As of 2011, Legaon had a population of 1,427, in 220 households. This population was 55.1% male (786) and 44.9% female (641). The 0-6 age group numbered 244 (148 male and 96 female), or 17.1% of the total population. 207 residents were members of Scheduled Castes, or 14.5% of the total.

The 1981 census recorded Legaon as having a population of 878 people, in 115 households.

The 1961 census recorded Legaon as comprising 1 hamlet, with a total population of 561 people (315 male and 246 female), in 105 households and 91 physical houses. The area of the village was given as 230 acres.

== Infrastructure ==
As of 2011, Legaon had 1 primary school; it did not have any healthcare facilities. Drinking water was provided by hand pump; there were no public toilets. The village had a public library but no post office; there was at least some access to electricity for all purposes. Streets were made of both kachcha and pakka materials.
