= Maholi Shamsherganj =

Village in Uttar Pradesh, India

- Village
- Location in Uttar Pradesh, India
- Coordinates: 27.0063685°N 79.2925004°E
- Country: India
- State: Uttar Pradesh
- District: Mainpuri
- Tehsil: Bhongaon

Area
  - Total: 13.463 km^{2} (5.198 sq mi)

Population (2011)
  - Total: 9,134
  - Density: 678.5/km^{2} (1,757/sq mi)
- Time zone: UTC+5:30 (IST)
- PIN: 206302

Maholi Shamsherganj (Māholī Śamśergañj, also Maholī) is a village in Kishni block of Mainpuri district, Uttar Pradesh. It is located in the southeastern corner of the district and technically consists of two distinct main settlements: Maholi and Shamsherganj. As of 2011, it had a total population of 9,134, in 1,481 households.

== Geography ==
Maholi Shamsherganj technically consists of two distinct main village sites, Maholi and Shamsherganj, along with a number of subsidiary hamlets. Both Maholi and Shamsherganj are located near large and prominent jhils, and near Maholi is a high khera, or old mound. The whole village entity is located in the southeastern corner of the district, near the town of Kishni.

According to the 2011 census, Shamsherganj has a total area of 1,346.3 hectares, of which 1,070.4 were currently farmland, 50.9 were fallow lands, and 162.0 were under non-agricultural use. 2.5 hectares were occupied by orchards, 0 were occupied by permanent pastures, 58.3 were classified as cultivable but not currently under any agricultural use, and 1.5 were classified as non-cultivable. 0.9 hectares of forest also existed on village lands.

== Demographics ==
As of 2011, Maholi Shamsherganj had a population of 9,134, in 1,481 households. This population was 53.1% male (4,853) and 46.9% female (4,281). The 0-6 age group numbered 1,507 (794 male and 713 female), or 16.5% of the total population. 1,552 residents were members of Scheduled Castes, or 17.0% of the total.

The 1981 census recorded Maholi Shamsherganj as having a population of 5,452, in 873 households.

The 1961 census recorded Maholi Shamsherganj as comprising 12 hamlets, with a total population of 3,498 people (1,936 male and 1,562 female), in 647 households and 447 physical houses. The area of the village was given as 3,363 acres and it had a post office at that point.

The 1901 census recorded Maholi Shamsherganj as consisting of 15 hamlets with a total population of 2,589.

== Economy ==
Maholi Shamsherganj hosts markets twice per week, on Tuesdays and Fridays. Grain, cloth, and vegetables are the main items bought and sold. The village has an agricultural credit society but no banks. The main staple crops grown locally are wheat and rice.

== Infrastructure ==
As of 2011, Maholi Shamsherganj had 6 primary schools and 1 maternity and child welfare centre. Drinking water was provided by hand pump and tube well; there were no public toilets. The village had a post office but no public library; there was at least some access to electricity for all purposes. Streets were made of both kachcha and pakka materials.
