= Ramnagar, Kishni =

Village in Uttar Pradesh, India

Ramnagar
- Village
- Location in Uttar Pradesh, India
- Coordinates: 27.0684°N 79.34779°E
- Country: India
- State: Uttar Pradesh
- District: Mainpuri
- Tehsil: Bhongaon

Area
  - Total: 4.976 km^{2} (1.921 sq mi)

Population (2011)
  - Total: 4,703
  - Density: 945.1/km^{2} (2,448/sq mi)
- Time zone: UTC+5:30 (IST)
- PIN: 206303

Ramnagar (Rāmnagar) is a village in Kishni block of Mainpuri district, Uttar Pradesh, India. As of 2011, it had a total population of 4,703, in 807 households.

== Demographics ==
As of 2011, Ramnagar had a population of 4,703, in 807 households. This population was 53.9% male (2,537) and 46.1% female (2,166). The 0-6 age group numbered 688 (375 male and 313 female), or 14.6% of the total population. 887 residents were members of Scheduled Castes, or 18.9% of the total.

The 1981 census recorded Ramnagar as having a population of 3,022 people, in 529 households.

The 1961 census recorded Ramnagar as comprising 10 hamlets, with a total population of 2,152 people (1,170 male and 982 female), in 429 households and 369 physical houses. The area of the village was given as 1,306 acres and it had a post office at that point.

== Infrastructure ==
As of 2011, Ramnagar had 5 primary schools and 1 primary health centre. Drinking water was provided by hand pump and tube well; there were no public toilets. The village had a post office and public library, as well as at least some access to electricity for all purposes. Streets were made of both kachcha and pakka materials.
