= Nagla Bale =

Village in Uttar Pradesh, India

- Village
- Location in Uttar Pradesh, India
- Coordinates: 26.96397°N 79.32652°E
- Country: India
- State: Uttar Pradesh
- District: Mainpuri
- Tehsil: Bhongaon

Area
  - Total: 1.565 km^{2} (0.604 sq mi)

Population (2011)
  - Total: 821
  - Density: 525/km^{2} (1,360/sq mi)
- Time zone: UTC+5:30 (IST)
- PIN: 206302

Nagla Bale (Naglā Bāle) is a village in Kishni block of Mainpuri district, Uttar Pradesh, India. As of 2011, it had a total population of 821, in 140 households.

== Demographics ==
As of 2011, Nagla Bale had a population of 821, in 140 households. This population was 55.4% male (455) and 44.6% female (366). The 0-6 age group numbered 147 (81 male and 66 female), or 17.9% of the total population. 176 residents were members of Scheduled Castes, or 21.4% of the total.

The 1981 census recorded Nagla Bale (as "Nagle Baley") as having a population of 338 people, in 37 households.

The 1961 census recorded Nagla Bale (as "Nagla Baley") as comprising 3 hamlets, with a total population of 289 people (154 male and 135 female), in 50 households and 45 physical houses. The area of the village was given as 387 acres.

== Infrastructure ==
As of 2011, Nagla Bale had 2 primary schools; it did not have any healthcare facilities. Drinking water was provided by hand pump; there were no public toilets. The village had a post office but no public library; there was at least some access to electricity for all purposes. Streets were made of pakka materials.
