= Singhpur, Kishni =

Village in Uttar Pradesh, India

Singhpur
- Village
- Location in Uttar Pradesh, India
- Coordinates: 27.02245°N 79.33053°E
- Country: India
- State: Uttar Pradesh
- District: Mainpuri
- Tehsil: Bhongaon

Area
  - Total: 2.56 km^{2} (0.99 sq mi)

Population (2011)
  - Total: 2,182
  - Density: 852/km^{2} (2,210/sq mi)
- Time zone: UTC+5:30 (IST)

Singhpur (Siṅghpur) is a village in Kishni block of Mainpuri district, Uttar Pradesh. As of 2011, it has a total population of 2,182, in 355 households.

== Demographics ==
As of 2011, Singhpur had a population of 2,182, in 355 households. This population was 54.1% male (1,180) and 45.9% female (1,002). The 0-6 age group numbered 317 (175 male and 142 female), or 14.5% of the total population. 663 residents were members of Scheduled Castes, or 30.4% of the total.

The 1981 census recorded Singhpur as having a population of 1,140 people, in 175 households.

The 1961 census recorded Singhpur as comprising 4 hamlets, with a total population of 807 people (437 male and 370 female), in 132 households and 110 physical houses. The area of the village was given as 648 acres.

== Infrastructure ==
As of 2011, Singhpur had 1 primary school; it did not have any healthcare facilities. Drinking water was provided by tap, well, and hand pump; there were public toilets. The village had a post office and public library, as well as at least some access to electricity for all purposes. Streets were made of both kachcha and pakka materials.
