= Hirauli =

Village in Uttar Pradesh, India

- Village
- Location in Uttar Pradesh, India
- Coordinates: 27.08987°N 79.31766°E
- Country: India
- State: Uttar Pradesh
- District: Mainpuri
- Tehsil: Bhongaon

Area
  - Total: 2.38 km^{2} (0.92 sq mi)

Population (2011)
  - Total: 2,205
  - Density: 926/km^{2} (2,400/sq mi)
- Time zone: UTC+5:30 (IST)
- PIN: 206303

Hirauli (Hiraulī) is a village in Kishni block of Mainpuri district, Uttar Pradesh, India. As of 2011, it had a total population of 2,205, in 341 households.

== Demographics ==
As of 2011, Hirauli had a population of 2,205, in 341 households. This population was 51.9% male (1,145) and 48.1% female (1,060). The 0–6 age group numbered 382 (199 male and 183 female), or 17.3% of the total population. 558 residents were members of Scheduled Castes, or 25.3% of the total.

The 1981 census recorded Hirauli as having a population of 1,208 people, in 215 households.

The 1961 census recorded Hirauli as comprising two hamlets, with a total population of 918 people (487 male and 431 female), in 93 households and 55 physical houses. The area of the village was given as 589 acres (238 ha).

== Infrastructure ==
As of 2011, Hirauli had one primary school; it did not have any healthcare facilities. Drinking water was provided by hand pump and tube well; there were no public toilets. The village had a post office but no public library; there was at least some access to electricity for all purposes. Streets were made of both kachcha and pakka materials.
