= Tariha =

Village in Uttar Pradesh, India

- Village
- Location in Uttar Pradesh, India
- Coordinates: 27.07078°N 79.33868°E
- Country: India
- State: Uttar Pradesh
- District: Mainpuri
- Tehsil: Bhongaon

Area
  - Total: 6.988 km^{2} (2.698 sq mi)

Population (2011)
  - Total: 3,593
  - Density: 514.2/km^{2} (1,332/sq mi)
- Time zone: UTC+5:30 (IST)
- PIN: 206303

Tariha (Tarihā) is a village in Kishni block of Mainpuri district, Uttar Pradesh. As of 2011, it had a total population of 3,593, in 625 households.

== Demographics ==
As of 2011, Tariha had a population of 3,593, in 625 households. This population was 54.6% male (1,961) and 45.4% female (1,632). The 0-6 age group numbered 522 (304 male and 218 female), or 14.5% of the total population. 811 residents were members of Scheduled Castes, or 22.6% of the total.

The 1981 census recorded Tariha as having a population of 2,669 people, in 481 households.

The 1961 census recorded Tariha as comprising 17 hamlets, with a total population of 1,894 people (1,034 male and 860 female), in 375 households and 299 physical houses. The area of the village was given as 1,752 acres.

== Infrastructure ==
As of 2011, Tariha had 1 primary school; it did not have any healthcare facilities. Drinking water was provided by tap, hand pump, and tube well; there were no public toilets. The village had a post office and public library, as well as at least some access to electricity for all purposes. Streets were made of both kachcha and pakka materials.
