= Kaithpur =

Village in Uttar Pradesh, India

- Village
- Location in Uttar Pradesh, India
- Coordinates: 26.9765°N 79.33682°E
- Country: India
- State: Uttar Pradesh
- District: Mainpuri
- Tehsil: Bhongaon

Area
  - Total: 1.848 km^{2} (0.714 sq mi)

Population (2011)
  - Total: 1,630
  - Density: 882/km^{2} (2,280/sq mi)
- Time zone: UTC+5:30 (IST)
- PIN: 206302

Kaithpur ( Kaithpur) is a village in Kishni block of Mainpuri district, Uttar Pradesh, India. As of 2011, it had a total population of 1,630, in 278 households.

== Demographics ==
As of 2011, Kaithpur had a population of 1,630, in 278 households. This population was 54.4% male (887) and 45.6% female (743). The 0-6 age group numbered 278 (151 male and 127 female), or 17.1% of the total population. 421 residents were members of Scheduled Castes, or 25.8% of the total.

The 1981 census recorded Kaithpur as having a population of 1,017 people, in 190 households.

The 1961 census recorded Kaithpur as comprising 2 hamlets, with a total population of 702 people (388 male and 314 female), in 139 households and 97 physical houses. The area of the village was given as 469 acres.

== Infrastructure ==
As of 2011, Kaithpur had 1 primary school; it did not have any healthcare facilities. Drinking water was provided by hand pump; there were no public toilets. The village did not have a post office or public library; there was at least some access to electricity for all purposes. Streets were made of both kachcha and pakka materials.
