= Ichhaipur =

Village in Uttar Pradesh, India

- Village
- Location in Uttar Pradesh, India
- Coordinates: 27.15943°N 79.27062°E
- Country: India
- State: Uttar Pradesh
- District: Mainpuri
- Tehsil: Bhongaon

Area
  - Total: 1.227 km^{2} (0.474 sq mi)

Population (2011)
  - Total: 605
  - Density: 493/km^{2} (1,280/sq mi)
- Time zone: UTC+5:30 (IST)

Ichhaipur (Ichhaipur or Īchhaīpur) is a village in Kishni block of Mainpuri district, Uttar Pradesh, India. As of 2011, it had a total population of 605, in 109 households.

== Demographics ==
As of 2011, Ichhaipur had a population of 605, in 109 households. This population was 53.6% male (324) and 46.4% female (281). The 0-6 age group numbered 71 (36 male and 35 female), or 11.7% of the total population. 40 residents were members of Scheduled Castes, or 6.6% of the total.

The 1981 census recorded Ichhaipur as having a population of 503 people, in 81 households.

The 1961 census recorded Ichhaipur as comprising 3 hamlets, with a total population of 395 people (224 male and 171 female), in 75 households and 44 physical houses. The area of the village was given as 295 acres.

== Infrastructure ==
As of 2011, Ichhaipur had 1 primary school; it did not have any healthcare facilities. Drinking water was provided by hand pump and tube well; there were no public toilets. The village had a post office but no public library; there was at least some access to electricity for all purposes. Streets were made of both kachcha and pakka materials.
