= Kumhaul =

Village in Uttar Pradesh, India

- Village
- Location in Uttar Pradesh, India
- Coordinates: 27.01954°N 79.37007°E
- Country: India
- State: Uttar Pradesh
- District: Mainpuri
- Tehsil: Bhongaon

Area
  - Total: 10.024 km^{2} (3.870 sq mi)

Population (2011)
  - Total: 6,036
  - Density: 602.2/km^{2} (1,560/sq mi)
- Time zone: UTC+5:30 (IST)
- PIN: 206303

Kumhaul is a village in Kishni block of Mainpuri district, Uttar Pradesh. Located on the north bank of the Arind river, it hosts markets twice per week. As of 2011, it had a total population of 6,036, in 984 households.

== Geography ==
Kumhaul is located on the left (north) bank of the Arind river, about 11 km east of the town of Kishni.

According to the 2011 census, Kumhaul has a total area of 1,002.4 hectares, of which 585.8 were currently farmland, 326.3 were fallow lands, and 56.7 were under non-agricultural use. 10.2 hectares were occupied by orchards, 11.3 were occupied by permanent pastures, 11.1 were classified as cultivable but not currently under any agricultural use, and 1.0 were classified as non-cultivable. No forests existed on village lands.

== Demographics ==
As of 2011, Kumhaul had a population of 6,036, in 984 households. This population was 53.9% male (3,256) and 46.1% female (2,780). The 0-6 age group numbered 925 (493 male and 432 female), or 15.3% of the total population. 1,810 residents were members of Scheduled Castes, or 30.0% of the total.

The 1981 census recorded Kumhaul (as "Kumhal") as having a population of 3,710 people, in 630 households.

The 1961 census recorded Kumhaul (as "Kumhal") as comprising 12 hamlets, with a total population of 2,761 people (1,501 male and 1,260 female), in 503 households and 415 physical houses. The area of the village was given as 2,522 acres.

The 1901 census recorded Kumhaul with a population of 2,369; included in this total were 14 subsidiary hamlets in addition to the main site (so 15 settlements in total).

== Economy ==
Kumhaul hosts markets twice per week. There are no banks or agricultural credit societies in the village. Shri Sheshnaag Baba Mandir situated here . Most popular temple in this block .

== Infrastructure ==
As of 2011, Kumhaul had 4 primary schools; it did not have any healthcare facilities. Drinking water was provided by hand pump; there were no public toilets. The village had a post office and public library, as well as at least some access to electricity for all purposes. Streets were made of both kachcha and pakka materials.
