= Paharpur, Kishni =

Village in Uttar Pradesh, India

Paharpur
- Village
- Location in Uttar Pradesh, India
- Coordinates: 27.15637°N 79.22334°E
- Country: India
- State: Uttar Pradesh
- District: Mainpuri
- Tehsil: Bhongaon

Area
  - Total: 4.881 km^{2} (1.885 sq mi)

Population (2011)
  - Total: 2,689
  - Density: 550.9/km^{2} (1,427/sq mi)
- Time zone: UTC+5:30 (IST)
- PIN: 206303

Paharpur (Pahāṛpur) is a village in Kishni block of Mainpuri district, Uttar Pradesh. As of 2011, it had a total population of 2,689, in 418 households.

== Demographics ==
As of 2011, Paharpur had a population of 2,689, in 418 households. This population was 52.0% male (1,398) and 48.0% female (1,291). The 0-6 age group numbered 545 (272 male and 273 female), or 20.3% of the total population. 829 residents were members of Scheduled Castes, or 30.1% of the total.

The 1981 census recorded Paharpur as having a population of 1,437 people, in 268 households.

The 1961 census recorded Paharpur as comprising 5 hamlets, with a total population of 998 people (530 male and 468 female), in 180 households and 155 physical houses. The area of the village was given as 1,225 acres.

== Infrastructure ==
As of 2011, Paharpur had 1 primary school; it did not have any healthcare facilities. Drinking water was provided by hand pump and tube well; there were no public toilets. The village had a post office but no public library; there was at least some access to electricity for all purposes. Streets were made of both kachcha and pakka materials.
