= Sakra, Mainpuri =

Village in Uttar Pradesh, India

Sakra
- Village
- Location in Uttar Pradesh, India
- Coordinates: 27.12072°N 79.24106°E
- Country: India
- State: Uttar Pradesh
- District: Mainpuri
- Tehsil: Bhongaon

Area
  - Total: 9.573 km^{2} (3.696 sq mi)

Population (2011)
  - Total: 5,751
  - Density: 600.8/km^{2} (1,556/sq mi)
- Time zone: UTC+5:30 (IST)

Sakra (Sakrā) is a village in Kishni block of Mainpuri district, Uttar Pradesh, India. As of 2011, it had a total population of 5,751, in 962 households.

== Demographics ==
As of 2011, Sakra had a population of 5,751, in 962 households. This population was 53.3% male (3,063) and 46.7% female (2,688). The 0-6 age group numbered 864 (444 male and 420 female), or 15.0% of the total population. 889 residents were members of Scheduled Castes, or 15.5% of the total.

The 1981 census recorded Sakra as having a population of 3,521 people, in 623 households.

The 1961 census recorded Sakra as comprising 16 hamlets, with a total population of 2,637 people (1,440 male and 1,197 female), in 466 households and 255 physical houses. The area of the village was given as 2,412 acres and it had a post office at that point.

== Infrastructure ==
As of 2011, Sakra had 2 primary schools; it did not have any healthcare facilities. Drinking water was provided by hand pump and tube well; there were no public toilets. The village had a post office and public library, as well as at least some access to electricity for residential and agricultural purposes. Streets were made of both kachcha and pakka materials.
