= Kursanda =

Village in Uttar Pradesh, India

- Village
- Location in Uttar Pradesh, India
- Coordinates: 26.98821°N 79.31676°E
- Country: India
- State: Uttar Pradesh
- District: Mainpuri
- Tehsil: Bhongaon

Area
  - Total: 2.859 km^{2} (1.104 sq mi)

Population (2011)
  - Total: 1,803
  - Density: 630.6/km^{2} (1,633/sq mi)
- Time zone: UTC+5:30 (IST)

Kursanda is a village in Kishni block of Mainpuri district, Uttar Pradesh. As of 2011, it has a total population of 1,803, in 295 households.

== Demographics ==
As of 2011, Kursanda had a population of 1,803, in 295 households. This population was 53.1% male (957) and 46.9% female (846). The 0-6 age group numbered 248 (133 male and 115 female), or 13.8% of the total population. 274 residents were members of Scheduled Castes, or 15.2% of the total.

The 1981 census recorded Kursanda as having a population of 1,028 people, in 155 households.

The 1961 census recorded Kursanda as comprising 2 hamlets, with a total population of 671 people (368 male and 303 female), in 132 households and 95 physical houses. The area of the village was given as 720 acres.

== Infrastructure ==
As of 2011, Kursanda had 1 primary school; it did not have any healthcare facilities. Drinking water was provided by hand pump; there were no public toilets. The village had a public library but no post office; there was at least some access to electricity for all purposes. Streets were made of both kachcha and pakka materials.
