= Saunasi =

Village in Uttar Pradesh, India

- Village
- Location in Uttar Pradesh, India
- Coordinates: 27.05787°N 79.28139°E
- Country: India
- State: Uttar Pradesh
- District: Mainpuri
- Tehsil: Bhongaon

Area
  - Total: 11.598 km^{2} (4.478 sq mi)

Population (2011)
  - Total: 4,135
  - Density: 356.5/km^{2} (923.4/sq mi)
- Time zone: UTC+5:30 (IST)

Saunasi (Saunāsī) is a village in Kishni block of Mainpuri district, Uttar Pradesh, India. As of 2011, it had a total population of 4,135, in 707 households.

== Demographics ==
As of 2011, Saunasi had a population of 4,135, in 707 households. This population was 54.2% male (2,240) and 45.8% female (1,895). The 0-6 age group numbered 682 (359 male and 323 female), or 16.5% of the total population. 788 residents were members of Scheduled Castes, or 19.1% of the total.

The 1981 census recorded Saunasi as having a population of 2,557 people, in 343 households.

The 1961 census recorded Saunasi as comprising 9 hamlets, with a total population of 1,562 people (837 male and 725 female), in 266 households and 231 physical houses. The area of the village was given as 2,885 acres.

== Infrastructure ==
As of 2011, Saunasi had 2 primary schools; it did not have any healthcare facilities. Drinking water was provided by hand pump; there were no public toilets. The village had a post office but no public library; there was at least some access to electricity for all purposes. Streets were made of both kachcha and pakka materials.
