= Husainpur, Kishni =

Village in Uttar Pradesh, India

Husainpur
- Village
- Location in Uttar Pradesh, India
- Coordinates: 27.09442°N 79.28882°E
- Country: India
- State: Uttar Pradesh
- District: Mainpuri
- Tehsil: Bhongaon

Area
  - Total: 3.512 km^{2} (1.356 sq mi)

Population (2011)
  - Total: 1,812
  - Density: 515.9/km^{2} (1,336/sq mi)
- Time zone: UTC+5:30 (IST)

Husainpur is a village in Kishni block of Mainpuri district, Uttar Pradesh. As of 2011, it had a total population of 1,812, in 333 households.

== Demographics ==
As of 2011, Husainpur had a population of 1,812, in 333 households. This population was 51.5% male (933) and 48.5% female (879). The 0-6 age group numbered 325 (169 male and 156 female), or 17.9% of the total population. 828 residents were members of Scheduled Castes, or 45.7% of the total.

The 1981 census recorded Husainpur as having a population of 825 people, in 125 households.

The 1961 census recorded Husainpur as comprising 4 hamlets, with a total population of 551 people (305 male and 246 female), in 91 households and 66 physical houses. The area of the village was given as 907 acres.

== Infrastructure ==
As of 2011, Husainpur had 1 primary school; it did not have any healthcare facilities. Drinking water was provided by well, hand pump, and tube well; there were no public toilets. The village had a post office and public library, as well as at least some access to electricity for all purposes. Streets were made of both kachcha and pakka materials.
