= Nagla Birtia =

Village in Uttar Pradesh, India

- Village
- Location in Uttar Pradesh, India
- Coordinates: 26.96914°N 79.34209°E
- Country: India
- State: Uttar Pradesh
- District: Mainpuri
- Tehsil: Bhongaon

Area
  - Total: 0.667 km^{2} (0.258 sq mi)

Population (2011)
  - Total: 264
  - Density: 396/km^{2} (1,030/sq mi)
- Time zone: UTC+5:30 (IST)
- PIN: 206302

Nagla Birtia (Naglā Birtiyā) is a village in Kishni block of Mainpuri district, Uttar Pradesh, India. As of 2011, it had a total population of 264, in 41 households.

== Demographics ==
As of 2011, Nagla Birtia had a population of 264, in 41 households. This population was 52.3% male (138) and 47.7% female (126). The 0-6 age group numbered 28 (10 male and 18 female), or 10.6% of the total population. No residents were members of Scheduled Castes.

The 1981 census recorded Nagla Birtia as having a population of 151 people, in 17 households.

The 1961 census recorded Nagla Birtia as comprising 1 hamlet, with a total population of 92 people (45 male and 47 female), in 13 households and 10 physical houses. The area of the village was given as 165 acres.

== Infrastructure ==
As of 2011, Nagla Birtia did not have any schools or healthcare facilities. Drinking water was provided by hand pump; there were no public toilets. The village had a post office but no public library; there was at least some access to electricity for commercial and agricultural purposes. Streets were made of both kachcha and pakka materials.
