= Diwanpur Sahini =

Village in Uttar Pradesh, India

- Village
- Location in Uttar Pradesh, India
- Coordinates: 27.01462°N 79.31472°E
- Country: India
- State: Uttar Pradesh
- District: Mainpuri
- Tehsil: Bhongaon

Area
  - Total: 1.95 km^{2} (0.75 sq mi)

Population (2011)
  - Total: 1,249
  - Density: 641/km^{2} (1,660/sq mi)
- Time zone: UTC+5:30 (IST)

Diwanpur Sahini, also spelled Divanpur Sahini (Dīvānpur Sāhinī), is a village in Kishni block of Mainpuri district, Uttar Pradesh, India. As of 2011, it had a total population of 1,249, in 189 households.

== Demographics ==
As of 2011, Diwanpur Sahini had a population of 1,249, in 189 households. This population was 53.1% male (683) and 46.9% female (586). The 0-6 age group numbered 216 (107 male and 109 female), or 17.3% of the total population. 325 residents were members of Scheduled Castes, or 26.0% of the total.

The 1981 census recorded Diwanpur Sahini as having a population of 592 people, in 110 households.

The 1961 census recorded Diwanpur Sahini as comprising 2 hamlets, with a total population of 416 people (220 male and 196 female), in 74 households and 55 physical houses. The area of the village was given as 321 acres.

== Infrastructure ==
As of 2011, Diwanpur Sahini had 1 primary school; it did not have any healthcare facilities. Drinking water was provided by hand pump; there were no public toilets. The village had a post office and public library, as well as at least some access to electricity for all purposes. Streets were made of kachcha materials.
