= Mahgawan, Mainpuri =

Village in Uttar Pradesh, India

Mahgawan
- Village
- Location in Uttar Pradesh, India
- Coordinates: 27.08127°N 79.20643°E
- Country: India
- State: Uttar Pradesh
- District: Mainpuri
- Tehsil: Bhongaon

Area
  - Total: 10.032 km^{2} (3.873 sq mi)

Population (2011)
  - Total: 3,857
  - Density: 384.5/km^{2} (995.8/sq mi)
- Time zone: UTC+5:30 (IST)

Mahgawan (Mahgawān) or Mahgãwān), is a village in Kishni block of Mainpuri district, Uttar Pradesh. As of 2011, it had a total population of 3,857, in 667 households.

== Demographics ==
As of 2011, Mahgawan had a population of 3,857, in 667 households. This population was 52.3% male (2,016) and 47.7% female (1,841). The 0-6 age group numbered 583 (295 male and 288 female), or 15.1% of the total population. 833 residents were members of Scheduled Castes, or 21.6% of the total.

The 1981 census recorded Mahgawan as having a population of 2,277 people, in 362 households.

The 1961 census recorded Mahgawan as comprising 12 hamlets, with a total population of 1,684 people (903 male and 781 female), in 294 households and 236 physical houses. The area of the village was given as 2,530 acres.

== Infrastructure ==
As of 2011, Mahgawan had 2 primary schools; it did not have any healthcare facilities. Drinking water was provided by tap, well, hand pump, and tube well; there were no public toilets. The village had a post office and public library, as well as at least some access to electricity for residential and agricultural purposes. Streets were made of both kachcha and pakka materials.
