= Arsara =

Village in Uttar Pradesh, India

- Village
- Location in Uttar Pradesh, India
- Coordinates: 27.0669°N 79.26917°E
- Country: India
- State: Uttar Pradesh
- District: Mainpuri
- Tehsil: Bhongaon

Area
  - Total: 5.288 km^{2} (2.042 sq mi)

Population (2011)
  - Total: 3,585
  - Density: 678.0/km^{2} (1,756/sq mi)
- Time zone: UTC+5:30 (IST)
- PIN: 206303

Arsara (Arsārā) is a village in Kishni block of Mainpuri district, Uttar Pradesh. As of 2011, it has a total population of 3,585, in 576 households.

== Demographics ==
As of 2011, Arsara had a population of 3,585, in 576 households. This population was 53.4% male (1,914) and 46.6% female (1,671). The 0-6 age group numbered 521 (244 male and 277 female), or 14.5% of the total population. 875 residents were members of Scheduled Castes, or 24.4% of the total.

The 1981 census recorded Arsara as having a population of 2,064 people, in 336 households.

The 1961 census recorded Arsara as comprising 10 hamlets, with a total population of 1,408 people (770 male and 638 female), in 263 households and 212 physical houses. The area of the village was given as 1,313 acres and it had a post office at that point.

== Infrastructure ==
As of 2011, Arsara had 2 primary schools; it did not have any healthcare facilities. Drinking water was provided by hand pump and tube well; there were no public toilets. The village had a post office and public library, as well as at least some access to electricity for all purposes. Streets were made of both kachcha and pakka materials.
