= Gulariapur =

Village in Uttar Pradesh, India

- Village
- Location in Uttar Pradesh, India
- Coordinates: 27.06153°N 79.36386°E
- Country: India
- State: Uttar Pradesh
- District: Mainpuri
- Tehsil: Bhongaon

Area
  - Total: 3.073 km^{2} (1.186 sq mi)

Population (2011)
  - Total: 2,492
  - Density: 810.9/km^{2} (2,100/sq mi)
- Time zone: UTC+5:30 (IST)
- PIN: 206303

Gulariapur (Gulariyāpur) is a village in Kishni block of Mainpuri district, Uttar Pradesh, India. As of 2011, it had a total population of 2,492, in 407 households.

== Demographics ==
As of 2011, Gulariapur had a population of 2,492, in 407 households. This population was 55.0% male (1,371) and 45.0% female (1,121). The 0-6 age group numbered 420 (234 male and 186 female), or 16.9% of the total population. 976 residents were members of Scheduled Castes, or 39.2% of the total.

The 1981 census recorded Gulariapur as having a population of 1,316 people, in 233 households.

The 1961 census recorded Gulariapur as comprising 4 hamlets, with a total population of 913 people (498 male and 415 female), in 197 households and 155 physical houses. The area of the village was given as 759 acres.

== Infrastructure ==
As of 2011, Gulariapur had 1 primary school; it did not have any healthcare facilities. Drinking water was provided by hand pump and tube well; there were no public toilets. The village had a post office but no public library; there was at least some access to electricity for residential and agricultural purposes. Streets were made of kachcha materials.
