= Rangpur, Mainpuri =

Village in Uttar Pradesh, India

Rangpur
- Village
- Location in Uttar Pradesh, India
- Coordinates: 27.07376°N 79.41565°E
- Country: India
- State: Uttar Pradesh
- District: Mainpuri
- Tehsil: Bhongaon

Area
  - Total: 3.12 km^{2} (1.20 sq mi)

Population (2011)
  - Total: 1,034
  - Density: 331/km^{2} (858/sq mi)
- Time zone: UTC+5:30 (IST)
- PIN: 209720

Rangpur (Raṅgpur) is a village in Kishni block of Mainpuri district, Uttar Pradesh. As of 2011, it has a total population of 1,034, in 175 households.

== Demographics ==
As of 2011, Rangpur had a population of 1,034, in 175 households. This population was 54.5% male (564) and 45.5% female (470). The 0-6 age group numbered 154 (78 male and 76 female), or 14.9% of the total population. 355 residents were members of Scheduled Castes, or 34.3% of the total.

The 1981 census recorded Rangpur as having a population of 777 people, in 150 households.

The 1961 census recorded Rangpur as comprising 2 hamlets, with a total population of 534 people (281 male and 253 female), in 105 households and 83 physical houses. The area of the village was given as 534 acres.

== Infrastructure ==
As of 2011, Rangpur had 1 primary school; it did not have any healthcare facilities. Drinking water was provided by hand pump and tube well; there were no public toilets. The village had a post office but no public library; there was at least some access to electricity for all purposes. Streets were made of pakka materials.
