= Arjunpur, Mainpuri =

Village in Uttar Pradesh, India

Arjunpur
- Village
- Location in Uttar Pradesh, India
- Coordinates: 27.09144°N 79.40905°E
- Country: India
- State: Uttar Pradesh
- District: Mainpuri
- Tehsil: Bhongaon

Area
  - Total: 1.86 km^{2} (0.72 sq mi)

Population (2011)
  - Total: 2,334
  - Density: 1,250/km^{2} (3,250/sq mi)
- Time zone: UTC+5:30 (IST)
- PIN: 209720

Arjunpur is a village in Kishni block of Mainpuri district in Uttar Pradesh, India.

== Demographics ==
In 2011, Arjunpur had a population of 2,334 in 394 households. This population was 53.4% male (1,246) and 46.6% female (1,088). The 0-6 age group numbered 449 (240 male and 209 female), or 19.2% of the total population. 1,157 residents were members of Scheduled Castes, or 49.6% of the total.

The 1981 census recorded Arjunpur as having a population of 958 in 173 households.

The 1961 census recorded Arjunpur as comprising four hamlets, with a total population of 844 (484 male and 360 female) in 154 households and 125 physical houses. The area of the village was given as 458 acres (185 ha).

== Infrastructure ==
In 2011, Arjunpur had one primary school. It did not have any healthcare facilities. Drinking water was provided by hand pump and there were no public toilets. The village had a post office and public library, as well as at least some access to electricity for all purposes. Streets were made of kachcha materials.
