= Sathigawan =

Village in Uttar Pradesh, India

- Village
- Location in Uttar Pradesh, India
- Coordinates: 27.03935°N 79.35746°E
- Country: India
- State: Uttar Pradesh
- District: Mainpuri
- Tehsil: Bhongaon

Area
  - Total: 4.973 km^{2} (1.920 sq mi)

Population (2011)
  - Total: 2,468
  - Density: 496.3/km^{2} (1,285/sq mi)
- Time zone: UTC+5:30 (IST)
- PIN: 206303

Sathigawan is a village in Kishni block of Mainpuri district, Uttar Pradesh. As of 2011, it has a total population of 2,468, in 379 households.

== Demographics ==
As of 2011, Sathigawan had a population of 2,468, in 379 households. This population was 54.1% male (1,335) and 45.9% female (1,133). The 0-6 age group numbered 380 (182 male and 198 female), or 15.4% of the total population. 299 residents were members of Scheduled Castes, or 12.1% of the total.

The 1981 census recorded Sathigawan as having a population of 1,648 people, in 281 households.

The 1961 census recorded Sathigawan as comprising 7 hamlets, with a total population of 1,132 people (623 male and 509 female), in 202 households and 170 physical houses. The area of the village was given as 1,275 acres.

== Infrastructure ==
As of 2011, Sathigawan had 1 primary school; it did not have any healthcare facilities. Drinking water was provided by hand pump and tube well; there were no public toilets. The village had a post office and public library, as well as at least some access to electricity for all purposes. Streets were made of both kachcha and pakka materials.
