= Pharenji =

Village in Uttar Pradesh, India

- Village
- Location in Uttar Pradesh, India
- Coordinates: 26.99804°N 79.23168°E
- Country: India
- State: Uttar Pradesh
- District: Mainpuri
- Tehsil: Bhongaon

Area
  - Total: 11.129 km^{2} (4.297 sq mi)

Population (2011)
  - Total: 6,105
  - Density: 548.6/km^{2} (1,421/sq mi)
- Time zone: UTC+5:30 (IST)
- PIN: 226302

Pharenji (Phareñjī) is a village in Kishni block of Mainpuri district, Uttar Pradesh. As of 2011, it has a total population of 6,105, in 1,066 households.

== Geography ==
There is a relatively large jhil at Pharenji.

== Demographics ==
As of 2011, Pharenji had a population of 6,105, in 1,066 households. This population was 52.6% male (3,211) and 47.4% female (2,894). The 0-6 age group numbered 819 (432 male and 387 female), or 13.4% of the total population. 1,452 residents were members of Scheduled Castes, or 23.8% of the total.

The 1981 census recorded Pharenji as having a population of 4,412 people, in 738 households.

The 1961 census recorded Pharenji as comprising 10 hamlets, with a total population of 2,977 people (1,669 male and 1,308 female), in 546 households and 419 physical houses. The area of the village was given as 2,769 acres and it had a post office at that point.

== Infrastructure ==
As of 2011, Pharenji had 3 primary schools and 1 maternity and child welfare centre. Drinking water was provided by well and hand pump; there were public toilets. The village had a post office but no public library; there was at least some access to electricity for all purposes. Streets were made of both kachcha and pakka materials.
