= Nagla Maholi =

Village in Uttar Pradesh, India

- Village
- Location in Uttar Pradesh, India
- Coordinates: 26.96241°N 79.35178°E
- Country: India
- State: Uttar Pradesh
- District: Mainpuri
- Tehsil: Bhongaon

Area
  - Total: 0.473 km^{2} (0.183 sq mi)

Population (2011)
  - Total: 551
  - Density: 1,160/km^{2} (3,020/sq mi)
- Time zone: UTC+5:30 (IST)
- PIN: 206302

Nagla Maholi (Naglā Maholī) is a village in Kishni block of Mainpuri district, Uttar Pradesh, India. As of 2011, it had a total population of 551, in 96 households.

== Demographics ==
As of 2011, Nagla Maholi had a population of 551, in 96 households. This population was 53.0% male (292) and 47.0% female (259). The 0-6 age group numbered 76 (36 male and 40 female), or 13.8% of the total population. 182 residents were members of Scheduled Castes, or 33.0% of the total.

The 1981 census recorded Nagla Maholi as having a population of 285 people, in 44 households.

The 1961 census recorded Nagla Maholi as comprising 1 hamlet, with a total population of 196 people (102 male and 94 female), in 36 households and 36 physical houses. The area of the village was given as 117 acres.

== Infrastructure ==
As of 2011, Nagla Maholi did not have any schools or healthcare facilities. Drinking water was provided by hand pump and tube well; there were no public toilets. The village did not have a post office or public library; there was at least some access to electricity for all purposes. Streets were made of both kachcha and pakka materials.
