= Khwajapur, Mainpuri =

Village in Uttar Pradesh, India

Khwajapur
- Village
- Location in Uttar Pradesh, India
- Coordinates: 27.08288°N 79.33965°E
- Country: India
- State: Uttar Pradesh
- District: Mainpuri
- Tehsil: Bhongaon

Area
  - Total: 1.236 km^{2} (0.477 sq mi)

Population (2011)
  - Total: 686
  - Density: 555/km^{2} (1,440/sq mi)
- Time zone: UTC+5:30 (IST)
- PIN: 206303

Khwajapur (Khwājāpur) is a village in Kishni block of Mainpuri district, Uttar Pradesh. As of 2011, it has a total population of 686, in 122 households.

== Demographics ==
As of 2011, Khwajapur had a population of 686, in 122 households. This population was 51.2% male (351) and 48.8% female (335). The 0-6 age group numbered 93 (50 male and 43 female), or 13.6% of the total population. 160 residents were members of Scheduled Castes, or 23.3% of the total.

The 1981 census recorded Khwajapur as having a population of 386 people, in 69 households.

The 1961 census recorded Khwajapur as comprising 1 hamlet, with a total population of 287 people (152 male and 135 female), in 46 households and 39 physical houses. The area of the village was given as 310 acres.

== Infrastructure ==
As of 2011, Khwajapur had 1 primary school; it did not have any healthcare facilities. Drinking water was provided by hand pump and tube well; there were no public toilets. The village had a post office but no public library; there was at least some access to electricity for all purposes. Streets were made of kachcha materials.
