= Isapur Dikhatmai =

Village in Uttar Pradesh, India

- Village
- Location in Uttar Pradesh, India
- Coordinates: 27.11923°N 79.27263°E
- Country: India
- State: Uttar Pradesh
- District: Mainpuri
- Tehsil: Bhongaon

Area
  - Total: 0.18 km^{2} (0.069 sq mi)

Population (2011)
  - Total: 32
  - Density: 180/km^{2} (460/sq mi)
- Time zone: UTC+5:30 (IST)

Isapur Dikhatmai (Īsāpur Dikhatmāī) is a village in Kishni block of Mainpuri district, Uttar Pradesh, India. As of 2011, it had a total population of 32, in 5 households.

== Demographics ==
As of 2011, Isapur Dikhatmai had a population of 32, in 5 households. This population was 41.6% male (13) and 59.4% female (19). The 0-6 age group numbered 2 (0 male and 2 female), or 6.25% of the total population. No residents were members of Scheduled Castes.

The 1981 census recorded Isapur Dikhatmai as having a population of 18 people, in 3 households.

The 1961 census recorded Isapur Dikhatmai as comprising 1 hamlet, with a total population of 27 people (12 male and 15 female), in 3 households and 2 physical houses. The area of the village was given as 102 acres.

== Infrastructure ==
As of 2011, Isapur Dikhatmai did not have any schools or healthcare facilities. Drinking water was provided by hand pump and tube well; there were no public toilets. The village did not have a post office or public library; there was at least some access to electricity for all purposes. Streets were made of both kachcha and pakka materials.
