= Bariha =

Village in Uttar Pradesh, India

- Village
- Location in Uttar Pradesh, India
- Coordinates: 27.08008°N 79.34846°E
- Country: India
- State: Uttar Pradesh
- District: Mainpuri
- Tehsil: Bhongaon

Area
  - Total: 0.502 km^{2} (0.194 sq mi)

Population (2011)
  - Total: 587
  - Density: 1,170/km^{2} (3,030/sq mi)
- Time zone: UTC+5:30 (IST)
- PIN: 206303

Bariha (Barihā) is a village in Kishni block of Mainpuri district, Uttar Pradesh. As of 2011, it had a total population of 587, in 108 households.

== Demographics ==
As of 2011, Bariha had a population of 587, in 108 households. This population was 54.9% male (322) and 45.1% female (265). The 0-6 age group numbered 81 (52 male and 29 female), or 13.8% of the total population. 21 residents were members of Scheduled Castes, or 3.6% of the total.

The 1981 census recorded Bariha as having a population of 879 people, in 100 households.

The 1961 census recorded Bariha as comprising 1 hamlet, with a total population of 353 people (184 male and 169 female), in 74 households and 39 physical houses. The area of the village was given as 130 acres.

== Infrastructure ==
As of 2011, Bariha had 1 primary school; it did not have any healthcare facilities. Drinking water was provided by hand pump and tube well; there were no public toilets. The village did not have a post office or public library; there was at least some access to electricity for all purposes. Streets were made of both kachcha and pakka materials.
