= Chitain =

Village in Uttar Pradesh, India

- Village
- Location in Uttar Pradesh, India
- Coordinates: 27.06474°N 79.1733°E
- Country: India
- State: Uttar Pradesh
- District: Mainpuri
- Tehsil: Bhongaon

Area
  - Total: 12.473 km^{2} (4.816 sq mi)

Population (2011)
  - Total: 6,397
  - Density: 512.9/km^{2} (1,328/sq mi)
- Time zone: UTC+5:30 (IST)
- PIN: 206302

Chitain (Chitāyan) is a village in Kishni block of Mainpuri district, Uttar Pradesh. As of 2011, it has a total population of 6,397, in 1,076 households.

== Geography ==
Chitain is located about 3 km northwest of Saman on the road to Mainpuri. There are two jhils, one to the north of the village and one to the south. There is also a tank to the north of the village.

== Demographics ==
As of 2011, Chitain had a population of 6,397, in 1,076 households. This population was 53.5% male (3,420) and 46.5% female (2,977). The 0-6 age group numbered 1,149 (623 male and 526 female), or 18.0% of the total population. 1,767 residents were members of Scheduled Castes, or 27.6% of the total.

The 1981 census recorded Chitain as having a population of 3,956 people, in 1,052 households.

The 1961 census recorded Chitain as comprising 11 hamlets, with a total population of 2,654 people (1,470 male and 1,184 female), in 498 households and 341 physical houses. The area of the village was given as 3,133 acres and it had a post office at that point.

The 1901 census recorded Chitain with a population of 2,170; it had 9 subsidiary hamlets.

== Infrastructure ==
As of 2011, Chitain had 2 primary schools and 1 veterinary hospital but no healthcare facilities for humans. Drinking water was provided by tap, well, and hand pump; there were no public toilets. The village had a post office and public library, as well as at least some access to electricity for all purposes. Streets were made of both kachcha and pakka materials.
