= Nagla Jakha =

Village in Uttar Pradesh, India

- Village
- Location in Uttar Pradesh, India
- Coordinates: 26.9836°N 79.34832°E
- Country: India
- State: Uttar Pradesh
- District: Mainpuri
- Tehsil: Bhongaon

Area
  - Total: 0.562 km^{2} (0.217 sq mi)

Population (2011)
  - Total: 1,001
  - Density: 1,780/km^{2} (4,610/sq mi)
- Time zone: UTC+5:30 (IST)

Nagla Jakha (Naglā Jakhā) is a village in Kishni block of Mainpuri district, Uttar Pradesh, India. As of 2011, it had a total population of 1,001, in 141 households.

== Demographics ==
As of 2011, Nagla Jakha had a population of 1,001, in 141 households. This population was 58.2% male (583) and 41.8% female (418). The 0-6 age group numbered 130 (81 male and 49 female), or 13.0% of the total population. No residents were members of Scheduled Castes.

The 1981 census recorded Nagla Jakha as having a population of 570 people, in 88 households.

The 1961 census recorded Nagla Jakha as comprising 1 hamlet, with a total population of 312 people (178 male and 134 female), in 63 households and 49 physical houses. The area of the village was given as 138 acres.

== Infrastructure ==
As of 2011, Nagla Jakha had 2 primary schools; it did not have any healthcare facilities. Drinking water was provided by hand pump; there were no public toilets. The village had a post office and public library, as well as at least some access to electricity for all purposes. Streets were made of kachcha materials.
