= Kaithauli =

Village in Uttar Pradesh, India

- Village
- Location in Uttar Pradesh, India
- Coordinates: 27.08263°N 79.41906°E
- Country: India
- State: Uttar Pradesh
- District: Mainpuri
- Tehsil: Bhongaon

Area
  - Total: 2.201 km^{2} (0.850 sq mi)

Population (2011)
  - Total: 2,797
  - Density: 1,271/km^{2} (3,291/sq mi)
- Time zone: UTC+5:30 (IST)
- PIN: 209720

Kaithauli (Kaithaulī) is a village in Kishni block of Mainpuri district, Uttar Pradesh, India. As of 2011, it had a total population of 2,797, in 437 households.

== Demographics ==
As of 2011, Kaithauli had a population of 2,797, in 437 households. This population was 51.2% male (1,432) and 48.8% female (1,365). The 0-6 age group numbered 357 (206 male and 151 female), or 12.8% of the total population. 445 residents were members of Scheduled Castes, or 15.9% of the total.

The 1981 census recorded Kaithauli as having a population of 1,879 people, in 317 households.

The 1961 census recorded Kaithauli as comprising 3 hamlets, with a total population of 1,327 people (697 male and 630 female), in 244 households and 173 physical houses. The area of the village was given as 526 acres.

== Infrastructure ==
As of 2011, Kaithauli had 1 primary school; it did not have any healthcare facilities. Drinking water was provided by hand pump and tube well; there were no public toilets. The village had a post office and public library, as well as at least some access to electricity for all purposes. Streets were made of pakka materials.
