= Daudpur, Kishni =

Village in Uttar Pradesh, India

Daudpur
- Village
- Location in Uttar Pradesh, India
- Coordinates: 27.09866°N 79.26473°E
- Country: India
- State: Uttar Pradesh
- District: Mainpuri
- Tehsil: Bhongaon

Area
  - Total: 3.744 km^{2} (1.446 sq mi)

Population (2011)
  - Total: 1,894
  - Density: 505.9/km^{2} (1,310/sq mi)
- Time zone: UTC+5:30 (IST)

Daudpur (Dāūdpur) is a village in Kishni block of Mainpuri district, Uttar Pradesh. As of 2011, it had a total population of 1,894, in 325 households.

== Demographics ==
As of 2011, Daudpur had a population of 1,894, in 325 households. This population was 53.7% male (1,017) and 46.3% female (877). The 0-6 age group numbered 271 (157 male and 114 female), or 14.3% of the total population. 568 residents were members of Scheduled Castes, or 30.0% of the total.

The 1981 census recorded Daudpur as having a population of 959 people, in 148 households.

The 1961 census recorded Daudpur as comprising 4 hamlets, with a total population of 603 people (327 male and 276 female), in 112 households and 92 physical houses. The area of the village was given as 939 acres.

== Infrastructure ==
As of 2011, Daudpur had 1 primary school; it did not have any healthcare facilities. Drinking water was provided by tap, well, hand pump, and tube well; there were no public toilets. The village had a post office and public library, as well as at least some access to electricity for residential and agricultural purposes. Streets were made of kachcha materials.
