= Bhadei =

Village in Uttar Pradesh, India

- Village
- Location in Uttar Pradesh, India
- Coordinates: 27.07789°N 79.39215°E
- Country: India
- State: Uttar Pradesh
- District: Mainpuri
- Tehsil: Bhongaon

Area
  - Total: 4.624 km^{2} (1.785 sq mi)

Population (2011)
  - Total: 3,259
  - Density: 704.8/km^{2} (1,825/sq mi)
- Time zone: UTC+5:30 (IST)

Bhadei (Bhadeī) is a village in Kishni block of Mainpuri district, Uttar Pradesh, India. As of 2011, it had a total population of 3,259, in 513 households.

== Demographics ==
As of 2011, Bhadei had a population of 3,259, in 513 households. This population was 53.9% male (1,757) and 46.1% female (1,502). The 0-6 age group numbered 511 (256 male and 255 female), or 15.7% of the total population. 1,202 residents were members of Scheduled Castes, or 36.9% of the total.

The 1981 census recorded Bhadei as having a population of 2,085 people, in 396 households.

The 1961 census recorded Bhadei (as "Bhadai") as comprising 11 hamlets, with a total population of 1,453 people (810 male and 643 female), in 247 households and 204 physical houses. The area of the village was given as 1,146 acres and it had a post office at that point.

== Infrastructure ==
As of 2011, Bhadei had 1 primary school; it did not have any healthcare facilities. Drinking water was provided by hand pump and tube well; there were no public toilets. The village had a post office and public library, as well as at least some access to electricity for all purposes. Streets were made of both kachcha and pakka materials.
