= Kamalner =

Village in Uttar Pradesh, India

- Village
- Location in Uttar Pradesh, India
- Coordinates: 27.11677°N 79.25304°E
- Country: India
- State: Uttar Pradesh
- District: Mainpuri
- Tehsil: Bhongaon

Area
  - Total: 2.83 km^{2} (1.09 sq mi)

Population (2011)
  - Total: 983
  - Density: 347/km^{2} (900/sq mi)
- Time zone: UTC+5:30 (IST)

Kamalner (or Kamālner) is a village in Kishni block of Mainpuri district, Uttar Pradesh. As of 2011, it had a total population of 983, in 161 households.

== Demographics ==
As of 2011, Kamalner had a population of 983, in 161 households. This population was 52.2% male (513) and 47.8% female (470). The 0-6 age group numbered 176 (87 male and 89 female), or 17.9% of the total population. 145 residents were members of Scheduled Castes, or 14.8% of the total.

The 1981 census recorded Kamalner as having a population of 533 people, in 95 households.

The 1961 census recorded Kamalner (as "Kanmal Ner") as comprising 3 hamlets, with a total population of 346 people (193 male and 153 female), in 65 households and 47 physical houses. The area of the village was given as 694 acres.

== Infrastructure ==
As of 2011, Kamalner had 1 primary school; it did not have any healthcare facilities. Drinking water was provided by hand pump and tube well; there were no public toilets. The village had a post office and public library, as well as at least some access to electricity for all purposes. Streets were made of pakka materials.
