= Gangdaspur =

Village in Uttar Pradesh, India

- Village
- Location in Uttar Pradesh, India
- Coordinates: 27.17966°N 79.23824°E
- Country: India
- State: Uttar Pradesh
- District: Mainpuri
- Tehsil: Bhongaon

Area
  - Total: 1.263 km^{2} (0.488 sq mi)

Population (2011)
  - Total: 1,037
  - Density: 821.1/km^{2} (2,127/sq mi)
- Time zone: UTC+5:30 (IST)

Gangdaspur (Gaṅgdāspur) is a village in Kishni block of Mainpuri district, Uttar Pradesh. As of 2011, it had a total population of 1,037, in 161 households.

== Demographics ==
As of 2011, Gangdaspur had a population of 1,037, in 161 households. This population was 53.2% male (552) and 46.8% female (485). The 0-6 age group numbered 160 (74 male and 86 female), or 15.4% of the total population. 5 residents were members of Scheduled Castes, or 0.5% of the total.

The 1981 census recorded Gangdaspur as having a population of 702 people, in 116 households.

The 1961 census recorded Gangdaspur as comprising 2 hamlets, with a total population of 471 people (251 male and 220 female), in 74 households and 54 physical houses. The area of the village was given as 314 acres.

== Infrastructure ==
As of 2011, Gangdaspur had 1 primary school; it did not have any healthcare facilities. Drinking water was provided by hand pump and tube well; there were no public toilets. The village had a post office but no public library; there was at least some access to electricity for all purposes. Streets were made of both kachcha and pakka materials.
