= Gopalpur, Kishni =

Village in Uttar Pradesh, India

Gopalpur
- Village
- Location in Uttar Pradesh, India
- Coordinates: 27.07974°N 79.42579°E
- Country: India
- State: Uttar Pradesh
- District: Mainpuri
- Tehsil: Bhongaon

Area
  - Total: 0.525 km^{2} (0.203 sq mi)

Population (2011)
  - Total: 181
  - Density: 345/km^{2} (893/sq mi)
- Time zone: UTC+5:30 (IST)
- PIN: 209720

Gopalpur (Gopālpur) is a village in Kishni block of Mainpuri district, Uttar Pradesh. As of 2011, it had a total population of 181, in 24 households.

== Demographics ==
As of 2011, Gopalpur had a population of 181, in 24 households. This population was 54.1% male (98) and 45.9% female (83). The 0-6 age group numbered 43 (19 male and 24 female), or 23.8% of the total population. No residents were members of Scheduled Castes.

The 1981 census recorded Gopalpur as having a population of 95 people, in 16 households.

The 1961 census recorded Gopalpur as comprising 1 hamlet, with a total population of 54 people (31 male and 23 female), in 14 households and 10 physical houses. The area of the village was given as 120 acres.

== Infrastructure ==
As of 2011, Gopalpur did not have any schools or healthcare facilities. Drinking water was provided by hand pump and tube well; there were no public toilets. The village had a post office but no public library; there was at least some access to electricity for all purposes. Streets were made of kachcha materials.
