= Ghutara Masumpur =

Village in Uttar Pradesh, India

- Village
- Location in Uttar Pradesh, India
- Coordinates: 27.17048°N 79.25783°E
- Country: India
- State: Uttar Pradesh
- District: Mainpuri
- Tehsil: Bhongaon

Area
  - Total: 3.083 km^{2} (1.190 sq mi)

Population (2011)
  - Total: 2,707
  - Density: 878.0/km^{2} (2,274/sq mi)
- Time zone: UTC+5:30 (IST)

Ghutara Masumpur (Ghuṭārā Masūmpur) is a village in Kishni block of Mainpuri district, Uttar Pradesh, India. As of 2011, it had a total population of 2,707, in 436 households.

== Demographics ==
As of 2011, Ghutara Masumpur had a population of 2,707, in 436 households. This population was 53.9% male (1,459) and 46.1% female (1,248). The 0-6 age group numbered 302 (168 male and 134 female), or 11.2% of the total population. 123 residents were members of Scheduled Castes, or 4.5% of the total.

The 1981 census recorded Ghutara Masumpur as having a population of 1,889 people, in 275 households.

The 1961 census recorded Ghutara Masumpur (as "Guthara Masumpur") as comprising 3 hamlets, with a total population of 1,302 people (726 male and 576 female), in 230 households and 173 physical houses. The area of the village was given as 775 acres.

== Infrastructure ==
As of 2011, Ghutara Masumpur had 2 primary schools and 1 veterinary hospital but no healthcare facilities for humans. Drinking water was provided by hand pump and tube well; there were no public toilets. The village had a post office but no public library; there was at least some access to electricity for all purposes. Streets were made of both kachcha and pakka materials.
