= National Highway 234 (India) =

National highway in India

National Highway 234
- Map of National Highway 234 in red

Route information
- Auxiliary route of NH 34
- Length: 156 km (97 mi)

Major junctions
- From: Kannauj
- To: Bhongaon

Location
- Country: India
- States: Uttar Pradesh
- Primary destinations: Bidhuna, Etawah, Kishni

Highway system
- Roads in India; Expressways; National; State; Asian
← NH 34	→ NH 34

National Highway 234 is a national highway of India It was earlier known as National Highway 121 before renumbering of all national highways by National Highway Authority of India in 2010.

== Route ==
- NH34 near Kannauj
- Bidhuna
- Etawah
- Kishni
- NH 34 near Bhongaon
