= Kishni =

- Town
- Location in Uttar Pradesh, India
- Coordinates: 27.02°N 79.27°E
- Country: India
- State: Uttar Pradesh
- District: Mainpuri
- Tehsil: Kishni

Government
  - MLA: Engineer Brijesh Katheriya

Area
  - Total: 19 km^{2} (7.3 sq mi)
- Elevation: 153 m (502 ft)

Population (2011)
  - Total: 11,098
  - Density: 580/km^{2} (1,500/sq mi)

Languages
  - Official: Hindi
- Time zone: UTC+5:30 (IST)
- Vehicle registration: UP-84
- Highways: Agra–Lucknow Expressway, National Highway 234 (India)

Kishni is a town in Bhongaon tehsil of Mainpuri district in the Indian state of Uttar Pradesh. It is also the seat of a community development block. As of 2011, the town of Kishni has a population of 11,098, in 5,832 households.

== Geography ==
Kishni is located at 27.02°N 79.27°E. It has an average elevation of 153 metres (501 feet).

Kishni is about 35 km from Mainpuri, the district headquarters, and about 39 km from Etawah. It is located near the eastern edge of Mainpuri district.

== History ==
At the turn of the 20th century, Kishni comprised 14 hamlets and had a police station, post office, and village school. It was then part of pargana Kishni-Nabiganj. As of 1901, its population was 2,339.

The 1961 census recorded Kishni (then still a village) as comprising 15 hamlets, with a total population of 3,066 people (1,633 male and 1,433 female), in 573 households and 368 physical houses. The area of the village was given as 3,116 acres and it had a post office and medical practitioner at that point.

== Demographics ==
Historical population
Year	Pop.	±%
1981	4,717	—
1991	6,772	+43.6%
2001	8,911	+31.6%
2011	11,098	+24.5%
Source: 2011 Census of India

As of the 2011 census, Kishni had a population of 11,098, in 5,832 households. This population was 52.6% male (5,832) and 47.4% female (5,266). The 0-6 age group numbered 1,557 (816 male and 741 female), or 14.0% of the total population. 2,094 residents were members of Scheduled Castes, or 18.9% of the total. The town's literacy rate was 81.25% (counting only people age 7 and up); this was 87.50% among males and 74.32% among females.

== Economy ==
Among the most important businesses in Kishni are rice and watermelon processing. As of 2009, Kishni had 1 nationalised bank, 0 private commercial banks, 3 cooperative banks, and 2 agricultural credit societies.

Kishni hosts markets twice per week; grain, cloth, and vegetables are the main commodities sold.

== Infrastructure ==
As of 2011, Kishni has 1 hospital with 5 beds, 13 medicine shops, 8 schools teaching at the primary level, and 4 schools teaching at the secondary level. There is no public library. Drinking water is provided by tap, from a treated source. Water is stored in overhead tank(s), with a total capacity of 500 kilolitres. The town has a local fire department.

== Transport ==
Kishni is located on the Etawah-Farrukhabad highway, and a smaller road coming from Sirsaganj in the west has its eastern end at Kishni. There is no railway station; the nearest is in Bhongaon, 36 km away.

== List of villages under Kishni block ==
The following 95 villages are counted as part of Kishni CD block:

1. Alawalpur
2. Alilpur Keshavpur
3. Arjunpur
4. Arsara
5. Badanpur
6. Baghauni
7. Bahoranpur
8. Bansar Mau
9. Bariha
10. Barua Chamar
11. Basait
12. Bhadei
13. Chauraipur
14. Chitain
15. Daudpur
16. Dhakaroi
17. Dharauss
18. Dharminpur
19. Diwanpur Sahini
20. Gadanpur Gapcharia
21. Gangdaspur
22. Ghutara Masoompur
23. Gopalpur
24. Gulariapur
25. Harchandpur Kharagpur
26. Hempur
27. Hirauli
28. Husainpur
29. Ichhaipur
30. Illahabad
31. Inderpur Sujanpur
32. Isapur Dikhatmai
33. Jatpura
34. Jawapur
35. Kaithauli
36. Kaithpur
37. Kamalner
38. Kamalpur
39. Khijarpur
40. Khwajapur
41. Kitah
42. Kumhaul
43. Kunhupur
44. Kursanda
45. Kutubpur
46. Legaon
47. Lodhipur Budauli
48. Mahganwan
49. Maholi Shamsherganj
50. Manigaon
51. Mokhampur
52. Murausee
53. Nagathara
54. Nagla Bale
55. Nagla Barhaipur
56. Nagla Baruanadi
57. Nagla Baune
58. Nagla Bhagauti
59. Nagla Birtia
60. Nagla Chunnu
61. Nagla Dinu
62. Nagla Game
63. Nagla Gokul
64. Nagla Jakha
65. Nagla Kale
66. Nagle Khiriya
67. Nagla Khoni
68. Nagla Kumhar
69. Nagla Kumhaul
70. Nagla Maholi
71. Nagla Mathuria
72. Nagla Midiya
73. Nagla Murli
74. Nagla Puwayan
75. Naigawan Khiria
76. Paharpur
77. Parasrampur
78. Partappur
79. Pharaijee
80. Pooranpur
81. Ramnagar
82. Rangpur
83. Ratanpur Haripur
84. Ratheh
85. Ratibhanpur
86. Sailpur
87. Sakra
88. Saman
89. Sathigawan
90. Saunasee
91. Shivpur
92. Signee
93. Singhpur
94. Somarpur
95. Tariha
96. Uncha Islamabad

== Nearby cities ==
- Etawah
