= Ratheh =

Village in Uttar Pradesh, India

Ratheh Rathe
- Village
- Location in Uttar Pradesh, India
- Coordinates: 27.03628°N 79.33152°E
- Country: India
- State: Uttar Pradesh
- District: Mainpuri
- Tehsil: Bhongaon

Area
  - Total: 10.648 km^{2} (4.111 sq mi)

Population (2011)
  - Total: 5,193
  - Density: 487.7/km^{2} (1,263/sq mi)
- Time zone: UTC+5:30 (IST)

Ratheh, also spelled Rathe (Raṭhe), is a village in Kishni block of Mainpuri district, Uttar Pradesh. As of 2011, it has a total population of 5,193, in 933 households.

== Demographics ==
As of 2011, Ratheh had a population of 5,193, in 933 households. This population was 54.5% male (2,831) and 45.5% female (2,362). The 0-6 age group numbered 769 (414 male and 355 female), or 14.8% of the total population. 820 residents were members of Scheduled Castes, or 15.8% of the total.

The 1981 census recorded Ratheh as having a population of 3,354 people, in 569 households.

The 1961 census recorded Ratheh as comprising 15 hamlets, with a total population of 2,094 people (1,169 male and 925 female), in 395 households and 299 physical houses. The area of the village was given as 2,631 acres.

== Infrastructure ==
As of 2011, Ratheh had 1 primary school; it did not have any healthcare facilities. Drinking water was provided by tap, well, hand pump, and tube well; there were no public toilets. The village had a post office and public library, as well as at least some access to electricity for all purposes. Streets were made of both kachcha and pakka materials.
