= Baghauni =

Village in Uttar Pradesh, India

- Village
- Location in Uttar Pradesh, India
- Coordinates: 27.06062°N 79.30345°E
- Country: India
- State: Uttar Pradesh
- District: Mainpuri
- Tehsil: Bhongaon

Area
  - Total: 4.163 km^{2} (1.607 sq mi)

Population (2011)
  - Total: 2,249
  - Density: 540.2/km^{2} (1,399/sq mi)
- Time zone: UTC+5:30 (IST)

Baghauni (Baghaunī) is a village in Kishni block of Mainpuri district, Uttar Pradesh. As of 2011, it has a total population of 2,249, in 380 households.

== Demographics ==
As of 2011, Baghauni had a population of 2,249, in 380 households. This population was 54.2% male (1,219) and 45.8% female (1,030). The 0-6 age group numbered 245 (139 male and 106 female), or 10.9% of the total population. 140 residents were members of Scheduled Castes, or 6.2% of the total.

The 1981 census recorded Baghauni as having a population of 1,315 people, in 197 households.

The 1961 census recorded Baghauni as comprising 7 hamlets, with a total population of 889 people (502 male and 387 female), in 146 households and 115 physical houses. The area of the village was given as 1,080 acres.

== Infrastructure ==
As of 2011, Baghauni had 1 primary school; it did not have any healthcare facilities. Drinking water was provided by tap, hand pump, and tube well; there were no public toilets. The village had a post office and public library, as well as at least some access to electricity for all purposes. Streets were made of both kachcha and pakka materials.
