= Uncha Islamabad =

Village in Uttar Pradesh, India

- Village
- Location in Uttar Pradesh, India
- Coordinates: 27.06261°N 79.3925°E
- Country: India
- State: Uttar Pradesh
- District: Mainpuri
- Tehsil: Bhongaon

Area
  - Total: 4.58 km^{2} (1.77 sq mi)

Population (2011)
  - Total: 2,990
  - Density: 653/km^{2} (1,690/sq mi)
- Time zone: UTC+5:30 (IST)

Uncha Islamabad (ū̃chā Islāmābād) is a village in Kishni block of Mainpuri district, Uttar Pradesh, India. As of 2011, it had a total population of 2,990, in 494 households.

== Demographics ==
As of 2011, Uncha Islamabad had a population of 2,990, in 494 households. This population was 54.9% male (1,643) and 45.1% female (1,347). The 0-6 age group numbered 488 (266 male and 222 female), or 16.3% of the total population. 1,243 residents were members of Scheduled Castes, or 41.6% of the total.

The 1981 census recorded Uncha Islamabad as having a population of 2,089 people, in 346 households.

The 1961 census recorded Uncha Islamabad as comprising 5 hamlets, with a total population of 1,368 people (771 male and 597 female), in 262 households and 124 physical houses. The area of the village was given as 1,157 acres.

== Infrastructure ==
As of 2011, Uncha Islamabad had 1 primary school; it did not have any healthcare facilities. Drinking water was provided by tap, hand pump, and tube well; there were no public toilets. The village had a post office and public library, as well as at least some access to electricity for residential and agricultural purposes. Streets were made of kachcha materials.
