= Bansarmau =

Village in Uttar Pradesh, India

- Village
- Location in Uttar Pradesh, India
- Coordinates: 27.07873°N 79.32568°E
- Country: India
- State: Uttar Pradesh
- District: Mainpuri
- Tehsil: Bhongaon

Area
  - Total: 1.344 km^{2} (0.519 sq mi)

Population (2011)
  - Total: 691
  - Density: 514/km^{2} (1,330/sq mi)
- Time zone: UTC+5:30 (IST)
- PIN: 206303

Bansarmau (Bansarmaū) is a village in Kishni block of Mainpuri district, Uttar Pradesh. As of 2011, it has a total population of 691, in 114 households.

== Demographics ==
As of 2011, Bansarmau had a population of 691, in 114 households. This population was 51.4% male (355) and 48.6% female (336). The 0-6 age group numbered 106 (59 male and 47 female), or 15.3% of the total population. 339 residents were members of Scheduled Castes, or 49.1% of the total.

The 1981 census recorded Bansarmau as having a population of 509 people, in 105 households.

The 1961 census recorded Bansarmau as comprising 2 hamlets, with a total population of 335 people (176 male and 159 female), in 70 households and 49 physical houses. The area of the village was given as 351 acres.

== Infrastructure ==
As of 2011, Bansarmau had 1 primary school; it did not have any healthcare facilities. Drinking water was provided by tap and hand pump; there were no public toilets. The village did not have a post office or public library; there was at least some access to electricity for all purposes. Streets were made of both kachcha and pakka materials.
