= Mudausi =

Village in Uttar Pradesh, India

Mudausi Murausee
- Village
- Location in Uttar Pradesh, India
- Coordinates: 27.08396°N 79.22928°E
- Country: India
- State: Uttar Pradesh
- District: Mainpuri
- Tehsil: Bhongaon

Area
  - Total: 11.00 km^{2} (4.25 sq mi)

Population (2011)
  - Total: 3,168
  - Density: 288.0/km^{2} (745.9/sq mi)
- Time zone: UTC+5:30 (IST)

Mudausi, also spelled Murausi or Murausee (Muḍausī), is a village in Kishni block of Mainpuri district, Uttar Pradesh. As of 2011, it has a total population of 3,168, in 531 households.

== Demographics ==
As of 2011, Mudausi had a population of 3,168, in 531 households. This population was 54.3% male (1,721) and 45.7% female (1,447). The 0-6 age group numbered 547 (289 male and 258 female), or 17.3% of the total population. 357 residents were members of Scheduled Castes, or 11.3% of the total.

The 1981 census recorded Mudausi as having a population of 2,276 people, in 399 households.

The 1961 census recorded Mudausi (as "Mundausi") as comprising 11 hamlets, with a total population of 1,526 people (821 male and 705 female), in 282 households and 246 physical houses. The area of the village was given as 2,359 acres.

== Infrastructure ==
As of 2011, Mudausi had 1 primary school; it did not have any healthcare facilities. Drinking water was provided by tap, well, hand pump, and tube well; there were no public toilets. The village had a post office and public library, as well as at least some access to electricity for all purposes. Streets were made of kachcha materials.
