= Allahabad, Mainpuri =

Village in Uttar Pradesh, India

Allahabad
- Village
- Location in Uttar Pradesh, India
- Coordinates: 27.15153°N 79.23617°E
- Country: India
- State: Uttar Pradesh
- District: Mainpuri
- Tehsil: Bhongaon

Area
  - Total: 11.955 km^{2} (4.616 sq mi)

Population (2011)
  - Total: 7,438
  - Density: 622.2/km^{2} (1,611/sq mi)
- Time zone: UTC+5:30 (IST)
- PIN: 206302

Allahabad (Ilāhābād), also called Ilahabans, is a village in Kishni block of Mainpuri district, Uttar Pradesh. It hosts markets twice per week. A bit to the east of the village centre is the shrine of a Muslim saint who is revered locally by both Muslims and Hindus. As of 2011, Allahabad has a total population of 7,438, in 1,169 households.

== Geography ==
Allahabad is located about 13 km southeast of Bhongaon, the tehsil headquarters.

According to the 2011 census, Allahabad has a total area of 1,195.5 hectares, of which 994.4 were currently farmland, 47.6 were fallow lands, and 122.0 were under non-agricultural use. 20.6 hectares were occupied by orchards, 1.3 were occupied by permanent pastures, 7.2 were classified as cultivable but not currently under any agricultural use, and 0 were classified as non-cultivable. 2.0 hectares of forests also existed on village lands.

== History ==
At the turn of the 20th century, Allahabad was described as comprising 19 hamlets, with a total population of 3,024 as of 1901. Most of the local residents were employed in agriculture; there were also a few merchants who worked as shopkeepers in the local bazar. Besides the bazar and the shrine, the village also had a school and a post office. The village's zamindar was Nawab Mehdi Ali Khan of Shamsabad, Farrukhabad.

== Shrine ==
A bit to the east of the village centre is the mausoleum of a Muslim saint who is locally revered by both Hindus and Muslims. After the Thursday market, locals from both faiths, especially women, visit the shrine with prayers and offerings.

== Economy ==
Allahabad hosts markets twice per week; the days are given as either Monday and Thursday or Monday and Friday. The main items bought and sold are grain, cloth, and vegetables. As of 2011, there are no banks or agricultural credit societies in Allahabad. The main staple crops grown by local farmers are wheat and rice.

== Demographics ==
As of 2011, Allahabad had a population of 7,438, in 1,169 households. This population was 53.2% male (3,960) and 46.8% female (3,478). The 0-6 age group numbered 1,178 (590 male and 588 female), or 15.8% of the total population. 2,251 residents were members of Scheduled Castes, or 30.3% of the total.

The 1981 census recorded Allahabad as having a population of 4,233 people, in 744 households.

The 1961 census recorded Allahabad as comprising 12 hamlets, with a total population of 3,319 people (1,878 male and 1,441 female), in 666 households and 530 physical houses. The area of the village was given as 2,978 acres.

== Infrastructure ==
As of 2011, Hirauli had 1 primary school; it did not have any healthcare facilities. Drinking water was provided by hand pump and tube well; there were no public toilets. The village had a post office but no public library; there was at least some access to electricity for all purposes. Streets were made of both kachcha and pakka materials.
