= Nagthara =

Village in Uttar Pradesh, India

- Village
- Location in Uttar Pradesh, India
- Coordinates: 27.08575°N 79.35984°E
- Country: India
- State: Uttar Pradesh
- District: Mainpuri
- Tehsil: Bhongaon

Area
  - Total: 1.142 km^{2} (0.441 sq mi)

Population (2011)
  - Total: 734
  - Density: 643/km^{2} (1,660/sq mi)
- Time zone: UTC+5:30 (IST)
- PIN: 206303

Nagthara (Nagtharā or नगथारा Nagthārā) is a village in Kishni block of Mainpuri district, Uttar Pradesh. As of 2011, it has a total population of 734, in 128 households.

== Demographics ==
As of 2011, Nagthara had a population of 734, in 128 households. This population was 53.3% male (391) and 46.7% female (343). The 0-6 age group numbered 89 (46 male and 43 female), or 12.1% of the total population. 165 residents were members of Scheduled Castes, or 22.5% of the total.

The 1981 census recorded Nagthara as having a population of 602 people, in 107 households.

The 1961 census recorded Nagthara as comprising 4 hamlets, with a total population of 467 people (244 male and 223 female), in 85 households and 72 physical houses. The area of the village was given as 283 acres.

== Infrastructure ==
As of 2011, Nagthara did not have any schools or healthcare facilities. Drinking water was provided by hand pump and tube well; there were no public toilets. The village had a post office but no public library; there was at least some access to electricity for all purposes. Streets were made of both kachcha and pakka materials.
