= Majhupur =

Coordinates: 27°02′N 79°25′E

Majhupur is a village located in Kannauj district in the Indian state of Uttar Pradesh. The village was founded by Manju Singh Sikarwar.

There is a temple named Thakur Ji Maharaj Mandir which is well known locally.
