= Deoha =

Deoha Nanda Garra
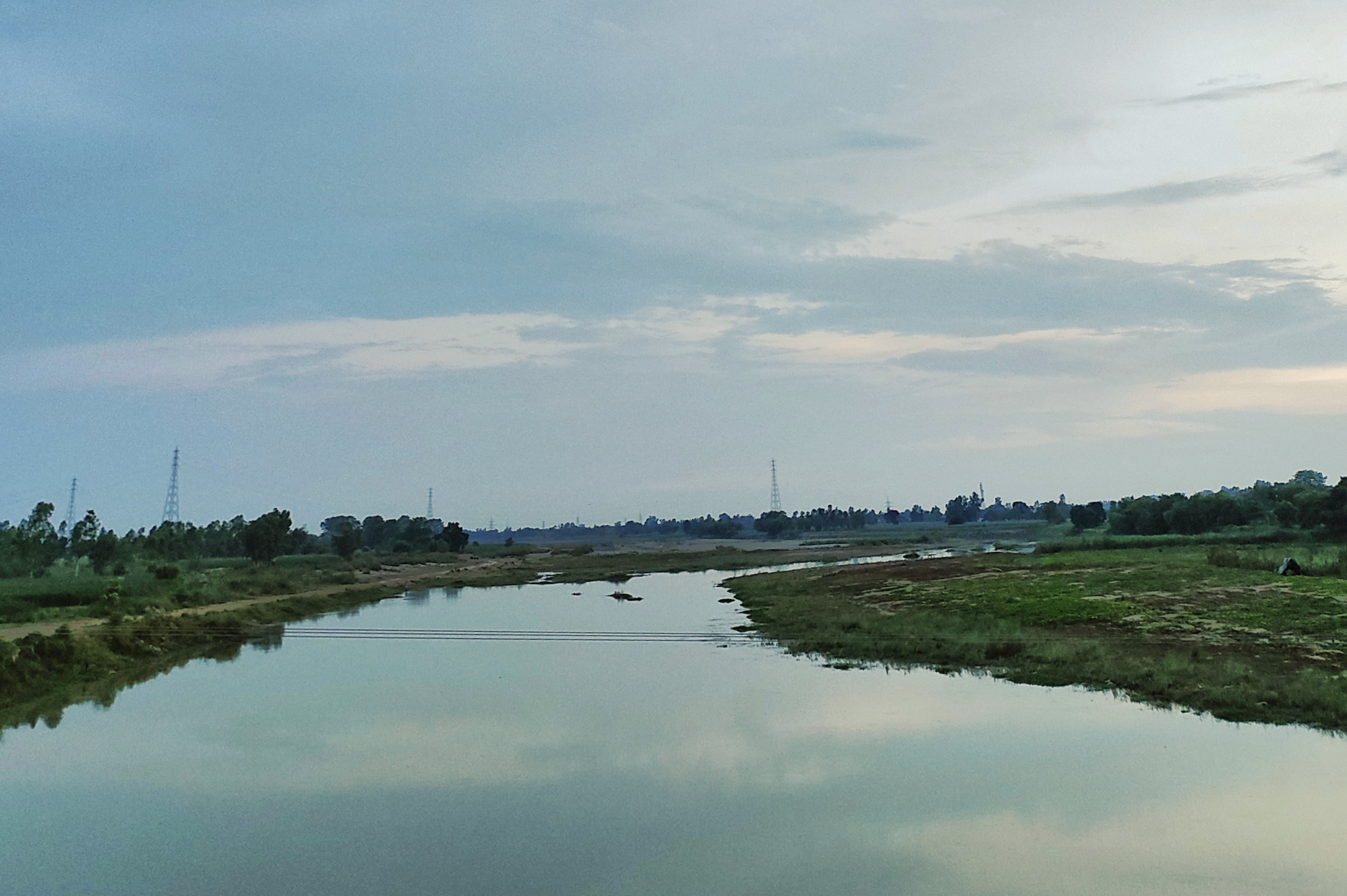
- Deoha River flowing by Pilibhit

Location
- Country: India
- State: Uttarakhand, Uttar Pradesh
- City: Nanakmatta, Pilibhit, Shahjahanpur

Physical characteristics
- Mouth: Ramganga
  - coordinates: 27°08′26″N 79°56′45″E

The Deoha is a tributary of the Ramganga river. It rises in the Shivalik Hills and flows through the states of Uttarakhand and Uttar Pradesh. It is known by the names of Nanda or Nandhaur in the Kumaon region of Uttarakhand. Upon its entry into the plains of Uttar Pradesh, the river gets the name of Deoha. Further downstream, it is also known as Garra.

The holy sikh town of Nanakmatta is located on the banks of Deoha, and it is where the Nanak Sagar dam has been constructed on the river. Pilibhit, Bisalpur, Shahjahanpur and Sandi are other major cities located on its banks.

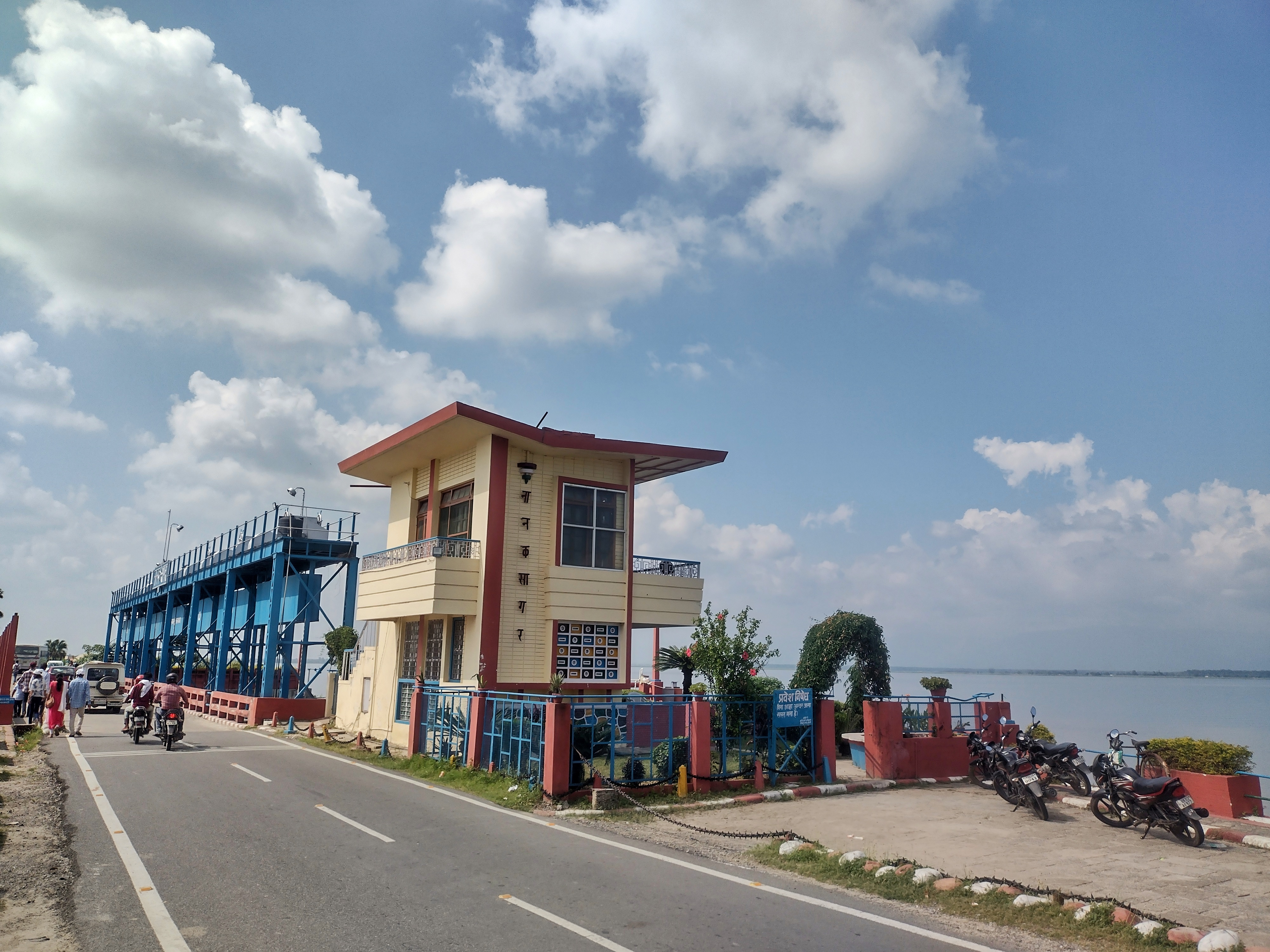
Nanak Sagar Dam at Nanakmatta

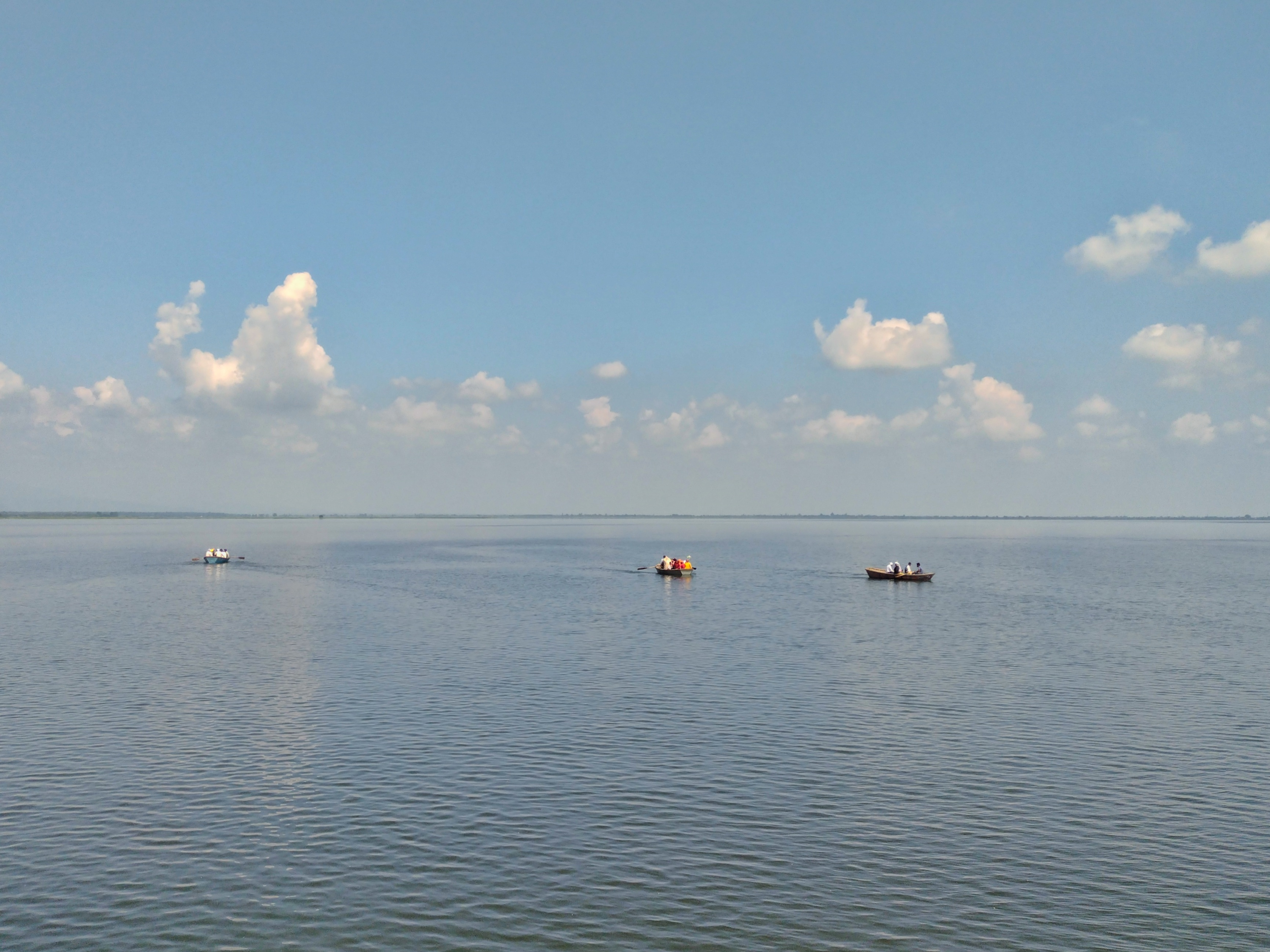
Nanak Sagar Lake at Nanakmatta

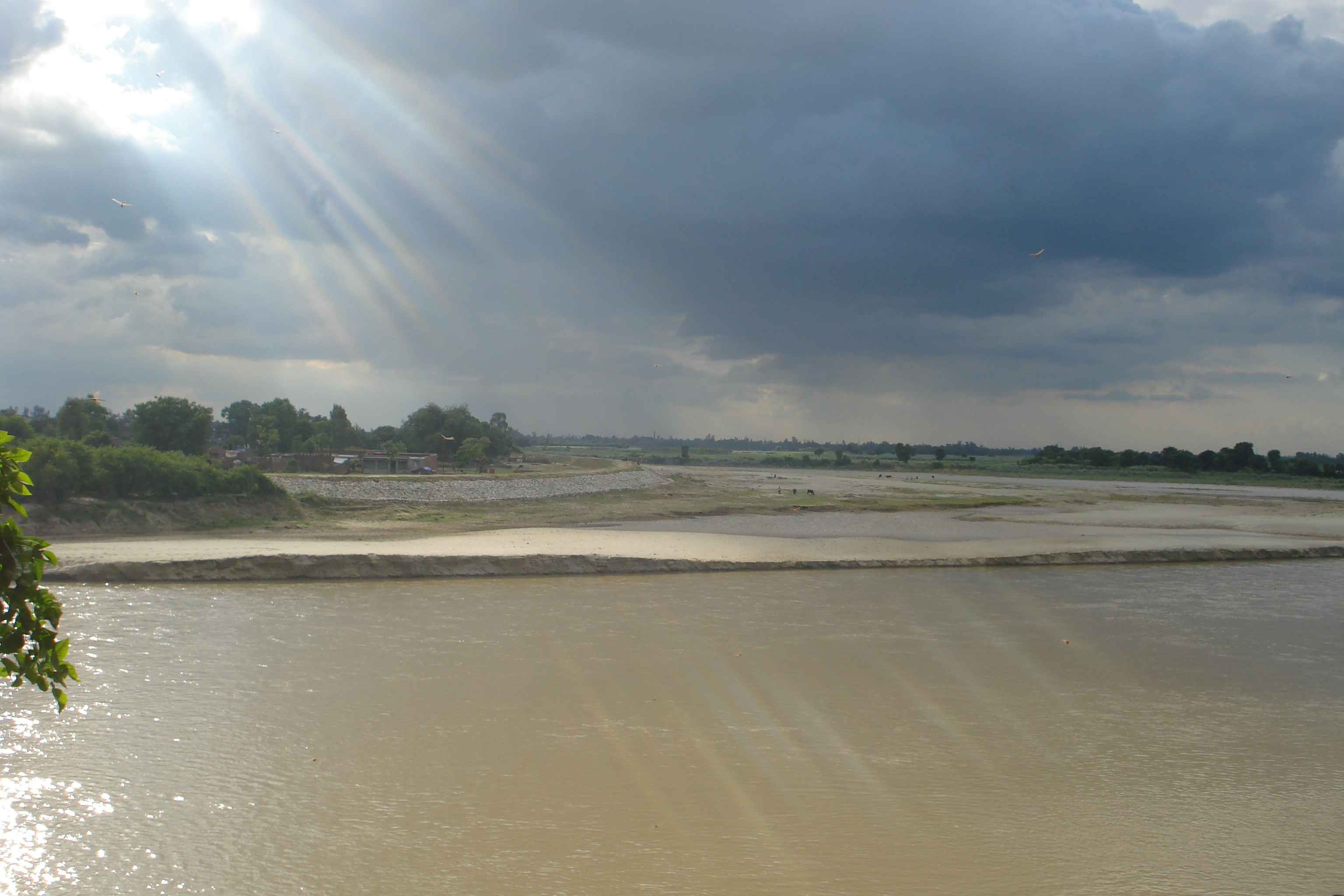
Garra river at Shahjahanpur

== See also ==
- Nandhaur Wildlife Sanctuary
