= Nanakmatta =

Town in Uttarakhand, India

- town
- Location in Uttarakhand, India Nanakmatta (India)
- Coordinates: 28°56′26″N 79°48′44″E
- Country: India
- State: Uttarakhand
- District: Udham Singh Nagar
- Established: 1880

Government
  - Type: Nagar Panchayat
  - Body: Nanakmatta Nagar Panchayat
  - Chairman: Prem Singh Turna (BJP)

Area
  - Total: 5.88 km^{2} (2.27 sq mi)
- Elevation: 298 m (978 ft)

Population (2011)
  - Total: 8,470 approx
  - Density: 1,440/km^{2} (3,730/sq mi)

Languages
- Time zone: UTC+5:30 (IST)
- PIN: 262311
- Telephone code: 05948
- Vehicle registration: UK 06
- Website: uk.gov.in

Nanakmatta is a town named after the Sikh pilgrimage site, Gurdwara Nanak Mata Sahib, also known as Gurdwara Nanakmatta Sahib, in the state of Uttarakhand, India.

Sikh tradition says it was once called Gorakhmata, a centre of Siddh-jogis named after the founder of their order, Gorakhnath, and that it was renamed Nanakmatta after a visit which the Siddh-Gost in Guru Granth Sahib said Guru Nanak, the founder of Sikhism, made in which he discussed religion.

It is on the bank of Deoha stream, which is dammed into a reservoir named Nanak Sagar.

It is also an Uttarakhand Legislative Assembly constituency within the Nainital-Udhamsingh Nagar (Lok Sabha constituency).

== Gallery ==
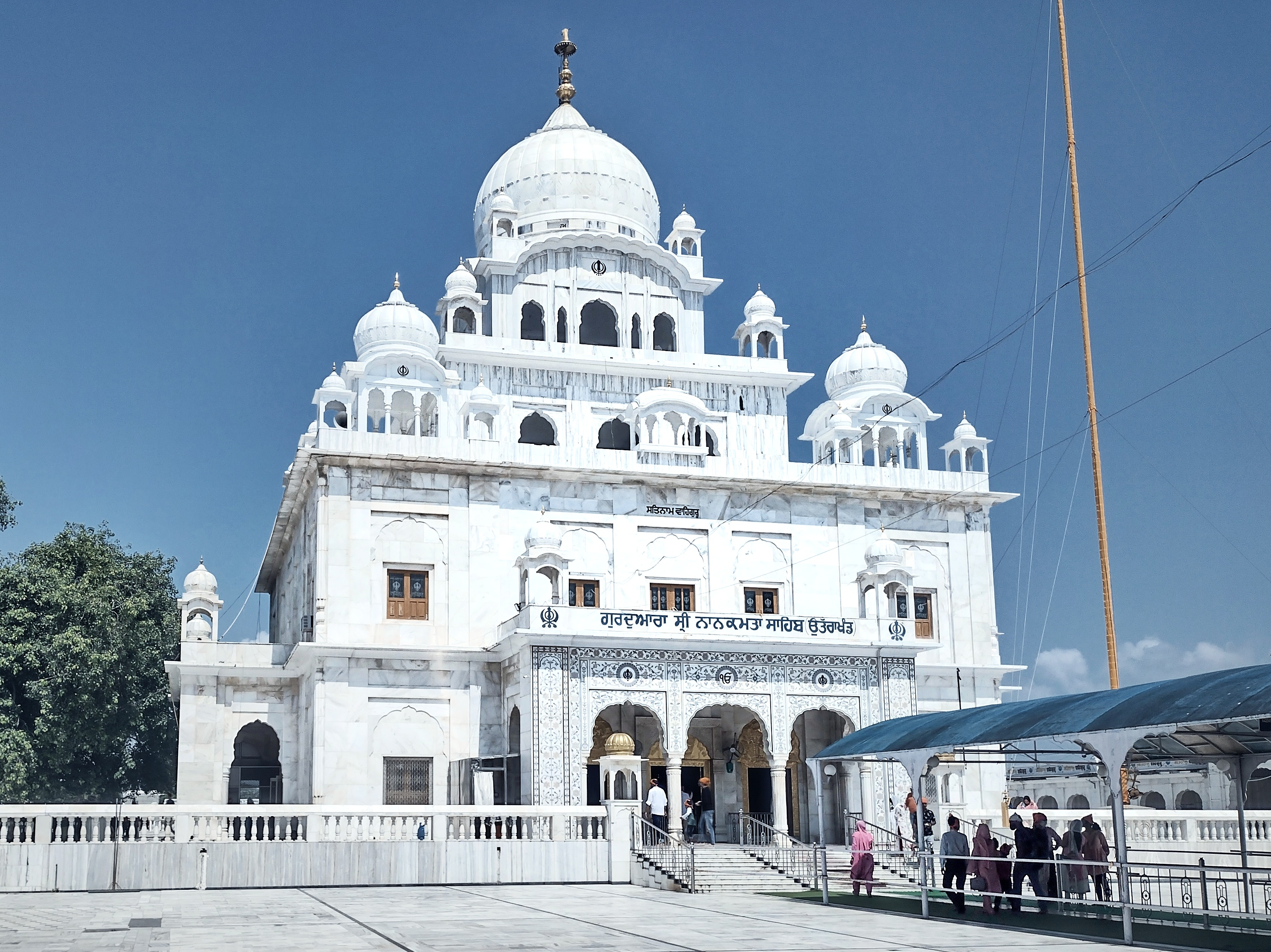
Gurudwara Nanakmatta Sahib

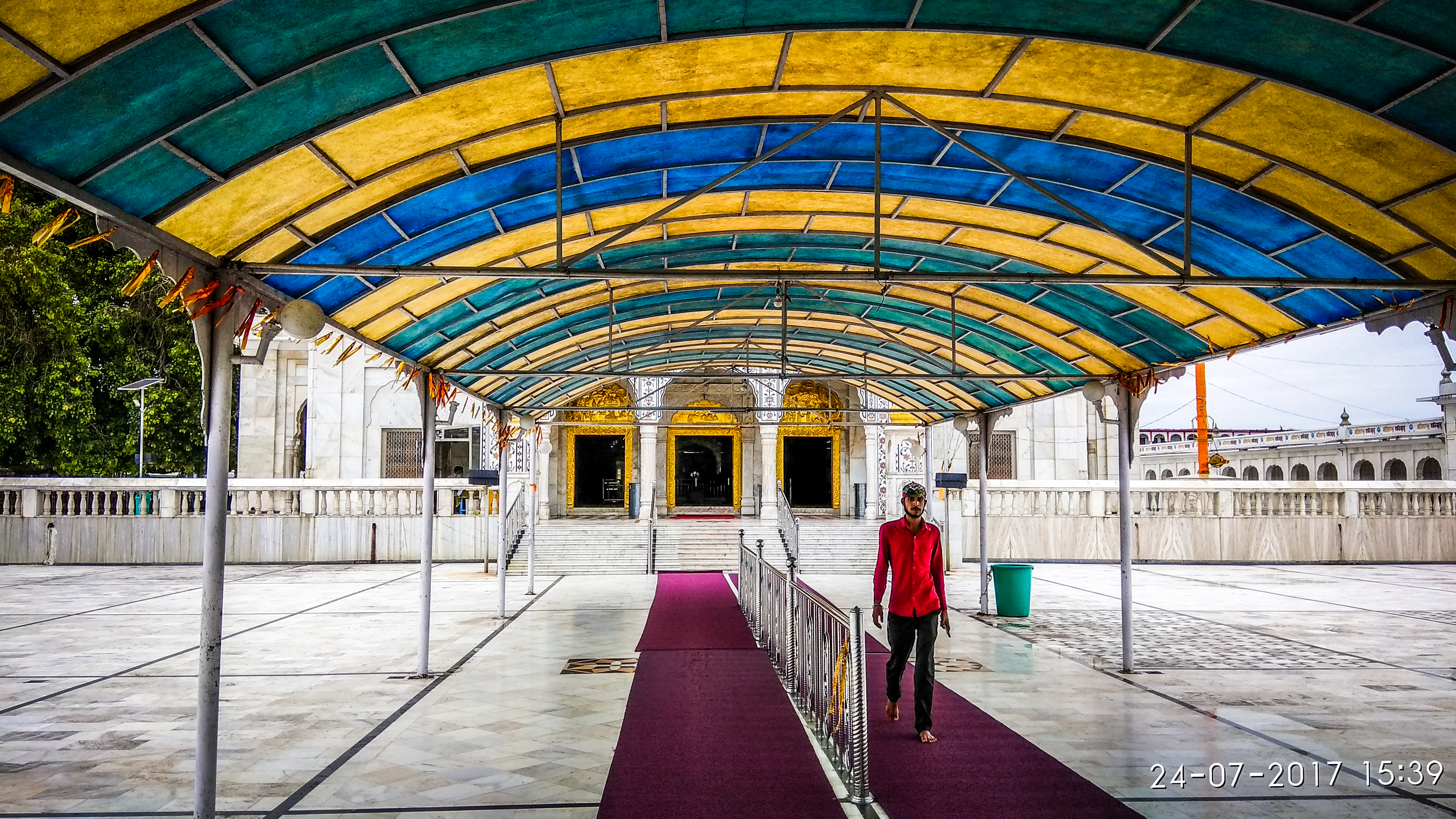
Entrance to Gurudwara Nanakmatta

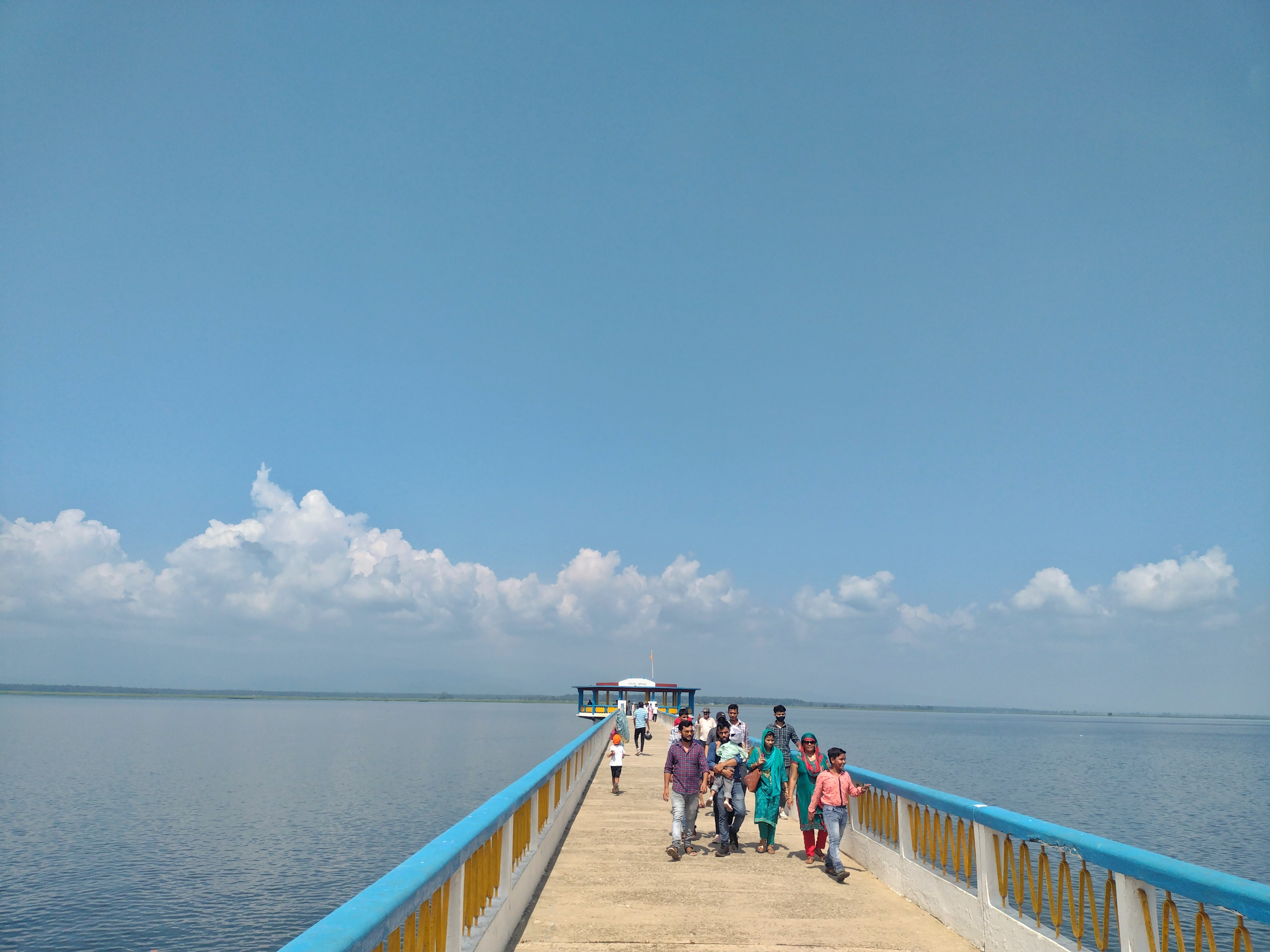
Gurudwara Bauli Sahib

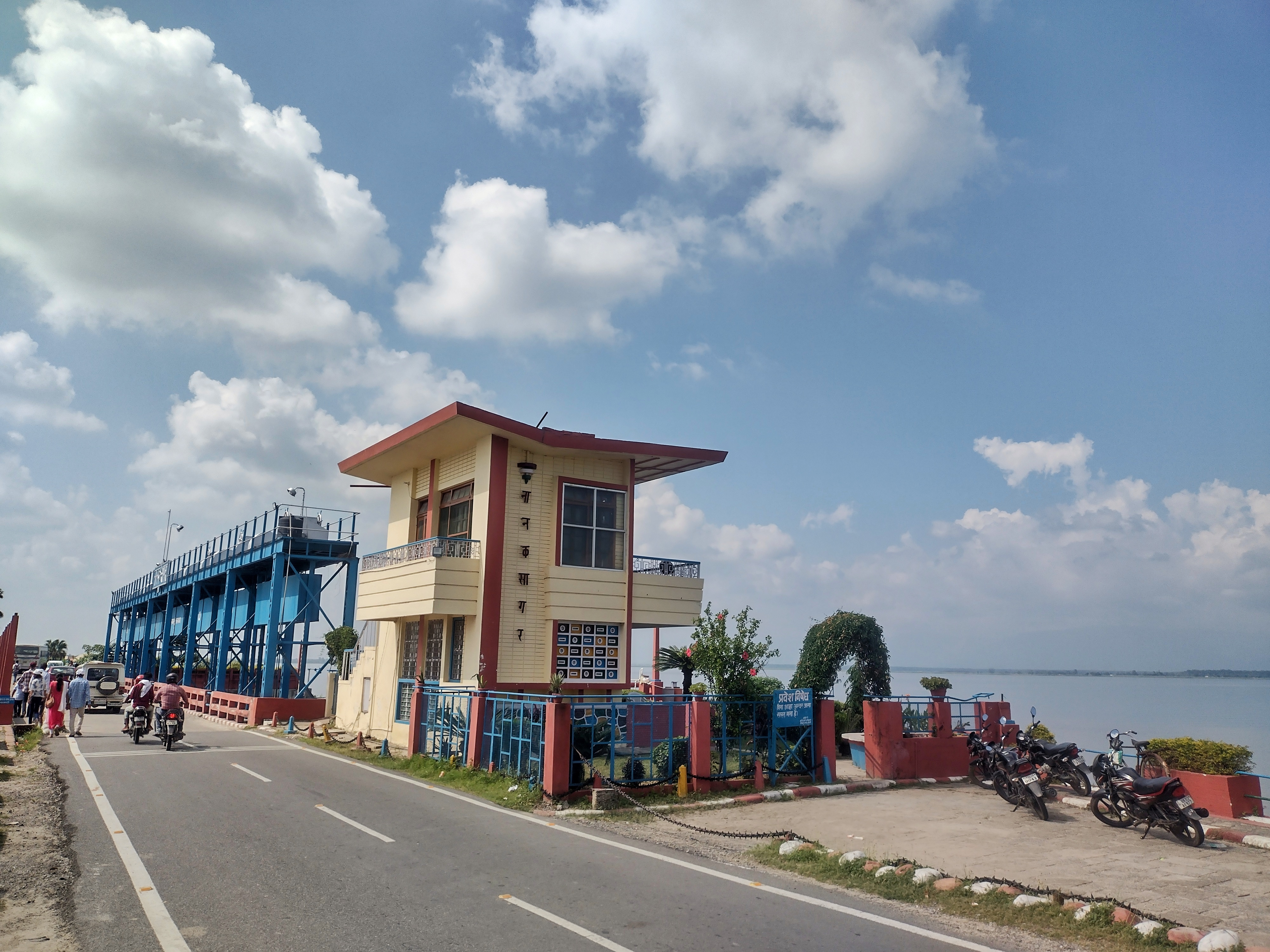
Nanak Sagar Dam

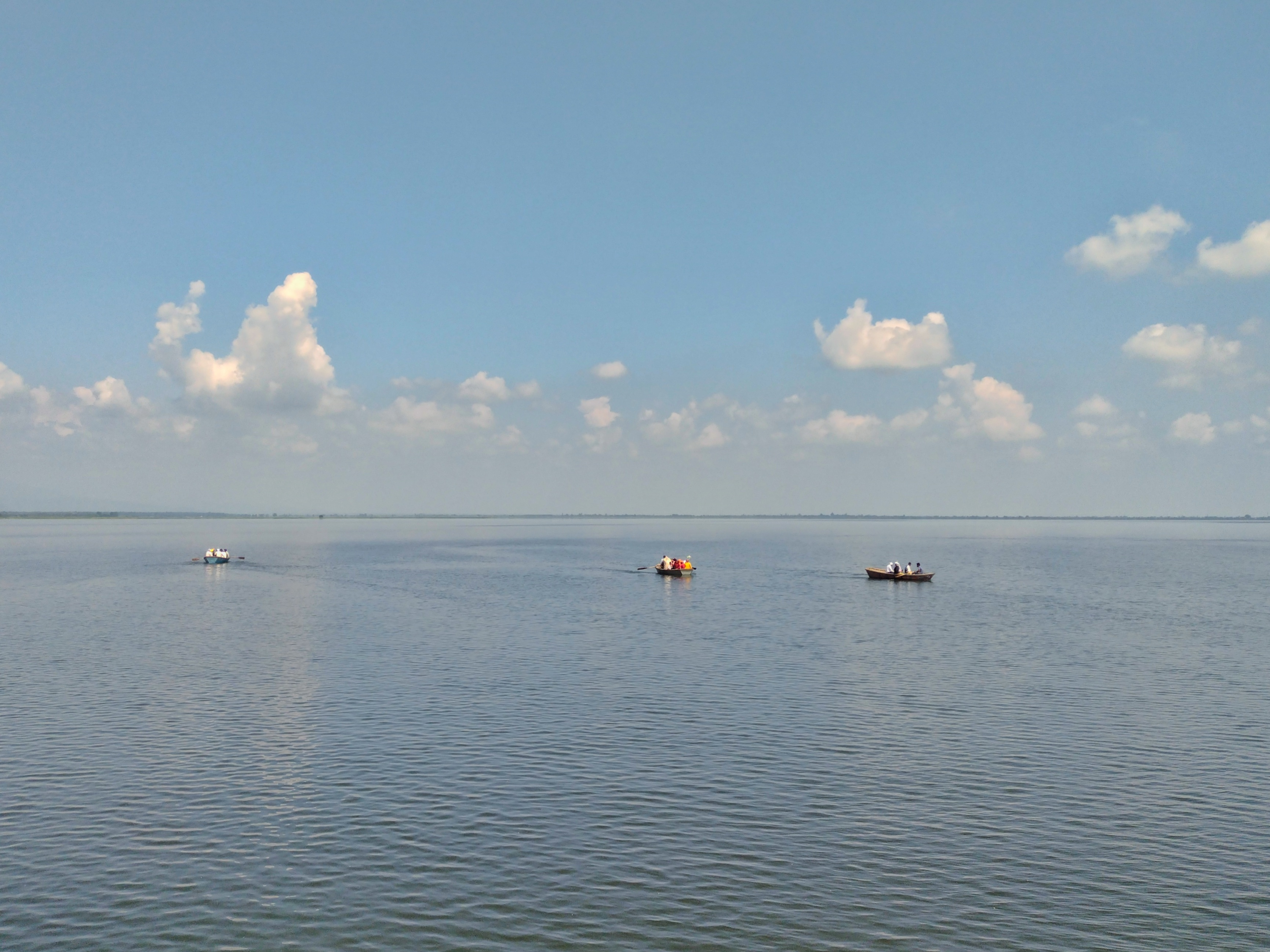
Nanak Sagar Lake
