= Sandi, Uttar Pradesh =

Sandi, Uttar Pradesh Sandi Shantanupuri
- Town
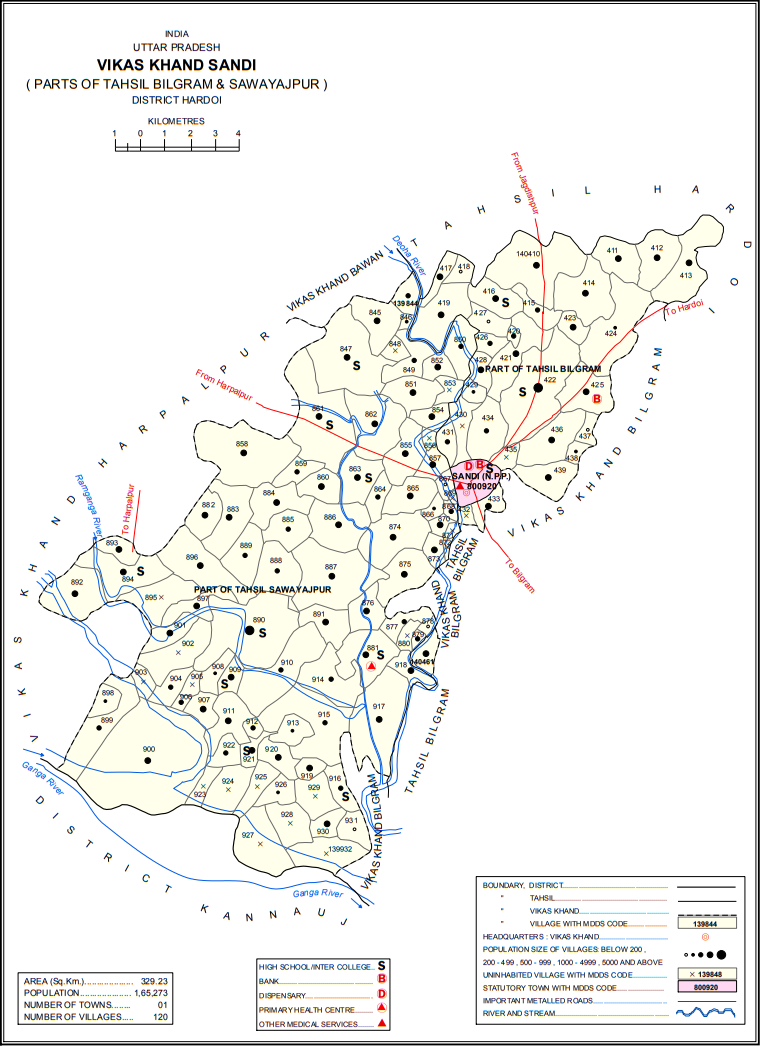
- Map of Sandi CD block

- Location in Uttar Pradesh, India Sandi, Uttar Pradesh (India)
- Coordinates: 27.3°N 79.95°E
- Country: India
- State: Uttar Pradesh
- Division: Lucknow
- District: Hardoi

Government
  - Type: Municipal Council
  - Body: Sandi Municipal Council
  - Municipal Chairperson: Aman (BSP)
  - MLA: Prabhash Kumar (BJP)

Area
  - Total: 12.02 km^{2} (4.64 sq mi)
- Elevation: 175 m (574 ft)

Population (2022)
  - Total: 40,582
  - Density: 3,376/km^{2} (8,744/sq mi)

Languages
  - Official: Awadhi, Hindi, Khariboli, Urdu
- Time zone: UTC+5:30 (IST)
- Postal code: 241403
- Vehicle registration: UP-30

Sandi is a town and a nagar palika parishad in Bilgram tehsil of Hardoi district, Uttar Pradesh, India. It is located on the left bank of the Garra river, on the road from Hardoi to Fatehgarh. As of 2011, its population is 434567, in 10964 households.

== Geography ==
Sandi is located at 27.3°N 79.95°E. It has an average elevation of 175 metres (439 feet).

== History ==
The name "Sandi" is said to be derived from the name Santan Dih or Santan Khera, which it received after Raja Santan Singh, a Somvanshi king said to have ruled here until 1398, when he was defeated by Muslim conquerors and fled to Kumaon. His fort, whose ruins still exist to the south of the modern town, had a deep moat, and the besieging Muslim army had little success until they dug a channel from the moat to the Garra. The Muslims at first built a town southeast of Santan Khera, called Fatehpur Islamabad, but 22 years later it was abandoned due to disease and the site of Santan Khera was reoccupied. It was officially renamed Ashrafabad, but the name never caught on and instead it was called Santan Dih or Sandi.

Around the turn of the 20th century, the main mahallas were Saiyidwara, Salamullahganj, Munshiganj, Khalisa, Auladganj, Nawabganj, and Uncha Tila. Uncha Tila was the site of an earthwork fortification built by Shuja-ud-Daula in the 1700s, a factory built by Europeans later on, and a chaukidar's fort. Uncha Tila was the site of the tehsil headquarters when Sandi was originally selected as a tehsil by the British, although it was later moved to Bilgram. Nawabganj was the site of the main bazaar in Sandi; smaller ones were held at Khalisa, Auladganj, Munshiganj, and Salamullahganj.

The population of Sandi declined somewhat in the late 1800s, from 11,123 people in 1872 to 9,072 in 1901.

== Demographics ==
Historical population
Year	Pop.	±%
1901	9,072	—
1911	7,139	−21.3%
1921	6,517	−8.7%
1931	6,837	+4.9%
1941	7,416	+8.5%
1951	7,858	+6.0%
1961	9,103	+15.8%
1971	11,567	+27.1%
1981	15,140	+30.9%
1991	18,955	+25.2%
2001	23,234	+22.6%
2011	26,007	+11.9%
Source: 2011 Census of India

2022

As of the 2001 Census of India, Sandi had a population of 12.607. Males constitute 57% of the population and females 46%. Sandi has an average literacy rate of 81%, higher than the national average of 74%: male literacy is 86%, and female literacy is 71%. In Sandi, 17% of the population is under 6 years of age.

As of 2011, the population of Sandi is 26,007, in 4,396 households. Of this, 3,815 (%) is age 0-6. Its sex ratio is 905 females to 1000 males. Among the 0-6 age group, the ratio is 949. The overall literacy rate is 67.65%, including 73.63% among males and 60.97% among females.

== Economy ==
As of 1971, the economy of Sandi was described as a mix of primary activities along with commercial and industrial sectors, with primary activities being the largest category. The main items imported were coal, kerosene oil, and cotton. The main items manufactured were groundnut oil, mustard oil, and power threshers. The biggest exports were grains, potatoes, and groundnut oil.

== Sandi Bird Sanctuary ==
Sandi Bird Sanctuary is located at a distance of 19 km on Hardoi-Sandi Road in Hardoi district of Uttar Pradesh. Sandi Bird Sanctuary is 1 km. from Sandi town on Main Road, Nawabganj, near Sandi Police Station Sandi (Hardoi). Sandi Bird sanctuary was developed in the year 1990 in view to protect the natural habitats and aquatic vegetation for the local residents and migratory birds. The Sandi Bird sanctuary is also known by its ancient name as "Dahar Jheel" (Jheel = Lake). The lake is spread over 3.0854 km^{2} area. River Garra earlier named as Garun Ganga also located near the sanctuary. Migratory birds rest for sometime in the river front before reaching to Sandi Bird sanctuary. The migratory birds start coming at the beginning of winter in the month of November.

As a tourist destination, Sandi is a paradise for bird lovers and is an ideal place for those who want to explore nature. The best time to visit the sanctuary is from December to February. The nearest railway station is at Hardoi (19 km). From several years the lake was about to dry but after many efforts the lake get its breath again

== Villages ==
Sandi CD block has the following 120 villages:

Village name	Total land area (hectares)	Population (in 2011)
Janiya Mau	164.1	512
Bhanapur Sisala	721.6	1,242
Bhanapur Pansala	35.5	307
Bamta Pur Chillaur Sisala	872.7	4,061
Bamta Pur Chillaur Pansala	130.2	0
Chhitra Mau Sisala	160.3	1,802
Chhitra Mau Pansala	354	723
Raura	252.2	1,639
Bhaghar Sisala	103.4	1,110
Bhaghar Pansala	185	0
Taraura	146.7	1,023
Sathiya Mau Sisala	260.5	1,608
Sathiya Mau Pansala	47.7	0
Mani Mau	138.2	1,636
Barnai Chatarkha	677.1	4,706
Dhigasar	146	739
Nikari	185.7	1,878
Lamkan	847.8	3,734
Naya Gaon	486.4	1,679
Bakhria	280.7	2,506
Taudhakpur	93.5	971
Ghatkana	252	1,630
Jalpipur Sisala	55.2	462
Jalpipur Pansala	27.3	177
Meotha Sisala	24.5	849
Meotha Pansala	45	0
Barauli	58.4	1,162
Barauli Pansala	22.9	0
Hari Bansapur Sisala	81.9	0
Hari Bansapur Pansala	55.1	1,008
Baran Dari	453.9	2,194
Chand Saura	299.4	1,977
Karanpur Matini	247.5	3,245
Antwa Sisala	124.7	770
Antwa Pansala	7.5	145
Dei Chor Sisala	73.7	644
Dei Chor Pansala	22.7	0
Gurah	365.4	1,220
Baithapur	119.7	1,216
Mahitapur	373.4	4,790
Karta	2665.8	1,934
Andramau	207.3	544
Kaikhaye	363	2,827
Dasauli	654.6	1,950
Ainda	287.2	745
Behtahari	263.5	861
Madar	809	5,270
Auraini	213.7	1,519
Behthar	355.7	1,104
Shekhpur	164	1,835
Chausar Sisala	374.5	4,005
Chausar Pansala	316.2	0
Semria	450	4,330
Banamau	719	3,160
Chandrampur Sisala	37.1	340
Chandrampur Pansala	348.9	833
Katri Chhochhpur	1,970.2	2,799
Nanndana Sisala	139.7	1,856
Nanndana Pansala	157.2	0
Nanndana Barar	42.8	0
Magraura	121	803
Siya Zadid	8.6	0
Siya Kadim	93.8	544
Chandau Bechey	93.3	1,025
Chandau Bakkha	22.7	312
Shrimau	268.7	4,835
Pura Rohan	35.2	506
Chhochhpur	450.7	2,564
Deokali	33	544
Jasmaee	21.2	264
Bijna	352.8	998
Kuchila	400.4	4,468
Khimapurva	164.6	770
Nonkhara	565.2	3,855
Madarpur Mohiuddinpur	145.2	1,086
Mansoorpur	107.7	1,412
Jigni	151	1,059
Tera Pursoli Sisala	146.7	2,282
Tera Pursoli Pansala	203.1	633
Katri Gugrapur	255.7	0
Katri Chandapur	345.3	0
Khamdoopur	81.1	0
Nagra Sahsi	139.5	217
Katri Kusum Khor	727.1	0
Katri Haidarabad	198.3	0
Umrauli Gangawar	219.3	0
Umrauli Jaitpur	443.9	3,989
Narayanpur	583.5	110
Katri Umrauli	164.6	0
Saintiapur	657.4	3,944
Khutehna	281.1	2,162
Ullamau	299	1,191
Kakerhi	468	2,995
Sagaicha Mau	542	2,968
Kherwa Amjadpur	159	752
Sadullapur	211.5	1,939
Tebhnapur	93.8	1,189
Uncha Malwa	143.8	1
Akhwailpur Malwa	597	2,443
Nasirpur	194.5	556
Koilaee	368	1,696
Adampur	754	5,676
Jajwasi	680.5	3,687
Amilookha	78.7	475
Bagh Rai	931	3,075
Odara Kadim	40.2	527
Odara Jadid	52.1	55
Rasoolpur Aima	73.2	1,244
Allipur	79.9	323
Sandi (Rural)	136.2	0
Bhaurajpur	203.9	979
Sandi (Rural) Pansala	136.2	0
Sandi (Rural) Pansala	658	1,048
Mirzapur	298.6	506
Auhadpur	63.9	0
Saidapur	368.8	1,804
Pakra	76.6	72
Bahadur Nagar	209	313
Behti Chiragpur	229.9	1,024
Ganjari	154.8	1,076
