= Dasauli =

- Populated place
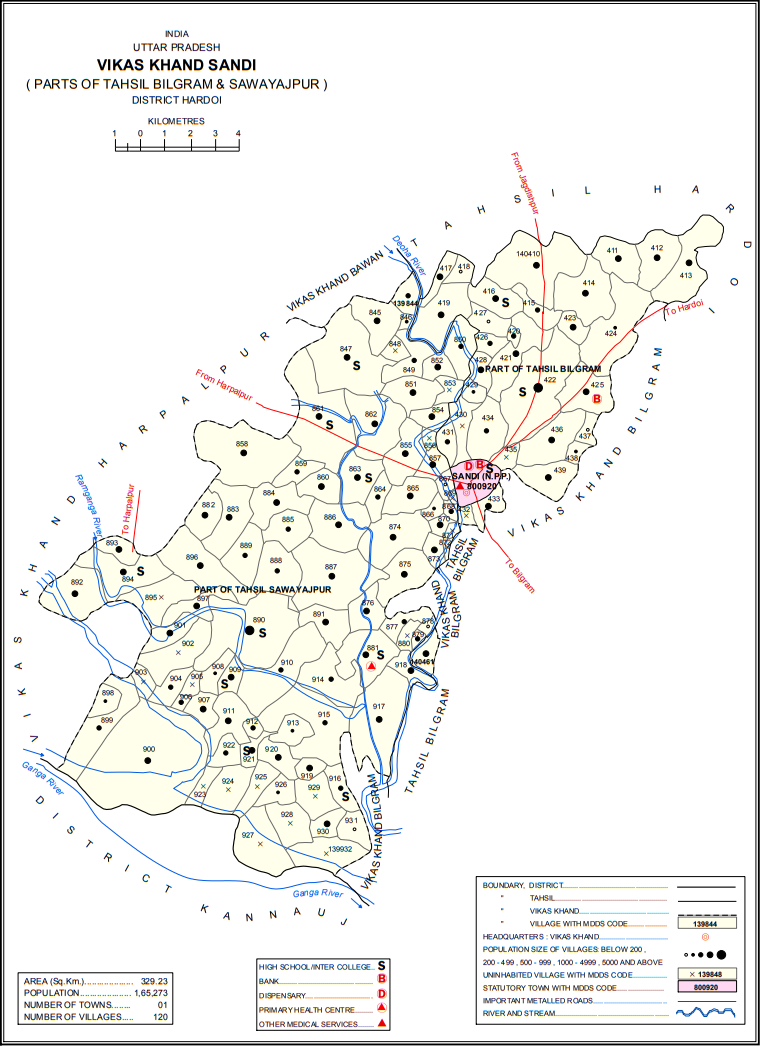
- Map showing Dasauli (#887) in Sandi CD block

- Location in Uttar Pradesh, India Dasauli (India)
- Coordinates: 27.2540°N 79.8972°E
- Country: India
- State: Uttar Pradesh
- District: Hardoi

Area
  - Total: 6.456 km^{2} (2.493 sq mi)

Population (2011)
  - Total: 1,950
  - Density: 302/km^{2} (782/sq mi)

Languages
  - Official: Hindi
- Time zone: UTC+5:30 (IST)

Dasauli is a village in Sandi block of Hardoi district, Uttar Pradesh, India. It is located 10 km away from Sandi, which is the nearest city. The main staple crops are wheat and rice. As of 2011, its population was 1,950, in 291 households.

The 1961 census recorded Dasauli as comprising 3 hamlets, with a total population of 474 (253 male and 221 female), in 83 households and 72 physical houses. The area of the village was given as 1,693 acres.

The 1981 census recorded Dasauli as having a population of 898, in 160 households, and covering an area of 685.16 hectares.
