= Kherwa Amjadpur =

- Populated place
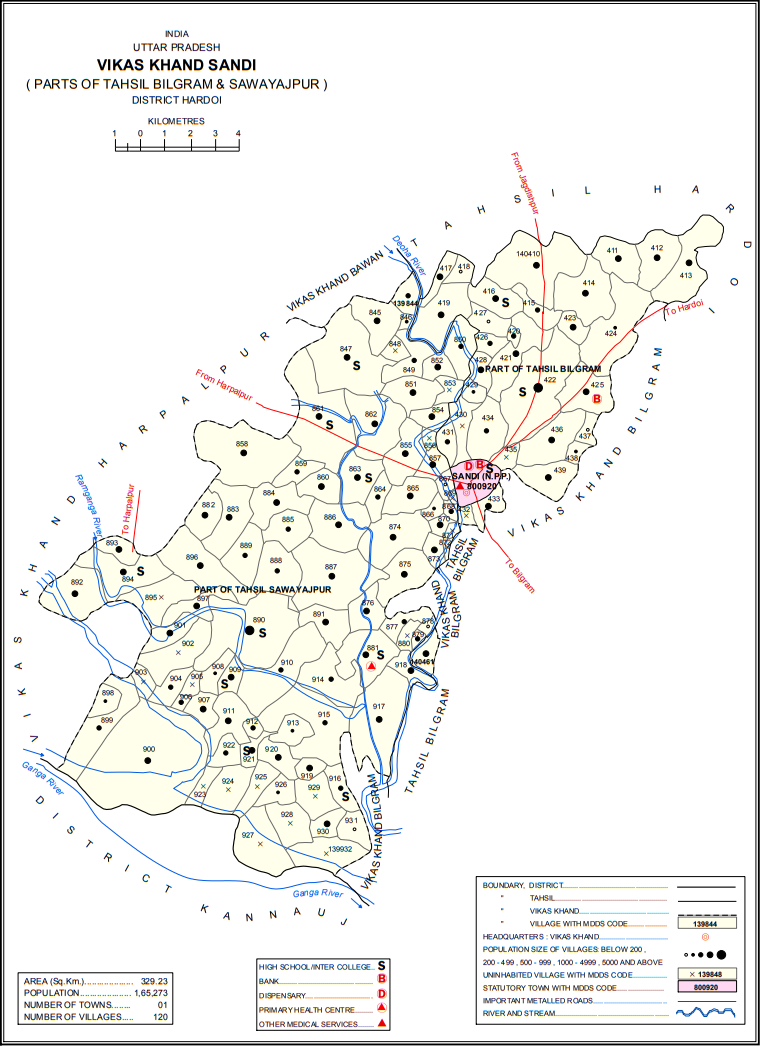
- Map showing Kherwa Amjadpur (#415) in Sandi CD block

- Location in Uttar Pradesh, India Kherwa Amjadpur (India)
- Coordinates: 27.346972°N 79.988745°E
- Country: India
- State: Uttar Pradesh
- District: Hardoi

Area
  - Total: 1.59 km^{2} (0.61 sq mi)

Population (2011)
  - Total: 752
  - Density: 473/km^{2} (1,220/sq mi)

Languages
  - Official: Hindi
- Time zone: UTC+5:30 (IST)

Kherwa Amjadpur is a village in Sandi block of Hardoi district, Uttar Pradesh, India. It is located 8 km (5.0 mi) away from Sandi, which is the nearest city. The village has one primary school. The main staple crops are wheat and maize. As of 2011, its population is 752, in 231 households.

The 1961 census recorded Kherwa Amjadpur (as "Khirwa Amzadpur") as comprising 1 hamlet, with a total population of 256 (139 male and 117 female), in 53 households and 43 physical houses. The area of the village was given as 397 acres.

The 1981 census recorded Kherwa Amjadpur as having a population of 387, in 77 households, and covering an area of 159.05 hectares.
