= Nikari =

Nikari Nikāri
- Populated place
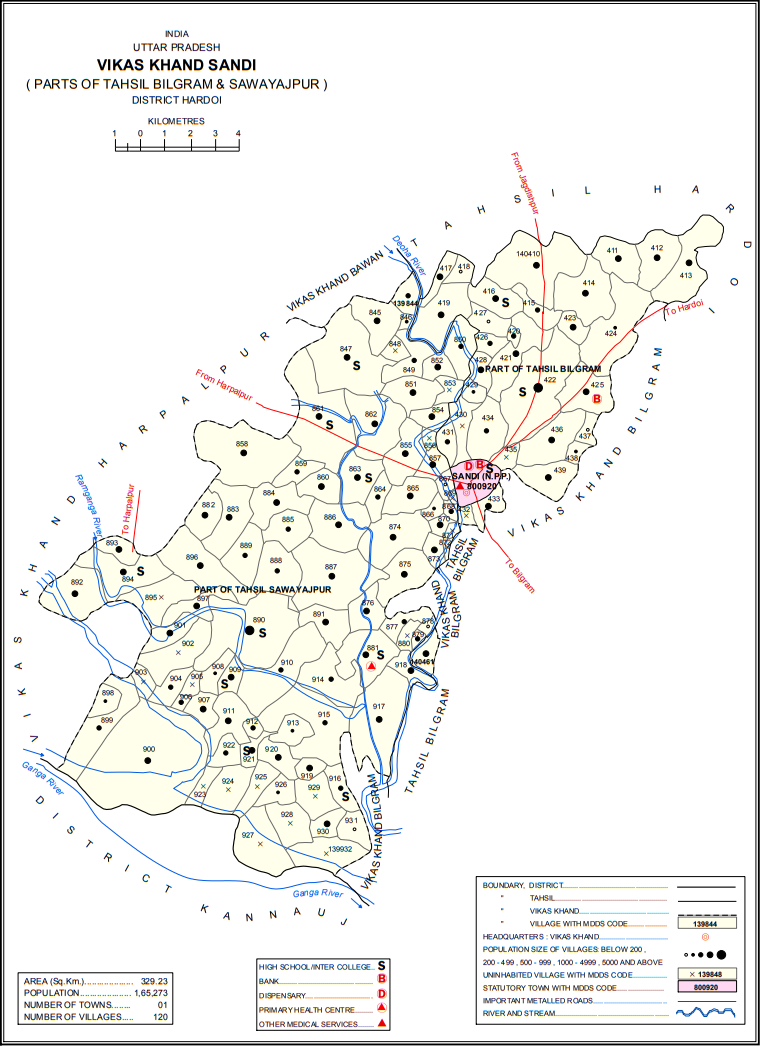
- Map showing Nikari (#860) in Sandi CD block

- Location in Uttar Pradesh, India Nikari (India)
- Coordinates: 27.288134°N 79.888502°E
- Country: India
- State: Uttar Pradesh
- District: Hardoi

Area
  - Total: 1.857 km^{2} (0.717 sq mi)

Population (2011)
  - Total: 1,878
  - Density: 1,011/km^{2} (2,619/sq mi)

Languages
  - Official: Hindi
- Time zone: UTC+5:30 (IST)

Nikari is a village in Sandi block of Hardoi district, Uttar Pradesh, India. It is located 8 km (5.0 mi) away from Sandi, which is the nearest city. The village has one primary school, and the main staple crops are wheat and rice. As of 2011, the population of Nikari is 1,878, in 283 households.

The 1961 census recorded Nikari as comprising 3 hamlets, with a total population of 607 (312 male and 295 female), in 110 households and 91 physical houses. The area of the village was given as 470 acres.

The 1981 census recorded Nikari as having a population of 915, in 158 households, and covering an area of 185.75 hectares.
