= Lamkan =

- Populated place
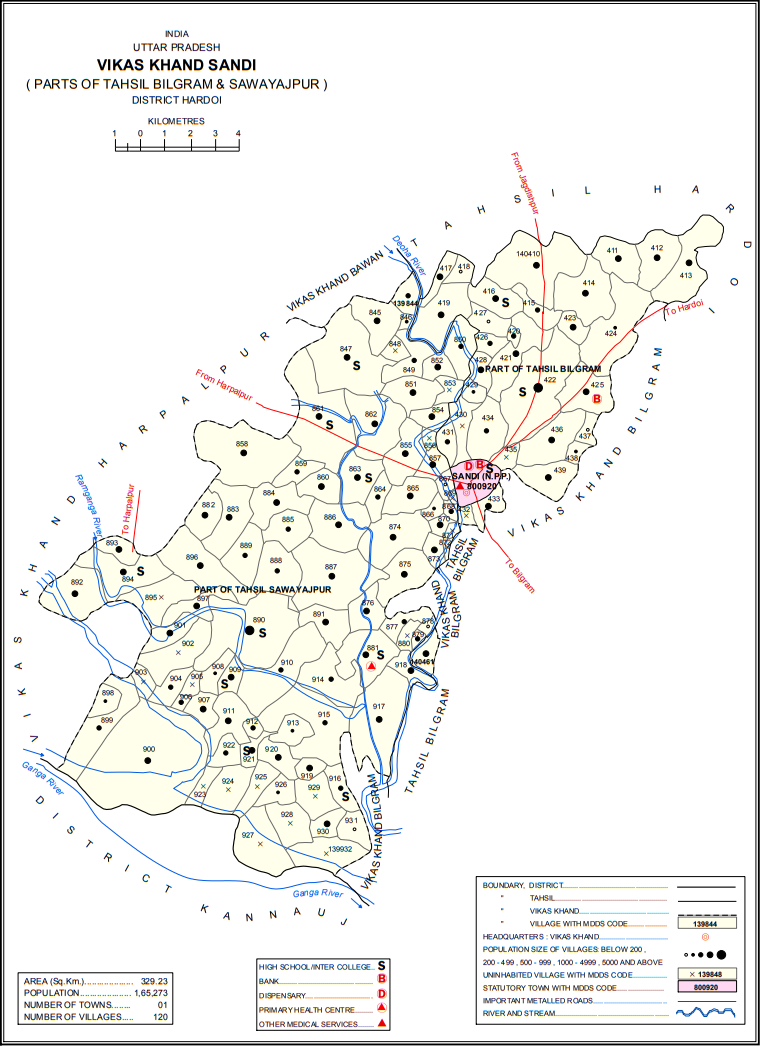
- Map showing Lamkan (#861) in Sandi CD block

- Location in Uttar Pradesh, India Lamkan (India)
- Coordinates: 27.302979°N 79.895072°E
- Country: India
- State: Uttar Pradesh
- District: Hardoi

Area
  - Total: 8.478 km^{2} (3.273 sq mi)

Population (2011)
  - Total: 3,734
  - Density: 440.4/km^{2} (1,141/sq mi)

Languages
  - Official: Hindi
- Time zone: UTC+5:30 (IST)

Lamkan is a village in Sandi block of Hardoi district, Uttar Pradesh, India. It is located 6 km away from Sandi, which is the nearest city. It is connected to state and national highways and has a sub post office and two primary schools but no healthcare facilities. The main staple crops are wheat and rice. As of 2011, its population is 3,734, in 577 households.

The 1961 census recorded Lamkan as comprising 4 hamlets, with a total population of 1,277 (692 male and 585 female), in 244 households and 181 physical houses. The area of the village was given as 2,114 acres. At the time, it had a medical practitioner and a post office and was connected to major roads.

The 1981 census recorded Lamkan as having a population of 2,070, in 333 households, and covering an area of 848.80 hectares.
