= Nandhaur Wildlife Sanctuary =

Wildlife sanctuary in Uttarakhand, India

- IUCN category IV (habitat/species management area)
- Location within Uttarakhand Location within India
- Interactive map of Nandhaur Wildlife Sanctuary
- Location: Uttarakhand, India
- Coordinates: 29°02′00″N 79°48′00″E
- Established: 2012

Nandhaur Wildlife Sanctuary is a wildlife sanctuary in Uttarakhand, India that was created in 2012. It is located in the Terai Arc Landscape, a forest zone that stretches from Uttarakhand in India and extends into Nepal.

== Location ==
Nandhaur Wildlife Sanctuary lies between the Gola and Sharda Rivers in the Haldwani forest division and links the forests of Ramnagar and Terai central forest division with Shuklaphanta National Park in Nepal. It extends over an area of 269.96 km^{2} (104.23 sq mi). Since 2002, Nandhaur Wildlife Sanctuary has been a part of the Shivalik Elephant Reserve. The Wildlife Institute of India in 2004 recognised Nandhaur Wildlife Sanctuary as one of three viable habitats key to the long-term future of the tiger.

== Wildlife ==
=== Flora ===
Nandhaur Wildlife Sanctuary is primarily a sal forest with more than 100 species of trees including shisham, bamboo, teak and chir pine. Over 30 species of shrubs and about 35 species of climbers and grasses were recorded.

=== Fauna ===
Nandhaur Wildlife Sanctuary hosts about 25 species of mammals, 250 species of birds, 15 species of reptiles and 20 species of fishes. The major mammalian species include Asian elephant, leopard, tiger and sloth bear. In 2026, the rare smooth-coated otter was spotted on the sanctuary.

== Threats ==
Nandhaur Wildlife Sanctuary is threatened by illegal logging and boulder mining, poaching and the diversion of forest land for non-forestry related developmental activities.
