= List of songs recorded by Shreya Ghoshal =

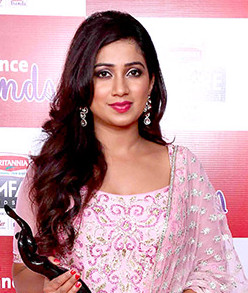
- Shreya Ghoshal at Filmfare Awards South.
- Category: Songs
Angika Songs	1
Assamese Songs	6
Bengali Film Songs	243
Bengali Non-Film Songs	87
Hindi Film Songs	940
Hindi Non-Film songs	192
Telugu Film Songs	274
Telugu Non-Film Songs	4
Tamil Film Songs	205
Tamil Non-Film Songs	5
Punjabi Film Songs	23
Punjabi Non-Film Songs	4
Marathi Film Songs	57
Marathi Non-Film Songs	14
Kannada Film Songs	311
Kannada Non-Film Songs	2
Malayalam Film Songs	110
Malayalam Non-Film Songs	5
Gujarati Film Songs	5
English Songs	9
French Songs	2
Bhojpuri Film Songs	81
Urdu Film Songs	10
Urdu Non-Film Songs	2
Tulu Songs	1
Nepali Songs	5
Odia Film Songs	1

Shreya Ghoshal (born 12 March 1984) is an Indian playback singer. She has sung professionally in over 20 languages including Hindi, Bengali, Malayalam, Kannada, Telugu, Tamil, Marathi, Odia, Assamese, Nepali, Bhojpuri, Arabic, French, Urdu, Sanskrit, Tulu, Gujarati, Punjabi, Tiwa, Rajasthani, & Braj Bhasha. She also sang few songs for live concerts in Malaysian, Sinhala, Swahili, English, Konkani and Ladakhi languages. Ghoshal's career began when she won the Sa Re Ga Ma Pa contest as an adult. Her Bollywood playback singing career began with Sanjay Leela Bhansali's Devdas for which she received her first National Film Award for Best Female Playback Singer along with Filmfare Award for Best Female Playback Singer and Filmfare RD Burman Award for New Music Talent. She has sung more than 3000 songs in 20 languages and especially 1150+ songs in hindi.

== Hindi film songs ==
=== 2002 ===
Film	No	Song	Composer(s)	Writer(s)	Co-artist(s)
Devdas	1	"Bairi Piya"	Ismail Darbar	Nusrat Badr	Udit Narayan
Devdas	2	"Silsila Ye Chahat Ka"	Ismail Darbar	Nusrat Badr	
Devdas	3	"Chalak Chalak Pyar Se"	Ismail Darbar	Nusrat Badr	Udit Narayan, Vinod Rathod
Devdas	4	"Morey Piya"	Ismail Darbar	Sameer Anjaan	Jaspinder Narula
Devdas	5	"Dola Re Dola"	Ismail Darbar	Nusrat Badr	Kavita Krishnamurthy, K.K.
Desh Devi	6	"Ek Phool Mein"	Ismail Darbar	Mehboob	Mohammed Salamat
Desh Devi	7	"Om Jayo Maa Ashapura"	Ismail Darbar	Mehboob	Ameya Date, Prashant S.
Desh Devi	8	"Taron Ki Odhke Jhilmil"	Ismail Darbar	Mehboob	Parthiv Gohil, Ameya Date
Zamaanat	9	"Ore Baba Ola"	Viju Shah	Shaan	

=== 2003 ===
Film	No	Song	Composer(s)	Writer(s)	Co-artist(s)
Tujhe Meri Kasam	10	"Azaadi Hai Pyari"	Viju Shah	Mehboob Kotwal	Shaan
Jism	11	"Jaadu Hai Nasha Hai" (Duet Version)	M. M. Keeravani	Neelesh Misra	Shaan
Jism	12	"Jaadu Hai Nasha Hai" (Female Version)	M. M. Keeravani	Neelesh Misra	
Jism	13	"Chalo Tumko Lekar Chale" (Version 1)	M. M. Keeravani	Neelesh Misra	
Jism	14	"Chalo Tumko Lekar Chale" (Version 2)	M. M. Keeravani	Neelesh Misra	
Saaya	15	"Aai Jo Teri Yaad" (Female Version)	Anu Malik	Praveen Bhardwaj	
Saaya	16	"Seena Pada" (Female Version)	Anu Malik	Sayeed Quadri	
Saaya	17	"Har Taraf"	Anu Malik	Sayeed Quadri	Kunal Ganjawala
Saaya	18	"Aye Meri Zindagi" (Female Version)	Anu Malik	Sayeed Quadri	
Armaan	19	"Tu Hi Bata Zindagi" (Female Version)	Shankar–Ehsaan–Loy	Javed Akhtar	
Xcuse Me	20	"Ishq Hua" (Version 1)	Sanjeev–Darshan	Abbas Katka	Shaan
Xcuse Me	21	"Ishq Hua" (Version 2)	Sanjeev–Darshan	Abbas Katka	Udit Narayan
Main Madhuri Dixit Banna Chahti Hoon	22	"The Duplicates Song"	Amar Mohile	Nitin Raikwar	Amit Khanduri, Saurav, Sudesh Bhonsle
Inteha	23	"Yun Hi Dil Ko Agar"	Anu Malik	Dev Kohli	Shaan
Inteha	24	"Dhalne Lagi Hai Raat" (Duet Version)	Anu Malik	Rahat Indori	Sonu Nigam
Inteha	25	"Deewana Dil"	Anu Malik	Dev Kohli	
Dhoop	26	"Subah Ke Dhoop Si"	Lalit Sen	Nida Fazli	Hariharan
Dhoop	27	"Ye Dhoop Ek Safar" (Female Version)	Lalit Sen	Nida Fazli	
Dhoop	28	"Teri Aankhon Se Hi" (Female Version)	Lalit Sen	Nida Fazli	
Jodi Kya Banayi Wah Wah Ramji	29	"Sun Mere Mahiya"	Anand Raj Anand	Dev Kohli	Sonu Nigam
Out of Control	30	"Tera Chand Sa Yeh Chehra"	Anand Raj Anand	Dev Kohli	Babul Supriyo
Zinda Dil	31	"Mera Saajan Aa Gaya"	Nadeem–Shravan	Sameer Anjaan	Mohammed Aslam
Munna Bhai M.B.B.S.	32	"Chann Chann"	Anu Malik	Rahat Indori	Vinod Rathod
LOC Kargil	33	"Pyaar Bhara Geet" (Duet Version)	Anu Malik	Javed Akhtar	Sonu Nigam

=== 2004 ===
Film	No	Song	Composer(s)	Writer(s)	Co-artist(s)
Shikaar	34	"Dil Kisi Ka Dil"	Anand Raj Anand	Dev Kohli	Sonu Nigam
Shukriya	35	"Ni Sohniye"	Devendra-Yogendra	Sameer Anjaan	Alka Yagnik, Udit Narayan, Sonu Nigam
Thoda Tum Badlo Thoda Hum	36	"Aanchal Hai Pawan"	Amar Mohile	Nida Fazli	Udit Narayan
Thoda Tum Badlo Thoda Hum	37	"Kalam Hath Mein Hai"	Amar Mohile	Nida Fazli	Sonu Nigam
Thoda Tum Badlo Thoda Hum	38	"Sabhi Aa Chuke Hain"	Amar Mohile	Nida Fazli	Sadhana Sargam, Sonu Nigam, Vaishali Sharma
Thoda Tum Badlo Thoda Hum	39	"Tauba Tauba"	Amar Mohile	Nida Fazli	Udit Narayan
Tum	40	"Dil To Udne Laga"	Himesh Reshammiya	Kumaar	
Paisa Vasool	41	"Yadon Mein"	Bapi–Tutul	Sandeep Nath	Shaan
Plan	42	"Kal Raat Se"	Anand Raj Anand	Praveen Bhardwaj	Kumar Sanu
Aetbaar	43	"Saansein Ghulne Lagi"	Rajesh Roshan	Chandrashekhar Rajit	Sonu Nigam
Khakee	44	"Wada Raha" (Ver l)	Ram Sampath	Sameer Anjaan	Arnab Chakraborty
Khakee	45	"Teri Baahon Mein Hum"	Ram Sampath	Sameer Anjaan	Sonu Nigam
Khakee	46	"Dil Dooba"	Ram Sampath	Sameer Anjaan	Sonu Nigam
Khakee	47	"Wada Raha" (Ver ll)	Ram Sampath	Sameer Anjaan	Udit Narayan
Khakee	48	"Dil Dooba" (Remix)	Ram Sampath	Sameer Anjaan	Sonu Nigam
Krishna Cottage	49	"Suna Suna"	Anu Malik	Neelesh Mishra	
Mission Mumbai	50	"Kala Jadoo"	Abhishek Ray	Abhishek Ray	Abhijeet Bhattacharya
Muskaan	51	"Woh Ho Tum" (Version 2)	Nikhil–Vinay	Sameer Anjaan	Sonu Nigam
Hawas	52	"Churaya Hai Teri Nazar"	Daboo Malik	Praveen Bhardwaj	Babul Supriyo
Hawas	53	"Tera Libaas" (Version 1)	Daboo Malik	Praveen Bhardwaj	Sonu Nigam
Hawas	54	"Tera Libaas" (Version 2)	Daboo Malik	Praveen Bhardwaj	Sonu Nigam
Main Hoon Na	55	"Main Hoon Na"	Anu Malik	Javed Akhtar	Sonu Nigam
Main Hoon Na	56	"Tumhe Jo Maine Dekha"	Anu Malik	Javed Akhtar	Abhijeet Bhattacharya
Main Hoon Na	57	"Gori Gori Gori Gori"	Anu Malik	Javed Akhtar	Anu Malik, KK, Sunidhi Chauhan
Police Force: An Inside Story	58	"Aahi Re Mahi"	Satish–Ajay	Nafees Alam	
Aan: Men at Work	59	"Koi Pyar Na Kare" (Sad Version)	Anu Malik	Sameer Anjaan	Sonu Nigam
Girlfriend	60	"Thodi Tumse Shararat"	Daboo Malik	Praveen Bhardwaj	Sonu Nigam
Girlfriend	61	"Tere Chehre Se" (Female Version)	Daboo Malik	Praveen Bhardwaj	
Chot- Aj Isko, Kal Tereko	62	"Tere Har Sapne Me"	Raju Singh	Sudhakar Sharma	Sonu Nigam
Sheen	63	"Aao Jannat Mein"	Nadeem–Shravan	Sameer Anjaan	Kumar Sanu, Mohammed Aziz, Neerja Pandit, Sonu Nigam, Udit Narayan
Garv	64	"Hum Tumko Nigahon Mein"	Sajid–Wajid	Shabbir Ahmed	Udit Narayan
Garv	65	"Soniye"	Sajid–Wajid	Jalees Sherwani	Sukhwinder Singh
Ishq Qayamat	66	"Yeh Thandi Hawayein"	Bobby Rehman	Nawab Arzoo	
Kaun Hai Jo Sapno Mein Aaya	67	"Agar Dil Kahe"	Nikhil–Vinay	Sameer	Sonu Nigam
Kuchh Kaha Aapne	68	"Kuch Kaha Aapne"	Sajid–Wajid	Jalees–Rashid	Sonu Nigam
Kuchh Kaha Aapne	69	"Kuch Kaha Aapne" (Sad Version)	Sajid–Wajid	Jalees–Rashid	Sonu Nigam
Kuchh Kaha Aapne	70	"Mere Mehboob Mein"	Sajid–Wajid	Jalees–Rashid	Neha Rajpal
Dhoom	71	"Shikdum"	Pritam	Sameer	Shaan
Phir Milenge	72	"Betab Dil Hai"	Nikhil–Vinay	Sameer	Sonu Nigam
Rakht	73	"Hadh Se Jyada Sanam"	Naresh Sharma	Deepak Sneh	Sonu Nigam
King of Bollywood	74	"Gaon Ki Gori"	Smoke	Sudhakar Sharma	Shaan
Tumsa Nahin Dekha: A Love Story	75	"Mujhe Tumse Mohabbat Hai"	Nadeem–Shravan	Sameer	Shaan
Tumsa Nahin Dekha: A Love Story	76	"Mujhe Tumse Mohabbat Hai" (Remix Version)	Nadeem–Shravan	Sameer	Shaan
Tumsa Nahin Dekha: A Love Story	77	"Bheed Mein" (Version 1)	Nadeem–Shravan	Sameer	Udit Narayan
Tumsa Nahin Dekha: A Love Story	78	"Bheed Mein" (Version 2)	Nadeem–Shravan	Sameer	Udit Narayan
Tumsa Nahin Dekha: A Love Story	79	"Maine Soch Liya"	Nadeem–Shravan	Sameer	Udit Narayan
Tumsa Nahin Dekha: A Love Story	80	"Woh Humse Khafa Hain"	Nadeem–Shravan	Sameer	Udit Narayan
Tumsa Nahin Dekha: A Love Story	81	"Yeh Dhuan Dhuan"	Nadeem–Shravan	Sameer	Roop Kumar Rathod
Tumsa Nahin Dekha: A Love Story	82	"Dhanak Ka Rang"	Nadeem–Shravan	Sameer	
Zakhmi Naagin	83	"Tumse Shuru Hain"	Syed Ahmed	Anjan Sagri	Suresh Wadkar
Zakhmi Naagin	84	"Tumse Shuru Hain" (Sad Version)	Syed Ahmed	Anjan Sagri	
Wajahh: A Reason to Kill	85	"Wada Yeh Kar Sathiya"	Anand Raj Anand	Praveen Bhardwaj	Anand Raj Anand
Wajahh: A Reason to Kill	86	"Sapna Koi"	Anand Raj Anand	Anand Raj Anand	
Dil Maange More	87	"Maine Chun Liya"	Himesh Reshammiya	Sameer	Udit Narayan
Rok Sako To Rok Lo	88	"Rok Sako To Rok Lo"	Jatin–Lalit	Prasoon Joshi	Babul Supriyo, Ishaan, Lalit Pandit, Shaan
Ab...Bas!	89	"Tere Chehre Pe"	Daboo Malik	Sameer	Udit Narayan
Musafir	90	"Ek Dil Ne"	Vishal–Shekhar	Dev Kohli	Kunal Ganjawala
Dil Bechara Pyaar Ka Maara	91	"Jane Kya Asar Tera Hua" (Female Version)	Nikhil–Vinay	Rajeshwar Mishra	
Dil Bechara Pyaar Ka Maara	92	"Jane Kya Asar Tera Hua" (Duet Version)	Nikhil–Vinay	Rajeshwar Mishra	Sonu Nigam
Dil Bechara Pyaar Ka Maara	93	"Chudion Ne"	Nikhil–Vinay	Praveen Bhardwaj	Priya Bhattacharya, Shaswati Phukan
Dil Bechara Pyaar Ka Maara	94	"Dil Bechara Pyaar Ka Maara" (Duet Version)	Nikhil–Vinay	Praveen Bhardwaj	Udit Narayan
Shart: The Challenge	95	"Dil To Awara Hai"	Anu Malik	Sameer	Sonu Nigam
Hanan	96	"Chan Chan"	Anu Malik	Rahat Indori	
Wife Hai To Life Hai	97	"Agar Hum Tume"	Durga-Natraj		Udit Narayan
Wife Hai To Life Hai	98	"Happy Birthday To You"	Durga-Natraj		Udit Narayan

=== 2005 ===
Film	No	Song	Composer(s)	Writer(s)	Co-artist(s)
Aashiq Banaya Aapne	99	"Aashiq Banaya Aapne"	Himesh Reshammiya	Sameer	Himesh Reshammiya
Bad Friend	100	"Kisson Mein"	Nikhil-Vinay	Sunil Jogi	Abhijeet Bhattacharya
Bad Friend	101	"Dhokha Hai"	Nikhil-Vinay	Sunil Jogi	Vinay
Bad Friend	102	"Mili Hai Kisise Nazar"	Nikhil-Vinay	Sunil Jogi	Sonu Nigam
Blackmail	103	"Tune Di Bekrari"	Himesh Reshammiya	Sameer	Shaan, Jayesh Gandhi
Blackmail	104	"Kaun Kehta Hai"	Himesh Reshammiya	Sameer	Udit Narayan
Bold	105	"Mujhe O Sanam"	Vinay Kapadia	Kuku Prabhash	Udit Narayan
Chaahat – Ek Nasha	106	"Chura Liya"	Anand Raj Anand	Praveen Bharadwaj	Babul Supriyo
Chaahat – Ek Nasha	107	"Dil Ki Baat"	Anand Raj Anand	Praveen Bharadwaj	Babul Supriyo, Sunidhi Chauhan
Chaahat – Ek Nasha	108	"Ishq Ki Raat"	Anand Raj Anand	Praveen Bharadwaj	Sonu Nigam, Sunidhi Chauhan
Chehraa	109	"Mausam Ki Izazat"	Nikhil - Vinay	Sameer	Kunal Ganjawala
Chehraa	110	"Hadh Se Jyada Sanam"	Naresh Sharma	Sameer	Sonu Nigam
Chehraa	111	"Teri Baahon Mein"	Ram Sampath	Sameer	Sonu Nigam
Chor Mandli	112	"Pyar Ne Tere"	Nirmal B. Pawar	Kumaar	Udit Narayan
Chor Mandli	113	"Abhi Nahi Jaana"	Nirmal B. Pawar	Kumaar	Udit Narayan
Classic – Dance of Love	114	"Saiyaji"	Bappi Lahiri	Sameer	
Dil Jo Bhi Kahey...	115	"Tu Nahi Thi Jab Yahan"	Shankar–Ehsaan–Loy	Javed Akhtar	Shankar Mahadevan, Sudesh Bhonsle
Dansh	116	"Saje Hain Sapnon Ke"	Fazal Qureshi	Nida Fazli	Kunal Ganjawala
Elaan	117	"Andarlu Mandarlu"	Anu Malik	Sameer	Sunidhi Chauhan, Sonu Nigam, Anu Malik
Elaan	118	"Andarlu Mandarlu" (Remix Version)	Anu Malik	Sameer	Sunidhi Chauhan, Sonu Nigam, Anu Malik
Fareb	119	"Pehle Se"	Anu Malik	Sayeed Quadri	Kunal Ganjawala
Fareb	120	"Pehle Se" (Remix Version)	Anu Malik	Sayeed Quadri	Kunal Ganjawala
Film Star	121	"Saaware Main Dhara Pyasi Re"	Jatin–Lalit	Sameer	
Fun – Can Be Dangerous Sometimes	122	"Jal Raha Hai Badan"	Sanjeev–Darshan	Nasir Faraaz	Kunal Ganjawala
Fun – Can Be Dangerous Sometimes	123	"Tum Paas Ho" (Female Version)	Sanjeev–Darshan	Nasir Faraaz	
Fun – Can Be Dangerous Sometimes	124	"Tum Paas Ho" (Duet Version)	Sanjeev–Darshan	Nasir Faraaz	Sonu Nigam
Gehraayee	125	"Masti Masti"	—N/a	—N/a	
Gehraayee	126	"Dil Hai To Dhadkega"	—N/a	—N/a	Udit Narayan
Gehraayee	127	"Mera Man Tera Man"	—N/a	—N/a	Udit Narayan
Hum Tum Aur Mom	128	"Pyar Agar Hai Koi Bhool" (Duet Version)	K. P. Udayabhanu	Shrinivas Baba	Saurabh Srivastava
Hum Tum Aur Mom	129	"Pyar Agar Hai Koi Bhool" (Female Version)	K. P. Udayabhanu	Shrinivas Baba	
Love in India - A Sage of Husband and Wife	130	"Tere Bina Jee Lagda Nahin"	—N/a	—N/a	Kailash Kher
Jackpot	132	"Mehbooba"	Dhrubajyoti Phukan	Sham Balkan	KK
Jalwa	133	"Masti Mein Doobi"	Dilip Sen	Shabbir Ahmed	Shaan
James	134	"Jaan Hai"	Nitin Raikwar	Nitin Raikwar	Sonu Nigam
Jurm	135	"Dil Dil"	Anu Malik	Rahat Indori	Udit Narayan
Kuchh Meetha Ho Jaye	136	"Bhool Jayenge Hum" (Version 1)	Himesh Reshammiya	Sameer	Udit Narayan
Kuchh Meetha Ho Jaye	137	"Bhool Jayenge Hum" (Version 2)	Himesh Reshammiya	Sameer	Udit Narayan
Kuchh Meetha Ho Jaye	138	"Kuchh Meetha Ho Jaye" (Version 1)	Himesh Reshammiya	Sameer	Udit Narayan, Jayesh Gandhi
Mahiya - Call of Love	139	"Kyun Chuniri Sarake Rahon"	Shekar Sharma	Sudhakar Sharma	Udit Narayan
Mahiya - Call of Love	140	"Mahiya Mahi Ve O Mahiya"	Shekar Sharma	Sudhakar Sharma	Udit Narayan
Mahiya - Call of Love	141	"Milne Ke Baad Jane Ka Naam"	Shekar Sharma	Sudhakar Sharma	Prem Prakash
Main Aisa Hi Hoon	142	"Papa Mere Papa"	Himesh Reshammiya	Sameer	Baby Aparna, Sonu Nigam
Main, Meri Patni Aur Woh	143	"Doob Jaana Re"	Rajendra Shiv	Rocky Khanna	Sonu Nigam
Men Not Allowed	144	"Dil Ki Seedhi Labmi Sadak"	Sanjeev Srivastava	Shaheen Iqbal	Sonu Kakkar
Meri Jung (Dubbed)	145	"Holi Holi Holi"	Devi Sri Prasad	P. K. Mishra	Vinod Rathod
Meri Jung (Dubbed)	146	"Karlo Thoda Pyar"	Devi Sri Prasad	P. K. Mishra	Udit Narayan
Naam Gum Jaayega	147	"Hai Sama Pyar Ka"	Anand–Milind	Praveen Bharadwaj	Udit Narayan
Nazar	148	"Mohabbat Zindagi Hai"	Anu Malik	—N/a	
Nishaan - The Target	149	"Saawan Ka Mahina"	Jeet Gannguli	Shyam Anuragi	
Paheli	150	"Dheere Jalna"	M. M. Keeravani	Gulzar	Sonu Nigam
Paheli	151	"Kangna Re"	M. M. Keeravani	Gulzar	Madhushree, Bela Shende, Kalapini Komakali, Sonu Nigam
Paheli	152	"Minnat Kare"	M. M. Keeravani	Gulzar	Madhushree, Bela Shende
Pyaar Mein Twist	153	"Do Dil" (Duet Version)	Jatin–Lalit	Sameer	Babul Supriyo
Rog	154	"Guzar Na Jaye" (Female Version)	M. M. Keeravani	Neelesh Misra	
Rog	155	"Guzar Na Jaye" (Duet Version)	M. M. Keeravani	Neelesh Misra	KK
Revati	156	"Mil Gayee Khwaab Ki Manzil"	Jatin–Lalit	Farooq A. Siddiqui	
Sanam Hum Aapke Hain	157	"Sau Bar Dhadakta Hai Dil"	Manoj - Vijay	Murari Kishan	Udit Narayan
Sauda - The Deal	158	"Jism Se"	Anand–Milind	Praveen Bharadwaj	
Shaadi No. 1	159	"God Promise Dil Dhola"	Anu Malik	Sameer	Rahul Vaidya
Shabd	160	"Bolo To"	Vishal–Shekhar	Irshad Kamil	Sonu Nigam, Sanjay Dutt
Shabnam Mausi	161	"Thoda Thahar"	Mani Shankar	Sujeet Chaubey	Udit Narayan
Sheesha	162	"Mujhe Jeena Sikha Do Na"	Sen Brothers	Nida Fazli	Kunal Ganjawala
Silsiilay	163	"Ahista Ahista"	Himesh Reshammiya	Sameer	Sonu Nigam, Jayesh Gandhi
Sitam	164	"Pyar Tumko Hi Kiya Hai"	Nikhil-Vinay	Kamaal Rashid Khan	Sonu Nigam
Sitam	165	"Sharmila Ho Sharmila" (Duet Version)	Nikhil-Vinay	Kamaal Rashid Khan	Sonu Nigam
Tezaab – The Acid of Love	166	"Kaash Yeh Pyar Na Hota"(Female)	Roop Kumar Rathod	Shakeel Azmi	
Time Pass	167	"Koi Nahi, Tere Mere"	Sunil Jha	Sunil Jha	Kunal Ganjawala
Time Pass	168	"Koi Bachao Mujhe"	Sunil Jha	Sunil Jha	Vinod Rathod
Topless	169	"Rang Mein Aaj"	Bappi Lahiri	Minu Singh	Kunal Ganjawala
Vaah! Life Ho Toh Aisi!	170	"Pyar Mein Tere"	Himesh Reshammiya	Sameer	Sonu Nigam
Vaah! Life Ho Toh Aisi!	171	"Pyaar Mein Tere" (Club Mix)	Himesh Reshammiya	Sameer	Sonu Nigam
Vaah! Life Ho Toh Aisi!	172	"Chahenge Tumhe"	Himesh Reshammiya	Sameer	Udit Narayan
Vishwas	173	"Nikla Hai Chand Zulfon Se"	Bappi Lahiri	—N/a	Udit Narayan
Vishwas	174	"Allah Teri Kudrat Allah Teri Shaan"	Bappi Lahiri	—N/a	Harvinder Singh
Yakeen	175	"Tu Hi"	Himesh Reshammiya	Sameer	Sonu Nigam
Zameer	176	"Dil Ke Badle Dil To"	Nikhil-Vinay	Praveen Bharadwaj	Babul Supriyo
Zeher	177	"Agar Tum Mil Jao"	Nashad (Recreated by Anu Malik)	Tasleem Fazli (Additional by Sayeed Quadri)	Udit Narayan
Zeher	178	"Jaane Ja Jaane Ja"	Roop Kumar Rathod	Shakeel Azmi	Udit Narayan
Hum Dum	179	"Humdum"	Sujeet–Rajesh	Shaheen Iqbal, Surendra Mishra	Sonu Nigam
Hum Dum	180	"Tanhaiya"(Female)	Sujeet–Rajesh	Shaheen Iqbal, Surendra Mishra	
Tango Charlie	181	"Ek Diwani Ladki"	Anand Raj Anand	Anand Raj Anand	Shaan
Tango Charlie	182	"Dheere Dheere"	Anand Raj Anand	Anand Raj Anand	Sonu Nigam
Mumbai Xpress	183	"Aila Re"	Ilaiyaraaja	Dev Kohli	KK, Shaan, Sonu Nigam, Sunidhi Chauhan
Mumbai Xpress	184	"Pyaar Chahiye" (Version 1)	Ilaiyaraaja	Dev Kohli	Shaan, Sonu Nigam
Parineeta	185	"Piyu Bole"	Shantanu Moitra	Swanand Kirkire	Sonu Nigam
Parineeta	186	"Kasto Mazza"	Shantanu Moitra	Swanand Kirkire	Sonu Nigam
Parineeta	187	"Hui Main Parineeta"	Shantanu Moitra	Swanand Kirkire	Sonu Nigam
Parineeta	188	"Soona Man Ka Aangan"	Shantanu Moitra	Swanand Kirkire	Sonu Nigam
Saathi: The Companion	189	"Tumko Hum Is Kadar"	Nikhil–Vinay	Faaiz Anwar	Kumar Sanu
Saathi: The Companion	190	"Tumse Dil Kya Laga Liya" (Version 2)	Nikhil–Vinay	Faaiz Anwar	Roop Kumar Rathod, Sanjeev
Mazaa Mazaa	191	"Mazaa Mazaa"	Arun Daga	Praveen Bhardwaj	
Mazaa Mazaa	192	"Dil Mein Kyon"	Arun Daga	Praveen Bhardwaj	Arun Daga
Yahaan	193	"Naam Adaa Likhna"	Shantanu Moitra	Gulzar	Shaan
Yahaan	194	"Urzu Urzu Durkut"	Shantanu Moitra	Gulzar	
Yahaan	195	"Mele Chaliyan"	Shantanu Moitra	Gulzar	
Yahaan	196	"Mele Chaliyan" (Remix Version)	Shantanu Moitra	Gulzar	
Yahaan	197	"Naam Adaa Likhna" (Remix Version)	Shantanu Moitra	Gulzar	Shaan
Chocolate	198	"Zahreeli Raatein" (Duet Version)	Pritam	Praveen Bhardwaj	KK
Kasak	199	"Saansein Madham Hai"	M. M. Keeravani	Sameer	
Rain	200	"Badaloon Ki Ad Le Le"	Satish–Ajay	Praveen Bhardwaj	Udit Narayan
U, Bomsi n Me	201	"Aankhon Mein"	Deepak Pandit	Manoj Muntashir	Sonu Nigam
U, Bomsi n Me	202	"Halki Halki"(Female)	Deepak Pandit	Manoj Muntashir	
U, Bomsi n Me	203	"Tu Kahan Kho Gaya"	Deepak Pandit	Manoj Muntashir	
Mastaani	204	"Jaan E Jigar"	Anand–Milind	Anwar Sagar	Abhijeet Bhattacharya
Nigehbaan	205	"Shaayar Shaayar"	Himesh Reshammiya		Udit Narayan
Ssukh	206	"Dar Kahe Ko Re"	Kamini Khanna, Nirmal Pawar		Udit Narayan

=== 2006 ===
Film	No	Song	Composer(s)	Writer(s)	Co-artist(s)
Aryan: Unbreakable	207	"Janeman"	Anand Raj Anand	Anand Raj Anand	Sonu Nigam
Aryan: Unbreakable	208	"Rab Ne Mere"	Anand Raj Anand	Anand Raj Anand	Kunal Ganjawala
Aryan: Unbreakable	209	"Its Beautiful Day"	Anand Raj Anand	Kumaar	Hamza
Baabul	210	"Keh Raha Hai"	Aadesh Shrivastava	Sameer	Sonu Nigam
Sun Zarra	211	"Dil Ki Sun Zarra"	Sandesh Shandilya	Anil Pandey	Amit Sana
Dahek	212	"Tip Tap Toop"	Debjit Bera	Kunal Bose	
With Love Tumhara	213	"Dheere Dheere" (Female Version)	Sudeep Banerjee	Nazeer Akbarabadi, Vicky Nagar, Sudeep Banerjee	
With Love Tumhara	214	"Kyun Ho Khafa"	Sudeep Banerjee	Nazeer Akbarabadi, Vicky Nagar, Sudeep Banerjee	
Rehguzar	215	"Woh Chand Pe Titli"	Aadesh Shrivastava	Nusrat Badr	Udit Narayan
Vivah	216	"Mujhe Haq Hai"	Ravindra Jain	Ravindra Jain	Udit Narayan
Vivah	217	"Do Anjaane Ajnabi"	Ravindra Jain	Ravindra Jain	Udit Narayan
Vivah	218	"Milan Abhi Aadha Adhura Hai"	Ravindra Jain	Ravindra Jain	Udit Narayan
Vivah	219	"Hamari Shaadi Mein"	Ravindra Jain	Ravindra Jain	Babul Supriyo
Vivah	220	"O Jiji"	Ravindra Jain	Ravindra Jain	Pamela Jain
Vivah	221	"Savaiyaa" (Raadhey Krishn Ki Jyoti)"	Ravindra Jain	Ravindra Jain	
Jaana - Let's Fall In Love	222	"Let's Fall In Love"	Abbas Jelani	Shahrukh Sultan	Shaan
Iqraar by Chance	223	"Ek Baari Aja"	Sandesh Shandilya	Mehboob Kotwal	Udit Narayan
Iqraar by Chance	224	"Teri In Aadaon Ne"	Sandesh Shandilya	Mehboob Kotwal	Vijay Prakash
Woh Lamhe	225	"So Jaoon Main" (Female Version)	Roop Kumar Rathod	Sayeed Quadri	
Dor	226	"Imaan Ka Asar"	Salim–Sulaiman	Mir Ali Husain	Sunidhi Chauhan
Kachchi Sadak	227	"Ek Tumse Baat"	Uttam Singh	Dr. Prabha Thakur	
Kachchi Sadak	228	"Ek Tumse Baat" (Sad Version)	Uttam Singh	Dr. Prabha Thakur	
Naksha	229	"Jat Yamla"	Pritam	Sameer	Sonu Nigam
Naksha	230	"Jat Yamla" (Remix Version)	Pritam	Sameer	Sonu Nigam
Jaane Hoga Kya	231	"Kuchh To Hua Hai"	Nikhil-Vinay	Sameer	Abhijeet Bhattacharya
Lage Raho Munna Bhai	232	"Pal Pal Har Pal"	Shantanu Moitra	Swanand Kirkire	Sonu Nigam
Lage Raho Munna Bhai	233	"Bande Mein Tha Dum Vande Mataram"	Shantanu Moitra	Swanand Kirkire, Vidhu Vinod Chopra	Sonu Nigam, Pranab Biswas
Anthony Kaun Hai?	234	"Tune Mera Chain Vain Le Liya"	Himesh Reshammiya	Sameer	Kunal Ganjawala
Anthony Kaun Hai?	235	"Tune Mera Chain Vain Le Liya" (Female Version)	Himesh Reshammiya	Sameer	Kunal Ganjawala
Omkara	236	"O Saathi Re"	Vishal Bhardwaj	Gulzar	Vishal Bhardwaj
The Killer	237	"O Sanam"	Sajid–Wajid	Jalees Sherwani	KK
The Killer	238	"Teri Yaadon Mein"	Sajid–Wajid	Jalees Sherwani	KK
The Killer	239	"Teri Yadoon Mein" (Female Version)	Sajid–Wajid	Jalees Sherwani	KK
Krrish	240	"Pyaar Ki Ek Kahani"	Rajesh Roshan	Ibrahim `Ashk'	Sonu Nigam
Krrish	241	"Koi Tumsa Nahin"	Rajesh Roshan	Nasir Faraaz	Sonu Nigam
Krrish	242	"Big Band Mix"	Rajesh Roshan	Nasir Faraaz	Sonu Nigam
Krrish	243	"Chori Chori Chupke Chupke"	Rajesh Roshan	Nasir Faraaz	Udit Narayan
Chup Chup Ke	244	"Tumhi Se"	Himesh Reshammiya	Sameer	Vijay Yesudas
Ankahee	245	"Aa Paas Aa"	Pritam	Sameer	
Ankahee	246	"Ek Pal Ke Liye" (Female Version)	Pritam	Amitabh Verma	
Mirza Sahiba	247	"Ghungroo"	Amar Haldipur	Sukhjinder Nizzer	
Saawan... The Love Season	248	"Mere Dil Ko Dil Ki Dhadkan Ko"	Aadesh Shrivastava	Saawan Kumar Tak	Shaan
Banaras - A Mystic Love Story	249	"Rang Dalo"	Himesh Reshammiya	Sameer	Sonu Nigam
Banaras - A Mystic Love Story	250	"Purab Se"	Himesh Reshammiya	Sameer	
Chand Ke Paar Chalo	251	"Iss Dil Ka Bharosa Kya"	Vishnu Narayan	Rishi Azad	Kumar Sanu, Aftab Hasmi Sabri
Malamaal Weekly	252	"Hansani O Meri Hansani"	Uttankk V. Vorra	Nitin Raikwar	Javed Ali
Malamaal Weekly	253	"Hansani O Meri Hansani" (Remix Version)	Uttankk V. Vorra	Nitin Raikwar	Javed Ali
Fight Club – Members Only	254	"Bolo Na Tum Zaraa"	Pritam	Neelesh Misra	Shaan
Fight Club – Members Only	255	"Bolo Na Tum Zaraa" (Remix Version)	Pritam	Neelesh Misra	Shaan
Rafta Rafta – The Speed	256	"Rafta Rafta Tumse Pyar"	Dilip Sen–Sameer Sen	Nawab Arzoo	Udit Narayan
Aisa Kyon Hota Hai?	257	"O Yaara"	Tauseef Akhtar	Payam Sayeedi	Sonu Nigam
Aisa Kyon Hota Hai?	258	"Aisa Kyon Hota Hai"	Tauseef Akhtar	Payam Sayeedi	
Holiday	259	"Aashiyaan"	Ranjit Barot	Mehboob Kotwal	Ranjit Barot
Holiday	260	"Aashiyaan" (Remix Version)	Ranjit Barot	Mehboob Kotwal	Ranjit Barot
Holiday	261	"Khawaahishon Se"	Ranjit Barot	Neelesh Misra	Kunal Ganjawala
Holiday	262	"Neele Neele"	Ranjit Barot	Neelesh Misra	Vijay Prakash
Holiday	263	"Tu Hai Bhatakta Jugnu Koi"	Ranjit Barot	Neelesh Misra	
Jawani Diwani: A Youthful Joyride	264	"Yaad Teri Yaad"	Sajid–Wajid	Shabbir Ahmed	Abhijeet Sawant
Manoranjan	265	"Saat Samundar"	Nayab Raja	Zahir Anwar	Kalpana
Manoranjan	266	"Saiyyan Ki Baiyyan Main"	Nayab Raja	Zahir Anwar	Kalpana
Aparichit (Dubbed)	267	"Chori Hai"	Harris Jayaraj	Mehboob Kotwal	KK
Mr. Khujli	268	"Lage Pyaas Mujhe"	Deepak Pandit	Anwar Khan	Kunal Ganjawala
Mr. Khujli	269	"Pyar Ne Tere"	Deepak Pandit	Anwar Khan	Udit Narayan
Mr. Khujli	270	"Abhi Nahi Jana"	Deepak Pandit	Anwar Khan	Udit Narayan
Yun Hota Toh Kya Hota	271	"Yadon Mein"	Viju Shah	Sameer	Shaan
Tujhko Pukare	272	"Nazar Mila Ke"	Gnyaneshwar Dubey	Vimal Kashyap	Udit Narayan
Tujhko Pukare	273	"Mehndi Rachao Ri Sakhi"	Gnyaneshwar Dubey	Vimal Kashyap	Varsha Srivastava
Tujhko Pukare	274	"Sanam Hum Tumse"	Gnyaneshwar Dubey	Abhiraaj	Udit Narayan
Rosy	275	"Pyar Me Hadh Se Gujarne Ki"	Afsar Sajid	Anjan Sagri	Babul Supriyo
Madhubaala	276	"Kahe Badra Tu Barse" (Duet Version)	Bapi–Tutul	Sandeep Nath	Ustad Sultan Khan
Madhubaala	277	"Kahe Badra Tu Barse" (Female Version)	Bapi–Tutul	Sandeep Nath	
Madhubaala	278	"Dur Se Na Husn Ko"	Bapi–Tutul	Sandeep Nath	
Ishq Na Karna	279	"Aaja Sanam Mujhko Bahon Mein"	Nazakat–Shujat	Shabbir Ahmed, Raj Inder Raj, Usman Bastavi	
Ishq Na Karna	280	"O Jaanam O Jaanam"	Nazakat–Shujat	Shabbir Ahmed, Raj Inder Raj, Usman Bastavi	Kumar Sanu
Jaadu Sa Chal Gaya	281	"Aaj Dil Mein Tere"	Nikhil–Vinay	Vinay Tiwari	Vinod Rathod
Jaadu Sa Chal Gaya	282	"Jaadu Sa Chal Gaya"	Nikhil–Vinay	Vinay Tiwari	Vinay Tiwari
Provoked	283	"Alive" (Hindi Version)	A. R. Rahman	Mayur Puri	
The Real Dream Girls	284	"Hum Kaun Hai Tumhare"	Shivam–Farhaan	Anjan Sagri	Shaan
Shiva	285	"Dheemi Dheemi"	Ilaiyaraaja	Dev Kohli	
Shiva	286	"Saara Yeh Aalam"	Ilaiyaraaja	Dev Kohli	Roop Kumar Rathod
Bipasha: The Black Beauty	287	"Teri Baahon Mein"	Saurabh Mukherjee	Raj Inder Raj	Javed Ali
Dil Se Pooch... Kidhar Jaana Hai	288	"Dhoop Kajli"	Aadesh Shrivastava	Nida Fazli	
Bhagam Bhag	289	"Tere Bin" (Reprise Version)	Pritam	Sameer	Kunal Ganjawala
Yehi Hai U Turn	290	"Pagal Dil Yeh Bechain Hai"	Manoj Santoshi, Sangeeta Trivedi	Ravi Chopra, Sajan Agarwal	Mohammad Salamat
We R Friends	291	"Chedo Na Sanam"	Anand–Milind	Jalees Sherwani	Udit Narayan
Ek Se Mera Kya Hoga	292	"Najar Jo Ladti Hai"	Gunvant Sharma		Kunal Ganjawala

=== 2007 ===
Film	No	Song	Composer(s)	Writer(s)	Co-artist(s)
Showbiz	293	"Kash Ek Din Aisa Bhi Aaye"	Lalit Pandit	Sayeed Quadri	Shaan
Showbiz	294	"Meri Ibtada"	Lalit Pandit	Sayeed Quadri	
Welcome	295	"Hoth Rasiley"	Anand Raj Anand	Ibrahim `Ashk'	Shankar Mahadevan, Anand Raj Anand
Strangers	296	"Baat Kehne Ko"	Vinay Tiwari	Javed Akhtar	Sonu Nigam
Khoya Khoya Chand	297	"Chale Aao Saiyan"	Shantanu Moitra	Swanand Kirkire	
Khoya Khoya Chand	298	"Sakhi Piya"	Shantanu Moitra	Swanand Kirkire	Pranab Biswas
Khoya Khoya Chand	299	"Thirak Thirak"	Shantanu Moitra	Swanand Kirkire	Sonu Nigam
Aaja Nachle	300	"Ishq Hua"	Salim–Sulaiman	Jaideep Sahni	Sonu Nigam
Aaja Nachle	301	"Is Pal"	Salim–Sulaiman	Piyush Mishra	Sonu Nigam
Aaja Nachle	302	"Koi Patthar Se Na Maare"	Salim–Sulaiman	Piyush Mishra	Sonu Nigam, Sunidhi Chauhan
Om Shanti Om	303	"Deewangi Deewangi"	Vishal–Shekhar	Javed Akhtar	Shaan, Udit Narayan, Sunidhi Chauhan, Rahul Saxena
Om Shanti Om	304	"Deewangi Deewangi" (Rainbow Mix)	Vishal–Shekhar	Javed Akhtar	Shaan, Udit Narayan, Sunidhi Chauhan, Rahul Saxena
Om Shanti Om	305	"Main Agar Kahoon"	Vishal–Shekhar	Javed Akhtar	Sonu Nigam
Om Shanti Om	306	"Dhoom Taana"	Vishal–Shekhar	Javed Akhtar	Abhijeet Bhattacharya
Om Shanti Om	307	"Om Shanti Om" (Medley Mix)	Vishal–Shekhar	Javed Akhtar	Sukhwinder Singh, Caralisa Monteiro, Nisha, Marianne, Shaan, Udit Narayan, Sunidhi Chauhan, Rahul Saxena, Abhijeet Bhattacharya
Mumbai Salsa	308	"Pyar Se" (Version 1)	Adnan Sami	Sameer	Shaan
Jab We Met	309	"Yeh Ishq Haye"	Pritam	Irshad Kamil	
Jab We Met	310	"Yeh Ishq Haye" (Remix Version)	Pritam	Irshad Kamil	Antara Mitra
Laaga Chunari Mein Daag	311	"Hum To Aise Hain"	Shantanu Moitra	Swanand Kirkire	Sunidhi Chauhan, Swanand Kirkire, Pranab Biswas
Laaga Chunari Mein Daag	312	"Ik Teekhi Teekhi Si Ladki"	Shantanu Moitra	Swanand Kirkire	KK
Laaga Chunari Mein Daag	313	"Kachchi Kaliyaan"	Shantanu Moitra	Swanand Kirkire	Sonu Nigam, Sunidhi Chauhan, KK
Bhool Bhulaiyaa	314	"Mere Dholna" (Aami Je Tomar)	Pritam	Sameer	M. G. Sreekumar
Chooriyan	315	"Kala Doriya"	Sardool Sikander	Debi Makhsoospuri, Khawaja Pervez	Rajesh Krishnan, Sardool Sikander
Dhol	316	"Dil Liya Dil Liya"	Pritam	Amitabh Verma	
Saawariya	317	"Masha-Allah"	Monty Sharma	Sameer	Kunal Ganjawala
Saawariya	318	"Jaan-E-Jaan"	Monty Sharma	Sameer	Kunal Ganjawala
Saawariya	319	"Sawar Gayi"	Monty Sharma	Sameer	
Saawariya	320	"Thode Badmaash"	Sanjay Leela Bhansali	Nusrat Badr	
Aag	321	"Holi"	Prasanna Shekhar	Sarim Momin	Sudesh Bhonsle, Shweta Pandit, Farhad Bhiwandiwala, Ravindra Upadhyay
Dhokha	322	"Kab Tujhe"	M. M. Keeravani	Sayeed Quadri	KK
Victoria No. 203	323	"Deedani"	Viju Shah	Chandrashekhar Rajit	Shaan
Victoria No. 203	324	"Thoa Sa Thero"	Viju Shah	Verma Malik	
Heyy Babyy	325	"Dholna"	Shankar–Ehsaan–Loy	Sameer	Sonu Nigam
Heyy Babyy	326	"Dholna" (Love Is In The Air Remix)	Shankar–Ehsaan–Loy	Sameer	Sonu Nigam
Dharm	327	"Piya Bole"(Female)	Debojyoti Mishra	Mrityunjay Kumar Singh	
Partner	328	"Dupatta Tera Nau Rang Da"	Sajid–Wajid	Shabbir Ahmed	Sonu Nigam, Kunal Ganjawala, Suzi Quatro
Aap Kaa Surroor	329	"Tera Mera Milna"	Himesh Reshammiya	Sameer	Himesh Reshammiya
Aap Kaa Surroor	330	"Tera Mera Milna" (Remix Version by DJ Akbar Sami)	Himesh Reshammiya	Sameer	Himesh Reshammiya
Aap Kaa Surroor	331	"Tera Mera Milna" (House Mix by DJ Akbar Sami)	Himesh Reshammiya	Sameer	Himesh Reshammiya
Aap Kaa Surroor	332	"Jhoot Nahi Bolna"	Himesh Reshammiya	Sameer	Himesh Reshammiya
Aap Kaa Surroor	333	"Jhoot Nahi Bolna" (Remix Version by DJ Akbar Sami)	Himesh Reshammiya	Sameer	Himesh Reshammiya
Ta Ra Rum Pum	334	"Ta Ra Rum Pum"(Female)	Vishal–Shekhar	Javed Akhtar	
Ta Ra Rum Pum	335	"Ab Toh Forever"	Vishal–Shekhar	Javed Akhtar	KK, Vishal Dadlani
Big Brother	336	"Piya"	Sandesh Shandilya	Anil Pandey	Kunal Ganjawala
Khanna & Iyer	337	"Rootho Naa"	Tabun Sutradhar	Rajesh Johri	Kunal Ganjawala
Khanna & Iyer	338	"Raasta Pyaar Ka"	Tabun Sutradhar	Sunil Jha	Kunal Ganjawala
Khanna & Iyer	339	"Raasta Pyaar Ka" (Remix Version)	Tabun Sutradhar	Sunil Jha	Kunal Ganjawala
Honeymoon Travels Pvt. Ltd.	340	"Jaane Hai Woh Kahan"	Vishal–Shekhar	Javed Akhtar	Shaan
Salaam-e-Ishq	341	"Salaam-E-Ishq"	Shankar–Ehsaan–Loy	Sameer	Sonu Nigam, Kunal Ganjawala, Sadhana Sargam, Shankar Mahadevan
Guru	342	"Barso Re"	A. R. Rahman	Gulzar	Uday Mazumdar
Game	343	"Chhua Mere Dil Ko" (Duet Version)	Bapi–Tutul	Sandeep Nath	Shaan
Cheeni Kum	344	"Cheeni Kum"	Ilaiyaraaja	Sameer	
Cheeni Kum	345	"Baatein Hawa" (Duet Version)	Ilaiyaraaja	Manoj Tapadia, Sameer	Amitabh Bachchan
Cheeni Kum	346	"Jaane Do Na"	Ilaiyaraaja	Sameer	
Cheeni Kum	347	"Baatein Hawa" (Female Version)	Ilaiyaraaja	Sameer	
Parveen Bobby	348	"Lagi Jo Lagan Tere Sang"	Dilip Sen–Sameer Sen	Sunil Jha	Udit Narayan
Apna Asmaan	349	"Chand Re"	Lesle Lewis	Mehboob Kotwal	

=== 2008 ===
Film	No	Song	Composer(s)	Writer(s)	Co-artist(s)
Rab Ne Bana Di Jodi	350	"Tujh Mein Rab Dikhta Hai" (Female Version)	Salim–Sulaiman	Jaideep Sahni	
Gumnaam – The Mystery	351	"Ishq Ne Kitna"	Nadeem–Shravan	Sameer	Adnan Sami
Gumnaam – The Mystery	352	"Mohabbat Se Zyada"	Nadeem–Shravan	Sameer	Udit Narayan
Dostana	353	"Khabar Nahi"	Vishal–Shekhar	Anvita Dutt Guptan	Vishal Dadlani, Amanat Ali
Deshdrohi	354	"Hum Karke Pyar"	Nikhil	Kamaal Rashid Khan	Sonu Nigam
Ek Vivaah... Aisa Bhi	355	"Mujhme Zinda Hai Woh"	Ravindra Jain	Ravindra Jain	Shaan
Ek Vivaah... Aisa Bhi	356	"Mujhme Zinda Hai Woh" (Part II)	Ravindra Jain	Ravindra Jain	Shaan
Ek Vivaah... Aisa Bhi	357	"Jhirmir Jhirmir Meha Barse"	Ravindra Jain	Ravindra Jain	Shaan
Ek Vivaah... Aisa Bhi	358	"Jhirmir Jhirmir Meha Barse" (Part II)	Ravindra Jain	Ravindra Jain	Shaan
Ek Vivaah... Aisa Bhi	359	"Dono Nibhayein Apna Dharam"	Ravindra Jain	Ravindra Jain	Shaan, Suresh Wadkar
Ek Vivaah... Aisa Bhi	360	"Sang Sang Rahenge Janam Janam"	Ravindra Jain	Ravindra Jain	Shaan, Suresh Wadkar
Ek Vivaah... Aisa Bhi	361	"Dekhe Akele Humne Solah Mele"	Ravindra Jain	Ravindra Jain	
Karzzzz	362	"Ek Haseena Thi"	Himesh Reshammiya	Sameer	Himesh Reshammiya
Cheenti Cheenti Bang Bang	363	"Jhil Mil"	Jeet Gannguli	Nida Fazli	Shaan
Kidnap	364	"Mausam"	Pritam	Mayur Puri	
Hari Puttar: A Comedy of Terrors	365	"Meri Yaadon Mein Hai Tu"	Aadesh Shrivastava, Guru Sharma	Kuku Prabhas	
Ru Ba Ru	366	"Tera Woh Pyar"	Sameeruddin	Shuja Haider	
Welcome to Sajjanpur	367	"Bheeni Bheeni Mehki Mehki"	Shantanu Moitra	Swanand Kirkire	KK
C Kkompany	368	"Jaane Kya"	Bappi Lahiri	Shabbir Ahmed	KK
God Tussi Great Ho	370	"Tumko Dekha"	Sajid–Wajid	Jalees Sherwani	Neeraj Shridhar
Bachna Ae Haseeno	371	"Aahista Aahista"	Vishal–Shekhar	Anvita Dutt Guptan	Lucky Ali
Singh Is Kinng	372	"Teri Ore"	Pritam	Mayur Puri	Rahat Fateh Ali Khan
Singh Is Kinng	373	"Teri Ore" (Lounge Remix)	Pritam	Mayur Puri	Rahat Fateh Ali Khan
Kismat Konnection	374	"Kahin Na Lage Mann"	Pritam	Sayeed Quadri	Mohit Chauhan
Kismat Konnection	375	"Kahin Na Lage Mann" (Remix Version)	Pritam	Sayeed Quadri	Mohit Chauhan
Thodi Life Thoda Magic	376	"Yeh Mast Hawa Jo"	Vinay Tiwari	Irshad Kamil	Sonu Nigam
Thoda Pyaar Thoda Magic	377	"Beetey Kal Se"	Shankar–Ehsaan–Loy	Prasoon Joshi	Sneha Suresh
De Taali	378	"Aaj Mein Boond Hoon"	Vishal–Shekhar	Vishal Dadlani	Shekhar Ravjiani
De Taali	379	"Aaj Mein Boond Hoon" (Female Version)	Vishal–Shekhar	Vishal Dadlani	
Khushboo	380	"Kyon Hai Mujhe Lagta"	Adnan Sami	Javed Akhtar	Adnan Sami
Khushboo	381	"Kyon Hai Mujhe Lagta" (Hip Hop Mix)	Adnan Sami	Javed Akhtar	Adnan Sami
Khushboo	382	"Kya Hai Sochati Tu"	Adnan Sami	Javed Akhtar	Shankar Mahadevan
Haal-e-Dil	383	"Haal-e-Dil"	Vishal Bhardwaj	Munna Dhiman	Rahat Fateh Ali Khan
Mere Baap Pehle Aap	384	"Maine Hawa Ke"	Vidyasagar	Sameer	Udit Narayan
Mere Baap Pehle Aap	385	"Maine Hawa Ke"(Reprise)	Vidyasagar	Sameer	Shaan
Dashavatar	386	"Dashavatar"	Anand Kurhekar	Sandeep Khare	Shankar Mahadevan
Dashavatar	387	"Raat Suhaani Mast Chandni"	Anand Kurhekar	Sandeep Khare	Shaan
Ghatothkach	388	"Main Yahan Tu Wahaan"	Singeetam Srinivasa Rao	Sameer	Shaan
Pranali	389	"Sakhiyaan"	Kailash Kher	Anil Pandey	Sunidhi Chauhan, Richa Sharma, Mahalakshmi Iyer
Sirf	390	"Ghar Tera Ghar Mera"	Sohail Sen, Shibani Kashyap	Mehboob, Vipul Saini	Shaan
U Me Aur Hum	391	"U Me Aur Hum" (Female Version)	Vishal Bhardwaj	Munna Dhiman	
U Me Aur Hum	392	"Dil Dhakda Hai"	Vishal Bhardwaj	Munna Dhiman	Adnan Sami
U Me Aur Hum	393	"Jee Le"	Vishal Bhardwaj	Munna Dhiman	Adnan Sami
Black & White	394	"Main Chali"	Sukhwinder Singh	Ibrahim `Ashk'	
Memsahab	395	"Qatil Haseena Hoon"	Murlidhar Alia	Ibrahim `Ashk'	
Chamku	396	"Aaja Milke"	Monty Sharma	Sameer	Shail Hada
Pehli Nazar Ka Pyaar	397	"Pehli Nazar Ka Pyaar Hai"	Ali Ghani	Nawab Arzoo, Shakeel Azmi	Shaan
Pehli Nazar Ka Pyaar	398	"Dil Ki Betaabiyon Ko"	Ali Ghani	Nawab Arzoo, Shakeel Azmi	Kumar Sanu
Yuvvraaj	399	"Tu Meri Dost Hain"	A. R. Rahman	Gulzar	Benny Dayal, A. R. Rahman
Manthan: Ek Kashmakash	400	"Yeh Zameen Roshani Se "	Ashish-Prakash	Tanveer Ghazi	Shaan
Ishaara – A Dangerous Mission	401	"Kar Le Tu Pyar Yar"	Dilip Sen	Ibrahim `Ashk'	Kumar Sanu
Ghajini	402	"Kaise Mujhe"	A. R. Rahman	Prasoon Joshi	Benny Dayal
Ghajini	403	"Latoo"	A. R. Rahman	Prasoon Joshi	Pravin Mani
Meeting Se Meeting Tak	404	"Jab Pyar Ho"	Mithoon	Sayeed Quadri	Shaan
Meeting Se Meeting Tak	405	"Aaj Nacho"	Mithoon	Sayeed Quadri	Sukhwinder Singh, Mohit Chauhan

=== 2009 ===
Film	No	Song	Composer(s)	Writer(s)	Co-artist(s)
3 Idiots	406	"Zoobi Doobi"	Shantanu Moitra	Swanand Kirkire	Sonu Nigam
3 Idiots	407	"Zoobi Doobi" (Remix Version)	Shantanu Moitra	Swanand Kirkire	Sonu Nigam
Kurbaan	408	"Shukran Allah"	Salim–Sulaiman	Niranjan Iyengar	Sonu Nigam, Salim Merchant
The Hero – Abhimanyu	409	"Chunariya Malmal Ki"	Farid Sabri	Sudhakar Sharma	Udit Narayan
Marega Salaa	410	"Aankhein Tumhari"	Daboo Malik	Praveen Bharadwaj	Sonu Nigam
Aladin	411	"Ore Saawariya"	Vishal–Shekhar	Vishal Dadlani	Amitabh Bachchan, Sudesh Bhonsle, Shaan
Aladin	412	"Ore Saawariya" (Remix Version)	Vishal–Shekhar	Vishal Dadlani	Amitabh Bachchan, Sudesh Bhonsle, Shaan
Main Aurr Mrs Khanna	413	"Don't Say Alvida"	Sajid–Wajid	Junaid Wasi	Sonu Nigam, Suzanne D'Mello
Main Aurr Mrs Khanna	414	"Don't Say Alvida" (Remix Version)	Sajid–Wajid	Junaid Wasi	Sonu Nigam, Suzanne D'Mello
Main Aurr Mrs Khanna	415	"Don't Say Alvida" (Sad Version)	Sajid–Wajid	Junaid Wasi	
Main Aurr Mrs Khanna	416	"Tum Ne Socha Ye Kaise"	Sajid–Wajid	Arun Bhairav	Wajid
Blue	417	"Aaj Dil Gustak Hai"	A. R. Rahman	Mayur Puri	Sukhwinder Singh
Blue	418	"Fiqrana"	A. R. Rahman	Rajat Arora	Vijay Prakash
Blue	419	"Rehnuma"	A. R. Rahman	Abbas Tyrewala	Sonu Nigam
Do Knot Disturb	420	"Mere Naal"	Nadeem–Shravan	Sameer	KK, Earl E.D, Nitika Kanwar
Do Knot Disturb	421	"Don't Ever Leave Me"	Nadeem–Shravan	Sameer	Shaan
Wanted	422	"Dil Leke Darde Dil"	Sajid–Wajid	Arun Bhairav	Shaan
Wanted	423	"Dil Leke Darde Dil" (Remix Version)	Sajid–Wajid	Arun Bhairav	Shaan
Dil Bole Hadippa!	424	"Ishq Hi Hai Rab"	Pritam	Jaideep Sahni	Sonu Nigam
Love Khichdi	425	"Zarasa Halkasa"	Pritam	Amitabh Verma	
Kisaan	426	"Humko Kehna Hai"	Daboo Malik	Panchhi Jalonvi	Shaan
Life Partner	427	"Teri Meri Yeh Zindagi"	Pritam	Javed Akhtar	Soham Chakraborty
Jashnn	428	"Nazrein Karam"	Sharib–Toshi	Kumaar	KK
Jashnn	429	"Nazrein Karam" (Remix Version)	Sharib–Toshi	Kumaar	KK
Jashnn	430	"Tere Bin"	Sandesh Shandilya	Neelesh Misra	Shaan
Shortkut	431	"Kyun Hota Hai Dil Deewana"	Shankar–Ehsaan–Loy	Javed Akhtar	Javed Ali
Morning Walk	432	"Bhor Bhayo"	Jeet Gannguli	Sanjeev Tiwari	Rashid Khan, Joi
Morning Walk	433	"Meethi Meethi Baatein"	Jeet Gannguli	Nida Fazli	Shaan
Morning Walk	434	"Dolna"	Jeet Gannguli	Nida Fazli	
Dekh Bhai Dekh	435	"Bawari Hoon Main"	Shadab Bhartiya	Rashid Firozabadi	
Maruti Mera Dosst	436	"Ayege Nindiya Ankheionke"	Kartik Shah	Subrat Sinha	KK
Kambakkht Ishq	437	"Kyun"	Anu Malik	Anvita Dutt Guptan	Shaan
Kambakkht Ishq	438	"Kyun" (Reprise)	Anu Malik	Anvita Dutt Guptan	
Kal Kissne Dekha	439	"Bin Tere Mar Jawan"	Sajid–Wajid	Sameer	
Kal Kissne Dekha	440	"Kal Kissne Dekha"	Sajid–Wajid	Sameer	Shaan
Kal Kissne Dekha	441	"Kal Kissne Dekha" (Club Mix Version)	Sajid–Wajid	Sameer	Shaan
Kal Kissne Dekha	442	"Aasmaan Jhuk Gaya"	Sajid–Wajid	Sameer	Shaan
Team - The Force	443	"Hamaara Haal"	Daboo Malik	Praveen Bharadwaj	
Team - The Force	444	"Kal Tak Toh"	Daboo Malik	Praveen Bharadwaj	Babul Supriyo
Detective Naani	445	"Dhadakta Dil"	Jolly Mukherjee, Romilla Mukherjee	Jolly Mukherjee, Romilla Mukherjee	Shaan
Detective Naani	446	"Dhadakta Dil" (Remix Version)	Jolly Mukherjee, Romilla Mukherjee	Jolly Mukherjee, Romilla Mukherjee	Shaan
Kisse Pyaar Karoon	447	"Sanam Sanam"	Daboo Malik	Shabbir Ahmed	Shaan
Kisse Pyaar Karoon	448	"Jahan Tak Ye Meri Nazar"	Daboo Malik	Anwar Sagar	Shaan
Kisse Pyaar Karoon	449	"Chunar Chunar"	Daboo Malik	Shabbir Ahmed	Rahul Vaidya
Mere Khwabon Mein Jo Aaye	450	"Pahle Toh Meri Inn Ankhon"	Lalit Pandit	Javed Akhtar	
Raaz: The Mystery Continues	451	"Soniyo"	Raju Singh	Kumaar	Sonu Nigam
Chandni Chowk to China	452	"Tera Naina"	Shankar–Ehsaan–Loy	Rajat Arora	Shankar Mahadevan
Phir Kabhi	453	"Bhai Re Palatke Jindagi"	Shantanu Moitra	Ajay Jhingran	Ajay Jhingran
Phir Kabhi	454	"Pal Har Har Pal"	Shantanu Moitra	Ajay Jhingran	Sonu Nigam
Delhi-6	455	"Bhor Bhaye"	A. R. Rahman	Prasoon Joshi	Ustad Bade Ghulam Ali Khan
Ek: The Power of One	456	"Tum Saath Ho"	Pritam	Shabbir Ahmed	Abhijeet Bhattacharya
Chal Chalein	457	"Shehar Hai Khoob Kya Hai"	Ilaiyaraaja	Piyush Mishra	Shaan, Krishna Beura
Chal Chalein	458	"Uff Are Tu Mirch Hai"	Ilaiyaraaja	Piyush Mishra	Shaan, Krishna Beura
Three: Love, Lies, Betrayal	459	"Tum Jo Ho Kareeb"	Chirantan Bhatt	Shakeel Azmi	
Fox	460	"Zindagi"	Monty Sharma	Sandeep Nath	Kunal Ganjawala
Radio	461	"Janeman Ek Naam Tumhara Lekar"	Himesh Reshammiya	Subrat Sinha	Himesh Reshammiya
Radio	462	"Koi Na Koi Chahe"	Himesh Reshammiya	Subrat Sinha	Himesh Reshammiya
Radio	463	"Teri Meri Dosti Ka Aasman"	Himesh Reshammiya	Subrat Sinha	Himesh Reshammiya
Radio	464	"Shaam Ho Chali Hai"	Himesh Reshammiya	Subrat Sinha	Himesh Reshammiya
Aaj Ka Naya Khiladi	465	"Doob Ja Yun Pyaar Mein"	Raghu Dixit	Anvita Dutt Guptan	

=== 2010 ===
Film	No	Song	Composer(s)	Writer(s)	Co-artist(s)
Isi Life Mein	466	"Isi Umar Mein"	Meet Bros	Manoj Muntashir	Mohit Chauhan, Dominique Cerejo
Isi Life Mein	467	"Ramji 24x7"	Meet Bros	Manoj Muntashir	Kavita Seth, Debojit Saha
Isi Life Mein	468	"LOL - Live Out Loud"	Meet Bros	Manoj Muntashir	Meet Bros, Suzanne D'Mello
Isi Life Mein	469	"Tere Pyar Mein"	Meet Bros	Manoj Muntashir	Kunal Ganjawala, Dominique Cerejo
Isi Life Mein	470	"Ramji 24x7" (Remix Version)	Meet Bros	Manoj Muntashir	Kavita Seth, Debojit Saha
Tees Maar Khan	471	"Badey Dilwala"	Vishal–Shekhar	Anvita Dutt Guptan	Sukhwinder Singh
Tees Maar Khan	472	"Badey Dilwala" (Remix Version)	Vishal–Shekhar	Anvita Dutt Guptan	Sukhwinder Singh
Tees Maar Khan	473	"Wallah Re Wallah"	Vishal–Shekhar	Anvita Dutt Guptan	Shekhar Ravjiani, Raja Hasan, Kamal Khan
Tees Maar Khan	474	"Wallah Re Wallah" (Remix Version)	Vishal–Shekhar	Anvita Dutt Guptan	
Diwangi Ne Had Kar Di	475	"Diwangi Ne Had Kar Di"	Sandesh Shandilya	Rashid Firozabadi	Kunal Ganjawala
Diwangi Ne Had Kar Di	476	"Nindo Me"	Sandesh Shandilya	Rashid Firozabadi	Sukhwinder Singh
Dunno Y... Na Jaane Kyon	477	"Dabi Dabi Kwahishien"	Nikhil	Satya Prakash	Shaan, Farhad Bhiwandiwala
Dunno Y... Na Jaane Kyon	478	"Dabi Dabi Kwahishien" (Duet Version)	Nikhil	Satya Prakash	Shaan
Dunno Y... Na Jaane Kyon	479	"Dabi Dabi Kwahishien" (Female Version)	Nikhil	Satya Prakash	
A Flat	480	"Pyar Itna Na Kar"	Bappi Lahiri	Virag Mishra	
Action Replayy	481	"O Bekhabar"	Pritam	Irshad Kamil	
Action Replayy	482	"Baki Main Bhool Gayi"	Pritam	Irshad Kamil	
Malik Ek	483	"De De Thoda Sa Pyaar"	Anup Jalota	Amit Khanna	
Musaa	484	"Janiya Teri Hansi Ada"	Eliyas	Ibrahim `Ashk'	Kunal Ganjawala
Jhootha Hi Sahi	485	"Cry Cry"	A. R. Rahman	Abbas Tyrewala	Rashid Ali
Jhootha Hi Sahi	486	"Pam Para"	A. R. Rahman	Abbas Tyrewala	
Ramayana: The Epic	487	"Tu Hi Tu Hai"	Shaarang Dev	Ramendra Mohan Tripathi	KK
Kajraare	488	"Tujhe Dekh Ke Armaan Jaage"	Himesh Reshammiya	Sameer	Himesh Reshammiya
Kajraare	489	"Teriyan Meriyan Chakh Mein"	Himesh Reshammiya	Sameer	Himesh Reshammiya
Robot (Dubbed)	490	"Pagal Anukan"	A. R. Rahman	Swanand Kirkire	Mohit Chauhan
Life Express	491	"Pyar Ka Namak"	Roop Kumar Rathod	Shakeel Azmi	Udit Narayan
Dabangg	492	"Tere Mast Mast Do Nain" (Version 2)	Sajid–Wajid	Faaiz Anwar	Rahat Fateh Ali Khan
Dabangg	493	"Chori Kiya Re Jiya"	Sajid–Wajid	Jalees Sherwani	Sonu Nigam
Aashayein	494	"Pal Mein Mila Jahan" (Female Version)	Salim–Sulaiman	Mir Ali Husain	
Kis Hudh Tak...	495	"Chori Chori"	Abid Shah	Abid Shah	Abhijeet Bhattacharya
Kis Hudh Tak...	496	"Chori Chori" (Indian Mix)	Abid Shah	Abid Shah	Abhijeet Bhattacharya
Milenge Milenge	497	"Milenge Milenge" (Version 2)	Himesh Reshammiya	Sameer	Himesh Reshammiya
Krantiveer - The Revolution	498	"Khuda Mere Khuda"	Sachin–Jigar	Sameer	KK
Mr. Singh Mrs. Mehta	499	"Barhaan Dil" (Female Version)	Ustaad Shujaat Hussain Khan	Amitabh Verma	
Mr. Singh Mrs. Mehta	500	"Behoshi Nasha Khushboo"	Ustaad Shujaat Hussain Khan	Amitabh Verma	Udit Narayan
Kushti	501	"Dangal"	Srinivas	Sameer	Srinivas
Do Dilon Ke Khel Mein	502	"Rang Dalunga Chunri" (Holi Song)	Daboo Malik	Nafees Alam	Udit Narayan, Dipak Giri, Shalini Srivastava
Chase	503	"Shaam Ki"	Vijay Verma	Manthan	Shaan
Chase	504	"Shaam Ki" (Lounge Mix)	Vijay Verma	Manthan	Shaan
Apartment	505	"Ghar Dil Mein"	Bappi Lahiri	Syed Gulrez	Javed Ali
Prince	506	"Tere Liye"	Sachin Gupta	Sameer	Atif Aslam
Prince	507	"Tere Liye" (Dance Mix)	Sachin Gupta	Sameer	Atif Aslam
Prince	508	"Tere Liye" (Hip Hop Mix)	Sachin Gupta	Sameer	Atif Aslam
Prince	509	"Prince Theme" (Mega Mix)	Sachin Gupta	Sameer	Atif Aslam, Alisha Chinai, Monali Thakur, Garima Jhingoon
Sadiyaan	510	"Jadu Nasha Ehsas Kya"	Adnan Sami	Sameer	Shaan
Sadiyaan	511	"Sargoshiyo Ke Kya Silsile Hai"	Adnan Sami	Sameer	Raja Hasan
Prem Kaa Game	512	"Magar Kuch To Hai"	Raju Singh	Javed Akhtar	Sonu Nigam
Well Done Abba	513	"Sandesa Sandesa"	Shantanu Moitra	Swanand Kirkire	Rupankar Bagchi
Na Ghar Ke Na Ghaat Ke	514	"Agar Hum Tum Ko"	Lalit Pandit	Mudassar Aziz	Neeraj Shridhar
Na Ghar Ke Na Ghaat Ke	515	"Agar Hum Tum Ko" (Remix Version)	Lalit Pandit	Mudassar Aziz	Neeraj Shridhar
Click	516	"Mehroom Hua Na Dil Kabhi"	Shamir Tandon	Shabbir Ahmed	Shaan
Phaans - Ek Jasoos Ki Kahani	517	"Kis Kis Bahane"	Dilip Sen	Sanjay Mishra	Shaan
Veer	518	"Salaam Aaya"	Sajid–Wajid	Gulzar	Roop Kumar Rathod, Suzanne D'Mello
Chance Pe Dance	519	"Pal Mein Hi"	Adnan Sami	Irfan Siddiqui	Soham Chakraborty
Dulha Mil Gaya	520	"Rang Diya Dil"	Lalit Pandit	Mudassar Aziz	
Dulha Mil Gaya	521	"Rang Diya Dil" (Sad Version)	Lalit Pandit	Mudassar Aziz	
My Name Is Khan	522	"Noor E Khuda"	Shankar–Ehsaan–Loy	Niranjan Iyengar	Adnan Sami, Shankar Mahadevan
Shaapit	523	"Ajnabi Hawaayein"	Chirantan Bhatt	Sameer	
Hum Tum Aur Ghost	524	"Dekho Raste Mein"	Shankar–Ehsaan–Loy	Javed Akhtar	KK
Hum Tum Aur Ghost	525	"Dekho Raste Mein" (Remix Version)	Shankar–Ehsaan–Loy	Javed Akhtar	KK, Arshad Warsi
I Hate Luv Storys	526	"Bahara"	Vishal–Shekhar	Kumaar	Sona Mohapatra
Antardwand	527	"Tanha Tanha" (Duet Version)	Bapi–Tutul	Amitabh Verma	Kailash Kher
Antardwand	528	"Tanha Tanha" (Female Version)	Bapi–Tutul	Amitabh Verma	
We Are Family	529	"Ankhon Mein Neendein"	Shankar–Ehsaan–Loy	Irshad Kamil	Rahat Fateh Ali Khan, Shankar Mahadevan
We Are Family	530	"Hamesha & Forever"	Shankar–Ehsaan–Loy	Irshad Kamil	Sonu Nigam
Aakrosh	531	"Sasural Munia Rato Ko Piya"	Pritam	Irshad Kamil	
Hisss	532	"Lagi Lagi Milan Dhun Lagi" (Version 1)	Anu Malik	Sameer	
Tera Kya Hoga Johnny	533	"Shehar Ki Rani"	Abhishek Ray	Sandeep Nath	
Band Baaja Baaraat	534	"Aadha Ishq"	Salim–Sulaiman	Amitabh Bhattacharya	Natalie Di Luccio
13 May Gulabi Nagar	535	"Aise Nahi Jiya Lage"	Lakshmi - Vasanth	Lakshmi Narayan	Javed Ali

=== 2011 ===
Film	No	Song	Composer(s)	Writer(s)	Co-artist(s)
Mausam	536	"Abhi Na Jao Chhod Kar"	Jaidev (Recreated By Pritam)	Sahir Ludhianvi	
Mausam	537	"Zara Si Mehndi Laga Do"	Pritam	Irshad Kamil	Sonu Nigam
Kya Yahi Sach Hai	538	"Ye Zindagi Sagar Ka Behta Sa Paani"	Santosh Anand	Santosh Anand	
Kya Yahi Sach Hai	539	"Voh Sunehare Din"	Nirmal Augastaya	Nirmal Augastaya	
Kya Yahi Sach Hai	540	"Udake Mujhko Ye Hawaien" (Version 1)	Nirmal Augastaya	Ibrahim `Ashk'	
Pappu Can't Dance Saala	541	"Saajana"	Malhar Patekar	Amitabh Bhattacharya, Saurabh Shukla	
Jo Hum Chahein	542	"Ishq Hothon Se"	Sachin Gupta	Kumaar	KK
Ye Stupid Pyar	543	"Stupid Pyar"	Vipin Patwa	Arafat Mehmood	
Lanka	544	"Sheet Leher"	Gaurav Dagaonkar	Seema Saini	
The Dirty Picture	545	"Ooh La La"	Vishal–Shekhar	Rajat Arora	Bappi Lahiri
The Dirty Picture	546	"Ooh La La" (Dhol Mix)	Vishal–Shekhar	Rajat Arora	Bappi Lahiri
The Dirty Picture	547	"Twinkle Twinkle"	Vishal–Shekhar	Rajat Arora	Rana Majumdar
Miley Naa Miley Hum	548	"Haan Yahi Pyaar Hai"	Sajid–Wajid	Javed Akhtar	Shaan
Tell Me O Kkhuda	549	"Nagma Koi Gunguna Ne Ka"	Pritam	Mayur Puri	
Force	550	"Main Chali"	Harris Jayaraj	Javed Akhtar	Naresh Iyer
Mod	551	"Tu Hi Tu"	Tapas Relia	Mir Ali Husain	Shivam Pathak
Mod	552	"Chand Pal Ke Hamsafar"	Tapas Relia	Mir Ali Husain	Shankar Mahadevan
Mod	553	"Aaj Main Ho Gayi Jawaan"	Tapas Relia	Mir Ali Husain	Hamsika Iyer, Ninad Kamat, Raghubir Yadav, Hrishikesh Kamerkar
Mod	554	"Aaj Main Ho Gayi Jawaan" (Remix Version)	Tapas Relia	Mir Ali Husain	Hamsika Iyer, Ninad Kamat, Raghubir Yadav, Hrishikesh Kamerkar
Love Breakups Zindagi	555	"Main Se Meena Se"	Rajesh Roshan (Recreated by Salim–Sulaiman)	Indeevar (Additional by Javed Akhtar)	Sonu Nigam
Love Breakups Zindagi	556	"Rab Rakha"	Salim–Sulaiman	Javed Akhtar	Sonu Nigam, Salim Merchant, Shrraddha Pandit
Chargesheet	557	"Bollywood Bollywood"	AD Boyz	Anant Joshi	Sunidhi Chauhan
Saheb, Biwi Aur Gangster	558	"Raat Mujhe"	Abhishek Ray	Sandeep Nath	
U R My Jaan	559	"Mein Zamein Pe Hu"	Sanjeev–Darshan	Sameer	
U R My Jaan	560	"Chand Wahi Hai"	Sanjeev–Darshan	Sameer	Javed Ali
Bodyguard	561	"Teri Meri"	Himesh Reshammiya	Shabbir Ahmed	Rahat Fateh Ali Khan
Bodyguard	562	"Teri Meri" (Reprise Version)	Himesh Reshammiya	Shabbir Ahmed	Rahat Fateh Ali Khan
Bodyguard	563	"Teri Meri" (Remix Version)	Himesh Reshammiya	Shabbir Ahmed	Rahat Fateh Ali Khan
Phhir	564	"Gumsum"	Raghav Sachar	Aditya Dhar	
I Am Kalam	565	"Chini Bhini"	Abhishek Ray	Manavendra	
Khap	566	"Deewanagi"	Annujj Kappoo	Yogesh	Shaan
Khap	567	"Ye Wahi To Hai Hasin Chehra"	Annujj Kappoo	Yogesh	Shaan
Khap	568	"Yeh Pyar Kaise Kab Ho Jaaye"	Annujj Kappoo	Yogesh	Shaan
Khap	569	"Es Pyar Ki Jadugari"	Annujj Kappoo	Yogesh	Shaan
Singham	570	"Saathiyaa"	Ajay–Atul	Swanand Kirkire	Ajay Gogavale
Singham	571	"Saathiyaa" (Remix Version)	Ajay–Atul	Swanand Kirkire	Ajay Gogavale
Kashmakash (Dubbed)	572	"Manwa"	Raja Narayan Deb, Sanjoy Das	Gulzar	
Kashmakash (Dubbed)	573	"Teri Seemayen"	Raja Narayan Deb, Sanjoy Das	Gulzar	
Love U...Mr. Kalakaar!	574	"Sarphira Sa Hai Dil"	Sandesh Shandilya	Manoj Muntashir	Neeraj Shridhar
Love U...Mr. Kalakaar!	575	"Bhoore Bhoore Badal"	Sandesh Shandilya	Manoj Muntashir	Kunal Ganjawala
Tum Hi To Ho	576	"Dil Ne Mere Dil Ne"	Anand–Milind	Ravi Chopra	Udit Narayan
Queens! Destiny Of Dance	577	"Hey-La-Mana"	Anurag Ware	Anvita Dutt Guptan, Raghu Nath	
Naughty @ 40	578	"Der Se Sahi Main"	Monty Sharma	Syed Gulrez	
Game	579	"Mehki Mehki"	Shankar–Ehsaan–Loy	Javed Akhtar	Kshitij Wagh
Game	580	"Mehki Mehki" (Remix Version)	Shankar–Ehsaan–Loy	Javed Akhtar	Kshitij Wagh
Satrangee Parachute	581	"Mere Bachche" (Lullaby)	Kaushik Dutta	Rajeev Barnwal	
Yamla Pagla Deewana	582	"Sau Baar"	Sandesh Shandilya	Irshad Kamil	Omer Nadeem
Shraddha: In The Name of God	583	"Aankho Ko Aankho Se"	Dinesh Arjuna	Daur Saifee	Udit Narayan
Shraddha: In The Name of God	584	"Tanha Tanha"	Dinesh Arjuna	Daur Saifee	Udit Narayan
Yeh Faasley	585	"Sach Kehna"	Deepak Pandit	Manoj Muntashir	Deepak Pandit, Sowmya Raoh
Yeh Faasley	586	"Sach Kehna" (New Mix)	Deepak Pandit	Manoj Muntashir	Deepak Pandit, Sowmya Raoh
Yeh Faasley	587	"Zara Sa Ansuna"	Deepak Pandit	Manoj Muntashir	
Yeh Faasley	588	"Zara Sa Ansuna" (New Mix)	Deepak Pandit	Manoj Muntashir	Deepak Pandit
42 Kms	589	"Aate Jaate"	Tubby-Parik	Shahab Allahabadi	Udit Narayan
Shor in the City	590	"Saibo"	Sachin–Jigar	Sameer	Tochi Raina
Shor in the City	591	"Saibo" (Remix Version)	Sachin–Jigar	Sameer	Tochi Raina
Iti Mrinalini (Dubbed)	592	"Ankahi Kahani"	Debojyoti Mishra	Srijit Mukherji	
Iti Mrinalini (Dubbed)	593	"Zaheree Neeli" (Female Version)	Debojyoti Mishra	Srijit Mukherji	
Aarakshan	594	"Achha Lagta Hai"	Shankar–Ehsaan–Loy	Prasoon Joshi	Mohit Chauhan, Neuman Pinto
Aarakshan	595	"Kaun Si Dor"	Shankar–Ehsaan–Loy	Prasoon Joshi	Chhannulal Mishra
Trishna	596	"Lagan Laagi"	Amit Trivedi	Shellee	Kavita Seth
Ek Main Ek Tum	597	"Dub Dub"	Bali Brahmabhatt	Ravi Chopra	Udit Narayan

=== 2012 ===
Film	No	Song	Composer(s)	Writer(s)	Co-artist(s)
Dabangg 2	598	"Dagabaaz Re"	Sajid–Wajid	Sameer	Rahat Fateh Ali Khan, Shadab Faridi
Dabangg 2	599	"Pandeyjee Seeti"	Sajid–Wajid	Jalees Sherwani	Mamta Sharma, Wajid
Dabangg 2	600	"Pandeyjee Seeti" (Remix Version)	Sajid–Wajid	Jalees Sherwani	Mamta Sharma, Wajid
Khiladi 786	601	"Balma"	Himesh Reshammiya	Sameer	Sreerama Chandra
Khiladi 786	602	"Balma" (Remix Version)	Himesh Reshammiya	Sameer	Sreerama Chandra
Khiladi 786	603	"Tu Hoor Pari"	Himesh Reshammiya	R Mehndi	Javed Ali, Chandrakala Singh, Harshdeep Kaur
Jab Tak Hai Jaan	604	"Saans"	A. R. Rahman	Gulzar	Mohit Chauhan
Jab Tak Hai Jaan	605	"Saans" (Reprise)	A. R. Rahman	Gulzar	
Student of the Year	606	"Radha"	Vishal–Shekhar	Anvita Dutt Guptan	Udit Narayan, Vishal Dadlani, Shekhar Ravjiani
Aiyyaa	607	"Mahek Bhi"	Amit Trivedi	Amitabh Bhattacharya	
OMG – Oh My God!	608	"Go Go Govinda"	Himesh Reshammiya	Shabbir Ahmed	Mika Singh
OMG – Oh My God!	609	"Go Go Govinda" (Reprise Version)	Himesh Reshammiya	Shabbir Ahmed	Aman Trikha
Barfi!	610	"Aashiyan"	Pritam	Swanand Kirkire	Nikhil Paul George
Raaz 3D	611	"Oh My Love"	Jeet Gannguli	Sanjay Masoom	Sonu Nigam
Raaz 3D	612	"Kya Raaz Hai"	Jeet Gannguli	Kumaar	Zubeen Garg
Raaz 3D	613	"Khayalon Mein"	Jeet Gannguli	Kumaar	
Chal Pichchur Banate Hain	614	"Bas Tu Hi"	Gaurav Dagaonkar	Seema Saini	Javed Ali
I M 24	615	"Chota Sa Sapna Hai Yeh"	Jatin Pandit	Saurabh Shukla	
Shirin Farhad Ki Toh Nikal Padi	616	"Khatti Meethi"	Jeet Gannguli	Amitabh Bhattacharya	
Shirin Farhad Ki Toh Nikal Padi	617	"Ishq Mein Tere Bina"	Jeet Gannguli	Amitabh Bhattacharya	KK
Ek Tha Tiger	618	"Mashallah"	Sajid–Wajid	Kausar Munir	Wajid
Ek Tha Tiger	619	"Mashallah" (Remix Version)	Sajid–Wajid	Kausar Munir	Wajid
Krishna Aur Kans	620	"Suno Suno Saanware Ki"	Shantanu Moitra	Swanand Kirkire	Pranab Kumar
Krishna Aur Kans	621	"Roon Ghoona Re"	Shantanu Moitra	Swanand Kirkire	Babul Supriyo
Yeh Jo Mohabbat Hai	622	"Pyar Karna Na Tha" (Female Version)	Anu Malik	Anand Bakshi	
Yeh Jo Mohabbat Hai	623	"Kyon? Kyon?"	Anu Malik	Faaiz Anwar	Shaan
Bol Bachchan	624	"Chalao Na Naino Se"	Himesh Reshammiya	Shabbir Ahmed	Himesh Reshammiya, Shabab Sabri
Bol Bachchan	625	"Chalao Na Naino Se" (Remix Version)	Himesh Reshammiya	Shabbir Ahmed	Himesh Reshammiya, Shabab Sabri
Bol Bachchan	626	"Nach Le Nach Le"	Ajay–Atul	Swanand Kirkire	Sukhwinder Singh
Bol Bachchan	627	"Nach Le Nach Le" (Remix Version)	Ajay–Atul	Swanand Kirkire	Sukhwinder Singh
Teri Meri Kahaani	628	"Humse Pyaar Karle Tu"	Sajid–Wajid	Prasoon Joshi	Wajid, Mika Singh, Aftab Hashim Sabri, Shabab Sabri
Teri Meri Kahaani	629	"That's All I Really Wanna Do"	Sajid–Wajid	Prasoon Joshi	Shaan
Teri Meri Kahaani	630	"Humse Pyar Kar Le Tu" (Remix Version)	Sajid–Wajid	Prasoon Joshi	Wajid, Mika Singh
Chand Ke Pare	631	"Chand Ke Pare"	Anchal Talesara	Hasmukh Gandhi	Javed Ali
Arjun: The Warrior Prince	632	"Kabhie Na Dekhe Hastinapur Mein"	Vishal–Shekhar	Piyush Mishra	Sunidhi Chauhan, Shubha Mudgal, Ila Arun
Arjun: The Warrior Prince	633	"Manva"	Vishal–Shekhar	Piyush Mishra	Swanand Kirkire, Piyush Mishra, Raja Hasan
Dangerous Ishhq	634	"Naina Re"	Himesh Reshammiya	Sameer	Himesh Reshammiya, Rahat Fateh Ali Khan
Dangerous Ishhq	635	"Naina Re" (Remix Version)	Himesh Reshammiya	Sameer	Himesh Reshammiya, Rahat Fateh Ali Khan
Dangerous Ishhq	636	"Naina Re" (Reprise Version)	Himesh Reshammiya	Sameer	Himesh Reshammiya, Rahat Fateh Ali Khan
Dangerous Ishhq	637	"Lagan Lagi"	Himesh Reshammiya	Shabbir Ahmed	Shabab Sabri
Tezz	638	"Tere Bina" (Female Version)	Sajid–Wajid	Jalees Sherwani	
Bittoo Boss	639	"Kaun Kenda" (Duet Version)	Raghav Sachar	Kumaar	Sonu Nigam
Bittoo Boss	640	"Kaun Kenda" (Female Version)	Raghav Sachar	Kumaar	
3 (Dubbed)	641	"Ai Raat Dheere Chal"	Anirudh Ravichander	Kumaar	Roop Kumar Rathod
Housefull 2	642	"Do U Know"	Sajid–Wajid	Sameer	Shaan
Housefull 2	643	"Do U Know" (Remix Version)	Sajid–Wajid	Sameer	Shaan
Agent Vinod	644	"Raabta" (Kehte Hain Khuda Ne)	Pritam	Amitabh Bhattacharya	Arijit Singh
Kahaani	645	"Kahaani" (Female Version)	Vishal–Shekhar	Vishal Dadlani	Vishal Dadlani
Tere Naal Love Ho Gaya	646	"Piya O Re Piya"	Sachin–Jigar	Priya Saraiya	Atif Aslam
Tere Naal Love Ho Gaya	647	"Piya O Re Piya" (Remix Version)	Sachin–Jigar	Priya Saraiya	Atif Aslam
Jodi Breakers	648	"Darmiyaan" (Reprise Version)	Salim–Sulaiman	Irshad Kamil	
Ekk Deewana Tha	649	"Sunlo Zara"	A. R. Rahman	Javed Akhtar	Rashid Ali, Timmy
Ekk Deewana Tha	650	"Broken Promises"	A. R. Rahman	Javed Akhtar	
Agneepath	651	"Chikni Chameli"	Ajay–Atul	Amitabh Bhattacharya	
Players	652	"Dil Ye Bekarar Kyun Hai"	Pritam	Ashish Pandit	Mohit Chauhan
Players	653	"Dil Ye Bekarar Kyun Hai" (Remix Version)	Pritam	Ashish Pandit	Mohit Chauhan
The Real Life Of Mandi	654	"Bahon Mein Bahon Ko"	Dinesh Arjuna	Daru Saifee, Deepak Sneh	Udit Narayan
Rang	655	"Khuda Ki Kasam"	Nadeem–Shravan	Sameer	Udit Narayan
Ishaqzaade	656	"Ishaqzaade"	Amit Trivedi	Kausar Munir	Javed Ali
Ishaqzaade	657	"Jhalla Wallah"	Amit Trivedi	Kausar Munir	
Ishaqzaade	658	"Jhalla Wallah" (Remix Version)	Amit Trivedi	Kausar Munir	Neuman Pinto, Ajinkya Iyer
Rowdy Rathore	659	"Dhadhang Dhang"	Sajid–Wajid	Faaiz Anwar	Wajid
Rowdy Rathore	660	"Chamak Challo Chel Chabeli"	Sajid–Wajid	Faaiz Anwar	Kumar Sanu
Rowdy Rathore	661	"Tera Ishq Bada Teekha"	Sajid–Wajid	Sameer	Javed Ali
Rowdy Rathore	662	"Chandaniya" (Lori Lori)	Sajid–Wajid	Sameer	
Jism 2	663	"Abhi Abhi" (Duet Version)	Arko Pravo Mukherjee	Manish Makhija	KK
Heroine	664	"Khwahishein"	Salim–Sulaiman	Irfan Siddiqui	
Riwayat	665	"Tum Jo Mile Ho To"	Sushil Lalji	Sudhakar Sharma	Shaan
Riwayat	666	"Fiza Mehaki Mehaki"	Sushil Lalji	Sudhakar Sharma	
Prem Mayee	667	"Pal Chinn"	Abhishek Ray	Shekhar S. Jha	Abhishek Ray
Prem Mayee	668	"Prem Mayee Rajani"	Abhishek Ray	Shekhar S. Jha	

=== 2013 ===
Film	No	Song	Composer(s)	Writer(s)	Co-artist(s)
Mumbai Mirror	669	"Thumka"	Anand Raj Anand	Satya Prakash	
Deewana Main Deewana	670	"Deewana Main Deewana"	Bappi Lahiri	Maya Govind	Sukhwinder Singh
Special 26	671	"Gore Mukhde Pe Zulfa Di Chaava"	Himesh Reshammiya	Shabbir Ahmed	Aman Trikha, Shabab Sabri
Jayantabhai Ki Luv Story	672	"Thoda Thoda"	Sachin–Jigar	Priya Saraiya	Sachin Sanghvi
Zila Ghaziabad	673	"Ranjha Jogi"	Amjad–Nadeem	Shabbir Ahmed	Sonu Nigam
Bloody Isshq	674	"Badlon Ki Hai Saazish" (Duet Version)	Ashok Bhadra	Kumaar	Sonu Nigam
Saare Jahaan Se Mehnga	675	"Bolo Na"	Manish J. Tipu	Naveen Tyagi	Sonu Nigam
Jolly LLB	676	"Daru Peeke Nachna"	Krsna Solo	Subhash Kapoor	Mika Singh
Jolly LLB	677	"Ajnabi"	Krsna Solo	Subhash Kapoor	Mohit Chauhan
Himmatwala	678	"Naino Mein Sapna"	Bappi Lahri (Recreated by Sajid–Wajid)	Indeevar	Amit Kumar
Himmatwala	679	"Taki Taki"	Bappi Lahri (Recreated by Sajid–Wajid)	Indeevar	Mika Singh
Chashme Baddoor	680	"Dhichkyaaon Doom Doom" (Version 1)	Sajid–Wajid	Neelesh Misra	Ali Zafar
Chashme Baddoor	681	"Dhichkyaaon Doom Doom" (Version 2)	Sajid–Wajid	Neelesh Misra	Wajid
Aashiqui 2	682	"Sunn Raha Hai" (Female Version)	Ankit Tiwari	Sandeep Nath	
Aashiqui 2	683		Ankit Tiwari	Sandeep Nath	
Bombay Talkies	684	"Bombay Talkies" (Group Version)	Amit Trivedi	Swanand Kirkire	Abhijeet Bhattacharya, Alka Yagnik, Kavita Krishnamurthy, KK, Kumar Sanu, Mohit Chauhan, S. P. Balasubrahmanyam, Shaan, Shilpa Rao, Sonu Nigam, Sudesh Bhonsle, Sukhwinder Singh, Sunidhi Chauhan, Udit Narayan
Go Goa Gone	685	"Khushamdeed"	Sachin–Jigar	Priya Saraiya	
Ishkq in Paris	686	"Kudiye Di Kurti"	Sajid–Wajid	Kausar Munir	Sonu Nigam
Yamla Pagla Deewana 2	687	"Changli Hai Changli Hai"	Sharib–Toshi	Kumaar	Mika Singh
Raanjhanaa	688	"Banarasiya"	A. R. Rahman	Irshad Kamil	Anweshaa, Meenal Jain
Bhaag Milkha Bhaag	689	"O Rangrez"	Shankar–Ehsaan–Loy	Prasoon Joshi	Javed Bashir
Ramaiya Vastavaiya	690	"Jeene Laga Hoon"	Sachin–Jigar	Priya Saraiya	Atif Aslam
Ramaiya Vastavaiya	691	"Bairiyaa"	Sachin–Jigar	Priya Saraiya	Atif Aslam
Ramaiya Vastavaiya	692	"Rang Jo Lagyo"	Sachin–Jigar	Priya Saraiya	Atif Aslam
Luv U Soniyo	693	"Palko Pe Phool"	Vipin Patwa	Dr. Sagar	Shaan
Zanjeer	694	"Shakila Banoo"	Anand Raj Anand	Manoj Yadav	
Besharam	695	"Aa Re Aa Re"	Lalit Pandit	Rajeev Barnwal	Mika Singh
Besharam	696	"Aa Re Aa Re" (Remix Version)	Lalit Pandit	Rajeev Barnwal	Mika Singh
Besharam	697	"Dil Kaa Jo Haal Hai"	Lalit Pandit	Rajeev Barnwal	Abhijeet Bhattacharya
Besharam	698	"Dil Kaa Jo Haal Hai" (Remix Version)	Lalit Pandit	Rajeev Barnwal	Abhijeet Bhattacharya
Besharam	699	"Tu Hai"	Lalit Pandit	Nikhat Khan	Sonu Nigam
Pazhassi Raja (Dubbed)	700	"Pritam Dil"	Ilaiyaraaja	Manoj Santoshi, Manisha Korde	
Paapi: Ek Satya Katha	701	"Kahani Mein Mohabbat Hai"	Anand–Milind	Sameer	Sonu Nigam
War Chhod Na Yaar	702	"Main Jaagun Aksar" (Version 1)	Aslam Keyi	Azeem Shirazi	Javed Ali, Ali Aslam
War Chhod Na Yaar	703	"Main Jaagun Aksar" (Version 2)	Aslam Keyi	Azeem Shirazi	Shujath Ali Khan, Ali Aslam
Krrish 3	704	"God Allah Aur Bhagwan"	Rajesh Roshan	Sameer	Sonu Nigam
Goliyon Ki Raasleela: Ram-Leela	705	"Nagada Sang Dhol"	Sanjay Leela Bhansali	Siddharth–Garima	Osman Mir
Goliyon Ki Raasleela: Ram-Leela	706	"Dhoop"	Sanjay Leela Bhansali	Siddharth–Garima	
Singh Saab the Great	707	"Jab Mehndi Lag Lag Jaave"	Anand Raj Anand	Kumaar	Sonu Nigam
Bullett Raja	708	"Saamne Hai Savera"	Sajid–Wajid	Kausar Munir	Bonnie Chakraborty, Wajid
Jackpot	709	"Kabhi Jo Baadal Barse" (Female Version)	Sharib–Toshi	A. M. Turaz, Azeem Shirazi	
Khushi Mil Gayi	710	"Zamaane Ki Saari Khushi Mil Gayi"	Dilip Sen–Sameer Sen	Anjaan Sagri	Udit Narayan

=== 2014 ===
Film	No	Song	Composer(s)	Writer(s)	Co-artist(s)
Jai Ho	711	"Tere Naina Maar Hi Daalenge"	Sajid–Wajid	Sameer	Shaan, Shabab Sabri
Hasee Toh Phasee	712	"Drama Queen"	Vishal–Shekhar	Amitabh Bhattacharya	Vishal Dadlani
Hasee Toh Phasee	713	"Drama Queen" (Remix Version)	Vishal–Shekhar	Amitabh Bhattacharya	Vishal Dadlani
Darr @ The Mall	714	"Tera Reham"	Shankar–Ehsaan–Loy	Amitabh Bhattacharya	
Bewakoofiyaan	715	"Rumaani Sa"	Raghu Dixit	Anvita Dutt Guptan	Mohit Chauhan
Honour Killing	716	"Dilan Te Hukumtaan" (Female Version)	Uttam Singh	Dev Kohli	
Honour Killing	717	"Dholna"	Uttam Singh	Dev Kohli	Kunal Ganjawala
Samrat & Co.	718	"Tequila Wakila"	Ankit Tiwari	Sanjay Masoom	Ankit Tiwari
Samrat & Co.	719	"Sawaalon Mein"	Ankit Tiwari	Sandeep Nath	
Kahin Hai Mera Pyar	720	"Tu Hase Toh"	Ravindra Jain	Ravindra Jain	Shaan
Khwaabb	721	"Shamein"	Sajjad Ali Chandwani	A. M. Turaz	Rahat Fateh Ali Khan
Heropanti	722	"Raat Bhar"	Sajid–Wajid	Kausar Munir	Arijit Singh
Kochadaiiyaan (Dubbed)	723	"Mera Gham"	A. R. Rahman	Irshad Kamil	Javed Ali
Bobby Jasoos	724	"Jashn"	Shantanu Moitra	Swanand Kirkire	Bonnie Chakraborty
Bobby Jasoos	725	"Tu"	Shantanu Moitra	Swanand Kirkire	Papon
Bobby Jasoos	726	"Tu" (Reprise Version)	Shantanu Moitra	Swanand Kirkire	Papon
Humpty Sharma Ki Dulhania	727	"Samjhawan"	Jawad Ahmad (Recreated by Sharib−Toshi)	Ahmad Anees (Additional lyrics by Kumaar)	Arijit Singh
Kick	728	"Hangover"	Meet Bros	Kumaar	Salman Khan
Kick	729	"Hangover" (Remix Version)	Meet Bros	Kumaar	Salman Khan
Life Is Beautiful	730	"Kya Bataoon" (Reprise Version)	John T. Hunt	Vimal Kashyap	Sonu Nigam
Life Is Beautiful	731	"Kya Sunaoon" (Unplugged Version)	John T. Hunt	Vimal Kashyap	Sonu Nigam
Life Is Beautiful	732	"Kya Sunaoon"	John T. Hunt	Vimal Kashyap	Sonu Nigam
Daawat-e-Ishq	733	"Mannat"	Sajid–Wajid	Kausar Munir	Keerthi Sagathia, Sonu Nigam
Daawat-e-Ishq	734	"Rangreli"	Sajid–Wajid	Kausar Munir	Wajid
Daawat-e-Ishq	735	"Mannat" (Reprise Version)	Sajid–Wajid	Kausar Munir	Sonu Nigam
Daawat-e-Ishq	736	"Daawat-e-Ishq Mashup"	Sajid–Wajid	Kausar Munir	Javed Ali, Keerthi Sagathia, Sonu Nigam, Sunidhi Chauhan, Sunny Subramanian, Wajid
Desi Kattey	737	"Albeliya"	Kailash Kher	Kailash Kher	
Spark	738	"Kuchh Lab Pe Hai Kuch Dil Mein Hai"	Nitz 'N' Sony	Sameer	Sonu Nigam
Happy New Year	739	"Manwa Laage"	Vishal–Shekhar	Irshad Kamil	Arijit Singh
Super Nani	740	"Prabhu Mere Ghar Ko"	Harshit Saxena	Sameer	
Super Nani	741	"Dhaani Chunariya"	Harshit Saxena	Sameer	Harshit Saxena
Super Nani	742	"Maheroo Maheroo"	Sanjeev–Darshan	Sanjeev Chaturvedi	Darshan Rathod
Hum Hai Teen Khurafaati	743	"Chupke Se" (Male Version)	Kashi–Richard	Satya Prakash	Aishwarya Nigam
Hum Hai Teen Khurafaati	744	"Chupke Se" (Female Version)	Kashi–Richard	Satya Prakash	
Badlapur Boys	745	"More Saiyyan"	Raju Sardar	Sameer	Javed Ali
PK	746	"Nanga Punga Dost"	Shantanu Moitra	Swanand Kirkire	
PK	747	"Chaar Kadam"	Shantanu Moitra	Swanand Kirkire	Shaan
PK	748	"Love Is A Waste Of Time"	Shantanu Moitra	Amitabh Verma	Sonu Nigam

=== 2015 ===
Film	No	Song	Composer(s)	Writer(s)	Co-artist(s)
I (Dubbed)	749	"Tu Chale"	A. R. Rahman	Irshad Kamil	Arijit Singh
Hey Bro	750	"Bulbul"	Nitz 'N' Sony	Pranav Vatsa	Himesh Reshammiya
Barkhaa	751	"Lafze Bayaan"	Amjad–Nadeem	Shadab Akhtar	Mohammed Irfan
Piku	752	"Journey Song"	Anupam Roy	Anupam Roy	Anupam Roy
Hamari Adhuri Kahani	753	"Hasi" (Female Version)	Ami Mishra	Kunaal Vermaa	
Bezubaan Ishq	754	"Teri Meri Ankahi Dastan"	Rupesh Verma	Jashwant Gangani	Mohit Chauhan
Jaanisaar	755	"Hamein Bhi Pyar Kar Le"	Muzaffar Ali, Shafqat Ali Khan	Wajid Ali Shah	
Jaanisaar	756	"Champayi Rang Yaar Aajaye"	Muzaffar Ali, Shafqat Ali Khan	Wajid Ali Shah	Shafqat Ali Khan
Jaanisaar	757	"Aye Zulfe-E-Pareshaan"	Muzaffar Ali, Shafqat Ali Khan	Rahi Masoom Raza	Sukhwinder Singh
Jaanisaar	758	"Masnad Luti"	Muzaffar Ali, Shafqat Ali Khan	Neer Aleef	
Jaanisaar	759	"Achchi Surat Pe"	Muzaffar Ali, Shafqat Ali Khan	Daagh Dehlvi	
Brothers	760	"Gaaye Jaa" (Female Version)	Ajay–Atul	Amitabh Bhattacharya	
Chehere: A Modern Day Classic	761	"Chaand Baadal"	Jaideep Choudhury	Sayeed Quadri	Kunal Ganjawala
Kis Kisko Pyaar Karoon	762	"Samandar"	Tanishk Bagchi	Arafat Mehmood	Jubin Nautiyal
Mudrank: The Stamp	763	"Jism Se Jism"	Bappi Lahiri	Shakir Shaikh	
Wedding Pullav	764	"Oh Jaaniya" (Version 1)	Salim–Sulaiman	Irfan Siddiqui	Salim Merchant, Raj Pandit
Wedding Pullav	765	"Oh Jaaniya" (Version 2)	Salim–Sulaiman	Irfan Siddiqui	Arijit Singh
Anarkali	766	"Mohabbat" (Hindi Version)	Vidyasagar	Rajeev Nair	Shadab Faridi
Bajirao Mastani	767	"Deewani Mastani"	Sanjay Leela Bhansali	Siddharth–Garima	
Bajirao Mastani	768	"Mohe Rang Do Laal"	Sanjay Leela Bhansali	Siddharth–Garima	Pandit Birju Maharaj
Bajirao Mastani	769	"Pinga"	Sanjay Leela Bhansali	Siddharth–Garima	Vaishali Mhade
Main Hoon Part-Time Killer	770	"Saathiya Aaj Mujhe Neend Nahin Aayegi"	Bappi Lahiri		Bappi Lahiri, Sharon Prabhakar, Shakti Kapoor

=== 2016 ===
Film	No	Song	Composer(s)	Lyricist(s)	Co-artist(s)
Wazir	771	"Tere Bin"	Shantanu Moitra	Vidhu Vinod Chopra	Sonu Nigam
Sanam Re	772	"Tum Bin"	Nikhil-Vinay (Recreated by Jeet Gannguli)	Pushpa Patel (Additional by Rashmi Virag)	
Ishq Forever	773	"Ishq Ki Baarish"	Nadeem Saifi	Sameer	Javed Ali
Ishq Forever	774	"Ishq Ki Baarish" (Version 2)	Nadeem Saifi	Sameer	Sonu Nigam
Ishq Forever	775	"Mere Aankhon Se Nikle Aansoo"	Nadeem Saifi	Sameer	Rahat Fateh Ali Khan
Ishq Forever	776	"Ishq Forever" (Teaser Version)	Nadeem Saifi	Sameer	
Cute Kameena	777	"Shaam Hote Hi"	Krsna Solo	Rajshekhar	
Cute Kameena	778	"Rafa Dafa"	Krsna Solo	Rajshekhar	Krsna Solo
Rocky Handsome	779	"Rehnuma"	Sunny Bawra, Inder Bawra	Manoj Muntashir, Sagar Lahauri	Inder Bawra
Rocky Handsome	780	"Aye Khuda" (Duet Version)	Sunny Bawra, Inder Bawra	Sachin Pathak, Shekhar Astitwa	Rahat Fateh Ali Khan
Rocky Handsome	781	"Alfazon Ki Tarah" (Unplugged)	Ankit Tiwari	Abhendra Kumar Upadhyay	Ankit Tiwari, John Abraham
Ki & Ka	782	"Foolishq"	Ilaiyaraaja	Amitabh Bhattacharya	Armaan Malik
Sardaar Gabbar Singh (Dubbed)	783	"Tu Mila Subhanallah"	Devi Sri Prasad	Kumaar	Vijay Prakash
Dil Toh Deewana Hai	784	"Kyun Dil Ki Galiyo Mai"	Anand Raj Anand	Ibrahim `Ashk'	Anand Raj Anand
Kabali (Dubbed)	785	"Jadoo Rawan Rawan"	Santhosh Narayanan	Raqib Aalam	Pradeep Kumar, Ananthu, Sanjana Kalmanje
Rustom	786	"Jab Tum Hote Ho"	Ankit Tiwari	Manoj Muntashir	
Tutak Tutak Tutiya	787	"Ranga Re" (Hindi Version)	Vishal Mishra	Pranav Vatsa	
Fuddu	788	"Tu Zaroorat Nahi Tu Zaroori Hai"	Sumeet Bellary	Satya Khare	Gandharv Sachdev
Fuddu	789	"Tu Zaroorat Nahi Tu Zaroori Hai" (Hip Hop Mix)	Sumeet Bellary	Satya Khare	Gandharv Sachdev
Fuddu	790	"Tu Zaroorat Nahi Tu Zaroori Hai" (Female Version)	Sumeet Bellary	Satya Khare	

=== 2017 ===
Film	No	Song	Composer(s)	Writer(s)	Co-artist(s)
Raees	791	"Halka Halka"	Ram Sampath	Javed Akhtar	Sonu Nigam, Ram Sampath
Badrinath Ki Dulhania	792	"Aashiq Surrender Hua"	Amaal Mallik	Shabbir Ahmed	Amaal Mallik
Naam Shabana	793	"Rozana"	Rochak Kohli	Manoj Muntashir	
Blue Mountains	794	"Kaare Kaare Badra"	Monty Sharma	Sunil Sirvaiya	
Begum Jaan	795	"Woh Subah"	Khayyam (Recreated by Anu Malik)	Sahir Ludhianvi	Arijit Singh
Begum Jaan	796	"Holi Khelein"	Anu Malik	Kausar Munir	Anmol Malik
Half Girlfriend	797	"Thodi Der"	Farhan Saeed	Asad Chauhan (Additional lyrics by Kumaar)	Farhan Saeed
Raagdesh	798	"Hawaon Mein Woh Aag Hai"	Ram Singh Thakuri (Recreated by Rana Mazumder)	Vanshidhar Shukla (Additional by Sandeep Nath)	K.K.
Raagdesh	799	"Ghar Chaado" (Bengali)	Ram Singh Thakuri (Recreated by Rana Mazumder)	Vanshidhar Shukla (Bengali by Rana Mazumder)	Rana Mazumder
Raagdesh	800	"Tujhe Namaami Ho"	Rana Mazumder	Sandeep Nath	Sunidhi Chauhan, K.K., Rana Mazumder
Toilet: Ek Prem Katha	801	"Hans Mat Pagli"	Vickey Prasad	Siddharth-Garima	Sonu Nigam
A Gentleman	802	"Laagi Na Choote"	Sachin–Jigar	Priya Saraiya	Arijit Singh
Dil Jo Na Keh Saka	803	"Dil Jo Na Keh Saka"	Shail-Pritesh	A. M. Turaz	Shail Hada
Shaadi Abhi Baaki Hai	804	"Jab Tum" (Female)	Sanjeev–Darshan	Nasir Faraaz	
Tera Intezaar	805	"Intezaar" (Title Track)	Raaj Aashoo	Shabbir Ahmed	
Tiger Zinda Hai	806	"Daata Tu"	Vishal–Shekhar	Irshad Kamil	

=== 2018 ===
Film	No	Song	Composer(s)	Lyricist(s)	Co-artist(s)
Phir Se...	807	"Phir Se" (Title Track)	Jeet Gannguli	Rashmi Virag	Nikhil D'Souza
Phir Se...	808	"Maine Socha Ke Chura Loon"	Jeet Gannguli	Rashmi Virag	Arijit Singh
Phir Se...	809	"Yeh Dil Jo Hai Badmaash Hai"	Jeet Gannguli	Rashmi Virag	Mohit Chauhan, Monali Thakur
Phir Se...	810	"Phir Se" (Sad Version)	Jeet Gannguli	Rashmi Virag	Nikhil D'Souza
Phir Se...	811	"Phir Se" (Remixed by Sandeep Shirodkar)	Jeet Gannguli	Rashmi Virag	Nikhil D'Souza
Padmaavat	812	"Ghoomar"	Sanjay Leela Bhansali	A. M. Turaz, Swaroop Khan	Swaroop Khan
Baaghi 2	813	"Ek Do Teen" (Rap by Parry G)	Laxmikant–Pyarelal (Recreated by Sandeep Shirodkar)	Javed Akhtar	
Ishq Tera	814	"Ishq Tera" (Title Track)	Swapnil H. Digde	Manoj Yadav	Sonu Nigam
Sanju	815	"Kar Har Maidaan Fateh"	Vikram Montrose	Shekhar Astitwa	Sukhwinder Singh
Dhadak	816	"Dhadak" (Title Track)	Ajay–Atul	Amitabh Bhattacharya	Ajay Gogavale
Laila Majnu	817	"Sarphiri"	Niladri Kumar	Irshad Kamil	Babul Supriyo
Jalebi	818	"Pal"	Javed-Mohsin	Prashant Ingole, Kunaal Vermaa	Arijit Singh
Jalebi	819	"Tera Mera Rishta"	Tanishk Bagchi	Arafat Mehmood	KK
Jalebi	820	"Pal" (Female Version)	Javed-Mohsin	Prashant Ingole, Kunaal Vermaa	
Jalebi	821	"Pal" (Remix by DJ Amit B)	Javed-Mohsin	Prashant Ingole, Kunaal Vermaa	Arijit Singh
5 Weddings	822	"Baaki Hai"	Vibhas Arora	Abhendra Kumar Upadhyay	Sonu Nigam
Dassehra	823	"Silent Mode"	Vijay Verma	Rajesh Mànthan	Mika Singh, Rahul B. Seth
Thugs of Hindostan	824	"Suraiyya"	Ajay–Atul	Amitabh Bhattacharya	Vishal Dadlani
Thugs of Hindostan	825	"Manzoor-e-Khuda"	Ajay–Atul	Amitabh Bhattacharya	Sunidhi Chauhan, Sukhwinder Singh

=== 2019 ===
Film	No	Song	Composer(s)	Lyricist(s)	Co-artist(s)
Rangeela Raja	826	"Dholi Dhol Baja"	Ishwar Kumar	Mehboob	Udit Narayan, Dev Negi, Ishwar Kumar
Rangeela Raja	827	"Jagmag Jagmag"	Ishwar Kumar	Mehboob	Mohammed Irfan
Rangeela Raja	828	"Aum"	Ishwar Kumar	Sikandar Bharti	Ishwar Kumar
72 Hours: Martyr Who Never Died	829	"Ore Chanda"	Sunjoy Bose	Seema Saini	Sunjoy Bose
Facebook Wala Pyar	830	"Mann Bawra" (Duet Version)	Raja Pandit	Shweta Raj, Raja Pandit	Sonu Nigam
Milan Talkies	831	"Mind Na Kariyo Holi Hai"	Rana Mazumder	Amitabh Bhattacharya	Mika Singh
Kalank	832	"Ghar More Pardesiya"	Pritam	Amitabh Bhattacharya	
Kalank	833	"Tabaah Ho Gaye"	Pritam	Amitabh Bhattacharya	
Kalank	834	"Ghar More Pardesiya" (Radio Edit)	Pritam	Amitabh Bhattacharya	Vaishali Mhade
Music Teacher	835	"Rimjhim Gire Saawan"	Rochak Kohli (Original by R. D. Burman)	Yogesh	Papon
Bharat	836	"Slow Motion"	Vishal–Shekhar	Irshad Kamil	Nakash Aziz
Kabir Singh	837	"Yeh Aaina"	Amaal Mallik	Irshad Kamil	
Hume Tumse Pyaar Kitna	838	"Hume Tumse Pyaar Kitna" (Female)	Raaj Aashoo (Original by R. D. Burman)	Shabbir Ahmed (Original by Majrooh Sultanpuri)	
Hume Tumse Pyaar Kitna	839	"Hume Tumse Pyaar Kitna" (Thumri Version)	Raaj Aashoo (Original by R. D. Burman)	Shabbir Ahmed (Original by Majrooh Sultanpuri)	
Malaal	840	"Katthai Katthai"	Sanjay Leela Bhansali	A. M. Turaz, Prashant Ingole	
Super 30	841	"Jugraafiya"	Ajay–Atul	Amitabh Bhattacharya	Udit Narayan
Family of Thakurganj	842	"Hum Teri Ore Chale"	Sajid–Wajid	Danish Sabri	Sonu Nigam
Sye Raa Narasimha Reddy (Dubbed)	843	"Sandal Meraa Mann"	Amit Trivedi	Swanand Kirkire	Abhijeet Srivastava
Sye Raa Narasimha Reddy (Dubbed)	844	"Sye Raa" (Title Track)	Amit Trivedi	Swanand Kirkire	Sunidhi Chauhan
Laal Kaptaan	845	"Red Red Najariya"	Samira Koppikar	Saurabh Jain	
Housefull 4	846	"Chammo"	Sohail Sen	Sameer Anjaan	Sukhwinder Singh, Shadab Faridi
Panipat	847	"Sapna Hai Sach Hai"	Ajay–Atul	Javed Akhtar	Abhay Jodhpurkar
The Body	848	"Itna Pyaar Karo"	Shamir Tandon	Kumaar	
Dabangg 3	849	"Habibi Ke Nain"	Sajid–Wajid	Irfan Kamal	Jubin Nautiyal

=== 2020 ===
Film	No	Song	Composer(s)	Lyricist(s)	Co-artist(s)
Bhangra Paa Le	850	"Angana"	JAM8	Shloke Lal	Javed Ali
Tanhaji	851	"Maay Bhavani"	Ajay–Atul	Swanand Kirkire	Sukhwinder Singh
Happy Hardy and Heer	852	"Heeriye"	Himesh Reshammiya	Vishal Mishra	Arijit Singh
Shikara	853	"Ghar Bhara Sa Lage"	Sandesh Shandilya	Irshad Kamil	Papon
Babloo Bachelor	854	"Banna Banni"	Jeet Gannguli	Rashmi Virag	Bappi Lahiri
Dil Bechara	855	"Taare Ginn"	A. R. Rahman	Amitabh Bhattacharya	Mohit Chauhan
Shakuntala Devi	856	"Paheli"	Sachin–Jigar	Priya Saraiya	
Sadak 2	857	"Chal Tera Shukriya"	Jeet Gannguli	Jeet Gannguli, Rashmi Virag	Jeet Gannguli
Main Mulayam Singh Yadav	858	"Tori Soorat Pe Dil Har Gayee"	Sharib−Toshi	Kalim Shaikh	
The Battle Of Bhima Koregaon	859	"Rangeeli Raat Ka"	Lalit Pandit, Ramesh Thete		
The Battle Of Bhima Koregaon	860	"Dil Ne Dil Se"	Lalit Pandit, Ramesh Thete		Sonu Nigam

=== 2021 ===
Film	No	Song	Composer(s)	Lyricist(s)	Co-artist(s)
Tuesdays And Fridays	861	"Funky Mohabbat"	Tony Kakkar	Kumaar	Benny Dayal, Sonu Kakkar
Tuesdays And Fridays	862	"Hanjuaan"	Tony Kakkar	Kumaar	
Saina	863	"Chal Wahin Chalein"	Amaal Mallik	Manoj Muntashir	
Online Pyaar	864	"Pass Aao Jara"	Nithin Shankar	Sahil Sultanpuri	Javed Ali
Mimi	865	"Param Sundari"	A. R. Rahman	Amitabh Bhattacharya	
Bhuj: The Pride of India	866	"Zaalima Coca Cola"	Tanishk Bagchi (Original by Ustad Tafu)	Vayu (Original by Khawaja Pervaiz)	
Bhoot Police	867	"Mujhe Pyaar Pyaar Hai"	Sachin–Jigar	Priya Saraiya	Armaan Malik
Sanak	868	"Suna Hai" (Female Version)	Jeet Gannguli	Rashmi Virag	
Bhavai	869	"Kahe Muskay Re"	Shabbir Ahmed	Shabbir Ahmed	
Bhavai	870	"Mohe Ram Rang Rang De"	Shabbir Ahmed	Shabbir Ahmed	Udit Narayan
Meenakshi Sundareshwar	871	"Ratti Ratti Reza Reza"	Justin Prabhakaran	Raj Shekhar	Abhay Jodhpurkar
Atrangi Re	872	"Chaka Chak"	A. R. Rahman	Irshad Kamil	
Atrangi Re	873	"Tere Rang"	A. R. Rahman	Irshad Kamil	Haricharan

=== 2022 ===
Film	No	Song	Composer(s)	Lyricist(s)	Co-artist(s)
Gangubai Kathiawadi	874	"Jab Saiyaan"	Sanjay Leela Bhansali	A. M. Turaz	
Bachchan Pandey	875	"Heer Raanjhana"	Amaal Malik	Kumaar	Arijit Singh
Bhool Bhulaiyaa 2	876	"Ami Je Tomar" (Kiara's Version)	Pritam	Sameer Anjaan	Arijit Singh
Bhool Bhulaiyaa 2	877	"Mere Dholna" (The Sisters' Version)	Pritam	Sameer Anjaan	
Bhool Bhulaiyaa 2	878	"Mere Dholna" (Revisited)	Pritam	Saaveri Verma, Sameer Anjaan	
Bhool Bhulaiyaa 2	879	"Ami Je Tomar" (Kartik x Vidya)	Pritam	Sameer Anjaan	Arijit Singh
Samrat Prithviraj	880	"Makhmali"	Shankar-Ehsaan-Loy	Varun Grover	Arijit Singh
Ittu Si Baat	881	"Gulabi"	Vishal Mishra	Raj Shekhar	Vishal Mishra
Raksha Bandhan	882	"Dhaagon Se Baandhaa"	Himesh Reshammiya	Irshad Kamil	Arijit Singh
Raksha Bandhan	883	"Raksha Bandhan"	Himesh Reshammiya	Irshad Kamil	
Raksha Bandhan	884	"Raksha Bandhan" (Reprise)	Himesh Reshammiya	Irshad Kamil	Stebin Ben
Ek Villain Returns	885	"Dil" (Shreya's Version)	Kaushik-Guddu	Kunaal Vermaa	
Brahmāstra Part One: Shiva	886	"Rasiya"	Pritam	Amitabh Bhattacharya	Tushar Joshi
Laal Singh Chaddha (Extended Album)	887	"Tere Hawaale" (Arijit-Shreya Duet)	Pritam	Amitabh Bhattacharya	Arijit Singh
Ponniyin Selvan: I (Dubbed)	888	"Rakshas Mama Re"	A. R. Rahman	Mehboob	Shaan, Mahesh Vinayakram
Ponniyin Selvan: I (Dubbed)	889	"Bol"	A. R. Rahman	Mehboob	
Maja Ma	890	"Boom Padi"	Souumil-Siddharth	Priya Saraiya	Osman Mir
Godfather	891	"Thaar Maar Thakkar Maar"	Thaman S.	Vimal Kashyap	
Goodbye	892	"Maaye" (Reprise)	Amit Trivedi	Swanand Kirkire	Devenderpal Singh
Kartoot	893	"Mere Thumke Ka"	Anisadh	Kameshvar Shukla	
Life's Good	894	"Palko Ke Palne"	Abhishek Ray	Nivedita Joshi	
Salaam Venky	895	"Jo Tum Saath Ho" (Duet)	Mithoon	Mithoon	Arijit Singh
Salaam Venky	896	"Jo Tum Saath Ho" (Lullaby)	Mithoon	Mithoon	Shambhavi Thakur, Sminit Mhatre
Cirkus	897	"Sun Zara"	Devi Sri Prasad	Kumaar	Papon
Ved (Dubbed)	898	"Tum Jo Mile"	Ajay-Atul	Kshitij Patwardhan	

=== 2023 ===
Film	No	Song	Composer(s)	Lyricist(s)	Co-artist(s)
Gandhi Godse: Ek Yudh	899	"Vaishnav Jan To"	A. R. Rahman	Narsinh Mehta	
Lost	900	"Nouka Doobi"	Shantanu Moitra	Swanand Kirkire	
Tu Jhoothi Main Makkaar	901	"Maine Pi Rakhi Hai"	Pritam	Amitabh Bhattacharya	Divya Kumar
Ponniyin Selvan: II (Dubbed)	902	"Veera Raja Veera"	A. R. Rahman	Gulzar	Kavita Krishnamurthy, Arman Dehlvi
Music School (Dubbed)	903	"Teri Nigaahon"	Ilaiyaraaja	Dr. Sagar, Raman Raghuvanshi	Javed Ali
Adipurush	904	"Tu Hai Sheetal Dhaara"	Ajay-Atul	Manoj Muntashir	Sonu Nigam
1920: Horrors of the Heart	905	"Lori"	Puneet Dixit	Shweta Bothra	
1920: Horrors of the Heart	906	"Lori" (Slow Version)	Puneet Dixit	Shweta Bothra	
Tiku Weds Sheru	907	"Meri Jaane Jaan"	Gaurav Chatterji	Shellee	Nakash Aziz, Cyli Khare
Trial Period	908	"Gole Male"	Kaushik-Guddu	Traditional	Dev Negi; Rap: Guddu
Rocky Aur Rani Kii Prem Kahaani	909	"Tum Kya Mile" (Radio Edit)	Pritam	Amitabh Bhattacharya	Arijit Singh
Rocky Aur Rani Kii Prem Kahaani	910	"Tum Kya Mile"	Pritam	Amitabh Bhattacharya	Arijit Singh
Rocky Aur Rani Kii Prem Kahaani	911	"Tum Kya Mile" (Shreya's Version)	Pritam	Amitabh Bhattacharya	
Rocky Aur Rani Kii Prem Kahaani	912	"Ve Kamleya"	Pritam	Amitabh Bhattacharya	Arijit Singh, Shadab Faridi, Altamash Faridi
Rocky Aur Rani Kii Prem Kahaani	913	"Ve Kamleya" (Redux)	Pritam	Amitabh Bhattacharya	Tushar Joshi
Dono	914	"Khamma Ghani"	Shankar-Ehsaan-Loy	Irshad Kamil	Shivam Mahadevan
Mujib: The Making of a Nation	915	"Marsiya"	Shantanu Moitra	Atul Tiwari	
12th Fail	916	"Bolo Na"	Shantanu Moitra	Swanand Kirkire	Shaan
Tejas	917	"Jaan Da"	Shashwat Sachdev	Kumaar	Shashwat Sachdev
Manush: Child of Destiny (Dubbed)	918	"Barse Re"	Aneek Dhar	Panchhi Jalonvi	Abhay Jodhpurkar
Animal	919	"Kashmir"	Manan Bhardwaj	Manan Bhardwaj	Manan Bhardwaj
Sam Bahadur	920	"Itni Si Baat"	Shankar-Ehsaan-Loy	Gulzar	Sonu Nigam
Kadak Singh	921	"Tu Jo Hai"	Shantanu Moitra	Tanveer Ghazi	
Dunki	922	"Main Tera Rasta Dekhunga"	Pritam	Amitabh Bhattacharya	Vishal Mishra, Shadab Faridi, Altamash Faridi

=== 2024 ===
Film	No	Song	Composer(s)	Lyricist(s)	Co-artist(s)
Main Atal Hoon	923	"Ankaha"	Salim–Sulaiman	Manoj Muntashir	Armaan Malik
Crakk	924	"Jhoom"	Tanishk Bagchi (Original by Ali Zafar)	Gurpreet Saini (Original by Ali Zafar)	Vishal Mishra
Laapataa Ladies	925	"Dheeme Dheeme"	Ram Sampath	Swanand Kirkire	
Dukaan	926	"Maa Banne Wali Hoon"	Shreyas Puranik	Siddharth-Garima	Aishwarya Bhandari
Savi	927	"Paas Tere Main"	Javed-Mohsin	Rashmi Virag	Jubin Nautiyal
Savi	928	"O Yaarum"	Arkadeep Karmakar	Ritajaya Banerjee	
Maharaj	929	"Holi Ke Rang Ma"	Sohail Sen	Kausar Munir	Shaan, Osman Mir, Sohail Sen
Sarfira	930	"Chaawat"	G.V. Prakash Kumar	Manoj Muntashir	
No Means No	931	TBA	Hariharan	TBA	
Vedaa	932	"Zaroorat Se Zyada" (Female Version)	Amaal Mallik	Kunaal Vermaa	
Vedaa	933	"Zaroorat Se Zyada" (Duet Version)	Amaal Mallik	Kunaal Vermaa	Arijit Singh
Do Patti	934	"Thaaein Thaaein"	Sachet-Parampara	Kausar Munir	Sachet Tandon
Krispy Rishtey	935	"Ab Tujhse"	Apernit Singh	Ajay K Garg	
Krispy Rishtey	936	"Kyon Tujhse 1"	Apernit Singh	Ajay K Garg	Swaroop Khan
Krispy Rishtey	937	"Kyon Tujhse 2"	Apernit Singh	Ajay K Garg	Swaroop Khan
Bhool Bhulaiyaa 3	938	"Ami Je Tomar 3.0"	Amaal Mallik (Original by Pritam)	Sameer Anjaan	
Dharmarakshak Mahaveer Chhatrapati Sambhaji Maharaj (Dubbed)	939	"Jiya Jaye Na"	Mohit Kulkarni	Dr. Prasad Biware	
Pushpa 2: The Rule (Dubbed)	940	"Angaaron" (The Couple Song)	Devi Sri Prasad	Raqueeb Alam	
Vanvaas	941	"Yaadon Ke Jharokhon Se"	Mithoon	Sayeed Quadri	Sonu Nigam
Baby John	942	"Hazaar Baar"	Thaman S.	Irshad Kamil	Arijit Singh, Vaikom Vijayalakshmi

=== 2025 ===
Film	No	Song	Composer(s)	Lyricist(s)	Co-artist(s)
Game Changer (Dubbed)	943	"Jaana Hairaan Sa"	Thaman S.	Kausar Munir	Karthik
Badass Ravi Kumar	944	"Bazaar-E-Ishq"	Himesh Reshammiya	Shabbir Ahmed	Himesh Reshammiya
Thandel (Dubbed)	945	"Hailessa"	Devi Sri Prasad	Raqueeb Alam	Nakash Aziz
Aachari Baa	946	"Lori Song"	Prasad S	Priyanka R Bala	
Pintu Ki Pappi	947	"Nafarmaniyan"	DR. NITZ, Sonal Pradhan	Sonal Pradhan	Javed Ali
Bhool Chuk Maaf	948	"Koi Naa"	Tanishk Bagchi, Gifty	Irshad Kamil	Harnoor
Maa	949	"Humnava"	Rocky Khanna, Shiv Malhotra	Manoj Muntashir	Jubin Nautiyal
Metro... In Dino	950	"Qayde Se" (Rewind)	Pritam	Amitabh Bhattacharya	
Maalik	951	"Naamumkin"	Sachin-Jigar	Amitabh Bhattacharya	Varun Jain
Saiyaara	952	"Saiyaara" (Reprise)	Tanishk Bagchi, Faheem Abdullah, Arslan Nizami	Irshad Kamil	
Saiyaara	953	"Vaani Batra"	Tanishk Bagchi, Faheem Abdullah, Arslan Nizami	Irshad Kamil	
Sarzameen	954	"Aaj Ruk Jaa" (Female Version)	Vishal Khurana K	Kausar Munir	
Sarzameen	955	"Aaa Gale Lag Ja" (Female Version)	Vishal Khurana K	Kausar Munir	
Sarzameen	956	"Aaa Gale Lag Ja" (Duet)	Vishal Khurana K	Kausar Munir	Sonu Nigam
Dhadak 2	957	"Bas Ek Dhadak"	Javed-Mohsin	Rashmi Virag	Jubin Nautiyal
Tehran	958	"Ishq Bukhaar"	Tanishk Bagchi	Irshad Kamil	B Praak
Param Sundari	959	"Bheegi Saree"	Sachin-Jigar	Amitabh Bhattacharya	Adnan Sami
Aabeer Gulaal	960	"Doriyaan"	Amit Trivedi	Kumaar	Arijit Singh
Sunny Sanskari Ki Tulsi Kumari	961	"Ishq Manzoor"	A.P.S	Jairaj	Amit Mishra, Nakash Aziz, Antara Mitra
Ek Deewane Ki Deewaniyat	962	"Mera Hua" (Female Version)	Annkur R Pathakk	Sachin Urmtosh	
De De Pyaar De 2	963	"Baabul Ve"	Aditya Dev-Payal Dev	Kumaar	
120 Bahadur	964	"Main Hoon Woh Dharti Maa"	Amit Trivedi	Javed Akhtar	

=== 2026 ===
† : indicates songs from unreleased/upcoming films

Film	No	Song	Composer(s)	Lyricist(s)	Co-artist(s)
Koragajja (Dubbed)	965	"Gana Gunjar"	Gopi Sundar	Sudheer Attavar	Armaan Malik
Gandhi Talks	966	"Inqalabi Ziddi"	A.R. Rahman	Kumaar	
Subedaar	967	"Ae Ri Sakhi"	IP Singh, Akshay Raheja	Amir Khusrau, IP Singh	IP Singh
Bhooth Bangla	968	"O Ri O Sanwariya"	Pritam	Yatindra Mishra	Javed Ali, Prithvi Gandharv
The Kerala Story 2 Goes Beyond	969	"O Maayi Ri"	Mannan Shaah	Manoj Muntashir	
Raja Shivaji	970	"Phool Parijaat"	Ajay-Atul	Manoj Muntashir	
Krishnavataram Part 1: The Heart (Hridayam)	971	"Prem Ki Leela"	Prasad S	Irshad Kamil	Javed Ali, Suvarna Tiwari
Krishnavataram Part 1: The Heart (Hridayam)	972	"Mann Ki Dasha"	Prasad S	Irshad Kamil	
Pati Patni Aur Woh Do	973	"Dil Waale Chor"	Rochak Kohli	Kumaar	Aditya Rikhari
Chand Mera Dil	974	"Chand Mera Dil" (Female Version)	Sachin-Jigar	Amitabh Bhattacharya	
Bharat Bhhagya Viddhaata	975	"Nabz Nabz" (Female Version)	Aman Pant	Manoj Tapadia	
The India Story	976	"Gubbara Chaand"	Mangesh Dhakde	Shakeel Azmi	Shaan, Adwita Padhi
Awarapan 2	977	"Tumhare Liye"	Wasif Ahmad	Sachin Urmtosh	
Awarapan 2	978	"Tumhare Liye" (Duet Version)	Wasif Ahmad	Sachin Urmtosh	Aaryam
Mirzapur: The Movie	979	"Vaaroon Forever"	Anand Bhaskar	Ginny Diwan	Romy
Mirzapur: The Movie	980	"Vaaroon Reprise"	Anand Bhaskar	Ginny Diwan	
Jeena Dil Se	981	"Saaton Janam" (Female Version)	Vishal-Akash (Dhaneliya Brothers)	Arafat Mehmood	
Nayyi Navelli	982	"Awadhiya Ke Raja"	G.V. Prakash Kumar	Vayu	
Prahaar: The Untold Story of Ujjwal Nikam	983	"Tujh Mein Basi Meri Jaan"	Pritam	Amitabh Bhattacharya	Sonu Nigam
Ramayana: Part 1	984	"Jai Jai Ram"	A. R. Rahman	Kumar Vishwas	Arijit Singh
Ramayana: Part 1	985	"Mangal Rang"	A. R. Rahman	Kumar Vishwas	Arijit Singh
Ramayana: Part 1	986	"Judi Jodi"	A. R. Rahman	Kumar Vishwas	
Suryaa †	987	"Dhola Ji"	Sudhakar Dutt Sharma	Sunil Sirvaiya	Javed Ali, Swaroop Khan
Suryaa †	988	"Dhola Ji" (Divya Kumar Version)	Sudhakar Dutt Sharma	Sunil Sirvaiya	Divya Kumar, Swaroop Khan
Yeh Prem Mol Liya †	989	"Yeh Prem Mol Liya" (Title Track)	Himesh Reshammiya	Kumaar	Nihal Tauro
Yeh Prem Mol Liya †	990	"Jai Ambe Bol"	Himesh Reshammiya	Mayur Puri	Himesh Reshammiya
Yeh Prem Mol Liya †	991	"Jhumka Patola"	Himesh Reshammiya	Sonia Kapoor Reshammiya	
Yeh Prem Mol Liya †	992	"Saawan Aaya Hai"	Himesh Reshammiya	Mayur Puri	Keshav Anand
Yeh Prem Mol Liya †	993	"Bulaye Chhathi Maa"	Himesh Reshammiya	Manoj Muntashir	Keshav Anand
Gun Maaster G9 †	994	"Do Din Ki Zindagi"	Himesh Reshammiya	Junaid Wasi	Vishal Mishra
Eetha †	995	"Ji Ji Re Ji"	Ajay-Atul	Amitabh Bhattacharya	Ajay Gogavale
Maatrubhumi: May War Rest in Peace †	996	"Maatrubhumi"	Himesh Reshammiya	Sameer Anjaan	Arijit Singh, Master Mani Dharamkot
Maatrubhumi: May War Rest in Peace †	997	"Main Hoon"	Ayaan Lall	Shabbir Ahmed, Ayaan Lall	Ayaan Lall
Maatrubhumi: May War Rest in Peace †	998	"Main Hoon" (Reprise)	Ayaan Lall	Shabbir Ahmed, Ayaan Lall	Ayaan Lall
Maatrubhumi: May War Rest in Peace †	999	"Mera Jee Nahi"	Shamir Tandon, Kumar Gaurav Singh	Shamir Tandon, Vishwadeep Zeest	Vishal Mishra

=== Uncredited Hindi film songs ===
List of Hindi film songs sung by Ghoshal, that were released without her being credited in the soundtrack.

Year	Film	No	Song	Composer(s)	Lyricist(s)	Co-artist(s)
2018	Dhadak	1	"Pehli Baar"	Ajay–Atul	Amitabh Bhattacharya	Ajay Gogavale

=== Unreleased Hindi film songs ===
† : denotes officially unreleased songs
TBA : to be announced

Film	No	Song	Composer(s)	Lyricist(s)	Co-artist(s)
Desi Magic †	1	"Ek Do Teen"	Laxmikant–Pyarelal (Recreated by DJ Aqeel)	Javed Akhtar	
Desi Magic †	2	TBA	Lalit Pandit	TBA	
Dil Mile Na Mile †	3	"Dil Mile Na Mile"	Palash Choudhari	Virender Dahiya	
Gehri Chaal †	4	"Jabse Dekha Hai"	Surinder Sodhi, Rajendra Salil	Naushad, Anwar Sagar, Maan Singh Deep	Udit Narayan
Gehri Chaal †	5	"Aaja Aaja Sajayen"	Surinder Sodhi, Rajendra Salil	Naushad, Anwar Sagar, Maan Singh Deep	Udit Narayan
Gehri Chaal †	6	"Saanson Mein Tum"	Surinder Sodhi, Rajendra Salil	Naushad, Anwar Sagar, Maan Singh Deep	Udit Narayan
Gehri Chaal †	7	"Rah Gayee Apni Chaah"	Surinder Sodhi, Rajendra Salil	Naushad, Anwar Sagar, Maan Singh Deep	
Janta v/s Janardan – Bechara Aam Aadmi †	8	TBA	Aadesh Shrivastava	TBA	
Mohabbat Ho Gayi Hai Tumse †	9	"O Sathiya"	Sanjeev-Darshan	Sameer	Shaan
Shuddhi †	10	TBA	Ajay–Atul	TBA	Udit Narayan
TBA †	11	"Ang Ang Mein"	Sanjeev Thomas	Dr. RMP Shetty	
TBA †	12	"Holi Holi Re Rang Holi"	Sanjeev Thomas	Dr. RMP Shetty	Suresh Wadkar
TBA †	13	"Wah Wah Wah Dil Mere"	Sanjeev Thomas	Dr. RMP Shetty	Udit Narayan
Pareshaanpur †	14	TBA	TBA	TBA	
Dunki †	15	"Durr Kahi Durr"	Pritam	Swanand Kirkire	Shaan
Sarzameen †	16	"Jaan Ve"	Vishal Khurana K	Kausar Munir	

== International collaborations ==
List of international colloaborations by Ghoshal.

Year	Album	Song	Collaborator(s)	Starring	Language(s)
2022	Yule Log Audio	"Invincible"	Pentatonix	N/A	English, Hindi
2023	Guli Mata	"Guli Mata"	Saad Lamjarred	Saad Lamjarred, Jennifer Winget	Arabic, Hindi
2023	Coke Studio	"Sunn Beliya"	Afroto	Afroto, Shreya Ghoshal	Bengali, Egyptian, Hindi
2024	Yimmy Yimmy	"Yimmy Yimmy"	Tayc	Tayc, Jacqueline Fernandez	French, Hindi
2024	Zaalima	"Zaalima"	Dystinct	Dystinct, Mouni Roy	Hindi, Moroccan
2025	Besos	"Besos"	Karl Wine	Shikhar Dhawan, Jacqueline Fernandez	Spanish, Hindi
2025	Oh Mama! Tetema	"Oh Mama! Tetema"	Rayvanny, The Plugz Europe	Rayvanny, Nora Fatehi	Swahili, English, Hindi

== Hindi non-film songs ==
† : indicates songs from Television shows
‡ : indicates songs from OTT/Web Series

Year	Album	No	Song	Composer(s)	Writer(s)	Co-artist(s)
2003	Kkoi Dil Mein Hai †	1	"Kkoi Dil Mein Hai" (Version 1)	Jai Wadia	Nawab Arzoo	Sunidhi Chauhan
2003	Kkoi Dil Mein Hai †	2	"Kkoi Dil Mein Hai" (Version 2)	Jai Wadia	Nawab Arzoo	
2003	Son Pari †	3	"Son Pari"	Raghunath Seth	Gulzar	
2004	Tera Mera Pyar	4	"Yeh Kya Hua"	Partners In Rhyme	Praveen Bhardwaj	
2004	Tera Mera Pyar	5	"Pyar Ki Baatein"	Partners In Rhyme	Praveen Bhardwaj	
2004	Tera Mera Pyar	6	"Dil Mere"	Partners In Rhyme	Praveen Bhardwaj	Shurjo Bhattacharya
2004	Tera Mera Pyar	7	"Mujhe Seene"	Partners In Rhyme	Praveen Bhardwaj	Precha, Spike
2004	Princess Dollie Aur Uska Magic Bag †	8	"Hello Dollie"	Akash Sagar	Sharmistha Mukherjee	
2004	Reth †	9	"Reth"	Aashish Rego, K C Loy, Vivek Rajgopalan	Manoj Muntashir	
2004	Ye Meri Life Hai †	10	"Ye Meri Life Hai"	Pritam	Subrat Sinha	
2004	Kesar †	11	"Kesar"	Anand Raj Anand	Dev Kohli	
2005	Bhabhi †	12	"Rang Mile"	Anand Sharma	Rajesh Beri	
2005	Kituu Sabb Jaantii Hai †	13	"Kituu Sabb Jaantii Hai"	Daniel B. George	Sanjay Prakash	
2005	Saat Phere: Saloni Ka Safar †	14	"Saat Pheron Mein" (Title Track)	Lalit Sen	Rajesh Reddy	
2006	Shree Ganesh Dhun	15	"Shree Ganesh Dhun"	J. S. R. Madhukar	Rasikant Hitshri	
2006	Geet Govind: Songs of Eternal Love	16	"Is Basant Mein Girdhar Vihare"	Pandit Jasraj	Jayadeva	Mahalakshmi Iyer
2006	Geet Govind: Songs of Eternal Love	17	"Mand Samiran Yamuna Tatpar Path Nirkhe"	Pandit Jasraj	Jayadeva	Mahalakshmi Iyer
2006	Geet Govind: Songs of Eternal Love	18	"Mat Kar Maan Kanha Sau Maninee"	Pandit Jasraj	Jayadeva	Mahalakshmi Iyer
2006	Geet Govind: Songs of Eternal Love	19	"Natavar Nagar Raas Rasikvar"	Pandit Jasraj	Jayadeva	Mahalakshmi Iyer
2006	Geet Govind: Songs of Eternal Love	20	"Radha Mohan Hue Ek Ras"	Pandit Jasraj	Jayadeva	Mahalakshmi Iyer
2006	HIV Awareness Special	21	"Haath Se Haath Mila"	Shankar–Ehsaan–Loy	Javed Akhtar	Sonu Nigam
2006	Ustad & the Divas	22	"Leja Leja"	Sandesh Shandilya	Irshad Kamil	Ustad Sultan Khan
2006	Ustad & the Divas	23	"Leja Leja" (Club Mix Version)	Sandesh Shandilya	Irshad Kamil	Ustad Sultan Khan
2006	Ustad & the Divas	24	"Leja Leja" (Raggaeton Mix Version)	Sandesh Shandilya	Irshad Kamil	Ustad Sultan Khan
2006	Kyaa Hoga Nimmo Kaa †	25	"Ankhon Me Pyaare Pyaare" (Title Track)	Lalit Sen	Nawab Arzoo	
2006	Dharti Ka Veer Yodha Prithviraj Chauhan †	26	"Sunn Re Megha"	Ravindra Jain		Udit Narayan
2006	Stree... Teri Kahaani †	27	"Stree... Teri Kahaani"	Shaheen		
2006	Mamta †	28	"Zindagi Mere Saath Chal" (Title Track)	Uttank Vora	Nawab Arzoo	
2006	Saathii Re †	29	"Saathii Re"	Lalit Sen	Rekha Reddy	
2006	Solhah Singaarr †	30	"Solhah Singaarr"	Lalit Sen	Nawab Arzoo	
2007	Ustad Sultan Khan & Friends: Yaad Piya Ki Aayi	31	"Jhanki Laagi Chhaon Ki"	Suhel Khan	Jameel Mujahid	Ustad Sultan Khan, Suhel Khan
2007	Ustad Sultan Khan & Friends: Yaad Piya Ki Aayi	32	"Maula"	Suhel Khan	Jameel Mujahid	Sadhana Sargam, Suhel Khan
2007	Ustad Sultan Khan & Friends: Yaad Piya Ki Aayi	33	"Maahi"	Suhel Khan	Jameel Mujahid	Sadhana Sargam, Suhel Khan
2007	Kasturi †	34	"Kasturi"	Lalit Sen	Nawab Arzoo	
2007	Jiya Jale †	35	"Jiya Jale"	Gaurav Issar	Swanand Kirkire	
2007	Dhoom Machaao Dhoom †	36	"Dhoom Machaao Dhoom"	—N/a		
2008	Nuit Blanche: Shaad Ali and the Bollywood Bawaal	37	"Laagi Re"	Pyarelal	Gulzar	Sonu Nigam
2008	Hey Bramha Ki Mansi.... Gyan Do	38	"Hey Bramha Ki Mansi...."	Gufi Paintal	Chaitanya Mahaprabhu	Ameya Date, Sushil Kumar
2008	Hey Bramha Ki Mansi.... Gyan Do	39	"Jholi Bhar Bhar Dalo Abhir Gulal"	Gufi Paintal	Chaitanya Mahaprabhu	Babul Supriyo, Satish Dehra, Pamela Jain
2009	Star Parivaar Awards †	40	"Star Parivaar" (Palkon Pe Baithe Rahe)	—N/a		Shaan
2009	Yahan Main Ghar Ghar Kheli †	41	"Yahaaan Main Ghar Ghar Kheli"	Navin-Manish	Irshad Kamil	
2009	Yahan Main Ghar Ghar Kheli †	42	"Yahaaan Main Ghar Ghar Kheli" (Sargam Version)	Navin-Manish	Irshad Kamil	
2009	Yahan Main Ghar Ghar Kheli †	43	"Swarn Aabha Happy Theme"	Navin-Manish	Irshad Kamil	
2010	Star Plus Anthem †	44	"Rishta Wahi, Soch Nayi"	Shankar–Ehsaan–Loy	Piyush Pandey	
2010	Star Parivaar Awards †	45	"Star Parivaar" (Chali Chali Khushiyon Ki Phir Se)	—N/a		KK
2010	Phir Mile Sur Mera Tumhara	46	"Phir Mile Sur Mera Tumhara"	Ashok Patki (Recreated by Louis Banks)	Piyush Pandey	Gurdas Maan, Shaan, Kavita Krishnamurthy, KJ Yesudas, Vijay Yesudas, Sonu Nigam
2010	Krishna Sakha	47	"Nanda Ka Laala"	Abhijeet Arun	Ajay Jhingran	
2010	Krishna Sakha	48	"Maiyya Yasoda Tera Kanhaiyya"	Abhijeet Arun	Ajay Jhingran	
2010	Krishna Sakha	49	"Mat Roko Dagar Mere Shyam"	Abhijeet Arun	Ajay Jhingran	
2011	Aao Sai	50	"Aao Sai Mere Paas"	Chandra Bhanu Satpathy		
2011	Le Uda Dil	51	"Aise Nahi Jiya Lage"	Laxmi-Vasant	Laxmi Narayan	Javed Ali
2011	Le Uda Dil	52	"Piya Meethi Lage"	Laxmi-Vasant	Laxmi Narayan	Pratik Agarwal
2011	Star Parivaar Awards †	53	"Star Parivaar" (Khwaishen Khol Do Udne Do)	—N/a		Mohit Chauhan
2011	Ek Hazaaron Mein Meri Behna Hai †	54	"Ek Hazaaron Mein Meri Behna Hai"	R. D. Burman (Recreated by Nirmala John)	Anand Bakshi	
2011	Meri Maa †	55	"Geeli Aankhen Puche Tu Kahan" (Title Track)	Jeet Gannguli	Sanjeev Tiwari	
2011	Bade Achhe Lagte Hain †	56	"Bade Achhe Lagte Hain"	R. D. Burman (Recreated by Lalit Sen)	Anand Bakshi (Edited by Nawab Arzoo)	Trijayh Dey
2013	Sony Project Resound	57	"Naina Chaar"	Kailash Kher		
2013	Live Again	58	"Live Again"	Agam	Sachin Grover	
2013	Saraswatichandra †	59	"Kuch Na Kahe" (Title Track)	Sanjay Leela Bhansali	Siddharth–Garima	Javed Ali
2014	Humnasheen	60	"Ye Aasmaan"	Deepak Pandit	Manoj Muntashir	
2014	Humnasheen	61	"Yeh Dil Jo Pyarka"	Deepak Pandit	Manoj Muntashir	
2014	Humnasheen	62	"Maahi Rokna Aaj" (Geet)	Deepak Pandit	Manoj Muntashir	
2014	Humnasheen	63	"Teri Talash"	Deepak Pandit	Manoj Muntashir	
2014	Humnasheen	64	"Shamma Jalti Rahi" (Nazam)	Deepak Pandit	Manoj Muntashir	
2014	Humnasheen	65	"Kuchh Rishtey"	Deepak Pandit	Ajay Jhingran (Additional lyrics by Manoj Muntashir)	
2014	Humnasheen	66	"Naam Likh Kar"	Deepak Pandit	Vaibhav Modi	
2014	Humnasheen	67	"Raaton Ko"	Deepak Pandit	Ahmad Anees	
2014	Women's Day Special: Spreading Melodies Everywhere	68	"Naa Hum Jo Kah De"	Ram Shankar	A. K. Mishra	Udit Narayan
2014	Back 2 Love	69	"Rim Jhim"	Sahir Ali Bagga	Yousuf Salahuddin	Rahat Fateh Ali Khan
2014	Lalbaugcha Raja	70	"Chahoo Aur Tumhara Gunjan Hai"	Kedar Pandit	Nachiket Jog	
2014	Raunaq	71	"Kismat Se"	A. R. Rahman	Kapil Sibal	
2014	Moments of Love: Pyar Ke Do Pal	72	"Piya Aise To Na The"	Shushat–Shankar	Basant Chaudhary	
2014	Moments of Love: Pyar Ke Do Pal	73	"Chahaton Se Zyada"	Shushat–Shankar	Basant Chaudhary	
2015	2015 National Games Anthem	74	"Get Set Play"	Hariharan	Javed Akhtar	Hariharan, K. J. Yesudas, Salim Merchant, Benny Dayal, Shweta Mohan, Akshay Hariharan
2015	Mamta Ki Chhaon Mein	75	"Bhor"	Awnish Khare	Shrikant Mishra	
2015	Bahaaron Ki Tamanna	76	"Bahaaron Ki Tamanna"	Ramesh Roshan	Indra Narayan Rai	Pankaj Kumar
2016	Pyaasi-Pyaasi	77	"Pyaasi-Pyaasi"	Abhishek Ray	Gulzar	
2016	Hasna Mera Kaam Hasana Mera Kaam	78	"Hasna Mera Kaam Hasana Mera Kaam"	Salim–Sulaiman	Bindeshwar Pathak	Udit Narayan
2016	Habib Ke Naghme	79	"Mere Dil Mein"	Deepak Pandit	Habib Tanvir	
2016	Sarnang	80	"Pragati Ki Raah Dikhayee"	Rajesh Dhabre		
2016	Shri Ram Stuti	81	"Shri Ramchandra Krupalu"	Pushpa-Arun Adhikari	Tulsidas	
2016	Gulzar In Conversation With Tagore	82	"Singaar Ko Rehne Do"	Shantanu Moitra	Rabindranath Tagore (Additional lyrics by Gulzar)	Gulzar
2016	Gulzar In Conversation With Tagore	83	"Main Wohi Hoon"	Shantanu Moitra	Rabindranath Tagore (Additional lyrics by Gulzar)	Gulzar
2016	Gulzar In Conversation With Tagore	84	"O Sakhi Sun"	Shantanu Moitra	Rabindranath Tagore (Additional lyrics by Gulzar)	Gulzar
2016	Gulzar In Conversation With Tagore	85	"Maine Toh Kuch"	Shantanu Moitra	Rabindranath Tagore (Additional lyrics by Gulzar)	Gulzar
2016	Gulzar In Conversation With Tagore	86	"Main Ghoomta Hoon"	Shantanu Moitra	Rabindranath Tagore (Additional lyrics by Gulzar)	Shaan, Gulzar
2016	Gulzar In Conversation With Tagore	87	"Bujh Gaya Tha Kyun Diya"	Shantanu Moitra	Rabindranath Tagore (Additional lyrics by Gulzar)	Shaan, Gulzar
2016	Gulzar In Conversation With Tagore	88	"Dono Behne"	Shantanu Moitra	Rabindranath Tagore (Additional lyrics by Gulzar)	Shaan, Gulzar
2016	Aye Jahaan Aasmaan	89	"Aye Jahaan Aasmaan"	Abhishek Ray	Nusrat Badr	Sonu Nigam
2016	Baba Kedar ‡	90	"Jai Jai Kedara"	Kailash Kher		Amitabh Bachchan, Kailash Kher, Suresh Wadkar, Sonu Nigam, Shankar Mahadevan, Shaan, Arijit Singh, Babul Supriyo, Anup Jalota, Hema Malini, Prasoon Joshi, Sivamani Anandan
2016	Sony Entertainment Television Anthem †	91	"Naya Sangeet"	Ajay–Atul	Prasoon Joshi	Sonu Nigam
2017	Shiv Shakti Sansar	92	"Aum Gam Ganpate Namahe"	Kedar Pandit		
2017	Mahavir Stuti	93	"Kya Jaane Saanson Ka Panchhi"	Ashok Patki	Yogesh	
2017	Namami Brahmaputra	94	"Namami Brahmaputra" (Hindi Version)	Papon	Swanand Kirkire	Amitabh Bachchan, Papon, Arijit Singh, Shankar Mahadevan, Kailash Kher, Shubha Mudgal, Sonu Nigam, Vishal Dadlani, Shekhar Ravjiani, Zubeen Garg, Shillong Chamber Choir, Usha Uthup, Shaan, Harshdeep Kaur
2017	Jiya Bekaraar	95	"Jiya Bekaraar"	Sushant-Shankar	Basant Chaudhary	Dine Khan
2017	Bas Itni Si Shikayat Hai	96	"Bas Itni Si Shikayat Hai"	Arvinder Singh	Madan Pal	
2017	Humko Apne Paagalpan Se	97	"Humko Apne Paagalpan Se"	Arvinder Singh	Madan Pal	Arvinder Singh
2017	T-Series Mixtape: Season 1	98	"Sunn Raha Hai - Rozana"	Abhijit Vaghani	Sandeep Nath, Manoj Muntashir	
2017	Dhadkane Azad Hain	99	"Dhadkane Azad Hain"	Deepak Pandit	Manoj Muntashir	
2017	Swachh Survekshan: 2018	100	"Swachhata Ki Jyot Jagi Hai"	Shankar–Ehsaan–Loy	Prasoon Joshi	Babul Supriyo, Udit Narayan, Alka Yagnik, Shaan Kailash Kher, Akriti Kakkar, Amitabh Bachhan, Sachin Tendulkar, Shaan Banerjee
2017	Shivoham	101	"Somnatham Sharanam"	Kailash Kher		
2017	Sun Raha	102	"Sun Raha"	Ankit Tiwari (Recreated by Sunit Music)	Sandeep Nath (Additional lyrics by Raxstar)	Raxstar
2017	Jiya Jaye	103	"Jiya Jaye Na"	Euphoria	Palash Sen, Deekshant Sahrawat	Palash Sen
2017	IFFCO Anthem	104	"IFFCO" (Hindi Version)	Shankar–Ehsaan–Loy	Shashank Khandelwal	Shankar Mahadevan
2017	MTV Unplugged: Season 6 †	105	"Sunn Raha Hai" (Sufi Version)	Ankit Tiwari	Sandeep Nath	
2017	MTV Unplugged: Season 6 †	106	"Mohe Rang Do Laal" (Unplugged)	Sanjay Leela Bhansali	Siddharth-Garima	
2017	MTV Unplugged: Season 6 †	107	"Rasm-e-Ulfat" (Unplugged)	Madan Mohan	Naqsh Lyallpuri	
2017	MTV Unplugged: Season 6 †	108	"Leja Leja Re" (Unplugged)	Sandesh Shandilya	Irshad Kamil	
2017	MTV Unplugged: Season 6 †	109	"Agar Tum Mil Jao" (Unplugged)	Nashad	Tasleem Fazli	
2017	MTV Unplugged: Season 6 †	110	"Deewani Mastani" (Unplugged)	Sanjay Leela Bhansali	Siddharth-Garima	
2017	Zee TV Anthem †	111	"Aaj Likhenge Kal"	Vishal Bhardwaj	Srijan Shukla	
2018	Tere Bina	112	"Tere Bina"	Deepak Pandit	Traditional	
2018	Earth Voices	113	"Earth Voices"	Abhishek Ray		
2018	Sochona Rokona	114	"Sochona Rokona"	Abhishek Ray	Syed Gulrez, Manvendra	Abhishek Ray
2018	Aye Jahaan Aasmaan	115	"Aye Jahaan Aasmaan" (Trance Reprise)	Abhishek Ray	Nusrat Badr	Abhishek Ray
2018	Mere Desh Ki Zameen	116	"Mere Desh Ki Zameen"	Clinton Cerejo	Prasoon Joshi	Sunidhi Chauhan, Vishal Dadlani, Benny Dayal, Clinton Cerejo
2018	India Respect Chahta Hai	117	"India Respect Chahta Hai"	Aanand Shandilyaa, Sachin Chauhan	Kumar Manjul	Shaan, Sonu Nigam, Shankar Mahadevan, Master Shyam, Yasoob Ali
2018	Likh Likh Ke Tera Naam	118	"Likh Likh Ke Tera Naam"	GI Ganapati		Srijit
2018	Jismojaan	119	"Jismojaan"	Abhishek Ray	Syed Gulrez	Abhishek Ray
2018	Broken But Beautiful ‡	120	"Yeh Kya Hua"	Rana Mazumder	Amitabh Bhattacharya	Dev Negi
2019	Raat Mujhe	121	"Raat Mujhe" (Unplugged)	Abhishek Ray	Sandeep Nath	
2019	T-Series Mixtape: Season 2	122	"Tum Hi Ho - Rehuma"	Abhijit Vaghani	Mithoon, Manoj Muntashir, Sagar Lahauri	Armaan Malik
2019	Lady	123	"Lady"	Abhishek Ray	Abhishek Ray	
2019	Meghaa	124	"Meghaa"	Abhishek Ray	Gulzar	Abhishek Ray
2019	No. 1 Yaari Jam ‡	125	"Imaan Ka Asar" (Unplugged)	Salim–Sulaiman	Mir Ali Husain	Sunidhi Chauhan
2019	The Family Man ‡	126	"Dega Jaan"	Sachin–Jigar	Jigar Saraiya, Mellow D	Mellow D
2020	Mann Bheetar	127	"Bhari Bhari"	Rajeev Mahavir, Pt. Birju Maharaj	Pt. Birju Maharaj	
2020	Mann Bheetar	128	"Mann Bheetar"	Rajeev Mahavir, Pt. Birju Maharaj	Pt. Birju Maharaj	
2020	Nah Woh Main	129	"Nah Woh Main"	Soumyadeep Ghoshal, Shreya Ghoshal	Manoj Yadav	
2020	Kho Gaye Kahan Tum	130	"Kho Gaye Kahan Tum"	Vickey Prasad	Sanjay Dhoopa Mishra	
2020	Aashna Ban Jaayein (Women's Day Special)	131	"Aashna Ban Jaayein"	Vasuda Sharma	Anjali Sharma	Aditi Paul, Akriti Kakar, Anusha Mani, Neeti Mohan, Nirmika Singh, Shannon Donald, Shashaa Tirupati, Shruti Pathak, Shubhangi Joshi, Suzanne D'Mello, Vasuda Sharma, Warsha Easwar
2020	Yeh Hai Stree	132	"Yeh Hai Stree"	Sowmya Raoh, Jim Satya	Vickie Bhattacharya	Shankar Mahadevan, Shaan, Mahalaxmi Iyer, Vishal Dadlani, Aditya Narayan, Neha Kakkar, Sowmya Raoh
2020	Ek India	133	"Ek India"	Lesle Lewis		Shaan, Bappi Lahiri, Lesle Lewis, Benny Dayal, Shilpa Rao, Bhoomi Trivedi, Kavyaa Jones
2020	Atrangi	134	"Atrangi"	Abhishek Ray		
2020	Guzar Jayega	135	"Guzar Jayega"	Jazim Sharma	Siddhant Kaushal	
2020	Together in Isolation	136	"Doori Me Bhi Hum Paas Hai"	Sameer Phaterpekar	Sameer Anjaan	Sonu Nigam
2020	Apni Maati	137	"Apni Maati"	Shantanu Moitra	Swanand Kirkire	
2020	Vande Mataram	138	"Vande Mataram"	L. Subramaniam	Kavita Krishnamurthy	Hema Malini, Mohanlal, Juhi Chawla, Esha Deol, S. P. Balasubrahmanyam, Kavita Krishnamurthy, Hariharan, Kumar Sanu, Sonu Nigam, Bindu Subramaniam, Narayana Subramaniam, Mahati Subramaniam
2020	Betiyan Pride of Nation	139	"Betiyan"	Nisschal Zaveri	Raqueeb Alam	Neeti Mohan, Shalmali Kholgade, Palak Muchhal, Amruta Fadnavis
2020	Judaiyaan	140	"Judaiyaan" (Title Track)	Darshan Raval	Rashmi Virag	Darshan Raval
2020	9XM's Navaratri Special Track	141	"Jab Jab Navaratri Aaye"	Raaj Aashoo	Murli Agarwal	
2020	Sampoorna Diwali Aarti	142	"Sampoorna Diwali Aarti"	Shreyas Puranik	Traditional	
2020	Aao Sunaaye	143	"Aao Sunaaye"	Mani Shankar	Sudhakar Sharma	Shoma Banerjee
2020	Bhoomi 2020	144	"Muraliya"	Salim–Sulaiman	Shraddha Pandit	
2021	Wanderer	145	"Wanderer"	Abhishek Ray	Abhishek Ray	Abhishek Ray
2021	Angana Morey	146	"Angana Morey"	Soumyadeep Ghoshal, Shreya Ghoshal		
2021	Songs of Love	147	"Lagan Laagi Re"	Amit Trivedi	Shellee	Kavita Seth
2021	Oh Sanam	148	"Oh Sanam"	Tony Kakkar		
2021	Meri Pukaar Suno	149	"Meri Pukaar Suno"	A. R. Rahman	Gulzar	K. S. Chithra, Sadhana Sargam, Alka Yagnik, Armaan Malik, Shashaa Tirupati, Asees Kaur
2021	Pyaar Ek Tarfaa	150	"Pyaar Ek Tarfaa"	Amaal Mallik	Manoj Muntashir	Amaal Mallik
2021	Habit	151	"Habit"	Arko Pravo Mukherjee	Kumaar	Arko Pravo Mukherjee
2021	Pyaar Karte Ho Na	152	"Pyaar Karte Ho Na"	Javed-Mohsin	Danish Sabri	Stebin Ben
2021	7 Kadam ‡	153	"Ore Mon"	Raajiv Mitra	Amitabh Varma	Keshav Kumar
2021	7 Kadam ‡	154	"Rehenuma"	Raajiv Mitra, Aakash Mitra	Amitabh Varma	Shafqat Amanat Ali
2021	Zindagi Mere Ghar Aana †	155	"Zindagi Mere Ghar Aana"	Jaidev (Recreated by Tapas Relia)	Sudarshan Faakir	
2022	Uff	156	"Uff"	Shreyas Puranik	Kumaar	
2022	Baarish Aayi Hai	158	"Baarish Aayi Hai"	Javed–Mohsin	Kunaal Vermaa	Stebin Ben
2022	Bhoomi 2022	159	"Laut Aa Mere Des"	Salim–Sulaiman	Shraddha Pandit	Sattar Khan Langa
2022	Jaya Hey 2.0	160	"Jaya Hey"	Rabindranath Tagore (Recreated by Sourendro-Soumyojit)		
2022	Zara Paas To Baitho	161	"Zara Paas To Baitho"	Rajiv-Mona	Ravi Basnet	
2022	Sukoon	162	"Tujhe Bhi Chand"	Sanjay Leela Bhansali	Siddharth-Garima	
2022	Sukoon	163	"Qaraar"	Sanjay Leela Bhansali	Momin Khan Momin	
2023	Rang Le Rangeela	164	"Rang Le Rangeela"	Deepak Pandit	Manoj Muntashir	
2023	Sohnneyaa	165	"Sohnneyaa"	Ravi Singhal	Kunaal Vermaa	Laqshay Kapoor
2023	Zihaal e Miskin	166	"Zihaal e Miskin"	Laxmikant-Pyarelal (Recreated by Javed-Mohsin)	Gulzar (Additional lyrics by Kunaal Vermaa)	Vishal Mishra
2023	Barsaat Aa Gayi	167	"Barsaat Aa Gayi"	Javed-Mohsin	Kunaal Vermaa	Stebin Ben
2023	Guli Mata	168	"Guli Mata"	Mehdi Mozayine, Rajat Nagpal	Mohamed EI Maghribi, Rana Sotal	Saad Lamjarred
2023	Jaanam	169	"Jaanam"	Lalit Sen	Dax Patel	
2023	Jee Bhar Ke Tum	170	"Jee Bhar Ke Tum"	Javed–Mohsin	Rashmi Virag	
2023	Coke Studio	171	"Sunn Beliya"	Kaushik-Guddu	Rashmi Virag	Afroto
2023	Sultan of Delhi ‡	172	"Tujh Pe Dil Haar Ke"	Amaal Mallik	Kunaal Vermaa	Armaan Malik
2023	Sultan of Delhi ‡	173	"Tujh Pe Dil Haar Ke" (Lofi Mix)	Amaal Mallik	Kunaal Vermaa	
2023	Sukh Karta Dukh Harta	174	"Sukh Karta Dukh Harta"	Salim-Sulaiman	Traditional	
2023	Baarish Ke Aane Se	175	"Baarish Ke Aane Se"	Tony Kakkar	Tony Kakkar, Prince Dubey	Tony Kakkar
2023	Vaari Vaari	176	"Vaari Vaari"	Shekhar Ravjiani	Avinash Chouhan	Shekhar Ravjiani
2023	Ek Mulaqaat	177	"Ek Mulaqaat"	Javed-Mohsin	Rashmi Virag, Sameer Anjaan	Vishal Mishra
2023	Aap Ke Khatir	178	"Aap Ke Khatir"	Aadesh Shrivastava	Nusrat Badr	
2023	Sohnneyaa	179	"Sohnneyaa" (The Wedding Version)	Ravi Singhal	Kunaal Vermaa	Laqshay Kapoor
2024	Tu Meri Hai	180	"Tu Meri Hai"	Sachin-Jigar	Priya Saraiya	Jigar Saraiya
2024	Vishwambhari Stuti	181	"Vishwambhari Stuti"	Ajay-Atul	Traditional	
2024	Shankaraay	182	"Shankaraay"	Salim–Sulaiman	Shraddha Pandit	
2024	Yimmy Yimmy	183	"Yimmy Yimmy"	Rajat Nagpal, Nyadjiko, Tayc	Tayc, Rana Sotal	Tayc
2024	Zihaal e Miskin	184	"Zihaal e Miskin" (Acoustic Version)	Laxmikant-Pyarelal (Recreated by Javed-Mohsin)	Gulzar (Additional lyrics by Kunaal Vermaa)	
2024	Ek To Madmast Jawani	185	"Ek To Madmast Jawani"	Rajib Mona	Sudhakar Sharma	Udit Narayan
2024	Jay Jay Kedara	186	"Jay Jay Kedara"	Kailash Kher		Arijit Singh, Kailash Kher, Amitabh Bachchan, Shaan, Sonu Nigam, Shankar Mahadevan, Hema Malini, Suresh Wadkar, Prasoon Joshi, Anup Jalota, Babul Supriyo, Anandam Sivamani
2024	Heeramandi ‡	187	"Chaudhavi Shab"	Sanjay Leela Bhansali	A. M. Turaz	
2024	The Period Song (Whisper's Social Campaign)	188	"The Period Song"	Aman Pant	N/A	
2024	Zaalima	189	"Zaalima"	Rajat Nagpal, Yassine Alaoui Mdaghri, Joao Lima Pinto	Mbarek Nouali, Iliass Mansouri, Bryan Mumvudi, Rana Sotal	Dystinct
2024	World Environment Day 2024 Anthem	190	"Bhoomi Namaskar"	Aman Pant	Prasoon Joshi	Neeti Mohan, Shankar Mahadevan, Shaan, Shekhar Ravjiani, Aman Pant
2024	Kaise Jiyein	191	"Kaise Jiyein"	Deepak Pandit	Panchhi Jalonvi	Sameer Pandit
2024	Tribhuvan Mishra CA Topper ‡	192	"Duur Hue"	Ram Sampath	Puneet Krishna	
2024	Kanhaiya Gopala (Janmashtami Special)	193	"Kanhaiya Gopala"	Salim–Sulaiman	Shraddha Pandit	
2024	Bas Kaafi Hai	194	"Bas Kaafi Hai"	Shekhar Ravjiani	Manoj Yadav	Shekhar Ravjiani
2024	Bhoomi 2024	195	"Chhaila"	Salim–Sulaiman	Shraddha Pandit	Sunidhi Chauhan
2024	Coke Studio Bharat: Season 2	196	"Re Mann"	Swanand Kirkire		
2024	Andaz	197	"Andaz"	Ram Sampath	Javed Akhtar	Mika Singh
2025	Aayiye Ram Ji	198	"Aayiye Ram Ji"	B. Praak	Jaani	
2025	Saraswati Vandana	199	"Saraswati Vandana"	Shreya Ghoshal, Kinjal Chatterjee	Traditional	
2025	Jai Jai Baba	200	"Jai Jai Baba"	Milan Harish	Sunderdan Detha	Harish
2025	Namo Shankara	201	"Namo Shankara"	Kinjal Chatterjee, Shreya Ghoshal	Shraddha Pandit	
2025	Pyaar Aata Hai	202	"Pyaar Aata Hai"	Rajat Nagpal	Rana Sotal	Rito Riba
2025	Chhora Pardesi	203	"Chhora Pardesi"	Salim–Sulaiman	Kumaar	
2025	Hanuman Chalisa	204	"Hanuman Chalisa"	Salim–Sulaiman	Traditional	
2025	Jai Hanuman	205	"Jai Hanuman"	Kinjal Chatterjee	Shraddha Pandit	Kinjal Chatterjee, Mir Desai
2025	Besos	206	"Besos"	Rajat Nagpal, Freebot, Karl Wine	Rana Sotal, Freebot, Karl Wine	Karl Wine
2025	Thodi Si Daaru	207	"Thodi Si Daaru"	AP Dhillon, Luca Mauti	Shinda Kahlon	AP Dhillon
2025	Oh Mama! Tetema	208	"Oh Mama! Tetema"	Rayvanny, Vishal Mishra	Rayvanny, Vishal Mishra, Nora Fatehi, The Plugz Europe	Rayvanny, Nora Fatehi
2025	O Kanha Re	209	"O Kanha Re"	Shreyas Puranik	Saaveri Verma	
2025	Ganesha Pancharatnam	210	"Ganesha Pancharatnam"	Kinjal Chatterjee, Shreya Ghoshal	Traditional	
2025	Bring It Home (ICC Women's Cricket World Cup 2025)	211	"Bring It Home"	Nakul Abhyankar	Raqueeb Alam, Nazeef Mohammed	
2025	Ishq Badariya	212	"Ishq Badariya"	Laxmi Narayan		Prakash Desai
2025	Bhoomi 2025	213	"Pehle Kyun Na Mile"	Salim–Sulaiman	Shraddha Pandit	Papon
2025	Swachhotsav Anthem 2025	214	"Desh Ye Tyahaaron"	Amit Trivedi	Shailendra Singh Sodhi (Shellee)	Amit Trivedi
2026	77th Republic Day Parade (Ministry of Information and Broadcasting Theme)	215	"Bharat Gatha" (Shruti, Kriti, Drishti)	Hesham Abdul Wahab		
2026	Yahin Guzaar Doon	216	"Yahin Guzaar Doon"	Amaal Mallik	Kunaal Vermaa	Amaal Mallik
2026	Raja Hindustani	217	"Haal e Dil"	King, NEVERSOBER	King	
2026	Laut Ke Aa (Goongoonalo App)	218	"Laut Ke Aa"	Mannan Shaah	Javed Akhtar	
2026	Siddha Bhajo	219	"Siddha Bhajo"	Traditional		
2026	Bhoomi Namaskar 2.0 (World Environment Day 2026)	220	"Bhoomi Namaskar"	Aman Pant	Prasoon Joshi	Neeti Mohan, Shankar Mahadevan, Shaan, Shekhar Ravjiani, Aman Pant
2026	Pritam and Pedro ‡	221	"Maafi"	Shantanu Moitra	Swanand Kirkire	
2026	Kalyani (Malabar Gold and Diamonds)	222	"Kalyani" (Remix)	ARJN, KDS, FIFTY4	Suhas Moideen, FIFTY4, Pulkit Sharma	RONN, Keshav Tyohar, Ashbin Paulson
2026	The Great Indian Musical: Civilization To Nation	223	"Magan Hui Meera"	Ajay-Atul	Traditional	
2026	The Great Indian Musical: Civilization To Nation	224	"Raghupati Raghav"	Ajay-Atul	Traditional	
2026	Bairi Piya	225	"Bairi Piya"	Anurag Mishra	Alok Ranjan Srivastava, Anurag Mishra	
2026	Bhoomi 2026	226	"Tu Hi Wajah"	Salim–Sulaiman, Shraddha Pandit	Kumaar	
2026	Mahiya	227	"Mahiya"	Badshah		
2026	Between Distances	228	"Nazr-E-Karam"	Aditya Rikhari		

== Angika songs ==
Year	Film	Song	Composer(s)	Lyricist(s)	Co-artist(s)
2007	Khagadiya Wali Bhauji	"Ho Raja Kariyechhi Hum Tore Se Pyaar"	Arvind Jha, Pawan Muradpuri, S. Paul	S. Kumar, Badri Prasad, Ikhlas	Udit Narayan

== Assamese songs ==
Year	Film/Album	Song	Composer(s)	Lyricist(s)	Co-artist(s)
2005	Aaya Bihu Jhoomke	"Mere Liye"	Dony Hazarika	N/A	Roop Kumar Rathod
2005	Aaya Bihu Jhoomke	"Suno Suno"	Dony Hazarika	N/A	Roop Kumar Rathod
2006	Meghor Aare Aare	"Dorodi Dorodi"			
2011	Raamdhenu	"Rang Diya Morom"	Jatin Sharma	Diganta Bharati	Zubeen Garg
2012	Endhare Endhare	"Endhare Endhare"	Prasenjit Lahon	Hiren Bhattacharyya	
2022	Koi Nidiya Kiyaw	"Koi Nidiya Kiyaw"	Keshab Nayan		Papon

== English songs ==
- This list includes even the songs in different languages by Ghoshal used in English movies.

Year	Film	Song	Composer(s)	Lyricist(s)	Co-artist(s)
2007	The Great Indian Butterfly	"Kangana" (Female Version)	Deepak Pandit	Manoj Muntashir	
2007	The Great Indian Butterfly	"Meera" (Maine Lio Govind Naam)	Deepak Pandit	Jaideep Sahni	
2010	When Harry Tries to Marry	"Aao Naache Gaaye"	Siddharth Kasyap	Ibrahim `Ashk'	Rishikesh Kamerkar
2011	Dam 999	"Mujhe Chod Ke" (Female Version)	Ouseppachan	Sohan Roy	
2012	A Gran Plan	"Zindagi Sataaegi"	Kabir Singh, Kaizad Gherda	Jaideep Sahni	
2015	The Second Best Exotic Marigold Hotel	"Yeh Ishq Haye"	Pritam (Re-used by Thomas Newman)	Irshad Kamil	
2015	The Second Best Exotic Marigold Hotel	"Balma"	Himesh Reshammiya (Re-used by Thomas Newman)	Sameer	Sreerama Chandra
2017	Viceroy's House (Dubbed as Partition: 1947 in Hindi)	"Do Dilon Ke"	A. R. Rahman	Navneet Virk	Hariharan

== French songs ==
Year	Film	Song	Composer(s)	Lyricist(s)	Co-artist(s)
2004	Pascal of Bollywood	"Johnny D'Jono" (Jane Jana)	Pyarelal	Pascal of Bollywood	Pascal Heni
2004	Pascal of Bollywood	"La Vie En Rose.... Indien"	Pyarelal	Nida Fazli	Pascal Heni

== Gujarati songs ==
Year	Film	Song	Composer(s)	Lyricist(s)	Co-artist(s)
2005	Love Is Blind	"Manma Mara Manma"	Kardam Thaker	Sandip Patel	Shaan
2005	Love Is Blind	"Bandh Ankho Ma"	Kardam Thaker	Sandip Patel	Shaan
2005	Hastakshar (Volume 6)	"Aaj Maru Man Manena"	Shyamal-Saumil	Umashankar Joshi	
2016	Romance Complicated	"Maahi"	Jatin-Pratik	Dashrath Mewal	
2018	Natsamrat	"Jat Jao"	Alap Desai	Dilip Rawal	Alap Deasi

=== Gujarati non-film songs ===
Year	Film	Song	Composer(s)	Lyricist(s)	Co-artist(s)
2025	Vaarso (Season 3)	"Mara Hari Ne"	Traditional, Priya Saraiya		Bhavna Labadiya

== Nepali songs ==
Year	Film	Song	Composer(s)	Lyricist(s)	Co-artist(s)
2006	Dhadhkan	"Nachcha Yo Mann Kina Kina"	Suresh Adhikari		Udit Narayan
2011	Only Love	"Chhaechha Basanta"	Nhyoo Bajracharya	Basant Chaudhary	
2011	Only Love	"Sayaun Kaada"	Nhyoo Bajracharya	Basant Chaudhary	
2013	Love Forever	"Timi Aayau"	Nhyoo Bajracharya	Basant Chaudhary	
2013	Love Forever	"Timi Bahek Mero Bhannu"	Nhyoo Bajracharya	Basant Chaudhary	

== Odia songs ==
Year	Film	Song	Composer(s)	Lyricist(s)	Co-artist(s)
2013	Sandehi Priyatama	"Mate Faguna"	Sudhanshu Shekhar Mallick	Sachi Mohanty	Siba Narayan Patanaik

== Tulu songs ==
Year	Film	Song	Composer(s)	Lyricist(s)	Co-artist(s)
2016	Pilibail Yamunakka	"Cheepeda Naal Pada"	Kishore Kumar Shetty	Mayur R. Shetty	Kunal Ganjawala

== See also ==
- Filmography of Shreya Ghoshal
- List of awards and nominations received by Shreya Ghoshal
