= Amit Mishra (singer) =

Indian singer

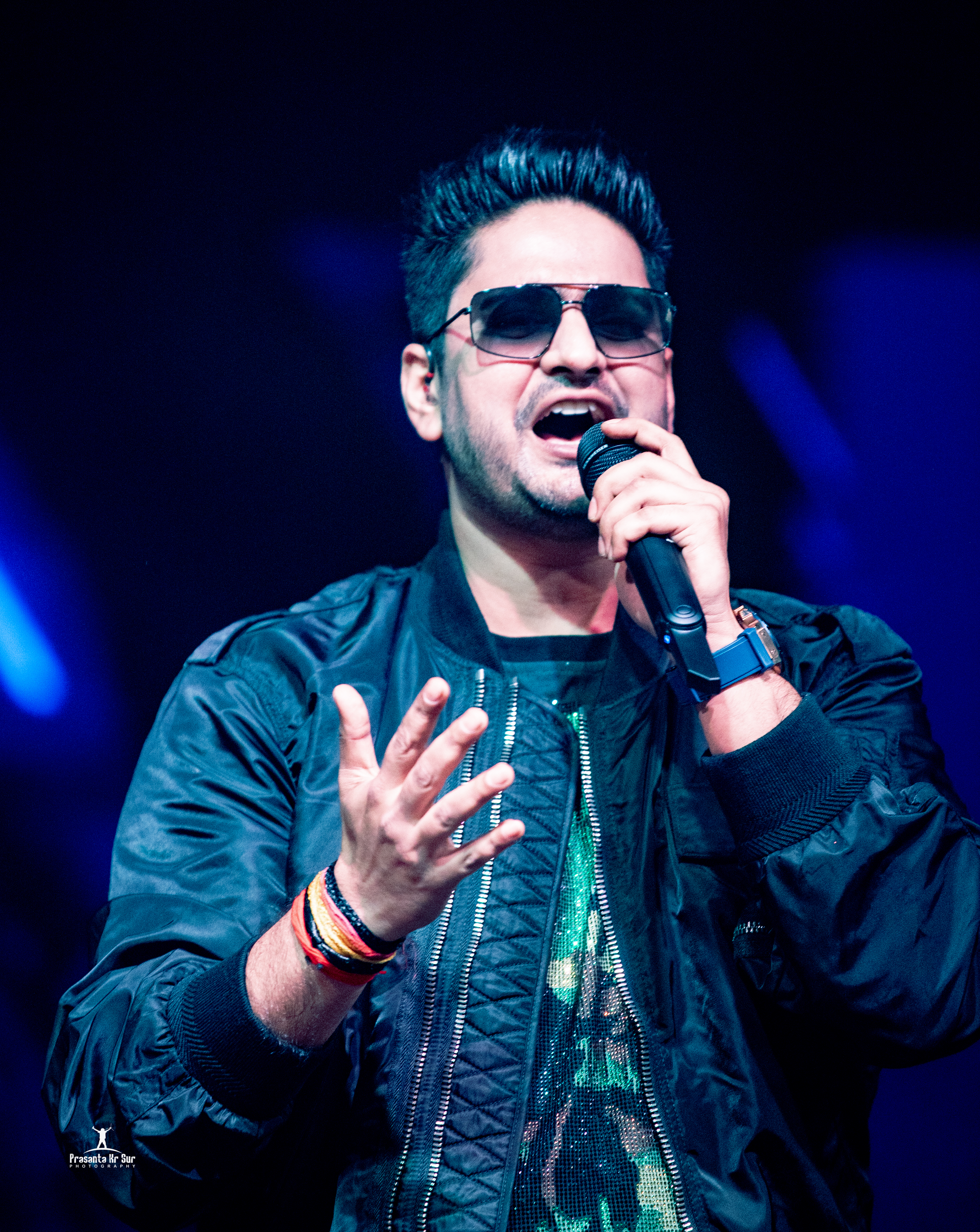

Background information
- Born: Amit Prakash Mishra; 15 February 1989 (age 37); Lucknow, Uttar Pradesh, India
- Occupation: Playback singer
- Instruments: Vocals
- Labels: Sony Music; T-Series; Tips Music; Zee Music

Amit Mishra is an Indian singer, songwriter, voice actor and live performer. He became well known after the release of the song "Bulleya" sung by him for the film Ae Dil Hai Mushkil. For his rendition of the song, he won a Filmfare Award for new music talent, Screen Award for Best Male Playback and IIFA Award for Best Male Playback. He got nominated for the same song in different award shows. He has also sung in some Telugu, Bengali and Marathi films.

== Early life ==
Amit Mishra's father Devendra Prasad Mishra is a businessman and mother Geeta Mishra is a homemaker. Amit graduated in B.Com from Lucknow University and also learned music from Bhatkhande Music Institute located at Lucknow. Amit was also part of a band called TRISHNA in Lucknow. Along with his band, Amit got a chance to perform in Idea Rocks India in 2009 which was aired on Colors TV, where Amit was the lead vocalist of the band. They were among the top 4 bands in that season.

== Career ==
Amit Mishra is a trained musician and a classical vocalist. He became recognized as a solo artist after lending his vocals to the album Eternal Love by Parthiv Shah. Amit was also part of the MTV Unplugged Season 6.

Mishra's most popular songs include "Sau Tarah Ke" from Dishoom, "Manma Emotion Jaage" from Dilwale, "Bulleya" from Ae Dil Hai Mushkil, and "Seedha Saadha" from Commando 2. He recorded a song for the film Tubelight called "Radio" along with Kamaal Khan.

As well as singing he plays a number of musical instruments. He can compose songs and has also worked as an arranger from soft instrumental to remixes. Mishra has worked nationwide and lent his voice to movies, television advertisements and daily soap titles.

Amit recorded "Rabba Ve", the track for daily soap opera airing on Star Plus, Iss Pyaar Ko Kya Naam Doon 3.

== Discography ==
=== Hindi ===
Year	Film	Song(s)	Composer(s)	Writer(s)	Co-artist(s)
2011	Hum Do Anjaane	Soniye (Band Version); Come On Come On	Prashant Singh		Shruthi Rane
2012	1920: The Evil Returns	Majboor Tu Bhi Kahin	Chirantan Bhatt	Shakeel Azmi	
2013	Sambhaji 1689	Parakram	Avinash-Vishwajeet, Guru Sharma and Aarv		Sam and Priya Raina
2014	Karle Pyaar Karle	O Darling	Prashant Singh	Shakeel Azmi	Shashaa Tirupati
2014	Amit Sahni Ki List	What the "FARK"	Palash Muchhal	Ajay Bhuyan, Tina Nagpaul	Rahul Vaidya, Aditi Singh Sharma
2014	LUV... Phir Kabhi	Mahi Tu Dil Rahi	Bubli Haque	Tanveer Ghazi	
2014	Aahinsa The Untold Story	Ali Maula	Prashant Singh	Yusuf Ali Khan	
2015	Luckhnowi Ishq	Bomb Kudi	Raaj Aashoo		Labh Janjua, Palak Muchhal, Pratibha Baghel
2015	Uvaa	Natani	Rupesh Verma	Bhupendra Singh	Sujata Mazumdar, Shiv Singh
2015	Time Out	Bheja Khali; Bolenge	Sandesh Shandilya	Deepak Ramola	Piyush Kapoor
2015	Dilwale	Manma Emotion Jaage	Pritam	Amitabh Bhattacharya	Anushka Manchanda, Antara Mitra
2016	Dishoom	Sau Tarah Ke	Pritam	Kumaar, Ashish Pandit	Jonita Gandhi
2016	Days of Tafree	Jeeley Yeh Lamhe	Bobby-Imran	Kunwar Juneja	Anupam Amod
2016	Ae Dil Hai Mushkil	Bulleya	Pritam	Amitabh Bhattacharya	Shilpa Rao
2017	Commando 2	Seedha Saadha	°Mannan Shaah	Kumaar	
2017	Meri Do Dulhan	Sapna Bani Hai Zindagi	SVH	Omer	
2017	Sargoshiyan	Lamha Lamha	Aslam Surty	Nawab Arzoo	
2017	Tubelight	Radio	Pritam	Amitabh Bhattacharya	Kamaal Khan
2017	Jagga Jasoos	"Galti Se Mistake"	Pritam	Amitabh Bhattacharya	Arijit Singh
2017	Jagga Jasoos	"Khana Khaake"	Pritam	Amitabh Bhattacharya	Various Artists
2017	Munna Michael	"Ding Dang"	Javed-Mohsin	Danish Sabri, Sabbir Khan	Antara Mitra
2017	Lucknow Central	"Meer-E-Kaarwan"	Rochak Kohli	Adheesh Verma	Neeti Mohan
2017	Judwaa 2	"Suno Ganpati Bappa Morya"	Sajid–Wajid	Danish Sabri	
2017	Aksar 2	"Tanhaiyaan"	Mithoon	Sayeed Quadri	
2017	Golmaal Again	"Itna Sannata Kyun Hai"	DJ Chetas – Lijo George	Kumaar	Aditi Singh Sharma
2018	Aiyaary	"Shuru Kar"	Rochak Kohli	Manoj Muntashir	Rochak Kohli, Neha Bhasin
2018	Race 3	"Allah Duhai Hai"	JAM8	Shabbir Ahmed	Jonita Gandhi, Sreeram
2018	Bhaiaji Superhit	"Naam Hai Bhaiaji"	Sanjeev-Darshan, Neerraj Pathak	Sanjeev Chaturvedi, Neerraj Pathak	Raftaar
2018	Rajma Chawal	"Goliyaan"	Hitesh Sonik	Irshad Kamil	
2018	Rajma Chawal	"Yaariyan"	Hitesh Sonik	Irshad Kamil	Arijit Singh
2018	Rajma Chawal	"Beemani"	Hitesh Sonik	Irshad Kamil	
2018	Rajma Chawal	"Pass Aao"	Hitesh Sonik	Irshad Kamil	
2019	Blank	"Warning Nahi Dunga"	Raghav Sachar	Kumaar	
2019	Chhichhore	Fikar Not	Pritam	Amitabh Bhattacharya	Nakash Aziz, Dev Negi, Amitabh Bhattacharya, Antara Mitra, Sreerama Chandra
2020	Jawaani Jaaneman	Ole Ole 2.0	Tanishk Bagchi	Shabbir Ahmed	
2020	Bhangra Paa Le	Sacchiyaan	JAM8	Siddhant Kaushal	Harshdeep Kaur
2020	Bhangra Paa Le	Ajj Mera Yaar	JAM8	Shloke Lal	
2021	Potluck	Its All Good	Sukhamrit-Sachin	Sukhamrit Soin	Kamakshi Rai & Sukhamrit Soin
2021	Thalaivii	Aa Thalaivii	G.V. Prakash	Irshad Kamil	
2021	Bhavai	Siyapati Ramchandra	Shabbir Ahmed		Shambhavi Raj
2021	Velle	"Uddne Do"	JAM8	Siddharth-Garima, Bipin Das	
2021	83	"Sakht Jaan"	Pritam	Jaideep Sahni	
2022	Major	Jana Gana Mana	Sricharan Pakala	Yash Eshwari	Sricharan Pakala
2022	Ardh	Dum Ali	Palaash Muchhal	Bulleh Shah, Palaash Muchhal	Divya Kumar
2022	Thai Massage	Kyon	Joi Barua	Irshad Kamil	Jonita Gandhi
2022	Love in Ukraine	Kaese Ek Pal	Nitin Kumar Gupta	Shadab Akhtar	Debanjali B Joshi
2022	Love in Ukraine	Juda Juda	Nitin Kumar Gupta	Shadab Akhtar	Debanjali B Joshi
2022	Unpaused	Naya Safar	Sachin-Jigar	Kausar Munir	
2023	Bhola	Dil Hai Bhola	Ravi Basrur	Irshad Kamil	
2023	Khichdi 2	Naach Naach	Chirantan Bhatt	Manoj Yadav	
2024	Woh Bhi Din The	"Woh Bhi Din The (Title Track)"	Joi Barua	Irshad Kamil	Joi Barua
2024	Chandu Champion	Tu Hai Champion	Pritam	IP Singh	Arijit Singh
2024	Sector 36	"Mann Kaafira"	Gourav Das Gupta	Farhan Memon	
2024	Uberman	"Rahi safar ke"	Sankalp Srivastava	Alok Sharma	
2025	Sikandar	"Sikandar Naache"	Pritam, JAM8	Sameer Anjaan, Siddhaant Miishhraa	Akasa Singh, Siddhaant Miishhraa
2025	Andaaz 2	"Hum Jaise Jee Rahe Hain"	Nadeem Saifi	Sameer Anjaan	
2025	Sunny Sanskari Ki Tulsi Kumari	"Ishq Manzoor"	A.P.S	Jairaj	Nakash Aziz, Shreya Ghoshal, Antara Mitra

=== Bengali ===
Year	Film	Song	Composer(s)	Writer(s)	Co-artist(s)
2016	Abhimaan	Abhimaan (Title Track)	Suddho Roy	Priyo	
2017	Boss 2: Back to Rule	Boss 2 (Title Track)	Jeet Gannguli	Priyo	
2017	Relation	Mon Awara	Pijush Chakraborty	Anindita Chakraborty, Goutam Susmit	
2018	Fidaa	Thiki Thiki	Arindam Chatterjee	Prasen	
2018	Hoichoi Unlimited	Pala Pala	Savvy	Riddhi Barua	
2024	Dear Diary	Polatok	Indraadip Das Gupta	Pralay Sarkar	Debayan Banerjee
2024	Mirza	Elo Mirza	Aneek Dhar	Pranjal Das	Aneek Dhar

=== Telugu ===
Year	Film	Song	Composer(s)	Writer(s)	Co-artist(s)
2016	Dhruva	Dhruva Dhruva	Hiphop Tamizha	Chandrabose	Solo
2020	Street Dancer 3d	O Deva Deva	Sachin-Jigar	Ramajogayya Shastry	Bohemia, Sachin-Jigar
2021	83 Telugu	Aagipothe Thappu	Pritam	Jaideep Sahni, Sriraag Vadlakonda	

=== Tamil ===
Year	Film	Song	Composer(s)	Writer(s)	Co-artist(s)
2020	Street Dancer 3D	Maraven Yen Adayaalam	Sachin-Jigar	Veeramani Kannan	Bohemia, Sachin-Jigar
2021	83 Tamil	Thalarndhidathe	Pritam	Jaideep Sahni, RP Bala	

=== Marathi ===
Year	Film	Song	Composer(s)	Writer(s)	Co-artist(s)
2015	Shortcut	Shortcut (Title Track)	Chand Sadhwani	Vinay Narayane	Solo
2022	Gaar Gaar Vaar	Gaar Gaar Vaar	Sameer – Sonu	Satish koyande	Solo

=== Album songs ===
Year	Album	Song	Composer(s)	Writer(s)	Co-Singer(s)	Director(s)
2013	Nostalgia	Jabse Dekha Hai Tujhe	Vishwajeet	Anil Malik	Vinod Rathod	
2014	Eternal Love	Lonely	Parthiv Shah	Maan Taneja – Sahiljeet Singh, Amit Mishra	Jeyabargavi	
2014	Khwahishein	Galat Baat Hai	Kaushal Mahavir & Mukesh Singh	Mukesh Singh		
2016	Hututu Tu	Hututu Tu	Shivam Suratwala	Lalabhai Suratwala & Shivam Suratwala	Shivam Suratwala	
2017	Zindagi Yeh Zindagi	Zindagi Tujhse Kya Karen Shikvey	Raaj Aashoo	Murli Agarwal		
2019	Aaya Mausam Pyara	Aaya Mausam Pyara	Prashant Singh	Sandeep Singh Bidlaan		
2020	Tere Bina	Tere Bina	Palaash Muchhal	Palak Muchhal		
2020	Tere Siva	Tere Siva	Sanjeev – Ajay	Sanjeev Chaturvedi		
2020	Dooriyaan Na payin	Doriyaan Na payin	A. Sonu & Pritom	Sabhir/rk		
2020	Un Lamhon Mein	Un Lamhon Mein	Sunil Devbanshi	Laado Suwalka	Soumee Sailsh	
2020	Dil Se Mere Meri Baat Hui	Dil Se Mere Meri Baat Hui	Raghav Sachar	Laado Suwalka		
2020	Daastan	Daastan	Apoorv Singh	Apoorv Singh		
2020	Kaise Bhoolun Mein	Kaise Bhoolun Mein	Raaj Aashoo	Murali Agarwal		
2020	Ab Kya Jaan Legi Meri	Ab Kya Jaan Legi Meri	Palaash Muchhal	Bipin Das, Alok Jha & Kunaal Verma	Palaash Muchhal	
2021	Fakira	Fakira	B Praak	Shekhar Astitwa		
2021	Taqleefein	Taqleefein	Abhishek – Amol	Abhishek Talented	Ritika Raj Singh	
2021	Aashiq Tera	Aashiq Tera	Kaushik – Guddu	Kaushal Kishor		
2021	Bechainiyan	Bechainiyan	Ayaan Ali Abbas	Ayaan Ali Abbas	Reena Mehta	
2021	Tera Deewana	Tera Deewana	Anand Swaroop Tripathi	Amit Mishra		
2021	O Maa	O Maa	Anand Swaroop Tripathi	Abhendra Kumar Upadhyay		
2021	Birthday Pawri	Birthday Pawri	Meet Bros	Kunwar Juneja	Meet Bros, Aditi Singh Sharma, Mellow D	
2021	Cutie Pie	Cutie Pie	Bhanu Pandit	Bhanu Pandit		
2021	Jiss Waqt Tera Chehra	Jiss Waqt Tera Chehra	Sagar	Moied Elhaam	Tarannum Malik	
2021	Aadha Hi Rah Jaunga	Aadha Hi Rah Jaunga	Mayank Shukla	Abhendra Kumar Upadhyay		
2021	Chaturnaar	Chaturnaar	Aslam Keyi	Kumaar		Jassi Singh
2022	Tera Rahoon	Tera Rahoon	Manish S Sharmaa	Pankaj Dixit		Ankur Chaudhary
2022	Arsaa	Arsaa	Pranav Singh	DRG		
2023	Latka	Latka	The real Emotion	Ubaid taj	Shilpa Surroch	The Real Emotion
2024	Jogi	Jogi	Raaj Aashoo	Ameer Khusro	Salman Ali	
2024	Meri Manzil	Meri Manzil	Maanaav Podaar	Vimal Kashyap		
2024	Tishnagi teri	Tishnagi teri	Piyush Arya	Arshad Maula		

=== Devotional songs ===
Year	Song	Composer (s)	Writer (s)	Label	Co-Singer(s)
2018	Ganpati Deva	Sonal Pradhaan	Sonal Pradhaan	Zee Music Company	–
2020	Jai Ganesh Jai Ganesh Deva	Keshav Kumar	Traditional	Voila Digi Classic	---
2020	Shree Hanuman Chalisa	Traditional	Traditional	Voila Digi Classic	---
2020	Om Namah Shivay	Keshav Kumar	Traditional	Voila Digi Classic	---
2020	Krishna Murari	G. Manoj	G. Manoj	SKS Music	---
2020	Gayatri Mantra	Traditional	Traditional	Voila Digi Classic	---
2020	Saraswati Vandana	Mayank Shukla	Mayank Shukla	Prime Music paradise	---
2020	Rudrashtakam	Anand Swaroop Tripathi	Traditional	Prime Music Paradise	---
2020	Jai Shree Krishna Mantra	Traditional	Traditional	Voila Gigi Classic	---
2020	Ghar Aaye Prabhu Ram	Bawa Gulzar	Pradeep Sahil	Tips Bhakti Prem	---
2021	Shyam Teri Lagan Laagi Re	Harry Anand	Harry Anand – Divyesh Mungra	JK Yog Music	---
2021	Om Sai Namo Namah	Traditional	Traditional	Voila Digi Classic	---
2021	Shree Hanuman Chalisa	Kedar Pandit	Traditional	Tips Bhakti Prem	---
2022	O Ganaraya	Lijo George - DJ Chetas	Kumaar	VYRL Originals	Siddharth Mahadevan Lijo George
2022	Morya Morya	Sugat Dhanvijay	Tripurari	Saregama Bhakti	---
2023	Hanuman Chalisa	Maanaav Podaar	Traditional	Leo Global Music Bhakti	---
2023	Japta Ja Narayan Narayan	Siddhant Madhav Mishra	Traditional	Tips Bhakti Prem	---
2023	Om Namah Shivay	Keshav Kumar	Traditional	Voila Digi Bhakti	---
2023	Govind Bolo Hari Gopal Bolo	Keshav Kumar	Traditional	Voila Digi Bhakti	---
2023	Achyutam Keshavam	Keshav Kumar	Traditional	Voila Digi Bhakti	---
2023	Jai Shree Krishna	Keshav Kumar	Traditional	Voila Digi Bhakti	---
2023	gayatri Mantra	Keshav Kumar	Traditional	Voila Digi Bhakti	---
2024	Shreeman Narayan	Kedar Pandit	Traditional	Tips Bhakti Prem	Deedar kaur

== As a lyricist ==
Year	Film	Song(s)	Composer(s)	Notes
2014	Eternal Love	"Lonely"	Parthiv Shah	Lyrics along with Maan Taneja, Sahiljeet Singh
2021	Album – Tera Deewana	Tera Deewana	Anand Swaroop Tripathi	Lyricist – Amit Mishra

== Awards and nominations ==
=== As singer ===
Year	Film	Nominated Song	Result
2016	Dilwale	"Manma Emotion Jaage"	Nominated--8th Mirchi Music Awards for Upcoming Male Vocalist of The Year
2017	Ae Dil Hai Mushkil	"Bulleya"	Won--Filmfare RD Burman Award for New Music Talent; Won--Screen Award for Best Male Playback; Nominated--Filmfare Award for Best Male Playback Singer; Nominated--Mirchi Music Awards for Male Vocalist of the Year; Nominated--Zee Cine Awards 2017 for Best Playback Singer – Male; Won--IIFA Award for Best Male Playback Singer; Won--BIG Zee Most Entertaining Singer (Male) Award at 2017 Big Zee Entertainment Awards
