= Manohar Singh of Bedla =

Indian nobleman, 16th Rao of Bedla (1904–1984)

Manohar Singh
- Rao of Bedla

16th Rao of Bedla
- Reign: 1936 – 1984
- Predecessor: Rao Nahar Singh
- Successor: Rao Madhav Singh
- Born: January 1904
- Died: 1984
- Issue: Raghunath Singh; Shankar Kumari; Himmat Kumari; Anand Kumari; Madhav Singh; Janak Singh; Vijai Singh
- House: Chauhan (Bedla)
- Father: Thakur Govind Singh of Bedla
- Religion: Hinduism
- Occupation: Soldier, administrator

Major-General Rao Manohar Singh, MBE (January 1904 – 1984) was an Indian nobleman, soldier and administrator who was the 16th Rao of Bedla, one of the sixteen first-class estates (Solah Umrao) of the princely state of Mewar in Rajputana. A Chauhan Rajput of the Mainpuri line that had served Mewar since the Battle of Khanwa in 1527, he succeeded to the estate in 1936 and held the offices of Aide-de-camp to the Maharana, Home Minister of the Mewar State Council and Prime Minister of Udaipur.

After the integration of the Rajput states into Rajasthan he became the principal litigant against the state's early jagir-resumption ordinances. His case, The State of Rajasthan v. Rao Manohar Singhji (1954), was decided by a five-judge bench of the Supreme Court of India and is a standard authority on the right to equality under Article 14 of the Constitution.

== Early life and family ==
Manohar Singh was born in January 1904 into the Chauhan house of Bedla. His father, Thakur Govind Singh (born 2 September 1878), was a younger son of Rao Bahadur Takhat Singh, 13th Rao of Bedla (reigned 1880–1892), by his second wife, a Chundawat Sisodia of Athana in Gwalior State. Takhat Singh had been a member of the Mahendraj Sabha, the Mewar council of nobles, and was created Rao Bahadur on 1 January 1887.

The senior line passed from Takhat Singh to his eldest son Rao Bahadur Karan Singh (1865–1900), 14th Rao, and then to Karan Singh's son Rao Nahar Singh (born 1895), 15th Rao from 1900. Nahar Singh, educated at Mayo College, Ajmer, left only a daughter, Chandra Kumari, who married Thakur Guman Singh of Gudha in Jaipur State in 1939. Manohar Singh, as the senior male of the next branch, was recognised as Rao of Bedla in 1936.

Like his cousin, Manohar Singh was educated at Mayo College, Ajmer, the Chiefs' College for the Rajputana princes and nobility.

== The Bedla estate ==
Bedla is a village in Badgaon tehsil of Udaipur district, on the Udaipur–Nathdwara road about 8 km from the city centre; its population was 5,766 at the 2011 census. The estate comprised 111 villages with a population of 12,866 in 1901 and an assessed revenue of ₹64,000.

The Raos of Bedla are Chauhan Rajputs descended from Prithviraj Chauhan of Delhi through the Mainpuri branch of the clan in present-day Uttar Pradesh. Family tradition holds that Rao Chandrabhan Singh came to Mewar at the invitation of Rana Sanga with some 4,000 horsemen, fought at Dholpur, Khatoli, Bayana, Gagron and Idar, and was killed at the Battle of Khanwa in 1527 charging Babur's artillery. The Maharana rewarded the family with three first-class estates: Bedla, Kotharia and Parsoli. James Tod, writing in the 1820s, records "the feudatory chiefs of Bedla and Kotharia, descended from Prithiraj of Delhi" among the defenders of Chittor. Chandrabhan's son Rao Sangram Singh died in the second sack of Chittor in 1535.

Bedla ranked among the Solah Umrao, the sixteen premier nobles of Mewar, and its chiefs served for generations as Pradhan (prime minister) to the Maharanas, who addressed the Rao of Bedla as Bhanjya (sister's son). A Mewar saying, आधा आसन बेदला, आधा आसन दरबार ("half the seat is Bedla's, half the Darbar's"), records the estate's standing. Rao Ram Chandra I's daughter Dev Kunwar married Amar Singh II and was the mother of Sangram Singh II. A painting of Rao Ram Chandra II on a swing, c. 1740s, is in the Smithsonian's National Museum of Asian Art.

In the nineteenth century Rao Bahadur Bakht Singh II (1816–1880), created CIE in 1878, escorted British refugees from Neemuch to safety at Jag Mandir during the uprising of 1857. A watercolour of him with his son Takhat Singh by William Carpenter (1857) and a c. 1838 painting of him in conference with British officials survive in collections in Delhi and Singapore.

== Service to Mewar State ==
Manohar Singh served Maharana Bhupal Singh (reigned 1930–1955) in both military and civil capacities. He was Aide-de-Camp to the Maharana and held the rank of Major-General, in the pattern of the honorary and State Forces ranks that Mewar's senior nobles customarily bore. In the civil administration he was Home Minister of the Mewar State Council and subsequently Prime Minister of Udaipur, continuing the family's traditional role as Pradhan.

The family's town residence, Bedla House on Chetak Marg in the Chamanpura quarter of Udaipur, is described in later accounts as "the former prime minister of Udaipur's residence" and was the house in which the Bedlas, as premier jagirdars, traditionally entertained dignitaries visiting the Maharana; the family is recorded as having cooked for Indira Gandhi and Queen Elizabeth II.

Mewar acceded to the Dominion of India in 1947 and merged into the United State of Rajasthan on 18 April 1948. The ordinances of 1948–1949 that followed, which transferred the collection of jagir revenues to the new state, ended the administrative careers of the Mewar nobility and led directly to the litigation for which Manohar Singh is chiefly remembered.

== Jagir resumption litigation ==
=== Rajasthan High Court, 1951 ===
In 1951 Manohar Singh, styled "Rao Sahib Manohar Singhji, Jagirdar of Bedla", petitioned the Rajasthan High Court for a writ against the State of Rajasthan. He claimed as owner of the jagir of Bedla "situate in the former State of Mewar" and challenged Ordinance XXVII of 1948 and Ordinances X and XV of 1949, by section 8-A of which the state had taken over the collection of rents from jagir lands in the former Mewar territory. On 11 December 1951 the court prohibited the state from collecting the revenues directly and awarded him costs.

=== Supreme Court of India, 1954 ===
The state appealed. The State of Rajasthan v. Rao Manohar Singhji, Civil Appeal No. 143 of 1952, was heard by a Constitution Bench of Chief Justice M. C. Mahajan and Justices B. K. Mukherjea, S. R. Das, Vivian Bose and Ghulam Hasan, with Attorney-General M. C. Setalvad appearing for the state and N. C. Chatterjee and U. M. Trivedi for the Rao.

On 15 March 1954 the court, in a judgment by Ghulam Hasan J., dismissed the appeal. It held that section 8-A was void under Article 14 of the Constitution because it applied only to jagirdars of the former Mewar area, which had integrated into Rajasthan first, and not to those of Jaipur, Jodhpur, Bikaner, Jaisalmer or the Matsya Union. The discrimination, the court found, "is based on no classification at all and is manifestly unreasonable and arbitrary."

=== Suit for accounts, 1960 ===
Manohar Singh then sued for an account of the revenues the state had collected from his jagir between 26 January 1950 and 22 October 1951. After notice under section 80 of the Code of Civil Procedure on 12 May 1954 the suit was filed on 4 January 1955. On 17 August 1960 the Rajasthan High Court (I. N. Modi J.) held that the state had acted as a de facto agent and was liable to render accounts, and dismissed the state's appeal with costs.

The Rajasthan Land Reforms and Resumption of Jagirs Act, 1952, ultimately resumed the Bedla jagir, as it did all jagirs in the state.

== Honours and titles ==
- Rao of Bedla, recognised 1936
- Member of the Order of the British Empire (MBE)
- Major-General, Mewar State Forces
- Aide-de-Camp to His Highness the Maharana of Udaipur

Styled in full: Major-General Rao Saheb Manohar Singhji, MBE, Rao of Bedla.

== Personal life and descendants ==
The published genealogy does not record the name of Manohar Singh's wife. He had four sons and three daughters:

Child	Married
Kunwar Raghunath Singh	Kanwarani Samand Kanwar
Baisa Shankar Kumari	Major Thakur Durga Das of Doongri
Baisa Himmat Kumari	Rawal Pushpendra Singh of Salumbar, Udaipur
Baisa Anand Kumari	Kunwar Ajatshatru Singh of Bissau, Jaipur
Rao Madhav Singh (1946–2008)	1970, Rani Durga Kiran Kumari of Neri, U.P. (d. 2003)
Thakur Janak Singh (d. 1986)	Thakurani Dharmendra Kumari
Thakur Vijai Singh	Kanwarani Sugan Kumari

His grandson Rao Himmat Singh Bedla (born 1981), educated at Mayo College and the University of Rajasthan, is the 18th and present Rao of Bedla, recognised as a first-class noble of Udaipur. He married in 2009 Manisha, daughter of Captain Kuldeep Singh Solanki of Balana in Marwar, and plays polo for the Jindal Bedla team in the Jaipur season.

Bedla House in Udaipur remains with the family and now houses a restaurant, Royal Repast.

== Death and succession ==
Manohar Singh died in 1984. His eldest son Raghunath Singh having predeceased him without issue, he was succeeded as 17th Rao by his son Madhav Singh (1946–2008), an MBA of Ohio University (1968), who was in turn succeeded by his son Himmat Singh.
