= Kasupur Dulhar =

Kasu Pur (Dulhar) کیسوپور ڈلہر
- Location within Pakistan
- Coordinates: 32.26°N 72.50°E
- Country: Pakistan
- Province: Punjab
- District: Sargodha District
- Elevation: 190 m (620 ft)
- Time zone: UTC+5 (PST)

Kasu Pur Dulhar (کیسوپور ڈلہر) is a village in Sargodha District in the Punjab Province of Pakistan. It is at 32°26'11.7"N 72°50'08.2"E with an altitude of 190 metres (620 ft).

Its neighboring villages are Kohlian to the west, Turtipur to the south, and Sheikh Da lok to the east.

The main castes in villages are Gondal (Dulhar), Sial, Chohan, and Noul. People of the village are engaged in agriculture.

== Masjid ==
There is one main masjid in village, Jamiya Masjid Kasupur Dulhar/.

== School ==
There is one Government English Medium Primary School.

== Common places (daras) ==
- Dara Ch Amir Gondal
- Dara Ch Zafar Iqbal Gondal
- Dara Afzal Sial
- Dara Haji Mazhar Sial
