= Vishwajeet =

- Pronunciation: Sanskrit: विश्वजीत
- Gender: Masculine
- Language: Sanskrit, Bengali

Origin
- Origin: Indo-Aryan
- Meaning: "conqueror of the universe" "knowledgeable"
- Region of origin: North India; Bengal

Other names
- Alternative spelling: Vishwajit, Biswajit
- Related names: Vishwanathan, Prithviraj

Vishwajeet (Sanskrit: विश्वजीत; Bengali: বিশ্বজিৎ) is an Indian masculine name of Indo-Aryan origin. In the Sanskrit language, vishwa means 'universe' and jeet means 'victory'. Thereby, Vishwajeet can be loosely translated as 'conqueror of the universe'. It is also the name of an ancient yajna (sacrifice) mentioned in the Vedas, performed by brahmins (the highest of the four Hindu castes) upon the victory of a monarch in war.

== Notable people ==
=== Bengalis ===
- Biswajit Chatterjee, prominent Bengali actor
- Biswajit Bhattacharya, manager of East Bengal F.C.
- Kumar Bishwajit (Dey), Bengali singer and composer
- Bishwajit Bhattacharjee, researcher and professor at Indian Institute of Technology Delhi
- Biswajit Biswas, footballer at United S.C.
- Pandit Biswajit Roy Chowdhury, Hindustani classical musician
- Biswajit Chattopadhyay, Bengali actor
- Biswajit Saha, footballer
- Bishwajit Bhattacharyya, former Solicitor General of India
- Biswajit Paul, cricketer

=== Others ===
- Vishwajeet Pradhan, Bollywood actor
- Vishvjit Singh, Indian National Congress politician
- Vishwajit Pratapsingh Rane, MLA from Goa
- Vishvajit Malla, King of the Malla dynasty
- Biswajit Daimary, politician, member of the Rajya Sabha
- Vishwajeet, mythological ancestor of the Chola dynasty mentioned in the Thiruvalangadu copperplate

== See also ==
- Indian name
- Given name
