= Prithviraj Chauhan (disambiguation) =

Prithviraj Chouhan may refer to

- Prithviraj Chauhan, the ruler of the kingdom of Ajmer and Delhi in northern India during the latter half of the 12th century
  - Prithviraj Chauhan's Fort or Asigarh Fort, Hayana, India
  - Prithviraj Raso, medieval Indian epic about the king by Chand Bardai
  - Prithviraja Vijaya, Indian poem in Sanskrit about the king
  - Prithviraj Chauhan, Nepali-language epic about the Indian king by Laxmi Prasad Devkota
  - Prithviraj Chouhan (1924), 1924 Indian silent film
  - Prithviraj Sanyogita (1929), 1929 Indian silent film by Narayanrao D. Sarpotdar
  - Prithviraj (1931), 1931 Indian silent film by R. N. Vaidya
  - Prithviraj Sanyogita (1933) 1933 Indian Hindi-language film
  - Prithivirajan (1942), 1942 Indian Tamil-language film by B. Sampathkumar
  - Prithviraj Samyogita (1946), 1946 Indian Hindi-language film by Najam Naqvi
  - Samrat Prithviraj Chauhan (1959), 1959 Indian Hindi-language film by Harsukh Jagneshwar Bhatt
  - Samrat Prithviraj, 2022 Indian Hindi-language film by Chandraprakash Dwivedi
  - Dharti Ka Veer Yodha Prithviraj Chauhan, Indian TV show aired on Star Plus in 2006-09
  - Veer Yodha Prithviraj Chauhan (2008), 2008 Indian animated film
  - Prithviraj Chauhan, Indian Amar Chitra Katha comic title
- Prithviraj Chavan, an Indian politician and former Chief Minister of Maharashtra State, India

== See also ==
- Prithviraj (disambiguation)
- Chahamanas (disambiguation), alternate rendition of Chauhan
- Pithora (disambiguation), alternate rendition of Prithviraj
