= Chauhan =

Chauhan may refer to:

- Chauhan (surname), an Indian surname
- Chaguanas, a town in Trinidad and Tobago called Chauhan by the early Indian indentured immigrant

== Clans ==
- Chauhan dynasty, a medieval Indian dynasty
- Chauhan (Banjara clan), clan of Banjara caste
- Chauhan (Koli clan), clan of Koli caste
- Chauhan (Lonia clan), Lonia, clan of Noniya caste
- Chauhan (Mer clan), clan of Mer community

== See also ==
- Chauhanpur, a village in Uttar Pradesh, India
- Chahamanas (disambiguation)
- Chavan, a Maratha clan in India
