= Sagamai =

Village in Uttar Pradesh, India

- Village
- Location in Uttar Pradesh, India
- Coordinates: 27.16495°N 79.10928°E
- Country: India
- State: Uttar Pradesh
- District: Mainpuri
- Tehsil: Bhongaon

Area
  - Total: 3.302 km^{2} (1.275 sq mi)

Population (2011)
  - Total: 3,369
  - Density: 1,020/km^{2} (2,643/sq mi)
- Time zone: UTC+5:30 (IST)
- PIN: 205120

Sagamai (Sagāmaī) is a village in Bhongaon tehsil of Mainpuri district, Uttar Pradesh. It is the headquarters of the community development block of Jagir, which comprises Sagamai plus 56 other villages. As of 2011, Sagamai had a population of 3,369, in 587 households.

== Demographics ==
As of 2011, Sagamai had a population of 3,369, in 587 households. This population was 53.2% male (1,793) and 46.8% female (1,576). The 0-6 age group numbered 519 (278 male and 241 female), or 15.4% of the total population. 718 residents were members of Scheduled Castes, or 21.3% of the total.

The 1961 census recorded Sagamai as comprising 3 hamlets, with a total population of 1,592 people (846 male and 746 female), in 308 households and 233 physical houses. The area of the village was given as 809 acres.

== Infrastructure ==
As of 2011, Sagamai had 3 primary schools and 1 maternity and child welfare centre. Drinking water was provided by well, hand pump, and tube well; there were no public toilets. The village had a post office but no public library; there was at least some access to electricity for all purposes. Streets were made of both kachcha and pakka materials.

== Jagir CD block ==
Sagamai is the headquarters of the Jagir community development block, in the tehsil of Bhongaon. The block has a total population of 116,252. The following 57 villages are counted as part of Jagir CD block:

1. Adhar
2. Ajeetganj
3. Allau
4. Aung
5. Baghirua
6. Basawanpur
7. Bhanwat
8. Birampur
9. Birpur Kalan
10. Birpur Khurd
11. Byonti Kalan
12. Chandarpur
13. Chauhanpur
14. Dalpura
15. Dayarampur
16. Dwarikapur
17. Faridpur
18. Gadaipura
19. Goshalpur Gahiar
20. Hatpau
21. Kachhapura
22. Kailanpur
23. Kasadha
24. Korari
25. Kusma Khera
26. Lalpur Adhar
27. Lalpur Meerapur
28. Lekharajpur
29. Madhupuri
30. Maidepur
31. Malikpur
32. Manchhana
33. Mangalpur
34. Maujepur
35. Meerapur Gujarati
36. Merapur Khizarpur
37. Myora Chak Abdullapur
38. Nagla Bari
39. Nagla Gahiar
40. Nagla Kanhar
41. Nagla Miti
42. Nagla Soti
43. Nakhatpur
44. Navada
45. Parigawan
46. Parwatpur
47. Pundai
48. Rajalpur
49. Rajpur Kalan
50. Rajpur Khurd
51. Ratanpur Bara
52. Ratanpur Kirkitch
53. Sagamai (block headquarters)
54. Salempur Parhina
55. Sugaon
56. Sumerpur
57. Tiksuri
