= Sisodia =

Sisodia or Sisodiya may refer to:

- Sisodia (surname), an Indian Hindu surname
- Sisodia dynasty, a Hindu dynasty
- Piplia Sisodia, a village in Madheya Pradesh, India
- Sisodiya Rani Bagh, a palace in Jaipur, Rajasthan, India
