= Lekhrajpur =

Village in Uttar Pradesh, India

- Village
- Location in Uttar Pradesh, India
- Coordinates: 27.09953°N 79.15054°E
- Country: India
- State: Uttar Pradesh
- District: Mainpuri
- Tehsil: Bhongaon

Area
  - Total: 3.176 km^{2} (1.226 sq mi)

Population (2011)
  - Total: 1,538
  - Density: 484.3/km^{2} (1,254/sq mi)
- Time zone: UTC+5:30 (IST)

Lekhrajpur (Lekhrājpur) is a village in Jagir block of Mainpuri district, Uttar Pradesh, India. As of 2011, it had a total population of 1,538, in 270 households.

== Demographics ==
As of 2011, Lekhrajpur had a population of 1,538, in 270 households. This population was 55.5% male (853) and 44.5% female (685). The 0-6 age group numbered 191 (110 male and 81 female), or 12.4% of the total population. 172 residents were members of Scheduled Castes, or 11.2% of the total.

The 1981 census recorded Lekhrajpur as having a population of 896 people, in 154 households.

The 1961 census recorded Lekhrajpur as comprising 5 hamlets, with a total population of 672 people (363 male and 309 female), in 138 households and 93 physical houses. The area of the village was given as 945 acres.

== Infrastructure ==
As of 2011, Lekhrajpur had 4 primary schools and 1 primary health centre. Drinking water was provided by well, hand pump, and tube well/borehole; there were no public toilets. The village did not have a post office or public library; there was at least some access to electricity for all purposes. Streets were made of both kachcha and pakka materials.
