= Birpur Khurd =

Village in Uttar Pradesh, India

- Village
- Location in Uttar Pradesh, India
- Coordinates: 27.19191°N 79.16558°E
- Country: India
- State: Uttar Pradesh
- District: Mainpuri
- Tehsil: Bhongaon

Area
  - Total: 1.19 km^{2} (0.46 sq mi)

Population (2011)
  - Total: 739
  - Density: 621/km^{2} (1,610/sq mi)
- Time zone: UTC+5:30 (IST)

Birpur Khurd (Bīrpur Khurd) is a village in Jagir block of Mainpuri district, Uttar Pradesh. As of 2011, it had a total population of 739, in 126 households.

== Demographics ==
As of 2011, Birpur Khurd had a population of 739, in 126 households. This population was 51.2% male (379) and 48.7% female (360). The 0-6 age group numbered 106 (52 male and 54 female), or 14.3% of the total population. No residents were members of Scheduled Castes.

The 1981 census recorded Birpur Khurd as having a population of 397 people, in 79 households.

The 1961 census recorded Birpur Khurd as comprising 1 hamlet, with a total population of 286 people (145 male and 141 female), in 63 households and 40 physical houses. The area of the village was given as 313 acres.

== Infrastructure ==
As of 2011, Birpur Khurd had 1 primary school; it did not have any healthcare facilities. Drinking water was provided by hand pump; there were no public toilets. The village had a post office but no public library; there was at least some access to electricity for all purposes. Streets were made of kachcha materials.

== See also ==
- Birpur Kalan
