= Pithora =

Pithora may refer to:

- Pithora, Chhattisgarh, a town in India
- Pithora (painting), an Indian style of painting
- Prithviraja III or Prithviraj Chauhan, an Indian king, also known as Rai Pithora
  - Qila Rai Pithora, fort in Delhi, India, named after the king
- Pithora Fort, a fort in Uttarakhand India

== See also ==
- Prithviraj (disambiguation), alternate rendition of Pithora
- Prithviraj Chauhan (disambiguation)
