= Faridpur, Mainpuri =

Village in Uttar Pradesh, India

Faridpur
- Village
- Location in Uttar Pradesh, India
- Coordinates: 27.18882°N 79.12677°E
- Country: India
- State: Uttar Pradesh
- District: Mainpuri
- Tehsil: Bhongaon

Area
  - Total: 0.686 km^{2} (0.265 sq mi)

Population (2011)
  - Total: 747
  - Density: 1,090/km^{2} (2,820/sq mi)
- Time zone: UTC+5:30 (IST)

Faridpur (Farīdpur) is a village in Jagir block of Mainpuri district, Uttar Pradesh. As of 2011, it has a total population of 747, in 120 households.

== Demographics ==
As of 2011, Faridpur had a population of 747, in 120 households. This population was 52.9% male (395) and 47.1% female (352). The 0-6 age group numbered 114 (65 male and 49 female), or 15.3% of the total population. No residents were members of Scheduled Castes.

The 1981 census recorded Faridpur as having a population of 424 people, in 80 households.

The 1961 census recorded Faridpur as comprising 1 hamlet, with a total population of 319 people (174 male and 145 female), in 68 households and 47 physical houses. The area of the village was given as 187 acres.

== Infrastructure ==
As of 2011, Faridpur had 1 primary school; it did not have any healthcare facilities. Drinking water was provided by hand pump and tube well; there were no public toilets. The village had a post office but no public library; there was at least some access to electricity for all purposes. Streets were made of both kachcha and pakka materials.
