= Nagla Soti =

Village in Uttar Pradesh, India

- Village
- Location in Uttar Pradesh, India
- Coordinates: 27.19374°N 79.07345°E
- Country: India
- State: Uttar Pradesh
- District: Mainpuri
- Tehsil: Bhongaon

Area
  - Total: 0.135 km^{2} (0.052 sq mi)

Population (2011)
  - Total: 165
  - Density: 1,220/km^{2} (3,170/sq mi)
- Time zone: UTC+5:30 (IST)

Nagla Soti (Naglā Sotī) is a village in Jagir block of Mainpuri district, Uttar Pradesh. It is completely surrounded by lands belonging to the village of Manchhana. As of 2011, it had a total population of 165, in 31 households.

== Geography ==
Nagla Soti is located about 4 km southeast of Mainpuri and is completely surrounded by lands belonging to the village of Manchhana.

== Demographics ==
As of 2011, Nagla Soti had a population of 165, in 31 households. This population was 55.8% male (92) and 44.2% female (73). The 0-6 age group numbered 35 (25 male and 10 female), or 21.2% of the total population. No residents were members of Scheduled Castes.

The 1981 census recorded Nagla Soti as having a population of 611 people, in 100 households.

The 1961 census recorded Nagla Soti as comprising 1 hamlet, with a total population of 36 people (24 male and 12 female), in 6 households and 4 physical houses. The area of the village was given as 33 acres.

== Infrastructure ==
As of 2011, Nagla Soti had 1 primary school; it did not have any healthcare facilities. Drinking water was provided by tap and hand pump; there were no public toilets. The village had a post office but no public library; there was at least some access to electricity for residential and agricultural purposes. Streets were made of both kachcha and pakka materials.
