= Nagla Bari =

Village in Uttar Pradesh, India

- Village
- Location in Uttar Pradesh, India
- Coordinates: 27.1900°N 79.17394°E
- Country: India
- State: Uttar Pradesh
- District: Mainpuri
- Tehsil: Bhongaon

Area
  - Total: 0.608 km^{2} (0.235 sq mi)

Population (2011)
  - Total: 180
  - Density: 300/km^{2} (770/sq mi)
- Time zone: UTC+5:30 (IST)

Nagla Bari ( Naglā Barī) is a village in Jagir block of Mainpuri district, Uttar Pradesh, India. As of 2011, it had a total population of 180, in 33 households.

== Demographics ==
As of 2011, Nagla Bari had a population of 180, in 33 households. This population was 56.7% male (102) and 43.3% female (78). The 0-6 age group numbered 38 (21 male and 17 female), or 21.1% of the total population. 84 residents were members of Scheduled Castes, or 46.7% of the total.

The 1981 census recorded Nagla Bari as having a population of 108 people, in 22 households.

The 1961 census recorded Nagla Bari as comprising 1 hamlets, with a total population of 88 people (52 male and 36 female), in 16 households and 11 physical houses. The area of the village was given as 148 acres.

== Infrastructure ==
As of 2011, Nagla Bari did not have any schools or healthcare facilities. Drinking water was provided by hand pump; there were no public toilets. The village had a post office but no public library; there was at least some access to electricity for commercial and agricultural purposes. Streets were made of both kachcha and pakka materials.
