= Sugaon =

Village in Uttar Pradesh, India

- Village
- Location in Uttar Pradesh, India
- Coordinates: 27.11539°N 79.14586°E
- Country: India
- State: Uttar Pradesh
- District: Mainpuri
- Tehsil: Bhongaon

Area
  - Total: 7.222 km^{2} (2.788 sq mi)

Population (2011)
  - Total: 3,319
  - Density: 459.6/km^{2} (1,190/sq mi)
- Time zone: UTC+5:30 (IST)
- PIN: 205120

Sugaon (Sugā̃v) is a village in Jagir block of Mainpuri district, Uttar Pradesh, India. As of 2011, it had a total population of 3,319, in 556 households.

== Demographics ==
As of 2011, Sugaon had a population of 3,319, in 556 households. This population was 53.7% male (1,782) and 46.3% female (1,537). The 0-6 age group numbered 576 (334 male and 242 female), or 17.4% of the total population. 1,439 residents were members of Scheduled Castes, or 43.4% of the total.

The 1981 census recorded Sugaon as having a population of 1,289 people, in 297 households.

The 1961 census recorded Sugaon as comprising 11 hamlets, with a total population of 1,256 people (681 male and 575 female), in 214 households and 183 physical houses. The area of the village was given as 1,795 acres.

== Infrastructure ==
As of 2011, Sugaon had 2 primary schools; it did not have any healthcare facilities. Drinking water was provided by well, hand pump, and tube well; there were no public toilets. The village had a post office but no public library; there was at least some access to electricity for all purposes. Streets were made of both kachcha and pakka materials.
