= Nawada, Jagir =

Village in Uttar Pradesh, India

Nawada
- Village
- Location in Uttar Pradesh, India
- Coordinates: 27.13987°N 79.15075°E
- Country: India
- State: Uttar Pradesh
- District: Mainpuri
- Tehsil: Bhongaon

Area
  - Total: 6.056 km^{2} (2.338 sq mi)

Population (2011)
  - Total: 1,489
  - Density: 245.9/km^{2} (636.8/sq mi)
- Time zone: UTC+5:30 (IST)

Nawada (Nawādā) is a village in Jagir block of Mainpuri district, Uttar Pradesh. As of 2011, it has a total population of 1,489, in 238 households.

== Demographics ==
As of 2011, Nawada had a population of 1,489, in 238 households. This population was 54.1% male (805) and 45.9% female (684). The 0-6 age group numbered 274 (160 male and 114 female), or 18.4% of the total population. 217 residents were members of Scheduled Castes, or 14.6% of the total.

The 1981 census recorded Nawada as having a population of 878 people, in 126 households.

The 1961 census recorded Nawada as comprising 4 hamlets, with a total population of 622 people (344 male and 278 female), in 103 households and 76 physical houses. The area of the village was given as 1,129 acres.

== Infrastructure ==
As of 2011, Nawada had 1 primary school; it did not have any healthcare facilities. Drinking water was provided by tap, well, hand pump, and tube well; there were no public toilets. The village did not have a post office or public library; there was at least some access to electricity for residential and agricultural purposes. Streets were made of both kachcha and pakka materials.
