= Ratanpur Kirkich =

Village in Uttar Pradesh, India

- Village
- Location in Uttar Pradesh, India
- Coordinates: 27.19676°N 79.17862°E
- Country: India
- State: Uttar Pradesh
- District: Mainpuri
- Tehsil: Bhongaon

Area
  - Total: 0.993 km^{2} (0.383 sq mi)

Population (2011)
  - Total: 932
  - Density: 939/km^{2} (2,430/sq mi)
- Time zone: UTC+5:30 (IST)

Ratanpur Kirkich is a village in Jagir block of Mainpuri district, Uttar Pradesh. As of 2011, it had a total population of 932, in 175 households.

== Demographics ==
As of 2011, Tiksuri had a population of 913, in 165 households. This population was 52.6% male (480) and 47.4% female (433). The 0-6 age group numbered 174 (97 male and 77 female), or 19.1% of the total population. 408 residents were members of Scheduled Castes, or 44.7% of the total.

The 1981 census recorded Ratanpur Kirkich as having a population of 486 people, in 83 households.

The 1961 census recorded Ratanpur Kirkich as comprising 1 hamlet, with a total population of 404 people (215 male and 189 female), in 78 households and 54 physical houses. The area of the village was given as 245 acres.

== Infrastructure ==
As of 2011, Ratanpur Kirkich had 1 primary school; it did not have any healthcare facilities. Drinking water was provided by hand pump; there were no public toilets. The village did not have a post office or public library; there was at least some access to electricity for all purposes. Streets were made of kachcha materials.
