= Kasadh =

Village in Uttar Pradesh, India

- Village
- Location in Uttar Pradesh, India
- Coordinates: 27.1041°N 79.18457°E
- Country: India
- State: Uttar Pradesh
- District: Mainpuri
- Tehsil: Bhongaon

Area
  - Total: 2.686 km^{2} (1.037 sq mi)

Population (2011)
  - Total: 787
  - Density: 293/km^{2} (759/sq mi)
- Time zone: UTC+5:30 (IST)

Kasadh (Kasādh) is a village in Jagir block of Mainpuri district, Uttar Pradesh, India. As of 2011, it had a total population of 787, in 143 households.

== Demographics ==
As of 2011, Kasadh had a population of 787, in 143 households. This population was 52.7% male (415) and 47.3% female (372). The 0-6 age group numbered 150 (94 male and 56 female), or 19.1% of the total population. 306 residents were members of Scheduled Castes, or 38.9% of the total.

The 1981 census recorded Kasadh as having a population of 503 people, in 82 households.

The 1961 census recorded Kasadh as comprising 2 hamlets, with a total population of 395 people (219 male and 176 female), in 62 households and 50 physical houses. The area of the village was given as 665 acres.

== Infrastructure ==
As of 2011, Kasadh had 1 primary school; it did not have any healthcare facilities. Drinking water was provided by well, hand pump, and tube well; there were no public toilets. The village had a post office but no public library; there was at least some access to electricity for all purposes. Streets were made of both kachcha and pakka materials.
