= Ajitganj =

Village in Uttar Pradesh, India

- Village
- Location in Uttar Pradesh, India
- Coordinates: 27.19712°N 79.09714°E
- Country: India
- State: Uttar Pradesh
- District: Mainpuri
- Tehsil: Bhongaon

Area
  - Total: 2.313 km^{2} (0.893 sq mi)

Population (2011)
  - Total: 2,504
  - Density: 1,083/km^{2} (2,804/sq mi)
- Time zone: UTC+5:30 (IST)
- PIN: 205120

Ajitganj (Ajītgañj) is a village in Jagir block of Mainpuri district, Uttar Pradesh. As of 2011, it has a total population of 2,504, in 397 households.

== Demographics ==
As of 2011, Ajitganj had a population of 2,504, in 397 households. This population was 50.4% male (1,263) and 49.6% female (1,241). The 0-6 age group numbered 405 (209 male and 196 female), or 16.2% of the total population. 579 residents were members of Scheduled Castes, or 23.1% of the total.

The 1981 census recorded Ajitganj as having a population of 1,404 people, in 263 households.

The 1961 census recorded Ajitganj as comprising 3 hamlets, with a total population of 1,058 people (575 male and 483 female), in 205 households and 162 physical houses. The area of the village was given as 592 acres and it had a post office at that point.

== Infrastructure ==
As of 2011, Ajitganj had 2 primary schools; it did not have any healthcare facilities. Drinking water was provided by well, hand pump, and tube well; there were no public toilets. The village had a post office but no public library; there was at least some access to electricity for residential and agricultural purposes. Streets were made of both kachcha and pakka materials.
