= Nakhatpur =

Village in Uttar Pradesh, India

- Village
- Location in Uttar Pradesh, India
- Coordinates: 27.202°N 79.12529°E
- Country: India
- State: Uttar Pradesh
- District: Mainpuri
- Tehsil: Bhongaon

Area
  - Total: 1.478 km^{2} (0.571 sq mi)

Population (2011)
  - Total: 935
  - Density: 633/km^{2} (1,640/sq mi)
- Time zone: UTC+5:30 (IST)

Nakhatpur (Nakhatpur) is a village in Jagir block of Mainpuri district, Uttar Pradesh, India. As of 2011, it had a total population of 935, in 161 households.

== Demographics ==
As of 2011, Nakhatpur had a population of 935, in 161 households. This population was 53.4% male (499) and 46.6% female (436). The 0-6 age group numbered 105 (55 male and 50 female), or 11.2% of the total population. 45 residents were members of Scheduled Castes, or 4.8% of the total.

The 1981 census recorded Nakhatpur as having a population of 645 people, in 100 households.

The 1961 census recorded Nakhatpur as comprising 1 hamlet, with a total population of 474 people (263 male and 211 female), in 82 households and 65 physical houses. The area of the village was given as 362 acres.

== Infrastructure ==
As of 2011, Nakhatpur had 1 primary school; it did not have any healthcare facilities. Drinking water was provided by hand pump; there were no public toilets. The village did not have a post office or public library; there was at least some access to electricity for all purposes. Streets were made of both kachcha and pakka materials.
