= Ratanpur Bara =

Village in Uttar Pradesh, India

- Village
- Location in Uttar Pradesh, India
- Coordinates: 27.19267°N 79.14157°E
- Country: India
- State: Uttar Pradesh
- District: Mainpuri
- Tehsil: Bhongaon

Area
  - Total: 3.48 km^{2} (1.34 sq mi)

Population (2011)
  - Total: 2,473
  - Density: 711/km^{2} (1,840/sq mi)
- Time zone: UTC+5:30 (IST)

Ratanpur Bara (Ratanpur Barā) is a village in Jagir block of Mainpuri district, Uttar Pradesh. As of 2011, it had a total population of 2,473, in 429 households.

== Demographics ==
As of 2011, Ratanpur Bara had a population of 2,473, in 429 households. This population was 53.9% male (1,333) and 46.1% female (1,140). The 0-6 age group numbered 412 (228 male and 184 female), or 16.7% of the total population. 1,226 residents were members of Scheduled Castes, or 49.6% of the total.

The 1981 census recorded Ratanpur Bara as having a population of 1,648 people, in 279 households.

The 1961 census recorded Ratanpur Bara as comprising 5 hamlets, with a total population of 1,234 people (667 male and 567 female), in 211 households and 168 physical houses. The area of the village was given as 968 acres.

== Infrastructure ==
As of 2011, Ratanpur Bara had 1 primary school and 1 primary health centre. Drinking water was provided by hand pump; there were no public toilets. The village had a post office but no public library; there was at least some access to electricity for all purposes. Streets were made of both kachcha and pakka materials.
