= Madhupuri =

Village in Uttar Pradesh, India

- Village
- Location in Uttar Pradesh, India
- Coordinates: 27.16733°N 79.12977°E
- Country: India
- State: Uttar Pradesh
- District: Mainpuri
- Tehsil: Bhongaon

Area
  - Total: 0.682 km^{2} (0.263 sq mi)

Population (2011)
  - Total: 500
  - Density: 730/km^{2} (1,900/sq mi)
- Time zone: UTC+5:30 (IST)

Madhupuri (Madhupurī) is a village in Jagir block of Mainpuri district, Uttar Pradesh, India. As of 2011, it hasd a total population of 500, in 81 households.

== Demographics ==
As of 2011, Madhupuri had a population of 500, in 81 households. This population was 52.6% male (263) and 47.4% female (237). The 0-6 age group numbered 83 (44 male and 39 female), or 16.6% of the total population. 328 residents were members of Scheduled Castes, or 65.6% of the total.

The 1981 census recorded Madhupuri as having a population of 248 people, in 51 households.

The 1961 census recorded Madhupuri (as "Madhpuri") as comprising 1 hamlets, with a total population of 202 people (106 male and 96 female), in 34 households and 20 physical houses. The area of the village was given as 169 acres.

== Infrastructure ==
As of 2011, Madhupuri had 1 primary school; it did not have any healthcare facilities. Drinking water was provided by hand pump and tube well; there were public toilets. The village had a post office but no public library; there was at least some access to electricity for all purposes. Streets were made of both kachcha and pakka materials.
