= Doongri (village) =

Village in Jaipur district, Rajasthan, India

Doongri डूंगरी
- Village
- Location within Rajasthan Location within India
- Coordinates: 27.1617°N 75.4890°E
- Country: India
- State: Rajasthan
- District: Jaipur
- Tehsil: Phulera

Government
  - Type: Gram panchayat

Area
  - Total: 776.48 ha (1,918.7 acres)

Population (2011)
  - Total: 2,375

Languages
  - Official: Hindi
- Time zone: UTC+5:30 (IST)
- PIN: 303603
- Census code: 079583

Doongri (also spelt Dungri or Doongari) is a village in Phulera tehsil of Jaipur district, Rajasthan, India. It lies about 50 kilometres (31 mi) west of Jaipur, near Sambhar, and forms its own gram panchayat. Under the former Jaipur State it was the seat of a thikana held by the Nathawat clan of the Kachhwaha Rajputs.

== Geography ==
Doongri lies in the semi-arid plain west of Jaipur, between the towns of Jobner and Phulera. The village has a total area of 776.48 hectares. The neighbouring villages of Doongri Kalan and Doongri Khurd are separate revenue villages. The nearest railway station is at Bobas on the Jaipur–Ahmedabad line, and the nearest post office is at Kishangarh Renwal.

== History ==
=== Foundation and the Nathawat clan ===
Doongri was a thikana (feudal estate) of the Nathawat sub-clan of the Kachhwahas, the ruling clan of Amber and later Jaipur State. The Nathawats descend from Natha ji, a grandson of Raja Prithviraj I of Amber (reigned 1503–1527), and were counted among the barah kotri ("twelve chambers"), the twelve senior noble houses of the Kachhwaha state whose chiefs formed the core of the Jaipur nobility and rendered military service to the Maharaja. The senior Nathawat seats were Chomu and Samode; according to the clan history compiled by Hanuman Sharma in 1937, Doongri was founded as a separate estate by Ram Sahai, Natha ji's second son, whose descendants also held Raisar, Morija and other villages in the same tract.

The estate ranked among the tazimi nobles of Jaipur — chiefs entitled to be received by the Maharaja rising from his seat in durbar — and its holders were bound to attend court and to furnish horsemen for the State's service.

=== Eighteenth century ===
In 1779 the Thakur of Doongri, Chood Singh Nathawat, was one of the commanders of the Jaipur force sent against Murtaza Khan Bhadech, a Mughal officer who had entered Shekhawati to collect revenue arrears and was marching on Jaipur. The Jaipur and Shekhawat contingents blocked his advance at Khatu Shyamji; in the battle that followed Chood Singh and his two sons were killed, but the imperial army was defeated and Murtaza Khan slain. The battle is counted among the notable engagements of eighteenth-century Rajasthan.

=== Nineteenth and twentieth centuries ===
The estate remained with the family through the colonial period. Thakurs of Doongri were among the Rajput nobility educated at Mayo College, Ajmer, from the 1880s: Thakur Fateh Singh of Doongri, son of Thakur Sheo Singh, entered the college in 1885.

In the twentieth century the family served in the Jaipur State Forces. During the Second World War, Thakur Devi Singh of Doongri raised and commanded the Auxiliary Qilejat Force, a unit formed in 1939–40 from re-enlisted pensioners and ex-servicemen of the State and Indian armies, and in June 1943, as a lieutenant-colonel, took charge of the State's military department.

Jaipur State acceded to India in 1949 and merged into the new state of Rajasthan. The jagirdari system, and with it the estate's feudal status, was abolished under the Rajasthan Land Reforms and Resumption of Jagirs Act, 1952. Doongri is today an ordinary revenue village administered by its own gram panchayat.

== Landmarks ==
The seat of the former thikana is Doongri Garh, a fortified residence (garh) of the Nathawat thakurs described as more than 400 years old. The fort stands at the edge of the village, on land recorded in the adjoining revenue village of Doongri Khurd. In December 2020 the Rajasthan Department of Tourism issued Doongri Garh a heritage certificate, the recognition under which historic private buildings in the state may be operated as heritage hotels; it has since been run as a small heritage hotel.

== Demographics ==
At the 2011 Census of India, Doongri had 352 households and a population of 2,375, of whom 1,210 were male and 1,165 female. Children aged six or under numbered 319. The literacy rate was 70.0 per cent (82.9 per cent for males and 56.5 per cent for females), against a state average of 66.1 per cent. Scheduled Castes made up 7.6 per cent of the population and Scheduled Tribes 0.2 per cent.

== Notable people ==
- Chood Singh Nathawat, Thakur of Doongri, killed at the Battle of Khatu Shyamji (1779)
- Thakur Fateh Singh of Doongri (born 1872), Nathawat jagirdar of Doongri, one of the earliest students educated at Mayo College, Ajmer (1885–1890); listed among the principal jagirdars of Jaipur State in 1935.
- Colonel Thakur Devi Singh of Doongri, Commanding Officer of the Auxiliary and Qilejat Force of Jaipur State from June 1943, following which he led Jaipur States military department.
- Major Thakur Durga Das of Doongri (1925–2015), son of Col. Thakur Devi Singh, educated at Mayo College (batch of 1946), an officer of the Jodhpur State Forces and later the 8th Light Cavalry of the Indian Army, who served in the 1962, 1965 and 1971 wars; he married Shankar Kumari, daughter of Maj.-Gen. Rao Manohar Singh of Bedla.
- Colonel Thakur Bhawani Singh of Doongri (born 1958), Indian Army officer who commanded the President's Bodyguard (2002–2005) and the 61st Cavalry, and captained India at polo. Educated at Mayo College, Ajmer (batch of 1974), he is Chairman of the Mayo College Committee and President of the Mayo College Old Boys' Society.
- Kunwar Dhruv Raj Singh of Doongri (born 1984), entrepreneur, founder of the housing-design company MADE INDIA. His 2026 marriage in Austria to Countess Marie von und zu Eltz of the House of Eltz, a descendant of Ludwig III of Bavaria and Cornelius Vanderbilt, was reported internationally as the first ever union between Indian and European aristocracy.

== See also ==
- List of villages in Jaipur district
- Kachhwaha
