= Manchhana =

Village in Uttar Pradesh, India

- Village
- Location in Uttar Pradesh, India
- Coordinates: 27.19002°N 79.06246°E
- Country: India
- State: Uttar Pradesh
- District: Mainpuri
- Tehsil: Bhongaon

Area
  - Total: 11.381 km^{2} (4.394 sq mi)

Population (2011)
  - Total: 6,201
  - Density: 544.9/km^{2} (1,411/sq mi)
- Time zone: UTC+5:30 (IST)

Manchhana (Mañchhanā) is a village in Jagir block of Mainpuri district, Uttar Pradesh. It was once a taluqa headquarters. As of 2011, it had a total population of 6,201, in 1,082 households.

== Geography ==
Manchhana is located about 6 km southeast of Mainpuri on the road leading to Saman. The village lands include several subsidiary hamlets and completely surround the separate village of Nagla Soti.

According to the 2011 census, Manchhana has a total area of 1,138.1 hectares, of which 799.6 were currently farmland, 0.2 were fallow lands, and 69.8 were under non-agricultural use. 268.5 hectares were classified as cultivable but not currently under any agricultural use, and 0 were classified as non-cultivable. No forests, orchards, or permanent pastures existed on village lands.

== History ==
Manchhana was historically the seat of a separate taluqa, which by the turn of the 20th century had been redistributed between Mainpuri and Bhongaon.

== Demographics ==
As of 2011, Manchhana had a population of 6,201, in 1,082 households. This population was 53.4% male (3,309) and 46.6% female (2,892). The 0-6 age group numbered 994 (545 male and 449 female), or 16.0% of the total population. 2,626 residents were members of Scheduled Castes, or 42.3% of the total.

The 1981 census recorded Manchhana as having a population of 3,868 people, in 715 households.

The 1961 census recorded Manchhana as comprising 10 hamlets, with a total population of 2,804 people (1,517 male and 1,287 female), in 561 households and 358 physical houses. The area of the village was given as 2,780 acres and it had a post office and medical practitioner at that point.

As of 1901, Manchhana had 7 subsidiary hamlets and a total population of exactly 2,161; it had a school at that point.

== Infrastructure ==
As of 2011, Manchhana had 2 primary schools; it did not have any healthcare facilities. Drinking water was provided by tap and hand pump; there were no public toilets. The village had a post office but no public library; there was at least some access to electricity for residential and agricultural purposes. Streets were made of both kachcha and pakka materials.
