= Aung, Mainpuri =

Village in Uttar Pradesh, India

Aung
- Village
- Location in Uttar Pradesh, India
- Coordinates: 27.17416°N 79.1983°E
- Country: India
- State: Uttar Pradesh
- District: Mainpuri
- Tehsil: Bhongaon

Area
  - Total: 12.629 km^{2} (4.876 sq mi)

Population (2011)
  - Total: 7,356
  - Density: 582.5/km^{2} (1,509/sq mi)
- Time zone: UTC+5:30 (IST)
- PIN: 205262

Aung (Auṅg) is a village in Jagir block of Mainpuri district, Uttar Pradesh. As of 2011, it had a total population of 7,356, in 1,240 households.

== Geography ==
Aung is located about 10 km southeast of Bhongaon. It features a local irrigation canal that brings water to the village's farms.

According to the 2011 census, Aung has a total area of 1,262.9 hectares, of which 1,069.4 were farmland, 93.5 were fallow lands, and 87.1 were under non-agricultural use. 2.4 hectares were occupied by orchards, 0.8 were occupied by permanent pastures, 9.7 were classified as cultivable but not currently under any agricultural use, and 0 were classified as non-cultivable. No forests could be found on village lands.

== Culture ==
Aung hosts an annual fair in honour of Devi during the month of Chait. There are two old temples in the village that were described as a structure of “some antiquity” at the turn of the 20th century.

== Demographics ==
As of 2011, Aung had a population of 7,356, in 1,240 households. This population was composed of 52.7% male (3,873) and 47.3% female (3,483). The 0-6 age group numbered 1,220 (641 male and 579 female), or 16.6% of the total population. 1,060 residents were members of Scheduled Castes, or 14.4% of the total.

The 1981 census recorded Aung as having a population of 4,682 people, in 856 households.

The 1961 census recorded Aung with a composition of 13 hamlets, and a total population of 3,914 people (2,093 male and 1,821 female), in 715 households and 471 physical houses. The area of the village was given as 3,182 acres and it had a post office at that point.

As of 1901, Aung had 22 hamlets and a total population of exactly 3,000.

== Infrastructure ==
As of 2011, Aung had 3 primary schools and 1 primary health centre. Drinking water was provided by hand pump and tube well; there were no public toilets. The village had a post office but no public library; there was at least some access to electricity for all purposes. Streets were made of both kachcha and pakka materials.
