= Rajpur Kalan, Mainpuri =

Village in Uttar Pradesh, India

Rajpur Kalan
- Village
- Location in Uttar Pradesh, India
- Coordinates: 27.09163°N 79.12137°E
- Country: India
- State: Uttar Pradesh
- District: Mainpuri
- Tehsil: Bhongaon

Area
  - Total: 4.271 km^{2} (1.649 sq mi)

Population (2011)
  - Total: 1,674
  - Density: 391.9/km^{2} (1,015/sq mi)
- Time zone: UTC+5:30 (IST)

Rajpur Kalan (Rājpur Kalān) is a village in Jagir block of Mainpuri district, Uttar Pradesh. As of 2011, it had a total population of 1,674, in 251 households.

== Demographics ==
As of 2011, Rajpur Kalan had a population of 1,674, in 251 households. This population was 53.0% male (887) and 47.0% female (787). The 0-6 age group numbered 271 (135 male and 136 female), or 16.2% of the total population. 229 residents were members of Scheduled Castes, or 13.7% of the total.

The 1981 census recorded Rajpur Kalan as having a population of 843 people, in 143 households.

The 1961 census recorded Rajpur Kalan as comprising 2 hamlets, with a total population of 552 people (309 male and 243 female), in 114 households and 96 physical houses. The area of the village was given as 1,055 acres.

== Infrastructure ==
As of 2011, Rajpur Kalan had 1 primary school; it did not have any healthcare facilities. Drinking water was provided by hand pump; there were no public toilets. The village did not have a post office or public library; there was at least some access to electricity for all purposes. Streets were made of kachcha materials.

== See also ==
- Rajpur Khurd, Mainpuri
