= Sumerpur, Mainpuri =

Village in Uttar Pradesh, India

Sumerpur
- Village
- Location in Uttar Pradesh, India
- Coordinates: 27.08847°N 79.15845°E
- Country: India
- State: Uttar Pradesh
- District: Mainpuri
- Tehsil: Bhongaon

Area
  - Total: 1.274 km^{2} (0.492 sq mi)

Population (2011)
  - Total: 555
  - Density: 436/km^{2} (1,130/sq mi)
- Time zone: UTC+5:30 (IST)

Sumerpur (Sumerpur) is a village in Jagir block of Mainpuri district, Uttar Pradesh. As of 2011, it has a total population of 555, in 99 households.

== Demographics ==
As of 2011, Sumerpur had a population of 55, in 99 households. This population was 52.6% male (286) and 47.4% female (269). The 0-6 age group numbered 97 (54 male and 43 female), or 19.1% of the total population. 219 residents were members of Scheduled Castes, or 44.7% of the total.

The 1981 census recorded Sumerpur as having a population of 358 people, in 74 households.

The 1961 census recorded Sumerpur as comprising 2 hamlets, with a total population of 148 people (89 male and 59 female), in 35 households and 21 physical houses. The area of the village was given as 323 acres.

== Infrastructure ==
As of 2011, Sumerpur had 1 primary school; it did not have any healthcare facilities. Drinking water was provided by tap, well, hand pump, and tube well; there were no public toilets. The village had a post office but no public library; there was at least some access to electricity for all purposes. Streets were made of both kachcha and pakka materials.
