= Dayarampur =

Village in Uttar Pradesh, India

- Village
- Location in Uttar Pradesh, India
- Coordinates: 27.20453°N 79.1421°E
- Country: India
- State: Uttar Pradesh
- District: Mainpuri
- Tehsil: Bhongaon

Area
  - Total: 0.786 km^{2} (0.303 sq mi)

Population (2011)
  - Total: 262
  - Density: 333/km^{2} (863/sq mi)
- Time zone: UTC+5:30 (IST)

Dayarampur (Dayārāmpur) is a village in Jagir block of Mainpuri district, Uttar Pradesh, India. As of 2011, it had a total population of 262, in 48 households.

== Demographics ==
As of 2011, Dayarampur had a population of 262, in 48 households. This population was 52.3% male (137) and 47.7% female (125). The 0-6 age group numbered 26 (8 male and 18 female), or 9.9% of the total population. 34 residents were members of Scheduled Castes, or 13.0% of the total.

The 1981 census recorded Dayarampur as having a population of 169 people, in 25 households.

The 1961 census recorded Dayarampur as comprising 1 hamlet, with a total population of 83 people (48 male and 35 female), in 20 households and 14 physical houses. The area of the village was given as 198 acres.

== Infrastructure ==
As of 2011, Dayarampur had 2 primary schools; it did not have any healthcare facilities. Drinking water was provided by hand pump; there were no public toilets. The village had a post office but no public library; there was at least some access to electricity for agricultural and commercial, but not residential, purposes. Streets were made of both kachcha and pakka materials.
