= Rajalpur =

Village in Uttar Pradesh, India

- Village
- Location in Uttar Pradesh, India
- Coordinates: 27.19727°N 79.08761°E
- Country: India
- State: Uttar Pradesh
- District: Mainpuri
- Tehsil: Bhongaon

Area
  - Total: 0.872 km^{2} (0.337 sq mi)

Population (2011)
  - Total: 1,048
  - Density: 1,200/km^{2} (3,110/sq mi)
- Time zone: UTC+5:30 (IST)

Rajalpur (Rājalpur) is a village in Jagir block of Mainpuri district, Uttar Pradesh. As of 2011, it has a total population of 1,048, in 185 households.

== Demographics ==
As of 2011, Rajalpur had a population of 1,048, in 185 households. This population was 54.6% male (572) and 45.4% female (476). The 0-6 age group numbered 146 (88 male and 58 female), or 13.9% of the total population. No residents were members of Scheduled Castes.

The 1981 census recorded Rajalpur as having a population of 674 people, in 122 households.

The 1961 census recorded Rajalpur as comprising 3 hamlets, with a total population of 461 people (241 male and 220 female), in 85 households and 61 physical houses. The area of the village was given as 252 acres.

== Infrastructure ==
As of 2011, Rajalpur had 1 primary school; it did not have any healthcare facilities. Drinking water was provided by well, hand pump, and tube well; there were no public toilets. The village had a post office but no public library; there was at least some access to electricity for residential and agricultural purposes. Streets were made of both kachcha and pakka materials.
