= Mirapur Gujrati =

Village in Uttar Pradesh, India

- Village
- Location in Uttar Pradesh, India
- Coordinates: 27.21355°N 79.13779°E
- Country: India
- State: Uttar Pradesh
- District: Mainpuri
- Tehsil: Bhongaon

Area
  - Total: 2.42 km^{2} (0.93 sq mi)

Population (2011)
  - Total: 1,331
  - Density: 550/km^{2} (1,420/sq mi)
- Time zone: UTC+5:30 (IST)

Mirapur Gujrati (Mīrāpur Gujrātī), also spelled Meerapur Gujarati, is a village in Jagir block of Mainpuri district, Uttar Pradesh, India. As of 2011, it has a total population of 1,331, in 236 households.

== Demographics ==
As of 2011, Mirapur Gujrati had a population of 1,331, in 236 households. This population was 53.7% male (715) and 46.3% female (616). The 0-6 age group numbered 173 (93 male and 80 female), or 13.0% of the total population. 305 residents were members of Scheduled Castes, or 22.9% of the total.

The 1981 census recorded Mirapur Gujrati as having a population of 879 people, in 168 households.

The 1961 census recorded Mirapur Gujrati as comprising 1 hamlet, with a total population of 711 people (393 male and 318 female), in 126 households and 96 physical houses. The area of the village was given as 602 acres, and it was then part of Bewar block.

== Infrastructure ==
As of 2011, Mirapur Gujrati had 1 primary school; it did not have any healthcare facilities. Drinking water was provided by hand pump; there were no public toilets. The village did not have a post office or public library; there was at least some access to electricity for all purposes. Streets were made of both kachcha and pakka materials.
