= Bhanwat =

Village in Uttar Pradesh, India

- Village
- Location in Uttar Pradesh, India
- Coordinates: 27.15699°N 79.07658°E
- Country: India
- State: Uttar Pradesh
- District: Mainpuri
- Tehsil: Bhongaon

Area
  - Total: 11.054 km^{2} (4.268 sq mi)

Population (2011)
  - Total: 7,025
  - Density: 635.5/km^{2} (1,646/sq mi)
- Time zone: UTC+5:30 (IST)

Bhanwat (or Bhā̃wat) is a village in Jagir block of Mainpuri district, Uttar Pradesh, India. It is located about 10 km south of Mainpuri, on the north bank of the Kanpur branch of the Lower Ganga Canal. A bridge crosses the canal at the village. As of 2011, Bhanwat had a total population of 7,025, in 1,088 households.

== Geography ==
Bhanwat is located about 10 km south of Mainpuri, the district headquarters. The village is on a high mound, or khera, and there is a large jhil to the northeast. The Kanpur branch of the Lower Ganga Canal passes by Bhanwat on the south, and there is a bridge across the canal here.

According to the 2011 census, Bhanwat has a total area of 1,105.4 hectares, of which 445.1 were currently farmland, 0 were fallow lands, and 200.0 were under non-agricultural use. 355.0 hectares were occupied by orchards, 0 were occupied by permanent pastures, 105.2 were classified as cultivable but not currently under any agricultural use, and 0 were classified as non-cultivable. No forests existed on village lands.

== Demographics ==
As of 2011, Bhanwat had a population of 7,025, in 1,088 households. This population was 53.9% male (3,787) and 46.1% female (3,238). The 0-6 age group numbered 1,136 (603 male and 533 female), or 16.2% of the total population. 881 residents were members of Scheduled Castes, or 12.5% of the total.

The 1981 census recorded Bhanwat (as "Bhanwant") as having a population of 3,545 people, in 605 households.

The 1961 census recorded Bhanwat (as "Bhanwant") as comprising 13 hamlets, with a total population of 2,437 people (1,359 male and 1,078 female), in 485 households and 396 physical houses. The area of the village was given as 3,144 acres and it had a post office at that point.

As of 1901, Bhanwat had 11 hamlets and a total population of 2,112. There was a canal bungalow by the bridge over the canal.

== Infrastructure ==
As of 2011, Bhanwat had 1 primary schools and 1 maternity and child welfare centre. Drinking water was provided by tap and hand pump; there were no public toilets. The village had a post office but no public library; there was at least some access to electricity for all purposes. Streets were made of both kachcha and pakka materials.
