= Rajpur Khurd, Mainpuri =

Village in Uttar Pradesh, India

Rajpur Khurd
- Village
- Location in Uttar Pradesh, India
- Coordinates: 27.1893°N 79.17884°E
- Country: India
- State: Uttar Pradesh
- District: Mainpuri
- Tehsil: Bhongaon

Area
  - Total: 0.674 km^{2} (0.260 sq mi)

Population (2011)
  - Total: 333
  - Density: 494/km^{2} (1,280/sq mi)
- Time zone: UTC+5:30 (IST)

Rajpur Khurd (Rājpur Khurd) is a village in Jagir block of Mainpuri district, Uttar Pradesh, India. As of 2011, it had a total population of 333, in 48 households.

== Demographics ==
As of 2011, Rajpur Khurd had a population of 333, in 48 households. This population was 55.0% male (183) and 45.0% female (150). The 0-6 age group numbered 50 (27 male and 23 female), or 15.0% of the total population. No residents were members of Scheduled Castes.

The 1981 census recorded Rajpur Khurd as having a population of 199 people, in 42 households.

The 1961 census recorded Rajpur Khurd as comprising 2 hamlets, with a total population of 52 people (31 male and 21 female), in 13 households and 8 physical houses. The area of the village was given as 176 acres.

== Infrastructure ==
As of 2011, Rajpur Khurd did not have any schools or healthcare facilities. Drinking water was provided by hand pump; there were no public toilets. The village had a post office but no public library; there was at least some access to electricity for all purposes. Streets were made of kachcha materials.

== See also ==
- Rajpur Kalan, Mainpuri
