= Nagla Miti =

Village in Uttar Pradesh, India

- Village
- Location in Uttar Pradesh, India
- Coordinates: 27.10085°N 79.11372°E
- Country: India
- State: Uttar Pradesh
- District: Mainpuri
- Tehsil: Bhongaon

Area
  - Total: 2.733 km^{2} (1.055 sq mi)

Population (2011)
  - Total: 673
  - Density: 246/km^{2} (638/sq mi)
- Time zone: UTC+5:30 (IST)

Nagla Miti (Naglā Miti) is a village in Jagir block of Mainpuri district, Uttar Pradesh, India. As of 2011, it had a total population of 673, in 96 households.

== Demographics ==
As of 2011, Nagla Miti had a population of 673, in 96 households. This population was 51.9% male (349) and 48.1% female (324). The 0-6 age group numbered 102 (52 male and 50 female), or 15.2% of the total population. 8 residents were members of Scheduled Castes, or 1.2% of the total.

The 1981 census recorded Nagla Miti as having a population of 378 people, in 48 households.

The 1961 census recorded Nagla Miti as comprising 2 hamlets, with a total population of 221 people (123 male and 98 female), in 35 households and 28 physical houses. The area of the village was given as 675 acres.

== Infrastructure ==
As of 2011, Nagla Miti had 1 primary school; it did not have any healthcare facilities. Drinking water was provided by well, hand pump, and tube well/borehole; there were no public toilets. The village had a post office but no public library; there was at least some access to electricity for all purposes. Streets were made of pakka materials.
