= Durga Das (army officer) =

Indian Army cavalry officer (1925–2015)

- Durga Das at Mayo College
- Born: 1925; Jaipur State, British India
- Died: 2015 (aged 89–90)
- Relatives: Col. Bhawani Singh (son); Maharaj Prem Singh (brother-in-law); Manohar Singh of Bedla (father-in-law)
- Military career
- Allegiance: India
- Branch: Jodhpur State Forces; Indian Army
- Rank: Major
- Units: Durga Horse, Jodhpur State Forces; 8th Light Cavalry
- Commands: C Squadron, 8th Light Cavalry
- Conflicts: Operation Vijay (1961); Sino-Indian War (1962); Indo-Pakistani War of 1965; Indo-Pakistani War of 1971

Durga Das (also written Durga Dass; 1925–2015) was an Indian Army officer of the 8th Light Cavalry and a member of the Nathawat family of Doongri, a thikana of the former Jaipur State in Rajasthan. He served with the regiment in the liberation of Goa in 1961, the Sino-Indian War of 1962 and the 1965 and 1971 wars with Pakistan. As a major he commanded its C Squadron in 1962, when the regiment moved its AMX-13 light tanks up to the Nathu La pass in Sikkim.

== Early life ==
Durga Das was a son of Thakur Devi Singh of Doongri, an officer of the Jaipur State Forces who raised the State's Auxiliary Qileja Force in 1939–40 and, as a lieutenant-colonel, took charge of the State's military department in June 1943. The Doongri family belongs to the Nathawat clan of the Kachhwaha Rajputs, which held the estate under Jaipur State.

Durga Das playing cycle polo at the Indian Military Academy

== Military career ==
Durga Das began his service as a state officer cadet in the Durga Horse, the bodyguard regiment of the Jodhpur State Forces, alongside Shaitan Singh, who was later awarded the Param Vir Chakra for the Battle of Rezang La. Shaitan Singh's biographer records that "in Durga Horse, Shaitan already had Hari Singh, a classmate, and Durga Das from Jaipur state, who were also state officer cadets". After the State Forces were absorbed into the Indian Army he served in the 8th Light Cavalry, an armoured regiment of the Indian Armoured Corps.

Shaitan Singh & Durga Das as cadets in the Durga Horse

The regiment, equipped from the late 1950s with French-built AMX-13 light tanks, took part in Operation Vijay, the liberation of Goa, in December 1961, with Durga Das among its officers. In late 1962, during the war with China, the regiment drove its AMX-13s up the road to the Nathu La pass on the Sikkim–Tibet border, a height of about 14,000 feet (4,300 m); the regimental history describes the move as "a feat never performed or attempted before anywhere in the world". Durga Das, then a major, was the officer commanding C Squadron on the deployment, and his photograph of an AMX-13 at the pass has been reproduced in later accounts of Indian armour at high altitude. The tanks were not engaged: the fighting of 1962 took place in Ladakh and the North-East Frontier Agency, and the Sikkim sector saw no action until the Nathu La and Cho La clashes of 1967.

Durga Das in action with the 8th Light Cavalry

Durga Das went on to serve with the regiment in the Indo-Pakistani War of 1965, in which it fought in the Battle of Asal Uttar near Khem Karan and was awarded the battle honour "Punjab", and in the Indo-Pakistani War of 1971, in which it fought with Vijayanta tanks in the Chhamb–Akhnoor sector.

== Personal life ==
Durga Das married Shankar Kumari, a daughter of Major-General Rao Manohar Singh of Bedla, a former Prime Minister of Udaipur State. Their son, Bhawani Singh, also served in the 8th Light Cavalry before transferring to the 61st Cavalry, and played polo for India. His sister Gulab Kanwar married Maharaj Prem Singh of Jodhpur, the polo player and first Arjuna Award winner for the sport.
