= Hatpau =

Village in Uttar Pradesh, India

- Village
- Location in Uttar Pradesh, India
- Coordinates: 27.1635267°N 79.1324755°E
- Country: India
- State: Uttar Pradesh
- District: Mainpuri
- Tehsil: Bhongaon

Area
  - Total: 15.585 km^{2} (6.017 sq mi)

Population (2011)
  - Total: 6,830
  - Density: 438/km^{2} (1,140/sq mi)
- Time zone: UTC+5:30 (IST)
- PIN: 205120

Hatpau (Hatpaū) is a village in Jagir block of Mainpuri district, Uttar Pradesh. It is a dispersed site that comprises about 20 hamlets. A prominent mound with the ruins of an old fort is an important local landmark. As of 2011, Hatpau has a total population of 6,830, in 1,240 households.

== Geography ==
Hatpau is located about 14 km northeast of Mainpuri, the district headquarters. A prominent local landmark is an old abandoned mound, or khera, where the ruins of an old fort still exist. Next to this is a jhil.

According to the 2011 census, Hatpau has a total area of 1,558.5 hectares, of which 1,349.7 were currently farmland, 18.8 were fallow lands, and 121.0 were under non-agricultural use. 1.5 hectares were occupied by orchards, 7.6 were occupied by permanent pastures, 20.4 were classified as cultivable but not currently under any agricultural use, and 6.4 were classified as non-cultivable. 32.7 hectares of forest existed on village lands.

== Demographics ==
As of 2011, Hatpau had a population of 6,830, in 1,240 households. This population was 53.1% male (3,625) and 46.9% female (3,205). The 0-6 age group numbered 1,193 (616 male and 577 female), or 17.5% of the total population. 2,678 residents were members of Scheduled Castes, or 39.2% of the total.

The 1981 census recorded Hatpau as having a population of 3,619 people, in 688 households.

The 1961 census recorded Hatpau as comprising 20 hamlets, with a total population of 2,735 people (1,487 male and 1,248 female), in 522 households and 423 physical houses. The area of the village was given as 3,655 acres and it had a post office at that point.

As of 1901, Hatpau had 20 hamlets and a total population of 2,259.

== Infrastructure ==
As of 2011, Hatpau had 3 primary schools and 1 maternity and child welfare centre. Drinking water was provided by hand pump; there were no public toilets. The village had a post office but no public library; there was at least some access to electricity for all purposes. Streets were made of both kachcha and pakka materials.
