= Birpur Kalan =

Village in Uttar Pradesh, India

- Village
- Location in Uttar Pradesh, India
- Coordinates: 27.09442°N 79.1697°E
- Country: India
- State: Uttar Pradesh
- District: Mainpuri
- Tehsil: Bhongaon

Area
  - Total: 3.965 km^{2} (1.531 sq mi)

Population (2011)
  - Total: 3,621
  - Density: 913.2/km^{2} (2,365/sq mi)
- Time zone: UTC+5:30 (IST)

Birpur Kalan (Bīrpur Kalān) is a village in Jagir block of Mainpuri district, Uttar Pradesh. As of 2011, it had a total population of 3,621, in 515 households.

== Demographics ==
As of 2011, Birpur Kalan had a population of 3,621, in 515 households. This population was 54.2% male (1,962) and 45.8% female (1,659). The 0-6 age group numbered 597 (322 male and 275 female), or 16.5% of the total population. 323 residents were members of Scheduled Castes, or 8.9% of the total.

The 1981 census recorded Birpur Kalan as having a population of 1,805 people, in 319 households.

The 1961 census recorded Birpur Kalan as comprising 5 hamlets, with a total population of 1,276 people (676 male and 600 female), in 248 households and 179 physical houses. The area of the village was given as 991 acres.

== Infrastructure ==
As of 2011, Birpur Kalan had 1 primary school; it did not have any healthcare facilities. Drinking water was provided by tap, well, hand pump, and tube well; there were no public toilets. The village had a post office but no public library; there was at least some access to electricity for all purposes. Streets were made of both kachcha and pakka materials.

== See also ==
- Birpur Khurd
