= Kohlian =

- Location within Pakistan
- Coordinates: 32.26°N 72.50°E
- Country: Pakistan
- Province: Punjab
- District: Sargodha
- Elevation: 190 m (620 ft)
- Time zone: UTC+5 (PST)

Kohlian is a village in Sargodha District in the Punjab Province of Pakistan. It is located at 32°26'0N 72°50'0E with an altitude of 190 metres (626 feet).
