= Prithviraj =

Prithviraj, Pruthviraj or Prithvi Raj may refer to:

== Mononym ==
- Prithviraja I (r. c. 1090-1110), Indian king from the Shakambhari Chahamana dynasty
- Prithviraja II (r. c. 1165-1169), Indian king from the Shakambhari Chahamana dynasty
- Prithviraja III (r. c. 1178–1192), better known as Prithviraj Chauhan, Indian king from the Shakambhari Chahamana dynasty
- Prithviraj Singh I (r. c. 1503–1527), Indian king of Amber
- Prudhvi Raj (born 1964), Indian Telugu actor, known as Pruthviraj
- Prithvi Raj (cricketer), Indian cricketer

== Given name ==
- Prithviraj Chavan (born 1946), Indian politician, chief minister of Maharashtra
- Prithviraj Kapoor (1906–1972), Indian theatre and film actor
- Prithviraj Sukumaran (born 1982), Indian actor, director and producer
- Prudhvi Raj, Indian actor
- Nuggehalli Rangaraj Prithviraj, Kannada actor
- Prithvirajsing Roopun, Indo-Mauritian politician, seventh President of Mauritius

== Other uses ==
- Babloo Prithviraj (born 1966), Tamil and Telugu film and television actor
- Pruthviraj (film), 1992 Indian Kannada-language film by Renuka Sharma
- Samrat Prithviraj, a 2022 Indian Hindi-language film by Chandraprakash Dwivedi
- Prithviraj Road, a road in New Delhi

== See also ==
- Pithora (disambiguation), alternate rendition of Prithviraj
- Prithviraj Chauhan (disambiguation)
