= Bishwajit Bhattacharjee =

Indian researcher

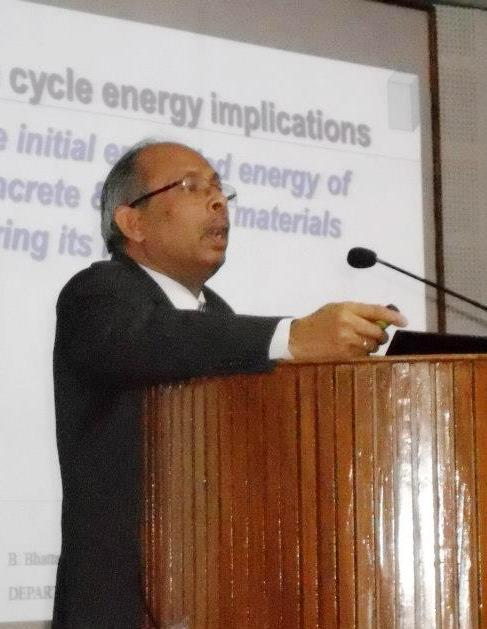
Prof.Bhattacharjee at UKIERI 2014

Dr. Bishwajit Bhattacharjee is an Indian researcher and a renowned academic with prominence in the areas of concrete technology and building science. He is a Professor in the Department of Civil Engineering at IIT Delhi. Dr. Bhattacharjee has been an active stalwart of fundamental concrete research in India.

== Education ==
Born in Silchar, a modest city in the North-Eastern state of Assam in India, Bhattacharjee had his initial education in the nearby town of Hailakandi and later at Silchar. Since his days of schooling, he had a keen interest in science which drew him towards prolific reading of contemporary science magazines and books at the district library of Silchar. He graduated with BTech (Hons.) from IIT Kharagpur in 1978 and thereafter worked for M/s Gammon India Limited for a short period of two years. Subsequently he obtained his MTech(Hons.) in Construction Management from IIT Delhi in the year 1982 and soon after joined the institute as a Senior Research Assistant and as a teaching faculty in 1985. He later went on to obtain a PhD from the Centre for Material Science and Technology at IIT Delhi in 1990.

== Curriculum development ==
Dr. Bhattacharjee has been involved in developing several courses in the domains of materials, construction technology and building science being taught at IIT Delhi. He has been the main architect behind formulating the syllabus for L&TECC sponsored M.Tech.(BIS) program in Construction Technology and Management at IIT Delhi that commenced in 1998 and is still continuing. Dr. Bhattacharjee has also been instrumental in starting a two way video conference mode PG program in Construction Engineering and Management for students of Addis Ababa University, Ethiopia, under MOU between Ministry of Education Government of Ethiopia and IIT Delhi. He also has to his credit the development of Materials Research Laboratory in the Department of Civil Engineering, IIT Delhi. The lab presently supports diverse research activities being pursued in the areas of material characterization and performance.

== Research activities ==
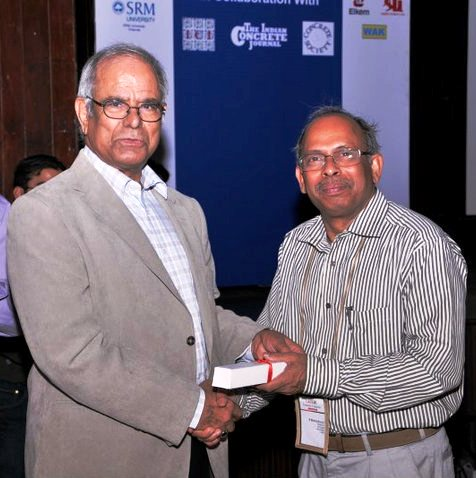
Pro.R.K.Dhir and Prof.B.Bhattacharjee

Dr. Bhattacharjee has been pursuing research in the realms of concrete technology, construction materials and building sciences. His contributions in the area of micro-structural characterisation of cement based materials through implementation of Mercury Intrusion Porosimetry (MIP) and Back Scattered Electron Microscopy (BSE) have been of particular prominence. His findings on the porosity and pore size distribution of concrete and its relation to in situ strength continue to remain very well acclaimed amongst the scientific community. His expositions on the effective implementation of MIP for study of pore size distribution of cement based materials are also well accepted. His deliberations in the sphere of rebar corrosion in RC structures and efforts on modelling of chloride diffusion in concrete are widely cited.

In the area of building sciences, Dr. Bhattacharjee has been working on Energy Efficient Building Design with special emphasis on the development of the concept of Overall Thermal Transfer Values (OTTV) for Indian conditions. Implementation of advanced soft computing techniques such as Artificial Neural Networks (ANN), Genetic Algorithm (GA) and Fuzzy Set Theory (FST) for effective solution of engineering problems has also been a trait of his research pursuits. His work in the development and implementation of Fuzzy based Structural Condition Assessment procedures and GA based Energy Optimization Design of Buildings bears a special significance in this regard.

Apart from his involvement in several sponsored research projects at national and inter-national levels, Dr. Bhattacharjee has guided over 150 MTech and 11 PhD projects at IIT Delhi while many others presently remain under progress. The findings of these intensive research projects, pursued over the years under his guidance have been published in the form of more than 100 journal and conference papers with greater than 500 citations and h-index of 12 (Scopus). Dr. Bhattacharjee continues to contribute to Indian Concrete Journal on regular basis as author and also listed as a reviewer. He is also involved as a researcher in the Swiss-Indo-Cuban project for the development of eco-friendly cement.

== Professional activities ==
In appreciation of his contributions made in the sphere of cement and concrete technology, Dr. Bhattacharjee has been nominated in the editorial board of the Magazine of Concrete Research, an international technical journal published by Thomas Telford Ltd., London. He also holds the editorial membership of the International Journal of 3R's, published by Dr. Fixit Institute, India.

He is also member of Research Council of Central Building Research Institute (CBRI) and National Council for Cement and Building Materials (NCCBM), Governing council of Dr. Fixit Laboratory and The Energy and Resources Institute (TERI) academic advisory board.

He is also the faculty coordinator of the popular video course on Civil Engineering Materials available online under the aegis of National Programme on Technology Enhanced Learning.

== Recognition ==
- Dr. Bhattacharjee has been conferred with the Life Time Achievement Award (North) by the Indian Concrete Institute in 2013.
- The Indian Concrete Journal in August 2012 issue, published a biosketch of Dr.Bhattacharjee with the title "A teacher and research worker" under the feature of distinguished people.
- Structural Engineering Forum of India (SEFI) published his profile in 2012 under the heading- Gems of Structural Engineering:Prof.Bishwajit Bhattacharjee.
