= Love in Ukraine =

Indian romantic drama film

Love In Ukraine is a 2022 Indian Hindi-language romantic drama film directed by Nitin Kumar Gupta and starring Vipin Kaushik and Lizabeta. The film was released theatrically on 27 May 2022.

== Plot ==
The film follows an Indian student named Raj (Kaushik) who falls in love with Liza (Lizabeta), a Russian girl set to get married into a mafia family. Their romance develops against the backdrop of cultural differences in Ukraine.

== Cast ==
- Vipin Kaushik as Raj
- Lizabeta as Liza
- Nitin Kumar Gupta as Lasha
- Mikhael Striga
- Lolita Zhuravlova
- Roman Batrin
- Ruslan Seferov
- Oles Dmitrenco
- Irma Balan
- Konstantin Shiryaev
- Vladimir Didenco
- Sergey Pschenichniy

== Production ==
The film was shot entirely on location in Ukraine, including cities such as Kyiv, Bucha, and Odessa. Filming began in October–November 2021 with some patchwork completed in February 2022, just before the Russian invasion of Ukraine.

Notable filming locations included a 1,200-year-old wooden church near Vyshhgorod, the Kyiv City Center, and various rural settings including a cow farm, horse ranch, and traditional villages.

=== Impact of Russian Invasion ===
Following the Russian invasion of Ukraine in February 2022, three Ukrainian actors from the film – Artem, Volodym and Misha – were reported missing. The film's lead actress Lizabeta was reportedly stuck in the city of Dnipro.

== Release ==
The film was released in over 350 theaters across India on 27 May 2022. It was one of the few Indian films to feature Ukraine as its primary setting.

=== Box office ===
The film collected ₹14,000,000 at the Indian box office in its opening weekend, competing with releases like Top Gun: Maverick, Anek, and Bhool Bhulaiyaa 2.
