= Chauhan (Mer clan) =

Clan of Mer people in India

- Clan in Gujarat
- Ethnicity: Mer Maher
- Location: Gujarat
- Varna
- Language: Gujarati; Hindi; English
- Religion: Hindu

Chauhan or Chouhan is a clan (gotra) mostly found in the Mer Hindu caste of Gujarat, India.
