= Chahamanas =

Chahamanas may refer to:

The ruling dynasties belonging to the Chahamana clan included:

- Chahamanas of Shakambhari (Chauhans of Ajmer) (c. 551 – 1194)
- Chahamanas of Naddula (Chauhans of Nadol) (c. 950 – 1197)
- Chahamanas of Jalor (c. 1160 – 1311), branched off from the Chahamanas of Naddula
- Chahamanas of Ranastambhapura (c. 1192 – 1301), branched off from the Chahamanas of Shakambhari
- Chahamanas of Chandravati and Abu (Kingdom of Sirohi) (c. 1311 – 1949)
- Chahamanas of Lata
- Chahamanas of Dholpur
- Chahamanas of Partabgarh
- Hada Chauhan kingdoms of Hadoti region are:
  - Kingdom of Bundi (c. 1342 – 1949)
  - Kingdom of Kota (c. 1579 – 1948)

== See also ==
- Chauhan (disambiguation)
