= Baghirua =

- Village
- Location in Uttar Pradesh, India Baghirua (India)
- Coordinates: 27.1426867°N 79.1153366999999°E
- Country: India
- State: Uttar Pradesh
- District: Mainpuri
- Tehsil: Bhongaon

Government
  - Body: Gram panchayat

Area
  - Total: 7.714 km^{2} (2.978 sq mi)

Population (2011)
  - Total: 2,748
  - Density: 356.2/km^{2} (922.6/sq mi)

Languages
  - Official: Hindi
- Time zone: UTC+5:30 (IST)
- PIN: 205120
- Vehicle registration: UP-84
- Nearest city: Mainpuri
- Lok Sabha constituency: Mainpuri
- Vidhan Sabha constituency: Kishni
- Website: up.gov.in

Baghirua (Baghirūā) is a large village located in Jagir block and Bhogaon Tehsil of Mainpuri district, Uttar Pradesh. As of 2011, it has a population of 2,748, in 437 households. It falls under Mainpuri Lok Sabha and Kishni Vidhan Sabha constituency.

== Demographics ==
As of 2011, Baghirua had a population of 2,748, in 437 households. This population was 54.7% male (1,503) and 45.3% female (1,245). The 0-6 age group numbered 381 (203 male and 178 female), or 13.9% of the total population. 114 residents were members of Scheduled Castes, or 4.1% of the total.

The 1981 census recorded Baghirua as having a population of 1,752 people, in 290 households.

The 1961 census recorded Baghirua as comprising 9 hamlets, with a total population of 1,396 people (737 male and 659 female), in 257 households and 185 physical houses. The area of the village was given as 1,732 acres.

=== Gender Ratio ===
There are 828 females per 1000 males in Baghirua, lower than the Uttar Pradesh state average of 912.

=== Average Literacy ===
Baghirua has a higher overall literacy rate of 80.35% compared to 67.68% of Uttar Pradesh. Male literacy stands at 89.77% and the female literacy rate is 68.88%.

== Administration ==
As per the Constitution of India and Panchyati Raj Act, Baghirua village is administrated by Sarpanch (Head of Village). Baghirua was one among the "Lohiya Gram" villages listed for development under Dr. Ram Manohar Lohiya Integrated Village Development Scheme taken up by Govt. of Uttar Pradesh.

== Infrastructure ==
As of 2011, Baghirua had 1 primary school and 1 veterinary hospital but no healthcare facilities for humans. Drinking water was provided by tap, well, and hand pump; there were no public toilets. The village had a post office and public library, as well as at least some access to electricity for all purposes. Streets were made of both kachcha and pakka materials.
