= Piplia Sisodia =

- village
- Location in Madhya Pradesh, India Piplia Sisodia (India)
- Coordinates: 23°46′47″N 75°26′35″E
- Country: India
- State: Madhya Pradesh

Languages
  - Official: Hindi
- Time zone: UTC+5:30 (IST)

Piplia Sisodia, or Pipliya Sisodiya, is a village in the Alot tehsil of Ratlam District of the Indian state of Madhya Pradesh. Before Indian independence, Piplia Sisodia was ruled by Rajputs of the Sisodia clan.
