= Chauhanpur =

Village in Uttar Pradesh, India

- Village
- Location in Uttar Pradesh, India
- Coordinates: 27.17252°N 79.14154°E
- Country: India
- State: Uttar Pradesh
- District: Mainpuri
- Tehsil: Bhongaon

Area
  - Total: 1.342 km^{2} (0.518 sq mi)

Population (2011)
  - Total: 853
  - Density: 636/km^{2} (1,650/sq mi)
- Time zone: UTC+5:30 (IST)

Chauhanpur (Chauhānpur) is a village in Jagir block of Mainpuri district, Uttar Pradesh, India. As of 2011, it had a total population of 853, in 144 households.

== Demographics ==
As of 2011, Chauhanpur had a population of 853, in 144 households. This population was 53.7% male (458) and 46.3% female (395). The 0-6 age group numbered 120 (64 male and 56 female), or 14.1% of the total population. 309 residents were members of Scheduled Castes, or 36.2% of the total.

The 1981 census recorded Chauhanpur as having a population of 388 people, in 67 households.

The 1961 census recorded Chauhanpur as comprising 1 hamlets, with a total population of 282 people (153 male and 129 female), in 55 households and 34 physical houses. The area of the village was given as 341 acres.

== Infrastructure ==
As of 2011, Chauhanpur had 1 primary school; it did not have any healthcare facilities. Drinking water was provided by hand pump and tube well; there were no public toilets. The village did not have a post office or public library; there was at least some access to electricity for all purposes. Streets were made of both kachcha and pakka materials.
