= 8th Light Cavalry =

Indian Army regiment

- Durga Das in action with the 8th Light Cavalry
- Active: 1787–Present
- Country: (British Raj) British India 1787–1947; India 1947-Present
- Branch: British Indian Army 1787–1947; Indian Army 1947–Present
- Type: Cavalry, Armoured Corps
- Size: Regiment
- Part of: Indian Cavalry Corps / Armoured Corps
- Equipment: T-90
- Decorations: Guidon presentation by President Fakhruddin Ali Ahmed (1976)
- Battle honours: Third Mysore War; Fourth Mysore War; Indian Mutiny; Second Burmese War; World War I: Givenchy 1914; France & Flanders 1914–16; Afghanistan 1919; Iraq –1920; World War II: Burma Campaign; Punjab 1965

Commanders
- Colonel of the Regiment: Lieutenant General Vivek Kashyap

Insignia
- Abbreviation: 8th Lt Cav

The 8th Light Cavalry traces its origins from the 8th King George's Own Light Cavalry which was formed in 1922 by the amalgamation of the 26th King George's Own Light Cavalry and the 30th Lancers following a re-organisation of the Indian Cavalry Corps. Both regiments were regular cavalry units that had had long and distinguished records in the British Indian Army prior to their amalgamation. During World War II the regiment was converted into an armoured car unit and served during the Burma campaign. After India gained Independence the regiment was named 8th Light Cavalry.The regiment is the third oldest armoured regiment in India and is amongst the most highly decorated regiments in the country.

== 26th King George's Own Light Cavalry ==
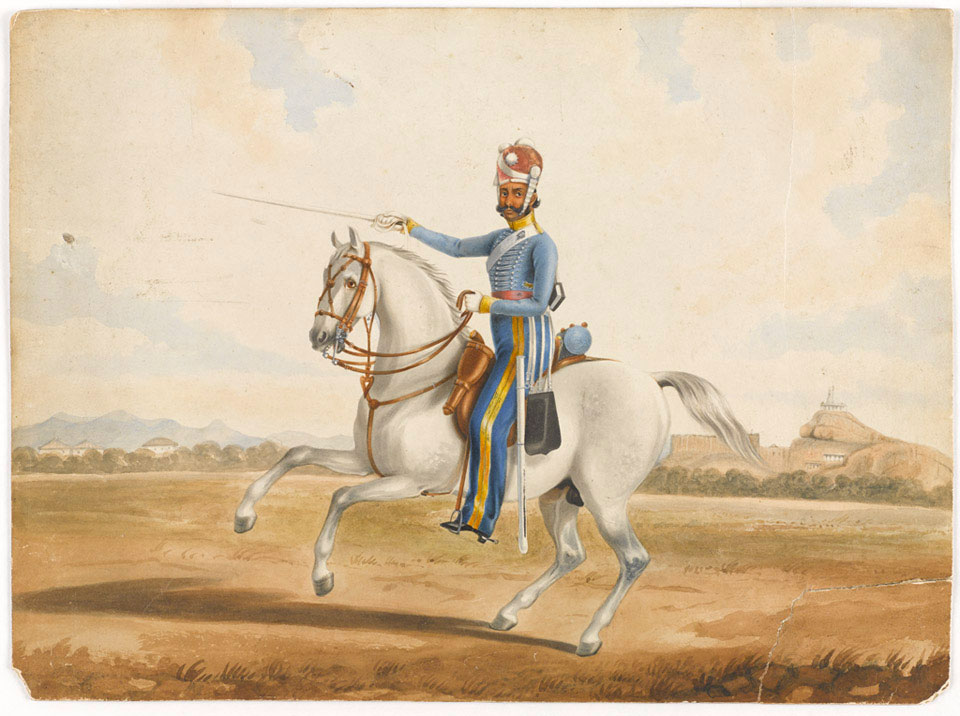
c. 1847 painting of a Madras Light Cavalry sowar

The 26th King George's Own Light Cavalry was originally raised as the 5th Regiment Madras Native Cavalry on 23 October 1787 as part of the Madras Presidency Army. In 1788, it was re-designated as the 1st Madras Native Cavalry and in 1816 its name was changed to 1 Madras Light Cavalry. The Regiment was yet again renamed as the 1st Regiment of Madras Lancers in 1886, and was known by that title till the turn of the century, when it was changed to 1st Madras Lancers.

In 1903 it was renamed as the 26th Light Cavalry and three years later it became the Prince of Wales Own Light Cavalry and then in 1910, it became the 26th King George's Own Light Cavalry. During this time it participated in the Third Mysore War, 1789–1792, the Fourth Mysore War, 1793–1798. Campaigns against Dhoondia Wagh and the Polygars, 1799–1830. Campaigns in Afghanistan and Burma, between, 1880–1914.

=== World War I ===
The 26th King George's Own Light Cavalry served in the South Yemen during World War I as part of the Aden Field Force.

== 30th Lancers (Gordon's Horse) ==
The year 1826 witnessed the birth of another illustrious regiment, the 4th Nizam's Cavalry, raised as part of the Hyderabad Cavalry. It later re-christened as the 30th Lancers and also came to be known as Gordon’s Horse after Sir John Gordon. This regiment participated in the Indian Mutiny, 1857–1859 and the Second Burmese War, 1860–1889. From the Second Burmese War to World War I, 1889–1914. Chap V - World War I to the Amalgamation, 1914–1922. Givenchy 1914; France and Flanders 1914–1916; Afghanistan 1919; Iraq 1920.

=== World War I ===
During the first world war the Regiment was part of the 3rd (Ambala) Cavalry Brigade, 1st Indian Cavalry Division they were brigaded with the 8th (King's Royal Irish) Hussars and the 9th Hodson's Horse They were sent to France for service on the Western Front where they at times would serve in the trenches as infantry due to the difference on troop levels each Cavalry Brigade once dismounted formed a dismounted regiment. The high number of officer casualties suffered early on had an effect on its later performance. British officers that understood the language, customs, and psychology of their men could not be quickly replaced, and the alien environment of the Western Front had some effect on the soldiers. The Regiment stayed in France as part of the 1st Indian Cavalry Division until March 1918 when the division was broken up and reformed in Egypt.

== Amalgamation ==
In 1922, the two regiments were amalgamated to form the 8th King George's Own Light Cavalry, inheriting in the process, the traditions and rich heritages of two cultures. After India attained independence, the regiment was renamed as the 8th Light Cavalry.

The 1st Regiment Madras Native Cavalry, in its infancy, saw action in Burma and Afghanistan, where it earned the Battle Honours AVA and AFGHANISTAN, indicative of its performance in both these theatres of war.

Then came the Great War and the 26th King George's Own Light Cavalry was moved to South Yemen as part of the Aden Field Force, where, keeping in the traditions of the regiment, it performed brilliantly.

During this war, 30th Lancers saw action in France where, though being a cavalry regiment, it received a good taste of trench warfare. It then went on to extinguish the embers of an Arab rebellion in Iraq, before going into action in Persia.

At this point, the regiment had won 12 battle honors. The King, who was already the colonel of one of the pre-existing regiments, was made the colonel-in-chief of the regiment, while Field Marshal Lord Chetwode was appointed as its first colonel in 1936.

It is Lord Chetwode's immortal shibboleth – “The safety, honour and welfare of your country come first, always and every time. The honour, welfare and comfort of the men you command come next. Our own ease, comfort and safety come last, always and every time”, which became the credo not only for the regiment, but for the entire officer corps of the Indian Army and is etched in main hall of the Indian Military Academy at Dehradun.

== World War II ==
World War II 1939-1945; Waziristan 1939-1943; Vizagapatam 1944; Burma 1945, 19th Indian Division, 1946.

In 1940, the Regiment bid farewell to the horses and began the long and arduous process of mechanisation. It was fully mechanised by 1943 on armoured cars. It executed its first mechanised operation in 1945 in Burma, where it earned 19 gallantry and distinguished service awards in this single operation

== Class Composition ==
The Regiment has a fixed class composition of Jats, Rajputs and Sikhs.

== Post Indian Independence ==
Post independence, the regiment had the privilege of participating in all major wars fought by the Indian Army – Hyderabad (1948), Jammu and Kashmir (1948), Goa (1961), China (Sikkim) (1962), Pakistan (Punjab) (1965) and Pakistan (Jammu and Kashmir) (1971).

The Regiment took part in Annexation of Hyderabad against the Razakars leading to the formal union of the princely state of Hyderabad with the Union of India. The operations in Hyderabad had just been over, when the regiment was moved to Jammu and Kashmir. During the Liberation of Goa in 1961, the regiment with its AMX-13 tanks spearheaded the attack which led the Portuguese to surrender.

The history of mechanized warfare was re-written by the regiment in 1962, when it drove its AMX-13 tanks to the dizzying heights of 14,000 feet up the Nathu La pass road in Sikkim – a feat never performed or attempted before anywhere in the world.

Khemkaran in Punjab witnessed the regiment in tank-versus-tank encounters with Pakistani forces during the Battle of Asal Uttar resulting in the battlefield becoming a “graveyard” for Pakistani Patton tanks. Here the regiment earned the Battle Honour PUNJAB.

The 1971 Indo-Pak war saw the regiment with their Vijayanta tanks among the Indian forces which had wrung the tactically fragile Chicken's Neck in the Akhnoor Sector.

The Regiment's crowning glory came in 1976, when in recognition of its services and valour, the regiment was presented the Guidon by the then President, Mr Fakhruddin Ali Ahmed.

== Regimental Insignia ==
The present Regimental insignia consists of crossed lances with pennons of Red over White, the numeral "8" inscribed on the crossing of the lances, topped by a mailed fist with the letter "AC" and a scroll at the base with the words "Light Cavalry" on it. The shoulder title consists of "8C" in brass.

== See also ==
- 8th Cavalry (Pakistan)

== Books ==
- Guest, Capt. Freddie (1959). Indian Cavalryman. London: Jarrolds Publisher. [A memoir of an officer who served in the 8th King George's Own Light Cavalry in the 1920s-1930s.]
- Rawlinson, H. G. (1948). The History of 8th King George V's Own Light Cavalry. Gale & Polden Ltd.
