= Priyo =

Priyo could refer to:

- Priyo.com, Bangladesh-based website
- Priyo Iswanto (born 1962), Indonesian diplomat
