= Chauhan (surname) =

Chauhan or Chohan is a surname of various Indian communities.

It is found among the Bhangi (Chuhra), Rajput, and Koli caste groups found in the Indian states of Himachal Pradesh, Punjab, Rajasthan, Jammu and Kashmir, Gujarat, Madhya Pradesh, Haryana, Uttar Pradesh, Uttarakhand, Jharkhand, Maharashtra and Bihar.

== Notable people ==
- Anil Chauhan
- Phagu Chauhan
- Dara Singh Chauhan
- Sanjay Singh Chauhan
- Anshul Chauhan
- Anuja Chauhan
- Ashok Chavan
- Bahadur Singh Chauhan
- Charlie Chauhan
- Chetan Chauhan
- Gajendra Chauhan
- Gogaji Chauhan
- Hammir Dev Chauhan, King of Ranthambore
- Jagjit Singh Chauhan
- Maneet Chauhan
- Mohit Chauhan
- Prabhu Chauhan
- Prithviraj Chauhan, King of Delhi
- Prithviraj Chavan
- Rajesh Chauhan
- Rajkumar Chauhan
- Ravi Chauhan
- Rohit Jugraj Chauhan
- Sanjay Chauhan (politician), mayor of Shimla Municipal Corporation
- Sanjay Singh Chauhan (born 1961), Gujjar leader
- Sanjay Chauhan (screenwriter) (born 1962), Indian screenwriter
- Sanjay Puran Singh Chauhan (born 1975), Indian film director and screenwriter
- Sahab Singh Chauhan (1950-2018), Indian politician
- Captain Sanjay Chauhan, Indian soldier
- Shivraj Singh Chauhan
- Sonal Chauhan
- Sonika Chauhan
- Subhadra Kumari Chauhan
- Sunidhi Chauhan
- Vikram Singh Chauhan
- Hemant Chauhan
- Ian Dev Singh Chauhan
- Aditi Chauhan
- Siddharth Chauhan
- Neha Chauhan
- Devesh Chauhan

== See also ==
- Chauhan (disambiguation) – includes a list of clans
