= Sisodia (surname) =

Sisodia is a Gujarati and Kannada surname of Indian origin. It is mostly found in Salvi and Bail Kammara Hindu caste groups.

== Notable people ==
Notable people who carry the surname include:

- Mahendra Singh Sisodia, Indian politician
- Luvnith Sisodia, Indian cricketer
- Manish Sisodia, Indian politician
- Chunda Sisodia, Indian monarch

== See also ==
- Sisodia dynasty
