= Kedar Pandit =

Indian tabla player (born 1967)

- Origin: Pune, India
- Genres: Indian classical music, Hindustani classical music
- Occupation: musician
- Instrument: Tabla
- Website: kedarpandit.in

Kedar Pandit is an Indian tabla player, music composer in Hindustani classical music genre and music arranger.

== Early life and background ==
Pandit was born in a Marathi family to Prabhakar Pandit and Anuradha Pandit, both acclaimed violinists.

== Career ==
Pandit accompanied Pandit Jasraj on tabla for all of Jasraj's concerts, and accompanies vocalists Kaushiki Chakrabarty and Sanjeev Abhyankar. Over the years, he moved to music composing and arranging, working with leading artists. In 2015 he worked with the actress Ketaki Mategaonkar, composing the music for her album.

He has directed over 650 albums, composed over 2,500 songs, and performed in over 2,000 live concerts.

== Discography ==
- Agnihotra shantipath vedic chants for universal peace and well-being, Times Music, Mumbai, 2002 OCLC 801782645
- Gāyatrī ārādhānā celebrate the power of Gavatri, Times Music, Mumbai, 2002 OCLC 801782862
- Satyanarayan katha : in a complete musical rendition-- first time ever!, Times Music, Mumbai, 2001 OCLC 51495660
- Ganesh mantra, Times Music, Mumbai, 2001 OCLC 311143880
- Immortal songs of Indian cinema : an instrumental tribute, Virgin Music, Mumbai, 2010 OCLC 686860216
- Ekā Janārdanī : Santa Ekanātha Mahārājāñce abhaṅga, Fountain Music, Pune, 2006 OCLC 164467270
- Nāmā mhaṇe : Santa Namadevāñyā abhaṅgaracanā, Fountain Music, Pune, 2006 OCLC 164467247
- Tukā mhaṇe : Santa Tukārāmāñcyā abhaṅgaracanā, Fountain Music, Pune, 2006 OCLC 164467221
- Samartha vāṇī : Santa Rāmadāsasvāmīñyā abhaṅgaracanā, Fountain Music, Pune, 2006 OCLC 164467235
- Jñānadeva mhaṇe : Santa Jñāneśvarāñcyā abhaṅgaracanā, Fountain Music, Pune, 2006 OCLC 164467259

== Awards and recognition ==
- Mewati Gharana Purasakaar
- Asthapailu Sangeetkaar - award for all-round excellence in music direction.
