= Keshav Kumar =

Indian cricketer (born 1988)

Personal information
- Born: 13 December 1988 (age 37); Nalanda, Bihar
- Batting: Right-handed
- Bowling: Right-arm off-break
- Role: Batsman

Domestic team information
- Years: Team
- 2005/06-2013/14: Jharkhand
- 2003/04, 2018/19–2019/20: Bihar
- First-class debut: 29 November 2008 Jharkhand v Himachal Pradesh
- Last First-class: 22 December 2018 Bihar v Nagaland
- Last List A: 30 September 2019 Bihar v Madhya Pradesh

Career statistics
Competition	First-class	List A	T20
Matches	11	34	28
Runs scored	287	445	400
Batting average	17.93	20.22	25.00
100s/50s	0/0	0/2	0/2
Top score	38	76*	61*
Balls bowled	366	1046	317
Wickets	3	29	9
Bowling average	79.66	25.58	41.77
5 wickets in innings	0	1	0
10 wickets in match	0	0	0
Best bowling	1/18	5/23	2/16
Catches/stumpings	3/–	10/–	10/–
- Source: ESPNcricinfo, 17 April 2026

Keshav Kumar (born 13 December 1988) is an Indian cricketer. He made his first-class debut for Jharkhand against Himachal Pradesh in the 2008–09 Ranji Trophy on 29 November 2008.

Ahead of the 2018–19 Ranji Trophy, he transferred from Jharkhand to Bihar. He was the leading wicket-taker for Bihar in the 2018–19 Vijay Hazare Trophy tournament, with fifteen dismissals in eight matches.
