= Kingdom of Kalpi =

Kingdom in North India (1390–1444)

- 1390–1444
- Status: Independent (1390–1414); Vassal of the Malwa Sultanate (after 1414)
- Capital: Muhamadabad
- Official languages: Persian
- Religion: Islam
- Government: Monarchy
  - 1400–1411: Nasiruddin Mahmud
  - 1411–1432: Qadir Shah
  - 1432–1442: Jalal Khan
  - 1442–1444: Nasir Khan
- Historical era: Middle Ages
  - Firuz Shah Tughlaq establishes Shiq Firuzpur: 1378
  - Foundation of Muhammadabad: 1390
  - Independence from the Delhi Sultanate: 1400
  - Kalpi War: 1413–1444
  - Malwa–Jaunpur treaty: 1444
Preceded by	Succeeded by
Delhi Sultanate	Malwa Sultanate
- Today part of: India

The Kingdom of Kalpi was a late medieval Indian Muslim state which comprised the modern districts of Jalaun, Kanpur and other neighbouring areas in Uttar Pradesh between 1410 and 1444. In 1378, Malikzada Firuz was granted the shiqq of Firuzpur by Sultan Firuz Shah Tughluq. His eldest son, Mahmud, who held the shiqq of Firuzpur, founded the city of Muhammadabad in AD 1390 on the site of Kalpi and made it his capital. After Timur's invasion, Mahmud asserted independence. He expanded his territory by subjugating neighbouring regions, conducted successful expeditions against local chiefs, and significantly weakened the power of several Rajput rulers. The dynasty established by Mahmud lasted for about half a century. During this period, Kalpi developed into an important cultural centre. Refugees fleeing Delhi found shelter there and greatly enriched the city's cultural and intellectual life. It faced several external invasions from the Sharqi sultans of Jaunpur. The small independent state lost its sovereignty to Malwa Sultanate in 1444 AD. The Malikzada family vanishes from the historical records after that. The region of Kalpi was later annexed by the Bahlul Khan Lodi during Ghiyath Shah's reign.

== Iqta of Delhi ==
=== Establishment of Shiq Firuzpur ===
In 1377–78 AD (779 AH), Sultan Firoz Shah Tughluq led a second expedition against the rebellious muqaddams Rai Sumer and Adharan of Etawah. During this campaign, the Sultan encamped on the bank of the Yamuna opposite the village of Kanawran modern Kanar Khera, (Note: Located at 26°25′N 79°16′E) where he constructed a new fort named Firuzpur after himself. Upon its completion, he assigned the fort and the newly created Shiq Firuzpur to Malikzada Firuz bin Tajuddin bin Turk. At the same time, he placed the older fort of Kanar under Malik Hasan Makkan. He further strengthened Malikzada Firuz's position by adding Tughluqpur with its dependencies and the Iqtas of Erich, Chanderi, Shahpur, and Rapri (Note: Located in present day Manipuri district at 26°58′N 78°36′E) to the shiqq. The Sultan honoured Malikzada Firuz with a robe of honour and royal favours and recruited the descendants of the late Malik Muhammad Shah Afghan into the entourage of Firozpur. Forts were also founded at Akhal (Tughlaqpur fort) and Patlahi, where Malikzada Firuz was stationed with a large force and prominent amirs to secure the region. After completing these military and administrative arrangements, the Sultan returned to Delhi. Malikzada Firuz appointed his elder son, Mahmud Khan, as the commander of the forces and Ariz (military administrator) of the shiqq of Firuzpur. From there he also laid unsuccessful siege on the fort of Gagron.

=== Rajput invasion ===
Sultan Tughluq Khan largely neglected state affairs and indulged in pleasures and luxury. The administration was effectively managed by Malikzada Firuz. In the early part of Tughluq Khan's reign, the Rajputs near shiq of Firuzpur revolted. Malikzada Mahmud who was stationed in the shiq of Firuzpur, were defeated by a coalition of Rajput chiefs. Following the defeat, Rajput leaders Udharan and Sumer raised the standard of revolt in the regions of Etawah and Akhal (Tughluqpur). They assembled a large force near the village of Masalpur. Malikzada Mahmud marched against them, sacked Masalpur. However, on his return, his forces were pursued and decisively defeated by the Rajput army. Several nobles were killed in the battle. Mahmud retreated with the rests to the town of Munj (Note: Located at 26°55′N 70°11′E) in Tahsil Etawah. At Munj, Mahmud was reinforced by his younger brother, Junaid Khan, who arrived from Delhi accompanied by other nobles. Despite this, the Delhi forces could not recover. The Rajput chiefs further captured several key towns and territories, including Chandwar, Bhongaon, Phaphund, Bairichh, Mahoni, and Ratwa. Malikzada Mahmud placed his brother Nizam Khan in charge of the fort of Akhal and stationed Malik Hasan Makkan nearby. As Rajput pressure intensified, Mahmud shifted his base to Shahpur, where he was later joined by Malik Hasan. Eventually, Nizam Khan surrendered the fort of Akhal peacefully and joined his elder brother at Shahpur.

=== Establishment of Muhammadabad ===
Malikzada Mahmud moved from Shahpur to the banks of the Yamuna and then to Kalpi. He fortified it and built large palace-fortress inside. In 1390 AD, he renamed the town Muhammadabad after the Prophet of Islam Muhammad, replaced the temples with mosques, and made it his capital.

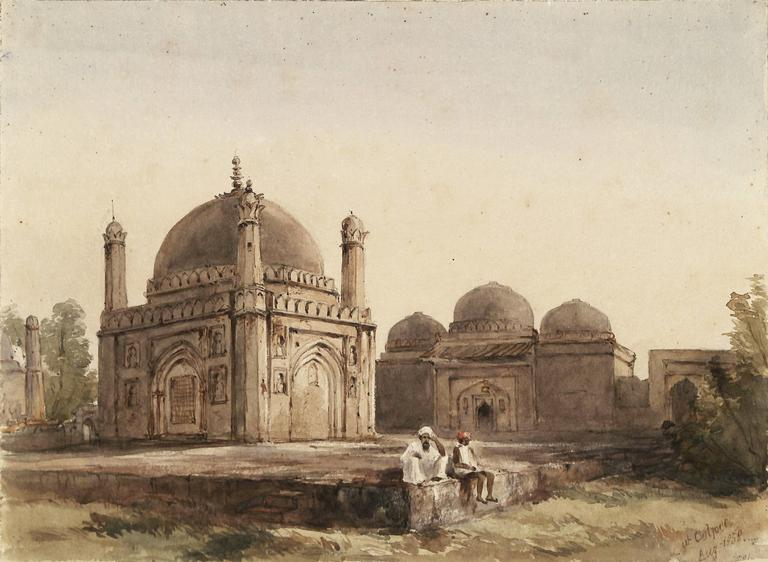
Mosque buildings in Kalpi by James Maurice Primrose c. August 1858

After Nasiruddin Muhammad Shah became the Sultan he launched campaign against the Rajput chiefs Udharan and Sumer. In 1391, The Sultan marched rapidly towards Etawah and laid siege. During the siege, Mahmud Khan ruler of Muhammadabad, arrived with a large contingent from Kalpi to support the Sultan. Pleased with his timely assistance, Muhammad Shah honoured Mahmud Khan with high favours and elevated his status above other maliks. The royal army successfully captured the fort of Etawah. In recognition of his services, Mahmud Khan was granted the iqta of Mahoba and awarded robes of honour and rich gifts. All territories previously belonging to the shiq of Firuzpur were transferred to the control of Kalpi and placed under his authority. After bestowing further honours, the Sultan permitted Mahmud Khan to return to Kalpi, while he himself returned to Delhi.

== Independence ==
In 1400 AD, shortly after Timur's invasion of India, Mahmud declared independence assuming the name Sultan Nasiruddin Mahmud Shah. He appointed his brother Junaid Khan as wazir. The last Tughlaq ruler, Mahmud Shah (r. 1394–1413), recognized him as Sultan. He subdued the Rajput insurgents of Khandaut. There he established a new town Mahmudabad with a strong fort and palace after himself. Sultan Mahmud Khan launched a series of successful campaigns against Rajput chiefs in the region. Next, he invaded Hamirpur, (Note: Located at 25°58′N 80°9′E) forcing its submission. He then sacked Samoni and Mathura, and conquered Ghora and Gwalior, defeating ruler Bairam Deo. When Bhilam of Kandal and Bairam of Ghora rebelled and plundered near Mahoba, Mahmud swiftly marched, defeated the combined rebel forces at Kandal, and built a major fort at Mahoba under Muzaffar Khan. Several local chiefs submitted and agreed to pay tribute. Later, upon learning of Bairam’s plan to attack Kara, the Sultan launched a pre-emptive strike on Ghora, routed his army, plundered and destroyed the settlement, forcing Bairam to flee with heavy losses. He then launched campaign towards Prayag and Arail, (Note: Village opposite to Allahabad Fort) devastating the cities and securing Kara. When Sulaiman bin Daud Chap rebelled and attacked Nizam Khan, the Sultan marched to Erich and besieged the fort, reinforced by Malwa Sultan Dilawar Khan. A large Rajput force led by Rai Sumer was defeated on the Betwa River. This victory fostered friendly relations with the Malwa Sultanate. In a separate campaign against the Chauhans of Etawah, he plundered Kanar, Phaphund, Andawah, Karhal, and Jakhan, but failed to capture Etawah fort. He subjugated Kamit (in Chambal region) and Hathkant (village in Bah), destroyed the great fort of Udairaj, and ravaged areas near Gwalior until the local Rai submitted. The Sultan then pardoned him and returned to Kalpi. Nasiruddin Mahmud died in 1411. His son Qadir Khan succeeded his father assuming the title Ikhtiyar-ud-dunya-waddin Qadir Shah.

== Wars over Kalpi ==
In April 1413, Sultan Ibrahim Shah of Jaunpur besieged Muhammadabad. After several days of fighting and losing valuable elephants, he failed to capture the city and withdrew. In 1414, Ibrahim returned with a large army, captured Mahoba, Rath, Shahpur, Erich, and Bhander. After heavy pressure and casualties on Qadir Shah's side, Kalpi accepted Jaunpur suzerainty. Ibrahim then returned to Jaunpur. To counter Jaunpur influence, Qadir Shah formed an alliance with Hoshang Shah of Malwa by marrying his sister in around 1413-1414. Malwa treated Kalpi as a friendly vassal state. Qadir Shah broke allegiance with Jaunpur, recaptured Mahoba and Rath, and after a siege of over two years, seized the fort of Erich. In 1427, Ibrahim Sharqi again attacked Kalpi. This time Qadir Shah called for help from Delhi Sultan Mubarak Shah. Delhi forces clashed with Jaunpur troops near Etawah and Mali Kotah. After fierce battles and heavy losses on both sides the armies withdrew in March 1428. Ibrahim returned to Jaunpur and Mubarak Shah to Delhi.

After Qadir Shah's death in 1432, nobles installed his second son Jalal Khan, who was a maternal nephew of Hoshang Shah, on the throne with the support of wazir Mubarak Khan and Nizam Khan. Meanwhile, Qadir Shah's elder son Nasir Khan sought help from Jaunpur. Sultan Ibrahim Sharqi sheltered Nasir Khan and invaded Kalpi. Jalal Khan proved weak and unpopular, leading to his imprisonment and exile to Malwa. Nobles then briefly raised Firuz Khan, a younger son of Qadir Shah, as ruler. In 1433–34, Ibrahim and Nasir Khan besieged Muhammadabad. Hoshang Shah of Malwa intervened with an army, forcing Ibrahim to withdraw. Hoshang reinstated Jalal Khan. However, Jalal's continued misrule caused more unrest. Nizam Khan, along with his son Umar Khan, was executed, and wazir Mubarak Khan fled the capital and settled in Erich. As nobles defected to Jaunpur, Ibrahim returned, besieged the capital again. With Mubarak Khan and other nobles switching sides, Muhammadabad fell to the Sharqis. Nasir Khan was installed as ruler but soon abdicated in favor of Jalal Khan. Ibrahim reconciled with Jalal and accepted his authority over Kalpi.

== Decline ==
After the death of Qadir Shah, the Kalpi Sultanate suffered severe instability and fragmentation. Wazir Mubarak Khan bin Junaid Khan relocated from Muhammadabad to Erich in 1435 (839 AH) and established firm independent authority over the district. He consolidated power by recruiting soldiers, reorganizing administration, expelling seditious elements, and fortifying the citadel. His court at Erich served as an asylum for many displaced maliks and nobles amid the regional anarchy. Soon after, Mubarak Khan pledged allegiance to Sultan Ibrahim Shah of Jaunpur, accepted his envoy, and ordered coins minted and the khutba read in the Sharqi ruler's name, openly defying Kalpi's central authority. He further strengthened his position by campaigning against local rebels. He plundered Ataura, subduing the chiefs of Kundal and Prahar, and later razing the fort of Kundal after a second rebellion. When the chief of Gwalior occupied areas near Bhander, Mubarak Khan successfully defended his territory and forced a peaceful settlement. Isma'il Khan bin Nizam Khan had also declared independence in Jathra, assuming the title of Shams-ad Duniya wa ad-din Isma'il Khan, while Nasir Khan held Rath and Mahoba.

In 1442, Nasir Khan became ruler after Jalal Khan's death. He assumed the name Nasir Shah. Accusations were spread against him of apostasy, destroying mosques, and oppressing Muslims. Jaunpur used these charges as a pretext invaded Kalpi. Mahmud Shah of Jaunpur invaded and occupied Kalpi. Nasir fled to Chanderi. Mahmud Khalji marched to support him, leading to direct confrontations near Erich, Bhander, and Kalpi. Malwa forces won several skirmishes and plundered areas. By 1444, both sides were exhausted and accepted peace. Nasir Khan was restored Muhammadabad. Mahmud Sharqi promised to never interfere in Kalpi again. Mahmud Khalji returned to Mandu, Mahmud Sharqi to Jaunpur. During this war, Mubarak Khan bin Junaid Khan had sided with Mahmud Sharqi, however he was accused by the locals of Erich to be oppressive, and was deposed and imprisoned by Mahmud Sharqi in 1445. Isma'il Khan had accepted the suzerainty of Mahmud Khalji of Malwa.

Nasir Khan completely became dependent of Malwa. After the death of Mahmud Khalji, his successor Ghiyath Shah adopted pacifist policy. In 1484, Bahlul Lodi captured the territories of Bayana, Hindoun and Kalpi. He conferred Kalpi on his grandson A'zam Humayun.

The malikzada family faded into obscurity after 1444. Two inscription record that Firuz Shah bin Qadir Shah's descendant, Alam Shah, had later settled at Chanderi, while Alam Shah's son Bahadur Shah constructed a well at Bari during the reign of Mughal emperor Aurangzeb.

== Religion ==
After Timur's invasion in 1398, many sufis and ulama had migrated to Kalpi. Nasiruddin Mahmud developed Kalpi as a centre of culture like Delhi. He and his successors continued patronage to religious scholars and saints in the kingdom. The early sufis of Kalpi belonged to the Chishti and Suhrawardiyya silsilas followed by Zahidiyya and Madariyya. Prominent sufis were Sheikh Ahmad Thanesari, Sheikh 'Ala al-Din Quraishi and Sheikh Abu al-Fath 'Ala'i of Gwalior. Sultan Mahmud's younger brother Ahmad Khan was Ahmad Thanesari's murid and also constructed a dome over his grave inside the fort. Sheikh Abu al-Fath 'Ala'i preached sufism. He died in 1450 AD. The important Suhrawardi saints in Kalpi include Sheikh Siraj Sukhta. For his deep learning, like Qadi Shihab al-Din Daulatabadi, he was also counted among the most distinguished pupils of Maulana Nahvi. His murids included several important nobles of Kalpi and even Sultan Qadir Shah. The other important Suhrawardi saint in Kalpi was Sheikh Yusuf Buda Erachhi. He is credited with having written a number of books. His translation of Al-Ghazali's Minhaj al-‘Abidin in the form of a mathnawi consisting of two thousand five hundred and twenty verses and named the Futuhat-i Ahmad was as popular as his diwan. Like the Chishti sufis, he was also fond of listening to sama' (qawwali). In 1430 A.D. he attended a sama‘ party in which he passed into an ecstatic state. After remaining in this state of mystic intoxication for several days he died at Erich. Mahmud Shah Khalji of Malwa had a mausoleum constructed over his grave. Another Suhrawardi sufi of distinction was Shaykh 'Abd al-Hakim, popularly known as Gushanashin. He died at Kalpi in 1574. During the reign of Sultan Qadir Shah, Shaykh Baha' al-Din Ganji Rawan introduced the Zahidi silsila in Kalpi. He refused all gifts from the Sultan and nobles despite their offerings of cash, land, and orchards. Known as Ganji Rawan ("ever-flowing treasure") for freely feeding visitors at his khanqah. His spiritual reputation helped sustain the silsila after him. Shaykh Badi' al-Din, popularly known as Shah Madar, founded the Madariyya silsila in India. A Syrian sufi of Jewish descent, he converted to Islam and became a disciple of SheikhTaifur Shami. He mastered Ibn al-A'rabi's Wahdat al-Wujud philosophy along with Jewish mysticism and Christian mysticism. He came to Kalpi during the reign of Qadir Shah and is highly regarded for his piety, eloquence, and miracles.

== Family tree ==
"Malikzada family"

Rulers of Kalpi
Malikzada ruler of Erich
Malikzada ruler of Jathra

Malik Tajuddin Turk
Malikzada Firuz (d. 1389)
Mahmud Khan (r. 1400–1410)	Junaid Khan	Nizam Khan	Ahmad Khan	Muzaffar Khan
Daulat Khan	Mubarak Khan (r. 1435–1445)	Yakub Khan	Umar Khan	Isma'il Khan (r. 1435–?)
Qadir Khan (r. 1411–1432)	Muhammad Khan	Wajih Khan	Hamid Khan	Muqtadir Khan	Fath Khan	Nimatullah Khan	Shadi Khan	Habibullah Khan	Mubarak Khan	Jalal Khan	Nusrat Khan
Nasir Khan (r. 1442–1444)	Jalal Khan (r. 1432–1444)	Firuz Khan (r. 1432)

== See also ==
- Chandelas of Jejakabhukti
- Kingdom of Kampili
- Kherla kingdom

== Bibliography ==
- Khani, Muhammad Bihamad (1952). Tarikh-I-Muhammadi (PDF). Translated by Zaki, Muhammad. Aligarh: Asia Publishing House.
- Day, Upendra Nath (1965). Medieval Malwa: A Political and Cultural History, 1401-1562. Munshi Ram Manohar Lal. ISBN 978-81-215-0401-0.
- Hussain, Syed Ejaz (2025-10-27). Shiraz-I Hind: A History of Jaunpur Sultanate. BRILL. ISBN 978-90-04-75387-7.
- Saeed, Mian Muhammad (1972). The Sharqi Sultanate of Jaunpur: A Political & Cultural History. University of Karachi.
- Habib, Mohammad; Nizami, Khaliq Ahmad (1970). A Comprehensive History of India. Vol. 5, Part 2. People's Publishing House.
- Siddiqui, Iqtidar Hussain (January–June 1984). "SUFIS AND SUFISM IN THE TERRITORY OF KALPI 15th and 16th Centuries" (PDF). Pakistan Journal of History and Culture. 5 (1): 64–69 – via NIHCR.
- Halim, Abdul (1961). History of the Lodi Sultans of Delhi and Agra. University of Dacca. Archived from the original on 2017-01-16.
- Haig, W. (1928). The Cambridge History of India: Turks and Afghans, edited by W. Haig. Vol. III. Cambridge University Press.
