= Nasiruddin Mahmud of Kalpi =

Sultan of Kalpi from 1400 to 1411

Nasiruddin Mahmud
- Sultan; Malikzada

Sultan of Kalpi
- Reign: 1400–1411
- Coronation: 1400
- Predecessor: Position established (Malikzada Firuz as Wali of Shiq Firuzpur)
- Successor: Qadir Khan
- Wazir: Junaid Khan
- Died: c. 1411; Kalpi; Kingdom of Kalpi
- Burial: c. 1411; Kalpi (now in Uttar Pradesh, India)
- Spouse: A daughter of Khattab Khan
- Issue: Qadir Khan; Muhammad Khan; Wajih Khan; Hamid Khan; Muqtadir Khan; Fath Khan; Nimatullah Khan; Shadi Khan; Habibullah Khan; Mubarak Khan; Jalal Khan; Nusrat Khan
Names
- Mahmud Khan bin Firuz Khan
Regnal name
- Sultan Nasiruddin Mahmud Shah
- Father: Malikzada Firuz
- Religion: Islam

Nasiruddin Mahmud Shah (Persian: نصیرالدین محمود شاه) born Mahmud Khan, was the founder and first sovereign of the independent Kingdom of Kalpi, ruling from 1400 until his death in 1411. Emerging from the lineage of Malik Tajuddin Turk, he established a powerful regional state cantered at his newly founded capital, Muhammadabad (modern-day Kalpi). His reign was characterized by extensive military expansion against regional Rajput rulers. He was succeeded by his son, Qadir Khan later to be known Ikhtiyar-ud-din Qadir Shah.

== Early career ==
Mahmud Khan was born to a noble family. His father Malikzada Firuz was the son of Malik Taj al-Din Turk who served as the Naib of Gujarat under Qutbuddin Mubarak Shah (r. 1316–1320) and Ghiyath al-Din Tughluq (r. 1320–1325). Malikzada Firuz served as the first Wali of Shiq Firuzpur and later the wazir under Tughlaq Khan (r. 1388–1389). Mahmud was appointment military administrator and later succeeded his father in Shiq Firuzpur.

During Sultan Tughluq Khan's reign, a Rajput coalition led by Rai Udharan and Sumer raised the standards of revolts against the Delhi Sultanate. They defeated Malikzada Mahmud. He was pursued to Munj, losing key towns like Chandwar, Bhongaon, Phaphund, Bairichh, Mahoni, and Ratwa to the rebels. Following his brother Nizam Khan's surrender of Akhal fort (Tughlaqpur), Mahmud retreated to Kalpi. In 1390 he established Muhammadabad on the site of Kalpi. In 1391, Nasiruddin Muhammad (r. 1390–1394) laid siege of Etawah. Mahmud joined in a combined force to crush the Rajput resistance and solidify control over the region. For his help, Sultan Nasiruddin Mahmud granted to iqta of Mahoba and other previously lost territories to Malikzada Mahmud.

== Reign ==
Shortly after Timur's invasion of India, Mahmud declared independence assuming the name Sultan Nasiruddin Mahmud Shah. He appointed his brother Junaid Khan as wazir. The last Tughlaq ruler, Mahmud Shah (r. 1394–1413), recognized him as Sultan. He launched campaigns against the Rajput insurgents of Khandaut, subdued them, and established a new town Mahmudabad after himself. He also built a strong fort and palace there.

He then devastated Hamirpur, (Note: Located at 25°58′N 80°9′E) forcing Bhuraj, its Muqaddam, to surrender and accepted suzerainty. Sacking the Hindu cities of Samoni and Mathura lastly he subdued Ghora, and its ruler Biramdeo Baghela. Next he invaded Gwalior defeating its ruler Bairam Deo in battle. Bairam fled to the fort. Several prominent chiefs who had come to support him were captured by the Sultan's forces. After securing victory the Sultan returned to his capital, Muhammadabad, where his triumph was celebrated throughout the city and the surrounding region.

=== War with Rajputs ===
After some time, Bhilam, the Muqaddam of Kandal formed an alliance with Bairam, the Muqaddam of Ghora and rebelled against the Sultan. They gathered their forces camping near the fort of Mahoba, and plundered the surrounding areas. When the Sultan received news of this rebellion, he immediately marched with his army and reached Mahoba. On learning of the Sultan's arrival, Bhilam and Bairam abandoned their position and fled to the fortified settlement of Kandal. The Sultan advanced from Mahoba to Kandal, defeated the rebels in battle, and left nearly a thousand of their cavalry and infantry dead. Sultan Mahmud returned to Mahoba with substantial booty ordered the construction of a large fort. The fort was placed under the command of Muzaffar Khan. He then returned to his capital. Bhilam of Kandal and Kalyan of Samoni, submitted to the Sultan, accepted his authority, and agreed to pay tribute. Sultan's forces also brought Kundli, Mathura, Rajance (Khizrabad), Kalinjar, and Jetur under control. Upon learning that Bairam had mobilized a large force to attack Kara, the Sultan and his wazir, Azam Humayun Junaid Khan, launched a swift pre-emptive strike on Ghora. The Sultan's army routed Bairam's forces, plundered the settlement, and destroyed his grand buildings, causing the renowned rebel leader to flee the battlefield with heavy losses.

The Sultan launched a military campaign toward Payag and Arail, (Note: Village opposite to Allahabad Fort) destroying both cities and securing the district of Kara from rebel interference. Meanwhile, Sulaiman bin Daud Chap rebelled by adopting royal insignias and launching a night assault against imperial commander Nizam Khan at Kandal. The Sultan responded by marching to Erich and besieging the fort, where he was reinforced by Malik Dilawar Khan of the Malwa Sultanate. To aid the besieged Sulaiman, the Rajput leader Rai Sumer mobilized an army of local chiefs and encamped on the banks of the Betwa River. The Sultan's forces advanced and decisively defeated the Hindu coalition on the battlefield. Following the rout, the victorious army constructed a tower of severed heads near Erich and seized extensive booty, including horses and captives. Sulaiman bin Daud begged for mercy. The Sultan pardoned him and restored his authority. From this time onward, friendly relations were established between the rulers of Kalpi and the Ghurid rulers of Malwa.

=== Campaigns against the Chauhans ===
Sultan Nasiruddin Mahmud launched a campaign against the Chauhans of Etawah, plundering the strongholds of Kanar, (Note: Located in Jalaun district) Phaphund, Andawah, (Note: Located in Auraiya district) Karhal, and Jakhan. He then besieged the impregnable fort of Etawah, but failed to capture it. The army subsequently routed the rebellious regions of Kamit (in Chambal region) and Hathkant (village in Bah), and completely destroyed the great fort of Udairaj. Advancing toward Gwalior, the Sultan's forces devastated the surrounding areas until the local Rai submitted to sue for peace. The Sultan granted a pardon and returned to his capital.

=== Rebellions ===
After Hasan Khan bin Makkan's death his son rebelled in Shahpur. The Sultan's forces, led by Malik Durraj occupied the fort before marching to confront the Rai Sumer. After defeating Sumer and forcing his retreat to Etawah, the Sultan besieged the fort, but the campaign was halted by monsoon rains, forcing the Sultan to retreat to Kanar to prepare for a future assault.

== Administration ==
Following the annexation of the iqta of Erich, the territory was transferred to the Wazir, Junaid Khan. After securing the fort of Erich and stabilizing the kingdom, Sultan Nasiruddin Mahmud Shah distributed the remaining major iqtas and wilayats among his key nobles and brothers: He granted the iqta of Jathra to his brother, Nizam Khan, while Bhander was assigned to Mukarram Khan bin Malik Daulatnak. The iqta of Mahoba was conferred upon Zain Khan bin Malik Nizamuddin, and Hasan Khan bin Makkhan was confirmed in his former tenure over Shahpur. Additionally, the town of Rath was awarded to Malik Ibrahim Razi, and Mahmudabad, formerly known as Khandaut, was granted to Malik Fakhr Khurram. The kingdom's territory comprised the modern districts of Jalaun, Kanpur, and some neighbouring areas in Uttar Pradesh. Its became buffer zone between the Malwa Sultanate and the Jaunpur Sultanate, also very close to Delhi Sultanate. Kalpi attracted numerous refugees after the sack of Delhi.

== Death ==
Sultan Nasiruddin Mahmud Shah died in 1411 AD. His brother, the wazir Junaid Khan, along with other brothers and sons, transported his body to the capital, Muhammadabad. He was buried directly beneath his mother's grave. He was succeeded by his son Qadir Khan.

== Family ==
Mahmud was married to a daughter of Khattab Khan. Four of his brothers, namely Junaid Khan, Nizam Khan, Ahmad Khan, Muzaffar Khan held prominent positions in Kalpi throughout his reign.

Muhammad Bihamdi Khani recorded the names of twelve sons of Nasiruddin Mahmud:

- Qadir Khan, who succeeded his father as Ikhtiyar-ud Din Qadir Shah of Kalpi, and ruled till his death in 1432.
- Muhammad Khan. He had revolted against Qadir Shah immediately after his ascension, but was forgiven and granted the iqta of khitta-i-Bhander. However, he rebelled again but was defeated, after which he was imprisoned, dying soon after.
- Wajih Khan, the Sar Siladar.
- Hamid Khan, the Akhur Beg, master of the horse.
- Muqtadir Khan, the Barbak, overseer of the royal court.
- Fath Khan, he held the niabat during Qadir Shah's reign. He held the position of governor of the capital Muhammadabad during Ibrahim Shah's first invasion of Kalpi.
- Nimatullah Khan,
- Shadi Khan,
- Habibullah Khan,
- Mubarak Khan,
- Jalal Khan,
- Nusrat Khan.

== Bibliography ==
- Khani, Muhammad Bihamad (1952). Tarikh-I-Muhammadi (PDF). Translated by Zaki, Muhammad. Aligarh: Asia Publishing House.
- Day, Upendra Nath (1965). Medieval Malwa: A Political and Cultural History, 1401-1562. Munshi Ram Manohar Lal. ISBN 978-81-215-0401-0.
- Hussain, Syed Ejaz (27 October 2025). Shiraz-I Hind: A History of Jaunpur Sultanate. BRILL. ISBN 978-90-04-75387-7.
- Jackson, Peter (1 April 1999). The Delhi Sultanate: A Political and Military History. Cambridge University Press. ISBN 978-0-521-40477-8.
