= Kalpi War =

1413–1444 conflicts in Kalpi

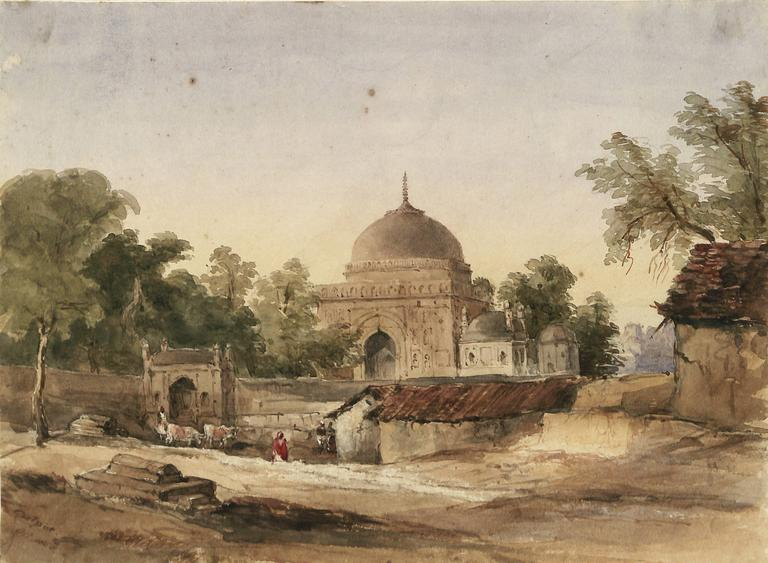
- Mosque in Kalpi by James Maurice Primrose c. October 1858
Date	1413–1444
Location	Kingdom of Kalpi
Result	Malwa–Kalpi victory
Territorial changes	See § Treaty

Belligerents
Kingdom of Kalpi; Supported by: Delhi Sultanate	Jaunpur Sultanate	Malwa Sultanate

Commanders and leaders
Qadir Shah; Jalal Khan (Note: Supported by Malwa Sultanate); Nasir Khan (Note: Supported by Jaunpur Sultanate); Firuz Khan; Bihamad Khan; Mubarak Khan; Nizam Khan X Mubarak Shah Commanders: Mahmud Hasan; Fath Khan; Zirak Khan; Islam Khan; Malik Chaman; Malik Kalu; Malik Ahmad Tufah; Maqbul Khani	Ibrahim Shah; Mahmud Shah Commanders: Malik-ush-Sharq Maqbul; Biramdeo Baghela; Jalal Khan bin Daud; Hasan Khan bin Makkan; Ja'far bin Daud Chap †; Khizr Ayyub; Mukhtas Khan; Mubarak Khan; Malik Kalu	Hoshang Shah; Mahmud Khalji; Ghiyath Shah Commanders: Imad-ul-Mulk; Mubarak Ahmad; Muzaffar Ibrahim

Strength
Delhi: 10,000 cavalry	Unknown	Unknown

Casualties and losses
Heavy	Heavy	Heavy

The Kalpi War was a series of military campaigns in the early 15th century over control of Kalpi in North India. The kingdom, which encompassed parts of modern Jalaun, Kanpur, and surrounding areas, functioned as a strategic buffer state between the Jaunpur Sultanate, the Malwa Sultanate, and the Delhi Sultanate.

The conflicts began after the death of its first Sultan Nasiruddin Mahmud Shah and intensified under his son Qadir Shah. Sultan Ibrahim Shah of Jaunpur launched repeated invasions in 1413 and 1414, eventually forcing Kalpi to briefly acknowledge Jaunpur suzerainty. Shortly afterward, Kalpi shifted its allegiance to the Malwa Sultanate. A later invasion by Ibrahim Shah in 1427 was intervened by Delhi Sultan Mubarak Shah.

Another war began between Jaunpur and Malwa over the succession crisis after Qadir Shah's death in 1432. The final major campaign occurred in 1443–1444, when Jaunpur Sultan Mahmud Shah of Jaunpur invaded amid accusations of apostasy against Kalpi's ruler Nasir Khan bin Qadir Shah. Malwa Sultan Mahmud Khalji intervened on Kalpi's behalf, leading to a stalemate resolved by a treaty that restored Nasir Khan under Malwa influence while granting temporary concessions to Jaunpur. The wars ultimately weakened Kalpi's independence. It remained under the Malwa Sultanate before annexation by the Lodi dynasty of Delhi in 1484.

== Background ==
The tiny kingdom of Kalpi had succeeded by shiq Firuzpur which was placed under Malikzada Firuz wazir of Firuz Shah Tughluq. His son Nasiruddin Mahmud Shah (r. 1400–1411) founded the city of Muhammadabad at Kalpi and ruled independently after Timur's invasion of Delhi. It comprised the modern districts of Jalaun, Kanpur and some other neighbouring areas in Uttar Pradesh. The kingdom was a buffer zone between the Malwa Sultanate, Jaunpur Sultanate and Delhi Sultanate. Dilawar Khan of Malwa helped Nasiruddin Mahmud in war against the Rajput ruler Sumer, forging friendly relation with Kalpi. It later became a contested zone between the three. Nasiruddin Mahmud succeeded his son Qadir Shah (r. 1411–1432). In late 1411, on the appeal of Rai Sumer, Qadir Shah advanced with his army toward Bhongaon. He laid waste devastating the region. These events provided Sultan Ibrahim Shah with a casus belli. He led a campaign against Kalpi in April 1413.

== First Jaunpur invasion (1413–1414) ==
=== First invasion ===
In April 1413, Fath Khan, the deputy governor of Muhammadabad, sent urgent letters to Sultan Qadir Shah warning him that Sultan Ibrahim Shah of Jaunpur was rapidly advancing on the capital with a large army to capture it. Qadir Shah was still busy devastating Bhongaon. Upon receiving this news, he immediately ordered his army to return to the capital. Rai Sumer joined Qadir Shah with a large contingent. The following day, Ibrahim Shah arrived near the city with a massive force of soldiers and elephants and began the siege. The siege and skirmishes continued for some days. During this time, several valuable elephants of Ibrahim Shah died, which greatly disheartened him. After failing to capture the city he lifted the siege and returned to Jaunpur.

=== Second invasion ===
Next year in 1414, Ibrahim Shah once again advanced towards Muhammadabad with a huge army and numerous elephants. Biramdeo Baghela, the Muqaddam of Ghora, bore animosity since Nasiruddin Mahmud's sack of Ghora, Arail and Prayag joined Ibrahim Shah. Upon reaching the region, he quickly captured the important district of Mahoba and Rath then assigned it to Jalal Khan bin Daud. A nearby place, Shahpur was also captured and was given to Hasan Khan bin Makkan. Ibrahim himself proceeded and encamped at a short distance from Muhammadabad, while stationing Hasan Khan bin Makkan with their troops in the town of Shahpur. Ibrahim Shah then dispatched his wazir, Malik-ush-Sharq Maqbul, towards the fort of Erich. He along with Biramdeo besieged the fort. Bihamad Khan, was the governor of Erich. Malik Bihamad Khan fought a fierce battle but Maqbul captured the fort. He also captured Bhander, Chhatra, (Note: Located in Tikamgarh district) and other surrounding areas. Maqbul appointed Ja'far bin Daud Chap as the faujdar of Erich and Bhander was placed under Khizr Ayyub. He then marched along the bank of the Yamuna and joined Sultan Ibrahim Shah, who was encamped a few miles from Muhammadabad. Ibrahim then moved his army and encamped at the village of Shaikhpur, where he prepared catapults and ballistas for battle. Qadir Shah's army faced large casualties. The people of the city sent appeals for mercy to Sharqi sultan. Qadir Shah agreed for peace declaring Jaunpur suzerainty. Having achieved his objectives, Ibrahim Shah returned to his capital Jaunpur.

=== Allegiance to Malwa ===
During the year 1413–14, Hoshang Shah of Malwa was busy with internal matters and could not take direct action against Ibrahim Shah. However, he was determined to prevent Kalpi from falling under Sharqi control. While Qadir Shah was looking for allies, Hoshang Shah sought to establish his own sphere of influence. As a result, Hoshang Shah married his sister to Qadir Shah forming a political alliance. Qadir Shah maintained this allegiance to Malwa Sultanate, while Hoshang Shah preferred to keep Kalpi as a friendly buffer state rather than annexing it.

=== Qadir Shah's recovery of lost territories ===
Qadir Shah gave up his allegiance to Jaunpur Sultanate and captured Mahoba and Rath. Jalal Khan, the Jaunpur governor, sued for peace and withdrew. At the request of his wazir Daulat Khan bin Junaid Khan, Qadir Shah then advanced on the fort of Erich. After a siege lasting more than two years, the fort's defender Ja'far Daud was killed, and Erich fell to Daulat Khan. Qadir Shah then returned to his capital.

== Second Jaunpur invasion (1427–1428) ==
In early 1427, Sultan Ibrahim Sharqi marched against Qadir Shah of Kalpi. Qadir Shah sought urgent help from Sultan Mubarak Shah (r. 1421–1434) of Delhi. Mubarak Shah, who was then pursuing Muhammad Khan, the former governor of Bayana, immediately diverted his forces to assist Qadir Shah. While the Delhi army was advancing, Sharqi troops captured Bhongaon and moved toward Badaun. Ibrahim deputed a large force under his brother Mukhtas Khan to confront the Delhi troops. Mukhtas Khan reached Etawah. Mubarak Shah reached near Aligarh and sacked the village of Jatrauli and Atrauli. From there he dispatched his general Malik-ush-Sharq Mahmud Hasan with 10,000 cavalry. Mukhtas Khan immediately withdrew and rejoined the main Sharqi army. Sultan Ibrahim then advanced and camped near Burhanabad on the bank of the Kali Nadi close to Etawah. Sultan Mubarak Shah arrived the scene. The two armies clashed near Mali Kotah in February–March 1427. Finding himself outnumbered, Ibrahim retreated across the Yamuna and Rapri lastly encamped near Kaithar. Mubarak Shah pursued him and camped at Chandwar. After nearly twenty days of skirmishes, during which the Sharqis lost many horses, cattle, and prisoners, Ibrahim launched a direct attack. Mubarak Shah ordered his commanders Fath Khan, Zirak Khan, Islam Khan, Malik Chaman, Malik Kalu, Malik Ahmad Tufah, and Maqbul Khani to charge with full force. The decisive battle took place on 24 March 1428, with heavy losses on both sides. Both armies eventually withdrew. Sultan Ibrahim Sharqi returned to Jaunpur, while Sultan Mubarak Shah proceeded to Delhi, arriving on June 1428.

== Kalpi succession crisis (1432–1433) ==
After Qadir Shah's death in 1432, Nizam Khan bin Firuz Khan and Mubarak Khan bin Junaid Khan, the wazir raised Qadir Shah's son Jalal Khan to the throne. He was the son of Hoshang Shah's sister. Qadir Shah's eldest son, Nasir Khan, (Note: Tarikh-I-Muhammadi writes his name Zaghir Khan also Nasir Khan. Nizamuddin Ahmad and Firishta have Nasir Khan.) claimed the throne and sought the help of Jaunpur. Ibrahim Shah welcomed him, conferred upon him the title of Khan-i-Jahan, and marched with him towards Kalpi. Meanwhile, Jalal Khan proved to be a weak and pleasure-loving ruler who neglected state affairs, causing many nobles to turn against him. He was eventually imprisoned and sent to his uncle Sultan Hoshang Shah of Malwa, who bestowed a jagir at Chanderi. The nobles raised Firuz Khan to the throne. (Note: "At the same lime there came the representative of Sultan Hushang Shah in the Khitta of Chanderi, which was held by the Malwa ruler, and he, for the time being, raised the younger son of Ikhtiyarudin Qadir Shah, entitled Firoz Khan, to throne of his father at Muhammadabad, while the real power remained in the hands of Majlis 'Ali Nizam Khan bin Firoz Khan and Mubarak Khan bin Junaid Khan, the Wazir, and they administered the country." (Khani 1952, p. 72)) Ibrahim Shah learnt all these developments. In 1433–34, he along with Nasir Khan advanced from Jaunpur and besieged the capital Muhammadabad. Mubarak Khan and Nizam Khan defended the citadel for three months. Sultan Hoshang Shah of Malwa soon marched to Muhammadabad with his nephew Jalal Khan. When Ibrahim learned of Hoshang's approach, he raised the siege, crossed the Yamuna, and encamped opposite the city. Hoshang Shah was honourably received by Nizam Khan and reinstalled Jalal Khan as ruler. Firuz Khan disappeared from the records and was probably killed. Ibrahim installed Nasir Khan in the fort of Shahpur. It belonged to Kalpi but later Ibrahim Shah had captured it. Jalal Khan could not pacify the nobles. He ill-treated and arrested many nobles. Nizam Khan was killed while the wazir Mubarak Khan left the Muhammadabad and settled in his own iqta of Erich. Some nobles then fled to Jaunpur and sought Ibrahim's help. Learning of this, Hoshang Shah again marched to Kalpi along with Jalal Khan. The two armies met at Mardanpur, where a battle took place and both sides suffered heavy losses. Both rulers wished to avoid a prolonged conflict, so Hoshang Shah left Jalal Khan at Muhammadabad and returned to Malwa. As soon as Hoshang withdrew, Ibrahim Sharqi rapidly marched back and besieged Muhammadabad once more. Finding their position weak, the wazir Mubarak Khan and several other nobles defected to Ibrahim. Jalal Khan fled to Bhander, and Muhammadabad fell to the Sharqi forces. Ibrahim installed Nasir Khan as the new ruler of Kalpi. However, Nasir Khan could not adjust to the role and soon abdicated in favour of his brother Jalal Khan, who was re-enthroned. Nasir Khan retired at Haseenpur. Ibrahim then reconciled with Jalal Khan and sent him a robe of honour along with valuable presents.

== Last Jaunpur invasion (1443–1444) ==
After the death of Hoshang Shah, many nobles started declaring their independence weakening Kalpi. The wazir, Mubarak Khan occupied Erich and Isma'il Khan bin Nizam Khan in Jathra declared independence, while Nasir Khan occupied Rath and Mahoba. Jalal Khan remained ruler only in the reduced territory of Muhammadabad (Kalpi). After Jalal Khan’s death in 846 AH corresponding to 1442–43, Nasir Khan succeeded to the throne of Kalpi. However, the independent nobles, whom he tried to subdue, plotted against him. They accused him of anti-Islamic activities to attract Jaunpur and Malwa. Nasir Khan strongly denied these charges, claiming they were mere propaganda by his enemies. Mahmud Shah of Jaunpur and Mahmud Khalji of Malwa both wanted to make use of it. As Kalpi was a vassal of Malwa since Hoshang Shah's time, Mahmud Sharqi wanted approval from Mahmud Khalji.

In 1443, a private envoy of Jaunpur to the court of Malwa, alleged that Nasir Khan of Kalpi had left Islam. Accusations were brought up that Nasir Khan, had abandoned the tenets of Islam including fasting, Salah. Sharia, that he killed people and destroyed mosques. He was also accused to have ruined Mahoba and turned schools and mosques into dwelling places for swine and dogs, and that he gave the daughters of Muslims to Bana Kamal, who employed them in singing and dancing. Furthermore he also allegedly destroyed the prosperous town of Shahpur, imprisoned and tortured its Muslims, and handed over their women to strangers. Thus, the envoy asked Mahmud Khalji to punish him otherwise let Mahmud Sharqi to handle it himself. Mahmud Khalji replied that he was busy fighting against Mewar so Mahmud Sharqi should only warn him. This gave indirect and unofficial consent to Mahmud Sharqi of Jaunpur to deal with Nasir Khan. Mahmud Sharqi pleased sent twenty-nine elephants to Malwa. He did this because he was unhappy with Nasir's independent behaviour and wanted to force him to accept Malwa's suzerainty. Next, he then proceeded to Invade Mewar pretending to march against Kalpi. Nasir Khan knowing this sent his uncle Ali Khan with presents and tribute to Mandu capital of Malwa Sultanate.

Mahmud Sharqi besieging Kalpi, occupied it and its important Qasbas. Nasir Khan fled to Chanderi which was then part of Kalpi. After Mahmud Khalji's return, Nasir appealed to him again and sent Ali Khan. Before confronting Jaunpur, Mahmud Khalji's wrote a letter to Mahmud Sharqi requesting him to restore Nasir to Kalpi. In the letter, he insisted that Nasir has repented from his wrong doings, returned to the path of Islam, and submitted to Malwa. He and his ancestors were under Malwa's protection. Therefore, he should be reinstated. He also threatened to attack Mahmud Sharqi if he denied the demand. Mahmud Sharqi destroyed Kalpi and gave away Muslim women to the Hindus such as muqaddams of Khora and Bagesar who helped him in that siege. After further requests from Nasir, Mahmud Khalji marched towards Kalpi on 2nd Shaban 848 AH, which is 8 January 1444. (Note: 2nd Sha'ban 848 A.H. corresponds to: 8 January 1444 AD.; 14 November 1444 AD.) Nasir Khan also joined him at Chanderi. From Chanderi Mahmud Khalji marched towards Erich and Bhander. Mahmud Sharqi came out from Kalpi to oppose them. He reached Erich and secured alliance of Mubarak Khan and Jughlati, the adopted son of Qadir Shah to protect Erich.

Mahmud Sharqi of Jaunpur positioned his army in a hilly area. Mahmud Khalji of Malwa camped at Qasba of Chakni, near Kalpi. Mahmud Sharqi then moved by another route and took a strong defensive position near Kalpi, accessible from only one side. The advance guards of both armies clashed, and the Malwa forces defeated the Jaunpur troops, capturing supplies and animals. Mahmud Sharqi attacked with his elephants but could not dislodge the Malwa forces after a full day of fighting. The next day, Malwa generals Imad-ul-Mulk and Mubarak Ahmad attacked the entrance of Sharqi's position but achieved no decisive result. Finally, Mahmud Khalji plundered some villages of Kalpi and returned towards Mandu. He halted at Fathabad, sent Muzaffar Ibrahim with a large Malwa army. When Muzaffar Ibrahim was plundering areas near Erich, he learned that Sharqi general Malik Kalu had reached Rath. Muzaffar immediately marched to Rath, besieged the fort at night, and forced Malik Kalu to flee. Muzaffar captured the fort, enslaved many local people who had switched sides to Jaunpur, and sent them to Chanderi. After taking Rath, Muzaffar Ibrahim advanced toward Erich. Learning that Mahmud Sharqi had crossed the Betwa River into Parhar territory, he moved to protect the loyal Rai of Parhar. Sharqi turned back but retreated to his earlier strong position instead of fighting. Mahmud Khalji then sent Ghiyath Shah with fifty-two elephants to reinforce Muzaffar Ibrahim.

=== Treaty ===
Both sides exhausted as the war showed no signs of ending. Mahmud Sharqi sought the help of the local Sufi saint, Shaikh-ul-Islam Shaikh Ja'ilda, to mediate for peace. Through trusted emissaries, the following terms were proposed and accepted:

1. Mahoba and Rath would be immediately ceded to the Sultanate of Malwa.
2. Erich and Kalpi would remain under Sharqi control in the short term.
3. Sharqi forces would hand over Kalpi and other captured territories to Nasir Khan after four months, once both armies had withdrawn.
4. Mahmud Sharqi promised not to interfere with Nasir Khan in the future.
5. Rath would also be handed over directly to Nasir Khan.

Mahmud Khalji accepted these proposals on the condition that Sharqi would honour the agreement. After the treaty, Mahmud Khalji returned to Mandu, while Mahmud Sharqi returned to Jaunpur.

== Aftermath ==
Nasir Khan continued his allegiance to Malwa. After the death of Mahmud Khalji, his successor Ghiyath Shah (r. 1469–1500) followed a peaceful policy. Taking advantage of this, Bahlul Lodi (r. 1451–1489) gradually increased his power. In 1484, he captured the territories of Bayana, Hindoun, Kalpi, and raided Alhanpur, an outpost of Ranthambhore. He conferred Kalpi on A'zam Humayun son of Khwaja Bayazid.

== List of conflicts ==
Conflicts	Date	Location	Belligerents		Result
Siege of Kalpi	c. 1413	Kalpi	Kingdom of Kalpi	Jaunpur Sultanate	Kalpi victory
Siege of Mahoba	c. 1414	Mahoba	Kingdom of Kalpi	Jaunpur Sultanate	Jaunpur victory
Capture of Rath	c. 1414	Rath	Kingdom of Kalpi	Jaunpur Sultanate	Jaunpur victory
Siege of Erich	c. 1414	Erich	Kingdom of Kalpi	Jaunpur Sultanate	Jaunpur victory
Capture of Shahpur	c. 1414	Shahpur	Kingdom of Kalpi	Jaunpur Sultanate	Jaunpur victory
Siege of Bhander	c. 1414	Bhander	Kingdom of Kalpi	Jaunpur Sultanate	Jaunpur victory
Capture of Chhatra	c. 1414	Chhatra	Kingdom of Kalpi	Jaunpur Sultanate	Jaunpur victory
Battle of Shaikhpur	c. 1414	Shaikhpur	Kingdom of Kalpi	Jaunpur Sultanate	Jaunpur victory
Siege of Mahoba	c. 1414	Mahoba	Kingdom of Kalpi	Jaunpur Sultanate	Kalpi victory
Capture of Rath	c. 1414	Rath	Kingdom of Kalpi	Jaunpur Sultanate	Kalpi victory
Siege of Erich	c. 1416	Erich	Kingdom of Kalpi	Jaunpur Sultanate	Kalpi victory
Capture of Bhongaon	c. 1427	Bhongaon	Kingdom of Kalpi	Jaunpur Sultanate	Jaunpur victory
Siege of Kalpi	c. 1433	Kalpi	Kingdom of Kalpi; Malwa Sultanate	Jaunpur Sultanate	Kalpi victory
Battle of Mardanpur	c. 1433	Mardanpur	Kingdom of Kalpi; Malwa Sultanate	Jaunpur Sultanate	Inconclusive
Siege of Kalpi	c. 1443	Kalpi	Kingdom of Kalpi	Jaunpur Sultanate	Jaunpur victory
Siege of Rath	c. 1444	Rath	Kingdom of Kalpi; Malwa Sultanate	Jaunpur Sultanate	Malwa–Kalpi victory
Battle of Rath	c. 1444	Rath	Kingdom of Kalpi; Malwa Sultanate	Jaunpur Sultanate	Treaty

== Bibliography ==
- Khani, Muhammad Bihamad (1952). Tarikh-I-Muhammadi (PDF). Translated by Zaki, Muhammad. Aligarh: Asia Publishing House.
- Day, Upendra Nath (1965). Medieval Malwa: A Political and Cultural History, 1401-1562. Munshi Ram Manohar Lal. ISBN 978-81-215-0401-0.
- Hussain, Syed Ejaz (2025-10-27). Shiraz-I Hind: A History of Jaunpur Sultanate. BRILL. ISBN 978-90-04-75387-7.
- Saeed, Mian Muhammad (1972). The Sharqi Sultanate of Jaunpur: A Political & Cultural History. University of Karachi.
- Habib, Mohammad; Nizami, Khaliq Ahmad (1970). A Comprehensive History of India. Vol. 5, Part 2. People's Publishing House.
