= Qadir Shah =

Sultan of Kalpi from 1411 to 1432

- Sultan al–Karim; Abul Mujahid

Sultan of Kalpi
- Reign: 1411–1432
- Predecessor: Nasiruddin Mahmud
- Successor: Jalal Khan
- Wazir: Junaid Khan; Mubarak Khan
- Born: Qadir Khan
- Died: c. 1432; Kalpi; Kingdom of Kalpi
- Burial: Kalpi (now in Uttar Pradesh, India)
- Spouse: Sister of Hoshang Shah
- Issue: Nasir Khan; Jalal Khan; Firuz Khan; Jughlati (adopted)
Names
- Qadir Khan bin Mahmud Khan
Regnal name
- Ikhtiyar-ud-dunya-waddin Qadir Shah
- Father: Nasiruddin Mahmud
- Religion: Islam

Qadir Shah (Persian: قدیر شاه), born Qadir Khan, was the second Sultan of Kalpi, ruling from 1411 to 1432. He succeeded his father, Sultan Nasiruddin Mahmud Shah assuming the title Ikhtiyar-ud-din Qadir Shah. His reign was marked by territorial expansion, internal rebellions, and repeated invasions of the powerful Sultanate of Jaunpur.

Qadir Shah successfully defended his capital Muhammadabad (Kalpi) against invasions by Sultan Ibrahim Shah of Jaunpur in 1413 and 1414, before briefly accepting Jaunpur suzerainty. He later shifted allegiance to the Malwa Sultanate through a marriage alliance with Hoshang Shah. He also conducted campaigns against local Rajput chiefs and refractory zamindars in the region. He died in 1432 while returning from a campaign and was succeeded by his son Jalal Khan.

== Reign ==
Sultan Nasiruddin Mahmud Shah died in 1411. His son Qadir Khan who served as Ariz-i-Mamalik (military matters) succeeded his father with the support of his uncle Junaid Khan, the wazir. He assumed the title Ikhtiyar-ud-dunya-waddin Qadir Shah.

=== Rebellions ===
After Sultan’s accession, his brother Muhammad Khan rebelled, instigated by Turkish nobles. The wazir Junaid Khan controlled the revolt. Muhammad Khan was pacified by granting him the iqta of Khitta-i-Bhander.

Following the Wazir's advice, the Sultan marched against rebels. He crossed the Yamuna River. Near mauza of Jakdha his forces suffered defeat in battle; several nobles were killed. The Sultan returned to the capital. The Rajput ruler Sumer then advanced on Muhammadabad with a large force to destroy the city. Informed of the threat, the Sultan, after consulting the Wazir, marched again. His army decisively defeated the invaders. Sumer fled the battlefield, abandoning his insignia. The Kalpi army captured many prisoners, horses, and booty. Local chiefs finally submitted to his authority. Meanwhile, Junaid Khan died. His eldest son Daulat Khan received the post of wazir. Rai Sumer offered allegiance to the Sultan. In late 1411, at Sumer's request Qadir Shah invaded Bhongaon and devastated the region.

=== Jaunpur invasion ===
Sultan Ibrahim Shah of Jaunpur making the invasion of Bhongaon excuse invaded Kalpi in April 1413. Fath Khan, deputy governor of Muhammadabad, urgently notified the Sultan Qadir Shah that the Ibrahim Shah was advancing with a large army to capture the capital. Qadir Shah, who was busy in Bhongaon, immediately rushed back with his forces. Rai Sumer also joined him with a large contingent. The next day, Ibrahim Shah arrived with a massive army and elephants and laid siege to the city. After several days of skirmishes, during which many of his valuable elephants died. Ibrahim Shah became disheartened. Failing to capture the city, he lifted the siege and returned to Jaunpur. Next year, in 1414, Ibrahim Shah again marched on Muhammadabad with a huge army and many elephants. He was joined by Biramdeo Baghela, the Muqaddam of Ghora, who bore enmity against Kalpi since Nasiruddin Mahmud's sack of Ghora, Arail and Prayag. Ibrahim Shah quickly captured Mahoba and Rath, assigning them to Jalal Khan bin Daud. Next Shahpur was captured and assigned to Hasan Khan bin Makkan. Marching forward, he encamped near Muhammadabad while sending his Wazir, Malik-ush-Sharq Maqbul, along with Biramdeo, to besiege the fort of Erich. After a fierce battle, Maqbul captured Erich, Bhander, Chhatra, and surrounding areas. He appointed Ja'far bin Daud Chap as faujdar of Erich and placed Bhander under Khizr Ayyub. Maqbul then rejoined Ibrahim near Muhammadabad. Ibrahim advanced and camped at Shaikhpur, where he prepared siege engines. Qadir Shah's forces suffered heavy casualties. When the people of Muhammadabad appealed for mercy, Qadir Shah agreed to peace and accepted Jaunpur's suzerainty. Having achieved his goals, Ibrahim Shah returned to Jaunpur.

Hoshang Shah of Malwa was determined to assert his influence over neighbouring kingdom of Kalpi as well as preventing it to fall under Sharqi control. As a result, Hoshang Shah married his sister to Qadir Shah forming a political alliance. Qadir Shah switched back his allegiance from Jaunpur to Malwa while Hoshang Shah preferred to keep Kalpi as a friendly buffer state rather than annexing it.

Qadir Shah giving up his allegiance to Jaunpur, captured Mahoba and Rath. Jalal Khan, the Jaunpur governor, sued for peace and withdrew. At the request of his wazir Daulat Khan, Qadir Shah then advanced on the fort of Erich. After a siege lasting more than two years, the fort's defender Ja'far Daud was killed, and Erich fell to Daulat Khan. Qadir Shah then returned to his capital.

=== Rebellion of Muhammad Khan ===
Meanwhile, the Sultan's elder brother, Muhammad Khan, rebelled in Muhammadabad and fled to the fort of Bhander. He overthrew the allegiance of Qadir Shah. Wazir Daulat Khan bin Junaid Khan was sent with a large army to persuade him, but Muhammad Khan, blinded by ambition clearly refused. The Sultan then marched personally to Bhander. He encamped near the fort of Bhander, and started fighting. Muhammad Khan came out of the fort with all his cavalry and infantry and engaged in battle. When Muhammad Khan realized the numerical strength of the royal army, he again retreated and shut himself up in the fort. He eventually surrendered, was granted protection but later imprisoned. He died in captivity. The fort of Bhander was assigned to Nusrat-ul-Mulk Lutfullah, and the royal forces returned victorious to the capital. One year after Muhammad Khan's death, Wazir Daulat Khan also died. The office of Wazir was then conferred upon his brother Mubarak Khan.

=== Further campaigns ===
After some time, Sultan Qadir Shah and wazir Mubarak Khan, marched against the towns of Samuni and Sahndana. He plundered and razed the towns. When news of the destruction spread, Rai Tas, a powerful chief, came to aid the local muqaddams and attacked the Sultan's forces. A fierce battle ensued in which the Kalpi army was initially pushed back, but the Wazir fought bravely. Upon learning of the situation, the Sultan personally charged with his elite cavalry. Rai Sumer and Bairam also joined with their forces. Overwhelmed by the Sultan's strength, Rai Tas fled the battlefield after heavy losses and took refuge in the deserts. Later, Rai Tas sent his son Satan to sue for peace. The Sultan granted pardon, honoured Rai Tas with a robe, and returned victoriously to Muhammadabad. He also besieged the strong fort of Bitur (Betul). Unable to capture it, he made peace and returned.

=== Second Jaunpur invasion ===
In early 1427, Sultan Ibrahim Sharqi again attacked Kalpi. Qadir Shah appealed for help to Sultan Mubarak Shah of Delhi, personally marched to assist him. While Mubarak Shah advanced, Sharqi forces captured Bhongaon and moved toward Badaun. Ibrahim sent his brother Mukhtas Khan to Etawah. Mubarak Shah reached near Aligarh, sacked Jatrauli and Atrauli, and dispatched 10,000 cavalry under Malik-ush-Sharq Mahmud Hasan. Mukhtas Khan withdrew seeing the Delhi army. After further developments, the two main armies finally clashed near Mali Kotah in Feb–March 1427 AD. Outnumbered, Ibrahim retreated across the Yamuna. After weeks of skirmishes, a major battle was fought on 24 March 1428. Both sides suffered heavy losses and withdrew. Ibrahim returned to Jaunpur, while Mubarak Shah marched back to Delhi.

== Death ==
While carrying out campaigns against local rulers Qadir Shah fell seriously ill and could no longer ride. Carried in a litter, he marched against Sahndana, plundered the city, and returned with rich booty. His condition worsened after reaching the capital. He died in 1432 AD. The nobles raised Qadir Shah's son, Jalal Khan, to the throne.

== Family ==
Qadir Shah had married a daughter of Dilawar Khan of Malwa, and thus a sister of Hoshang Shah. He had three known sons:

- Nasir Khan Khan-i-Jahan (r. 1443–1444). He succeeded his younger brother, Jalal Khan, as sultan of Kalpi.
- Jalal Khan (r. 1432–1443). He was a nephew of Hoshang Shah. He succeeded his father as sultan, however was quickly deposed in favor of his younger brother, Firuz Khan. However, after his uncle's intervention, he was reinstated, and ruled in Kalpi till his death in 1443.
- Firuz Khan. He was a younger son of Qadir Shah, and was briefly enthroned by Mubarak Khan the Wazir and Majlis-i-Ali Nizam Khan, but was deposed soon after. According to inscriptions from Bari, Firuz Shah bin Qadir Shah was a nephew of Tughluq Khan. One inscription further records that Firuz's descendant Alam Shah settled at Chanderi, while Alam Shah's son Bahadur Shah constructed a well at Bari during the reign of Mughal emperor Aurangzeb.

Qadir Khan is also known to have an adopted son, Jughlati, who sided with Mahmud Sharqi during the final stage of Kalpi War.

== See also ==
- Malikzada Firuz

== Bibliography ==
- Khani, Muhammad Bihamad (1972). Tarikh-I-Muhammadi (PDF). Translated by Zaki, Muhammad. Aligarh: Asia Publishing House. ISBN 978-0-210-40545-1.
- Day, Upendra Nath (1965). Medieval Malwa: A Political and Cultural History, 1401-1562. Munshi Ram Manohar Lal. ISBN 978-81-215-0401-0.
- Hussain, Syed Ejaz (2025-10-27). Shiraz-I Hind: A History of Jaunpur Sultanate. BRILL. ISBN 978-90-04-75387-7.
- Saeed, Mian Muhammad (1972). The Sharqi Sultanate of Jaunpur: A Political & Cultural History. University of Karachi.
- Habib, Mohammad; Nizami, Khaliq Ahmad (1970). A Comprehensive History of India. Vol. 5, Part 2. People's Publishing House.
