= Malikzada Firuz =

Wazir of the Delhi Sultanate from 1388 to 1389

Vizier of the Delhi Sultanate

Khan-i-Jahan
- Monarch: Tughluq Khan
- Preceded by: Junan Khan
- Succeeded by: Rukn al-Din Junda
- In office 1388 – 20 February 1389

Wāli of Shiq Firuzpur
- In office 1377–1388
- Preceded by: Office established
- Succeeded by: Nasiruddin Mahmud

Personal details
- Died: 20 February 1389 Delhi, Delhi Sultanate
- Children: Nasiruddin Mahmud; Junaid Khan; Nizam Khan; Ahmad Khan; Muzaffar Khan; Khalil Khan
- Parent: Malik Taj al-Din Turk (father)

Malikzada Firuz (Persian: ملکزاده فیروز) born Firuz Khan (Persian: فیروز خان) was the noble of the Delhi Sultanate during the Tughlaq dynasty. He served as governor of the shiq of Firuzpur under Sultan Firoz Shah Tughluq (r. 1351–1388) and later rose to the position of Wazir under Sultan Tughluq Khan (r. 1388–1389). His son Nasiruddin Mahmud succeeded him in Shiq Firuzpur later founded the independent Kingdom of Kalpi in 1390. Malikzada Firuz was killed on 20 February 1389 alongside the Sultan Tuqhlaq Khan during a palace coup in Delhi.

== Biography ==
Malikzada Firuz born Firuz Khan was the son of Malik Taj al-Din Turk who served as the Naib of Gujarat under Qutbuddin Mubarak Shah (r. 1316–1320) and Ghiyath al-Din Tughluq (r. 1320–1325).

=== Wali of Shiq Firuzpur ===
In 1377–78 AD (779 AH), Sultan Firoz Shah Tughlaq led expedition against the rebellious muqaddams Rai Sumer and Adharan of Etawah. During the campaign, the Sultan camped on the bank of the Yamuna River opposite the village of Kanar Khera 26°25′N 79°16′E. He built a new fort there and named it Firuzpur after himself. He gave the new fort and the newly created Shiq Firuzpur to Malikzadah Firuz. He placed the older fort of Kanar under Malik Hasan Makkan. To strengthen Malikzadah Firuz's position, the Sultan also added Tughluqpur and the Iqtas of Erich, Chanderi, Shahpur, and Rapri (Note: Located in present day Manipuri district at 26°58′N 78°36′E) to his territory. The Sultan honoured Malikzadah Firuz with a robe of honour and other royal favours. Additional forts were built at Akhal (renamed Tughlaqpur) and Patlahi. Malikzadah Firuz was stationed there with a large force and important amirs to secure the region. After making these arrangements Firoz Shah returned to Delhi. Malikzada Firuz appointed his elder son, Azam Humayun Mahmud Khan, as the commander of the forces and Ariz (military administrator) of the shiqq of Firuzpur. He governed the territories upholding justice. He spread Islam in the towns of Bhongaon, Phaphund and Chandwar.

==== Siege of Gagron ====
From Shiq Firuzpur, Malikzadah Firuz was dispatched with a large army to capture the Gagron Fort. He himself besieged the fort, plundered the surrounding areas, but could not capture it due to strong resistance. He eventually made peace, imposed tribute, and returned successfully.

=== Wizarat of the Delhi Sultanate ===
In 1388 AD, Tughluq Khan ascended the throne and Malikzada Firuz was appointed on the post of Wazir, receiving the title Khan-i-Jahan. He was a learned and capable administrator. The post of Niabat-i-Wizarat was conferred on Malik Rukn al-Din Junda. During Malikzada Firuz's tenure as Wazir, the Shiqq of Firuzpur suffered major territorial losses. Forces under his son Malikzadah Mahmud were defeated by Rajput chiefs Udharan and Sumer near Masalpur. As a result, several important towns including Chandwar, Bhongaon, Phaphund, Bairichh, Mahoni, and Ratwa fell to the Rajputs, significantly weakening Muslim control in the region.

== Death ==
The Naib Wazir Rukn al-Din Junda, conspired with Turkish nobles and other maliks to assassin the Sultan Tughlaq Khan and his Wazir Malikzada Firuz. On Friday 20 February 1389, the rebels murdered Malik Mubarak Kabir Khalifati, stormed the palace, and looted it. Sultan Tughluq Khan, Malikzada Firuz and several other nobles were killed in the uprising. He was then known as Khan-i-Shahid. They placed Abu Bakr Shah on the throne and Junda took the place of wazir.

== Family ==
Malikzada Firuz's known sons are:

- Mahmud Khan, his oldest son. He established the Kingdom of Kalpi, and ruled as Sultan Nasiruddin Mahmud from 1400 to 1411.
- Junaid Khan, entitled Azam Humayun Dastur-i-Sultan Nishan. He loyally served as his brother's wazir from 1400 till his death. He was assigned the iqta of Erich as his jagir. He had at least two sons:
  - Daulat Khan, who succeeded his father as Wazir of the Sultanate of Kalpi, and died in office.
  - Mubarak Khan, who succeeded his older brother as Wazir. He, along with his uncle Nizam Khan, deposed Jalal Khan and briefly installed Firuz Khan, a younger son of Qadir Shah on the throne, however after Hoshang Shah's intervention agreed to reinstall Jalal Khan as sovereign. During the Kalpi-Jaunpur war, he sided with Ibrahim Shah Sharqi, and soon after assumed independence. During the Malwa-Jaunpur war he sided with Mahmud Sharqi, however he was accused by the locals of Erich to be oppressive, and was deposed and imprisoned by Mahmud Sharqi in 1445. His son Usman Khan was married to a daughter of Ismail Khan ibn Nizam Khan.
- Nizam Khan, entitled Majlis-i-Ali. He, along with Wazir Mubarak Khan, had deposed Jalal Khan, and was killed by Jalal Khan when he retook power. He was assigned the iqta of Jathra. He is known to have at least three sons:
  - Yakub Khan. He was imprisoned by Jalal Khan.
  - Umar Khan. He was killed alongside his father by Jalal Khan.
  - Ismail Khan. He inherited his father's title of Majlis-i-Ali, and later assumed independence in Jathra. An inscription from Jathra dated 1436 mentions his title as Shams-ad Duniya wa ad-din Ismail Khan bin Nizam Khan, ruler of Jathra. After the Malwa-Jaunpur war, Ismail accepted the suzerainty of Mahmud Khalji of Malwa. He also helped Mahmud Khalji to put down a rebellion in Chanderi.
- Ahmad Khan, who served as Naib-i-Ghaybat during his older brother's reign.
- Muzaffar Khan. His son Daulatnak had rebelled against Qadir Shah, but his rebellion was put down by Qadir Shah's general, Bihamad Khan.

A jama masjid (congregational mosque) was built in Erich by Ghazi Zia-ud-Din, a brother of Junaid Khan (and thus a son of Malikzada Firuz), the contemporary jagirdar of Erich, during the reign of Mahmud Shah.

== Bibliography ==
- Khani, Muhammad Bihamad (1952). Tarikh-I-Muhammadi (PDF). Translated by Zaki, Muhammad. Aligarh: Asia Publishing House.
- Day, Upendra Nath (1965). Medieval Malwa: A Political and Cultural History, 1401-1562. Munshi Ram Manohar Lal. ISBN 978-81-215-0401-0.
- Jackson, Peter (1999-04-01). The Delhi Sultanate: A Political and Military History. Cambridge University Press. ISBN 978-0-521-40477-8.
