= Jami' masjid of Dilawar Khan, Ujjain =

Jami' mosque of Dilāwar Khān بغیر بنیاد کی مسجد
- Mosque
- Nickname: बिना नींव की मस्जिद
- Location in present-day Madhya Pradesh, India Jami' mosque of Dilāwar Khān (Madhya Pradesh)
- Coordinates: 23.1°N 75.45°E
- Country: India
- State: Madhya Pradesh
- District: Ujjain
- Established: 1403-04
- Founder: Dilāwar Khān
- Elevation: 510 m (1,670 ft)

Languages
  - Official: Hindi
- Time zone: UTC+5:30 (IST)

Jami' masjid of Dilawar Khan, Ujjain, popularly known as the Binā nīṃva kī masjid (Urdu بغیر بنیاد کی مسجد; Hindi बिना नींव की मस्जिद; lit. 'a mosque without a foundation'), was a congregational mosque in Ujjain, Madhya Pradesh, India, not far from Danigate.

According to an inscription over the door, the building was constructed as the jama masjid (congregational mosque) during the reign of Dilawar Khan in AH 803 (1403–1404 CE).

== History ==
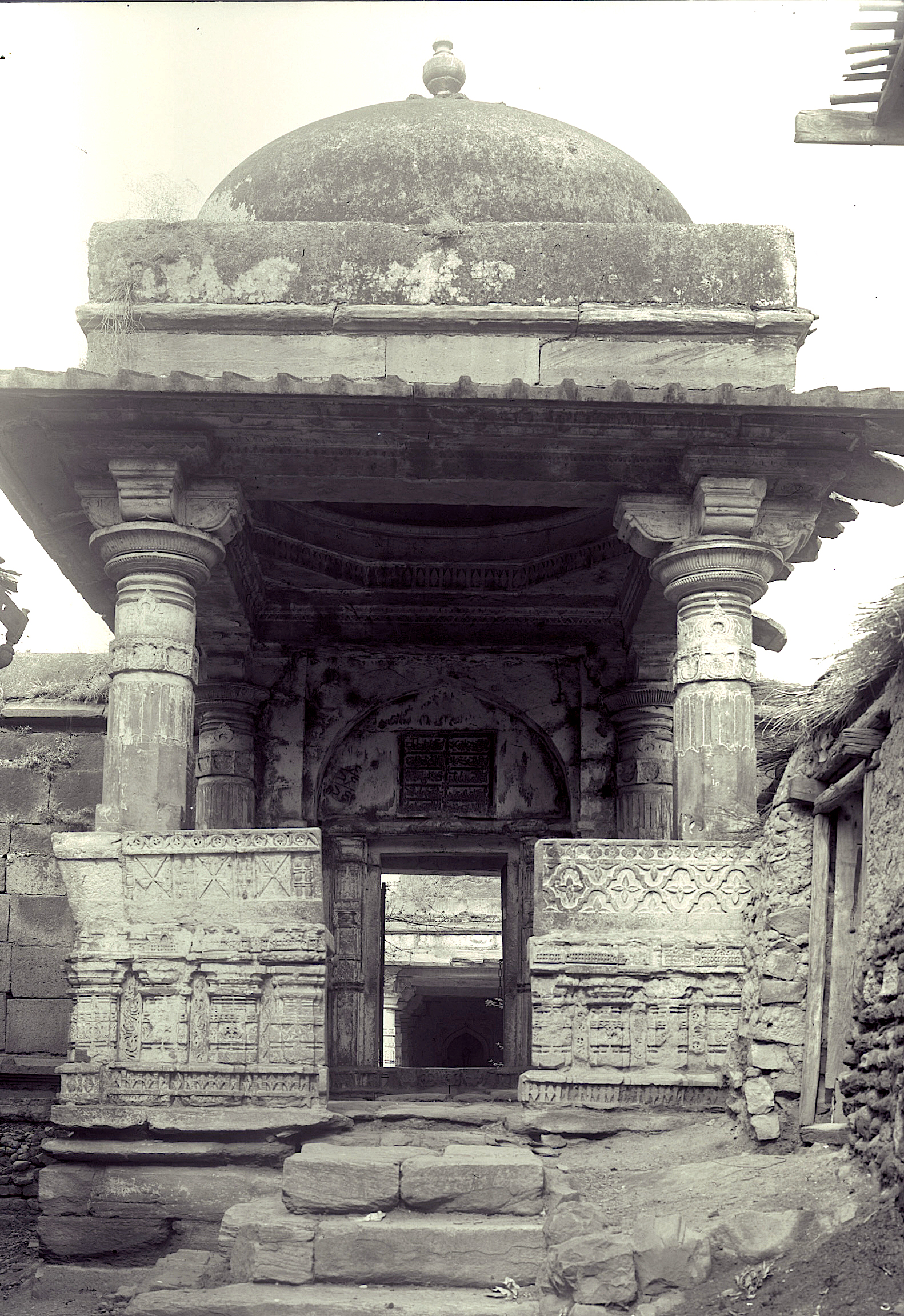
Ujjain, Madhya Pradesh. Entrance to the so-called 'mosque without a foundation' बिना नींव की मस्जिद as photographed by the Archaeology Department, Gwalior State, before 1947.

The mosque is dated by the inscription over the eastern entrance to 803 (1403–1404 CE) during the time of Dilawar Khan. The earliest known published image of the mosque is a photograph in Luard's gazetteer of the Gwalior State. The mosque incorporates re-used elements of the late Paramāra period, dating from 1100 CE and later, thus post-dating the reign of Bhoja of Malwa (died c. 1050). The dome and part of the parapet on the right side of the entrance portico were purpose-built and date to the 1400s.

== Name ==
The popular name is used locally to support various claims to the property, but idiomatically the phrase simply means a grand plan or project with no solid backing — the English equivalents being "a castle in the air" or "a pie in the sky." The name بغیر بنیاد کے مسجد बिना नींव की मस्जिद is not historically known, its first documented appearance comes only in 1908. Contrary to what the popular name might imply, the building was not thrown up on an ad hoc basis. The walls are constructed of neatly-cut ashlar, made for the purpose, and the courtyard, pillars, miḥrābs and dome are carefully positioned.

The name is likely a local twist on Bikhair bunayād (بخیر بنیاد; بغیر < بخیر), a reconstruction that gives the meaning "the mosque of the auspicious foundation" or "the mosque founded in goodness" (بخیر بنیاد کی مسجد). Saksena, who published the inscription in 1927, remarks that "the fanciful name baffles explanation except as a local joke," And indeed the distortion, which completely inverts the meaning, may be read as a conscious jibe — a process of the kind documented by Kuczkiewicz-Fraś in her study of how Perso-Arabic loanwords were adapted and often reshaped when entering Hindustani speech.

The word khair (خیر) can also be read as a chronogram, with a numerical value of 810 (kh) = 600, (i) = 10, (r) = 200), corresponding to 1407–08 CE, though the date given in the inscription is AH 803.
