= Farhan Nizami =

British–Indian academic

- Born: Aligarh

Academic background
- Education: Aligarh Muslim University; Wadham College, Oxford

Academic work
- Discipline: History

Farhan Nizami CBE is a historian of South Asia.

== Early life and education ==
Nizami is the youngest of five children of the historian K. A. Nizami and Razia Nizami.

Nizami completed his B.A. (Hons.) and M.A. in history at Aligarh Muslim University with a first class. He was awarded the University Medal, and the Khursheed Nurul Hasan Gold Medal in 1977. He was a National Scholar at the Centre for Advanced Study in History (1977–79) and the recipient of the University Medal in 1979. He completed his D.Phil. in modern history at Wadham College on an Oxford Overseas Scholarship in 1983. During 1982–83 he was elected to the Frere Exhibition.

== Career ==
Nizami has been described as having "contributed much towards a better understanding of inter-racial and inter-religious relations all over the world".

=== Academic ===
He is the founder-director of the Oxford Centre for Islamic Studies and Prince of Wales Fellow in the study of the Islamic World, Magdalen College, Oxford.

From 1983 he has been a Fellow of St Cross College, where he has also been Rothman's Fellow in Muslim History, subsequently fellow in Islamic studies, and is currently emeritus fellow there. He is a member of the faculties of History and Oriental studies at the University of Oxford.

He is founder-editor of the Journal of Islamic Studies (OUP, 1990-). He is the series editor of Makers of Islamic Civilization (OUP, 2004-). He specialises in Muslim social and intellectual history.

=== Administrative ===
He is chairman of the academic council of Wilton Park, U.K, member, academic committee, Cumberland Lodge, U.K, member, steering committee C-100, World Economic Forum, Davos (2004–2007), member, international advisory panel, World Islamic Economic Forum, Malaysia (2004–08), member, Council of the Al-Falah Programme, University of California, Berkeley (2000–2005), member, advisory board, Duke University's Islamic Studies Centre, member of the court of Oxford Brookes University, member, Christian Muslim Forum (2005–09), patron, Oxford Amnesty Lectures, director, Oxford Inspires, (2002–2003), member, advisory board, Dialogues Project, World Policy institute, New School University, NY (2003–), governor, Magdalen College School, Oxford (2005–).

== Awards ==
- Commander of the Order of the British Empire (CBE) for services to Islamic studies, 2006.
- Class IV Order of the Crown (Brunei).
