= Hoshang Shah =

Sultan of Malwa from 1406 to 1435

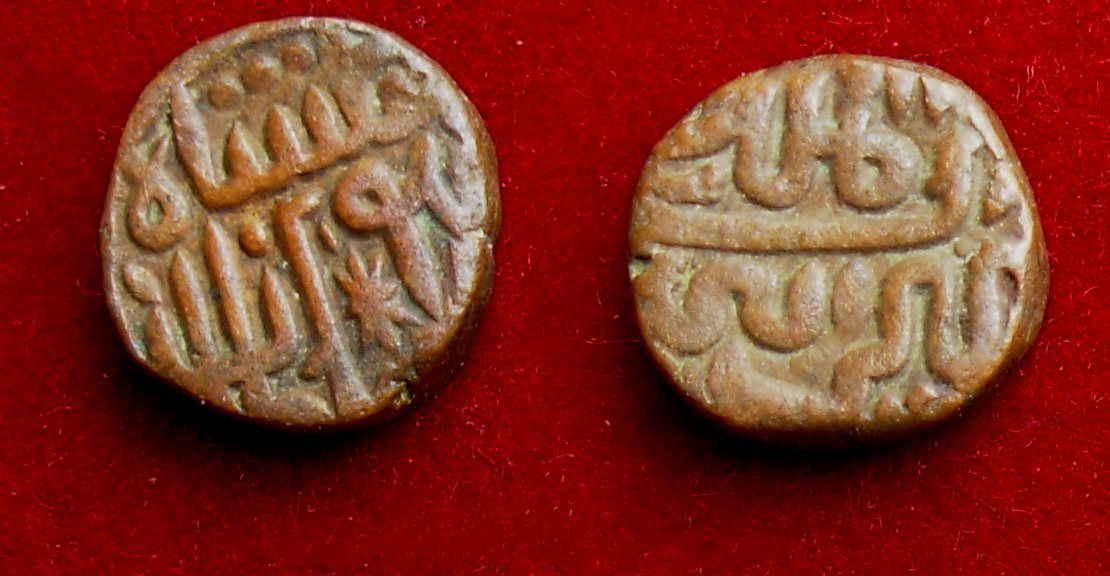
- Copper coin of Hoshang Shah

Sultan of Malwa
- Reign: 1409 – 6 July 1435
- Predecessor: Musa Shah
- Successor: Muhammad Shah
- Reign: 1406 –1407
- Predecessor: Dilawar Khan
- Successor: Muzaffar Shah I
- Born: Alp Khan c. 1375
- Died: 6 July 1435; Near Mandu
- Consort: Daughter of Ahmad Khan Farooqui
- Issue: Daud Khan; Muhammad Shah; Usman Khan; Fath Khan; Haibat Khan; Ahmad Khan; Umar Khan; Abu Ishaq; Three daughters
Names
- Hisam-ud-Din Hoshang Shah
Regnal name
- As-Sultan al-Azam Hisam-ud-Dunya wa-ud-Din Abu al-Mujahid Hoshang Shah as-Sultan
- Dynasty: Ghurid
- Father: Dilawar Khan
- Military career
- Service years: c. 1407–1435
- Conflicts: Muzaffar Shah's invasion of Malwa (1407); Malwa–Bahmani Wars; Conquest of Kherla (1420–1433); Invasion of Orissa (1422); Siege of Gagron (1423); Kalpi War (1432–1433)

Hisam al-Din Hoshang Shah (born Alp Khan; c. 1375 – 6 July 1435) was the first formally appointed Sultan of the Malwa Sultanate of Central India. Also called Hoshang Shah Ghori, he was known as Arslan Khan before he took on the title Hoshang Shah after being crowned the ruler of the Malwa Sultanate. Arslan Khan's father Dilawar Khan had belonged to the court of Firuz Shah Tughlaq, the Sultan of Delhi. Dilawar Khan Ghori was appointed governor of Malwa probably by Firuz of the house of Tughlaq but made himself independent of the Delhi Sultanate for all practical purposes in 1401. Thus, he had come to Mandu in 1401 practically as the first King of Malwa.

== Reign ==
Upon the death of Dilawar Khan in 1406, his son Alp Khan peacefully ascended the throne of Malwa, adopting the title As-Sultan-ul-Azam Husam-ud-Dunya wa-dm Abul-Mujahtd Hoshang Shah as-Sultan.

=== Invasion of Gujarat Sultanate ===
Rumour spread that Hoshang Shah had poisoned his father, Dilawar Khan. Muzaffar Shah of Gujarat seized upon this allegation as a pretext to launch an attack on Malwa. Using the rumour that Hoshang Shah had poisoned his father, Muzaffar Shah invaded Malwa to avenge the alleged crime. In late 1406 CE, Muzaffar Shah invaded the Malwa Sultanate. In 1407, he reached the capital Dhar, where Sultan Hoshang Shah confronted him. After a fierce battle in which Hoshan Shah was wounded. Hoshang was defeated and forced back into the fort. Muzaffar then besieged Dhar. When capturing the fort proved difficult, Muzaffar proposed peace, swearing an oath on the Quran and requesting a personal meeting. Hoshang's advisers warned suspecting trap and urged to wait until the rainy season forced the Gujaratis to withdraw. Ignoring their advice, Hoshang repeatedly met with Muzaffar. He eventually let his guard down and was arrested. Malwa was annexed by Gujarat Sultanate. Muzaffar appointed his brother Nusrat Khan to govern the territory. Hoshang Shah was taken captive to Gujarat.

=== Recovery of Malwa ===
Nusrat Khan's oppressive rule in Malwa faced with resistance. Local soldiers and nobles attacked him near Dhar, forcing him to flee. Local soldiers and nobles rose against him near Dhar and drove him out. Fearing Muzaffar Shah's retaliation, the Malwa nobles withdrew to Mandu. They elected Musa Khan, Hoshang's cousin, as their leader by December 1408. This effectively ended Gujarat's occupation of Malwa. Hushang Shah was released as situation went out of hands. Muzaffar sent his grandson Ahmad Khan to restore Hushang. Ahmad captured Dhar with ease, restored Hushang Shah on his throne and left for Gujarat. Hoshang Shah then tried to establish his rule over Dhar. Musa Khan did not submit to Hoshang's demand. Malik Mughis Khaljl came out of Mandu and joined him. In response, Hoshang seized surrounding districts to cut off the fort's revenue. This pressure distracted Musa Khan and convinced key nobles including Hoshang's cousin, Malik Mughith to defect. Unnerved by these major desertions, Musa Khan agreed to vacate the fort, allowing Hoshang to safely re-enter and reclaim his throne. Hoshang then transferred the capital to Mandu and appointed Malik Mughith as his naib and wazir. He was conferred the title Malik-ush-Sharq.

== Foreign relation ==
Hoshang Shah maintained consistently friendly relations with Nasir Khan Faruqi of Khandesh. He provided valuable assistance to Khandesh whenever required and successfully kept it as a strong buffer state between Malwa and the Deccan. This cordial relationship continued throughout most of his reign and lasted until 1508. He founded the city of Hoshangabad on the banks of the Narbada to guard the south-eastern frontier of the kingdom. He established his suzerainty over the kingdom of Kalpi by marrying his sister to Qadir Shah.

== Religion ==
His reign is marked by tolerance towards the local Hindu population. No forceful conversions or temple demolition is found. A Jain temple in Lalitpur was constructed in 1424 indicating his reign did not impose any religious restrictions. He won the support of the Rajput clans in his kingdom. Hoshang Shah patronised scholars and established a madrasa in Mandu. His patronage attracted many scholars and Sufi saints to Malwa. Early in his reign, he sought administrative advice from Haji Saiyid Ashraf Jahangir Samnani of Jaunpur. He also welcomed Shaikh Makhdum Qazi Burhan-ud-din with great honour and became his disciple. Sufi saints came to Malwa for his patron. Hoshang Shah received them warmly, including Saiyid Najm-ud-din Ghauth-ud-Dahr, who settled in Nalcha, Shaikh Yusuf Budha Erachchi alias Maqtul-ul-Ishq. Raju Qattal also visited Malwa during Hajj prilgrimage.

== Death ==
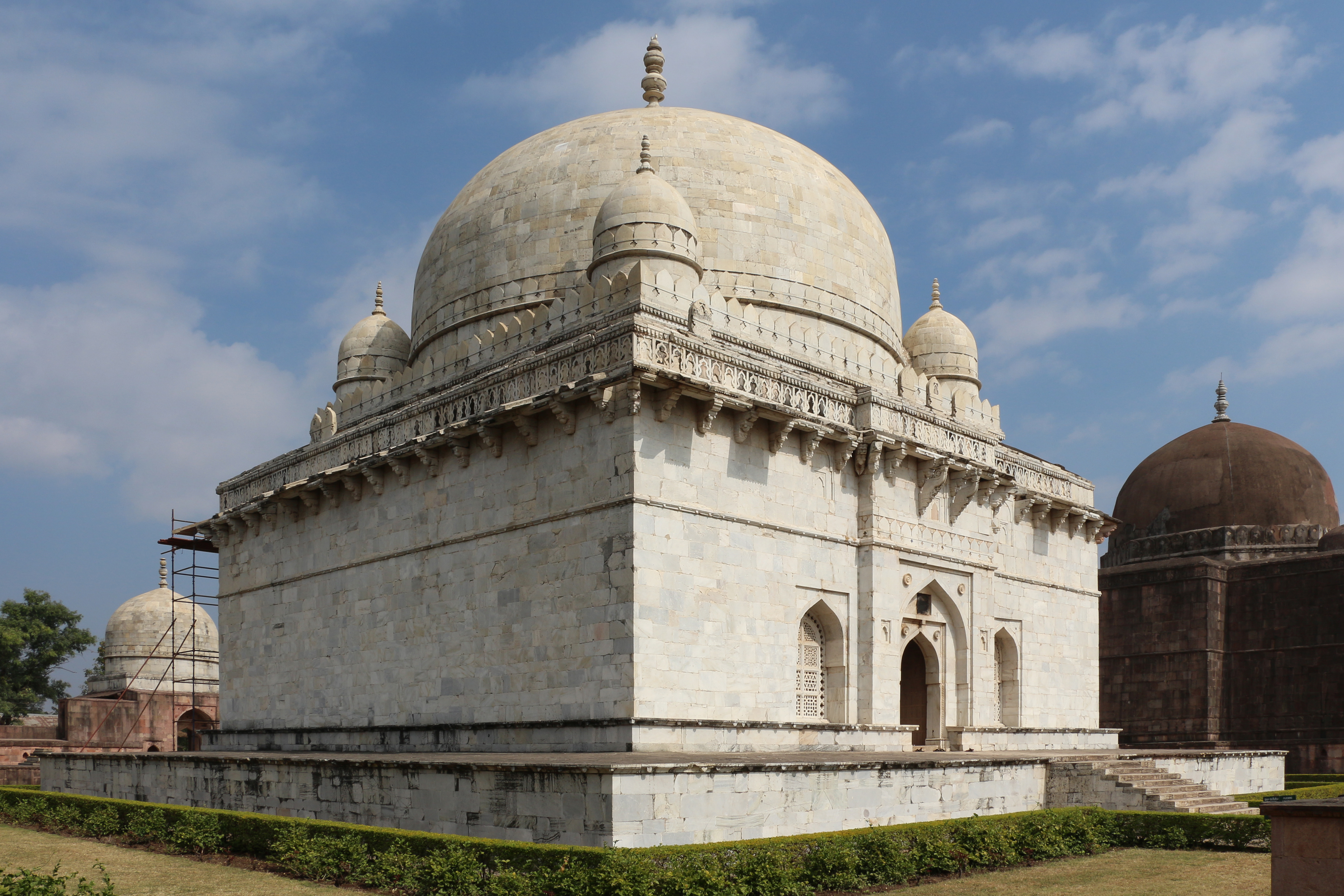
Hoshang Shah's Tomb in Mandu

According to Nizamuddin Ahmad, Hoshang Shah suffered from diabetes. Shihab Hakim's description of the symptoms indicate he must have died from Gallbladder disease. During his illness an occasion of extreme anger caused something to rupture in his urinary passage, leading to severe pain and bleeding. While being carried back to his capital Shadiabad (Mandu), another incident triggered intense rage, causing him to lose consciousness and fall into a coma. He died on the night of 8 Dhu'l-Hijja 838 AH corresponding 5 July 1435 AD while still en route to Mandu. He was buried in Mandu on the next day.

== Family ==
Hoshang Shah had fathered eight sons and three daughters by his two wives. His sons from his first wife, the daughter of the sultan of Khandesh Malik Ahmad Khan Farooqui, were Daud Khan, Usman Khan, Fath Khan and Haibat Khan, whereas from his second wife he had Ghazni Khan, Ahmad Khan, Umar Khan and Abu Ishaq. Of these sons, the oldest, Daud Khan had died in his father's lifetime, hence the second oldest, Ghazni Khan was chosen as the crown prince by their father. The rivalry between the two groups of princes plagued the last days of Hoshang Shah, and when Usman revolted, Hoshang ordered the imprisonment of his sons from his first wife, thus paving the way for Ghazni Khan's eventual ascension as Muhammad Shah. A daughter of Hoshang had married Mahmud Khan, a cousin of Hoshang, who eventually ascended the throne as Mahmud Khalji.

== Bibliography ==
- Majumdar, Ramesh Chandra (1960). The History and Culture of the Indian People. Vol. 6. Bharatiya Vidya Bhavan.
- Day, Upendra Nath (1965). Medieval Malwa: A Political and Cultural History, 1401-1562. Munshi Ram Manohar Lal. ISBN 978-81-215-0401-0.
- Haig, W. (1928). The Cambridge History of India: Turks and Afghans, edited by W. Haig. Vol. III. Cambridge University Press.
- Habib, Mohammad; Nizami, Khaliq Ahmad, eds. (1970). A Comprehensive History of India: The Delhi Sultanat (A.D. 1206-1526). Vol. V. People's Publishing House.
