= Dasharna =

Dasharna (Sanskrit:दशार्ण Daśārṇa) was an ancient Indian janapada (realm) in eastern Malwa region between the Dhasan River and the Betwa River. The name of the janapada was derived from the Daśārṇa, the ancient name of the Dhasan River. The janapada was also known as Akara and Rudradaman I in his Junagarh rock inscription referred to this region by this name. Kalidasa in his Meghaduta (Purvamegha, 24-25) mentioned the city of Vidisha as the capital of Dasharna. Other important cities of this janapada were Erakina and Erikachha. According to the Mahabharata, the queen of king Virabahu or Subahu of Chedi kingdom and the queen of king Bhima of Vidarbha (the mother of Damayanti) were daughters of the king of Dasharna.

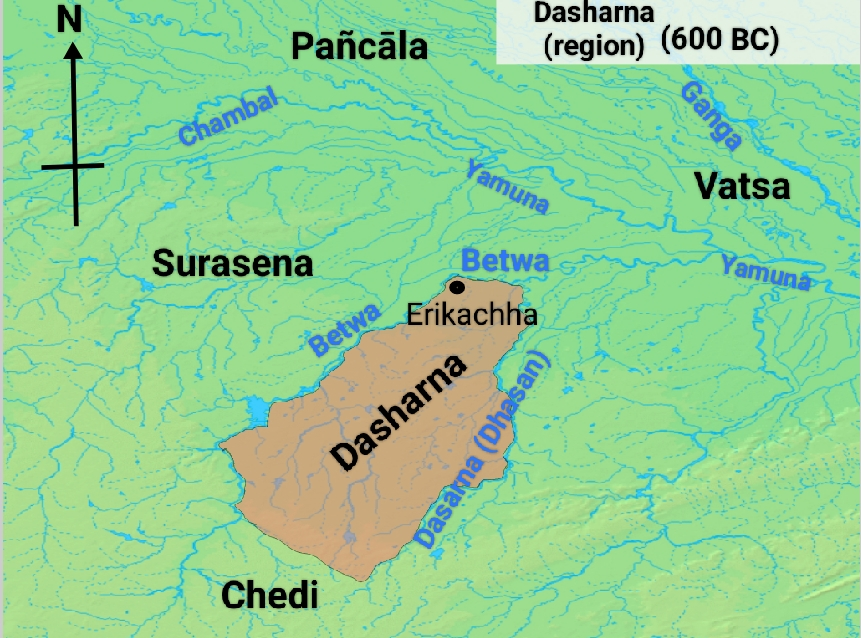
Dasharna historical region

== King Ashadhamitra of Dasharna ==
A brick inscription from Erich, which commemorates the excavation of a tank, informs us about a king of Dasharna, Ashadhamitra as well as his ancestors. In this inscription, Ashadhamitra, who styled himself as a Senapati is named as the son of Senapati Mulamitra (who was also the king of Dasharna), the grandson of Senapati Aditamitra and the great-grandson of Senapati Shatanika. Recently, a coin of Ashadhamitra has been discovered where he described himself as an Amatya and the king of Dasharna.
