= Zahidiyya =

Sufi order

- Founded: 13th century CE
- Founder: Shihabuddin Kabir Zahidi (Imam of Kaaba)
- Founded at: Mecca
- Type: Sufi order
- Region served: India (Meerut, Delhi, Bihar, Bengal)
- Official language: Arabic, Persian, Urdu
- Key people: Badruddin Badre Alam Zahidi, Fakhruddin Khudadad Zahidi, Shihabuddin Haqq-go Shahid Zahidi, Shah Sultan Zahidi
- Affiliations: Sunni Islam, Sufism

The Zāhidiyya (Urdu: زاہدیہ) or the Zahidi order (Urdu: سلسلۂ زاہدیہ) is a Sufi order and hereditary spiritual lineage that traces its silsila (spiritual chain) from Abu Ishaq of Kazerun to Junayd of Baghdad. The order was introduced into the Indian subcontinent by Shihabuddin Kabir Zahidi (d. 658 AH / 1260 CE), known as the Imam of the Kaaba in Mecca, who later migrated to Meerut along with his son Fakhruddin Khudadad Zahidi.

== History ==
According to the Ma'arif journal (Azamgarh, 1963), Fakhruddin Khudadad Zahidi was among the early preachers of Islam in northern India. His son, Shihabuddin Haqq-go Shahid Zahidi, was invited to Delhi by Sultan Qutbuddin Mubarak Shah Khalji, who built a Khanqah for him. Both Sultan Qutbuddin and Sultan Ghiyath al-Din Tughluq were among his devotees.

According to the Persian text of Akhbar al-Akhyar by Abd al-Haqq al-Dehlawi, Shihabuddin Haqq-go (son of Fakhruddin Khudadad Zahidi) was called “Haqq-go” (“truth-speaker”) because when Sultan Muhammad bin Tughluq ordered that people address him as “Muhammad ʿĀdil” (the Just), the Shaykh refused and replied, "We cannot call oppressors just." The Sultan ordered that he be thrown from the Delhi Fort, where he died. His grave is said to be below the fort.

== Expansion in Bengal and Bihar ==
In Bengal and Bihar, the Zahidiyya spread through Badruddin Badre Alam Zahidi, a contemporary of Makhdoom-ul-Mulk Bihari. He arrived in Bengal around 740 AH during the reign of Sultan Fakhruddin Mubarak Shah and later settled in Chittagong, from where he propagated Islam across eastern Bengal, Arakan, Burma, and Tripura. According to Muhammad Ishaq's 1962 article in the Journal of the Asiatic Society of Pakistan (Dhaka), Badr Alam was respected by Muslims, Buddhists, and Hindus, who built places of worship called "Badr Makān" in his name.

Badr Alam’s descendants included Shah Shihabuddin Qital Zahidi, Shah Abu Sa‘id Zahidi, and Shah Sultan Zahidi, who are buried in Bihar. The family remained influential in Bihar Sharif and its surrounding regions.

== Later development ==
During the reigns of the Delhi Sultans, several members of the Zahidiyya lineage were respected. Sikandar Lodi was impressed by Fakhruddin Zahidi of Bihar and reportedly said that "no contemporary equals him." In Bengal, Sultan Alauddin Husain Shah was a disciple of the Zahidi family, while his son Sultan Ghiyasuddin Azam Shah adopted the epithet ‘Abd al-Badr’ in honor of Badruddin Badre Alam Zahidi and inscribed it on his coins.

According to Nuzhat al-Khawatir, members of the family such as Fakhruddin Zahidi, Shihabuddin Haqq-go Zahidi, and Badruddin Bihari were scholars and Sufis active in Delhi, Meerut, and Bihar.

Bibi Abdal Zahidi, daughter of Badr Alam, was also known for piety, and her descendants were called "Abdalis."

== Legacy ==
The Zahidiyya established khanqahs in Meerut, Bihar Sharif, Saran district, and Ballia district. The shrines at Bihar Sharif (Chhoti Dargah), Saran (Chauki Qital), and Sheikhupur (Ruknuddin Zahidi) remain sites of veneration.

== See also ==
- Sufism in India
- Chittagong
- Bihar Sharif
- Darul Musannefin Shibli Academy
