= Dilawar Khan =

Sultan of Malwa from 1401 to 1406

- 'Amid Shāh Dā'ūd
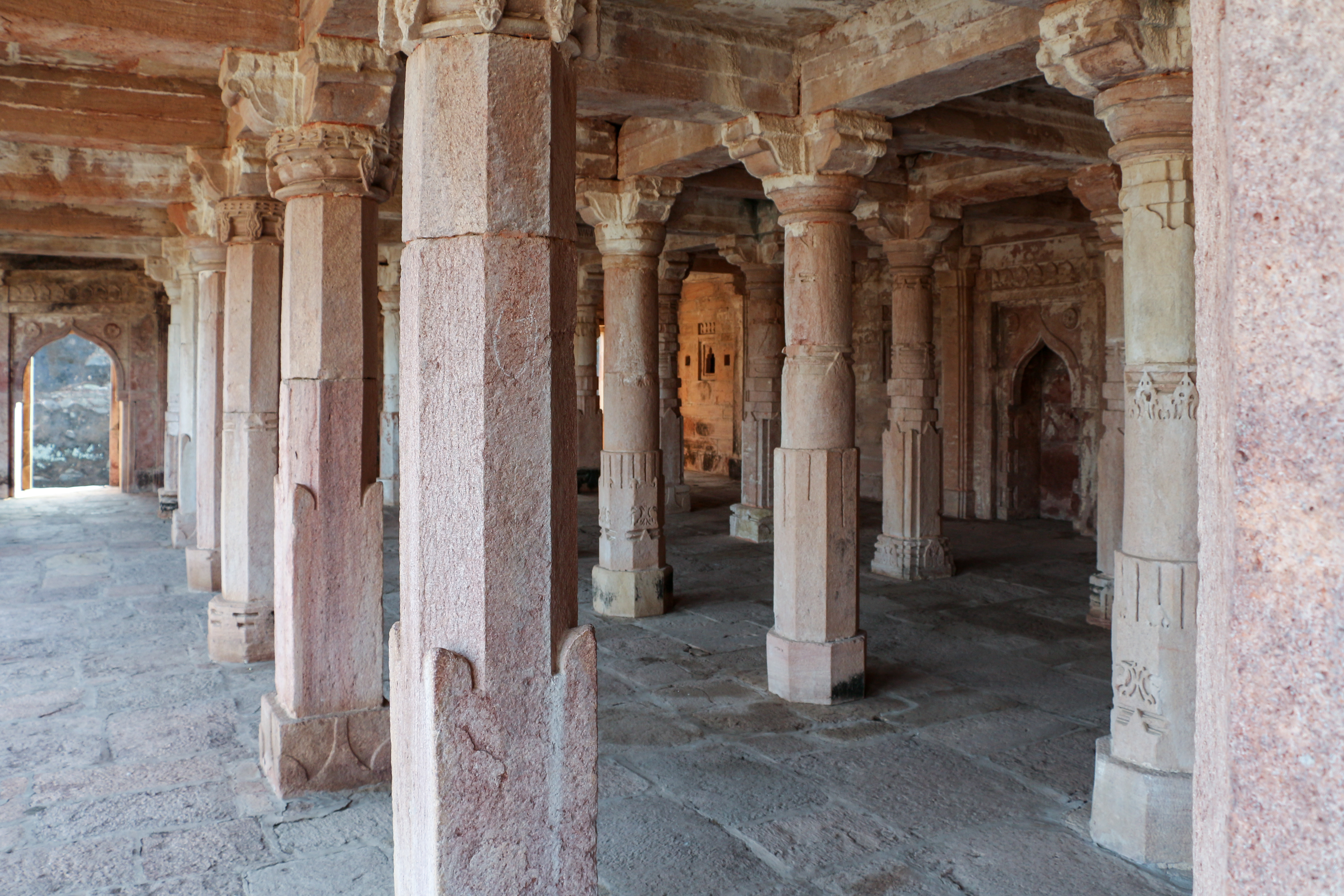

Sultan of Malwa
- Reign: 1401–1406
- Predecessor: Position established (himself as Governor of Malwa)
- Successor: Hoshang Shah

Governor of Malwa
- Reign: 1392–1401
- Predecessor: Post established
- Successor: Position abolished (himself as Sultan of Malwa)
- Died: 1406; Dhar, Malwa Sultanate (present-day Madhya Pradesh, India)
- Issue: Hoshang Shah; 2 daughters (Note: One married Qadir Shah, the Sultan of Kalpi and the other married Nasir Shah, the Sultan of Khandesh)
- Dynasty: Ghurid dynasty

Amid Shah Daud Dilawar Shah, (Note: Persian: عمید شاه داؤد دلاور شاه, Malvi: अमीद शाह दाउद दिलावर शाह) born Dilawar Khan, was an Afghan governor of the Malwa province of Central India appointed by the Delhi Sultan in 1392 and he later became the first Sultan of the Malwa Sultanate during the decline of the Delhi Sultanate. After serving at the court in Delhi, he was appointed governor at Dhar in A.H. 793/C.E. 1390–91. Dilawar Khan took the title of 'Amid Shāh Dā'ūd and caused the khutba to be read in his name in A.H. 804/C.E. 1401–02, declaring himself independent and establishing the Malwa Sultanate. He passed his kingdom – the Malwa Sultanate – to his son Hoshang Shah upon his death in A.H. 809/C.E. 1406.

Dilawar Khan was a follower of Firuz Shah Tughluq's son, Muhammad ibn Firuz, later known as Muhammad Shah. He was imprisoned by the court officials at Delhi for his support for the rebel prince. Not only Dilawar Khan, but many important provincial governors, such as that of Gujarat, and various other important and powerful nobles of the court supported the Prince's claim to the throne. After Timur's invasion in 1398, the same prince, who was the then Sultan of Delhi, ran away from the capital and sought shelter, first in the Gujarat Sultanate, but receiving a less than enthusiastic response there, moved to the Malwa Sultanate. Dilawar Khan is said to have welcomed him with open arms and told him that his Sultanate and treasure was all for the service of the Delhi Sultan. Dilawar Khan went to war with the Jaunpur Sultanate after its founder Malik Sarwar declared himself independent from Delhi however his forces were defeated and forced to retreat.
