= Abu Bakr Shah =

Sultan of Delhi from 1389 to 1390

Abu Bakr Shah Tughlaq

21st Sultan of Delhi
- Reign: 15 March 1389 – 31 August 1390
- Predecessor: Tughluq Khan
- Successor: Nasir ud din Muhammad Shah III
- Died: after 1390
- Dynasty: Tughlaq dynasty
- Father: Zafar Khan (son of Firuz Shah Tughlaq)
- Religion: Islam

Abu Bakr Shah Tughlaq (Persian: ابو بکر شاه; reigned 1389–1390) was a Muslim ruler of the Tughlaq dynasty. He was the son of Zafar Khan and the grandson of Sultan Feroze Shah Tughluq.

== Life ==
After Ghiyas-ud-Din Tughlaq II (who had succeeded Sultan Feroze Shah Tughluq) was murdered, Abu Bakr became ruler of the Tughlaq dynasty of the Delhi Sultanate. However, his uncle, Muhammad Shah, also desired to be ruler, and struggled against Abu Bakr over the control of the throne. Muhammad Shah attacked Delhi in August 1390 to claim the throne. Abu Bakr was defeated in August 1390, and Muhammad Shah succeeded him as king, reigning from 1390 to 1394. After his defeat, Abu Bakr was imprisoned in the fort of Meerut and died soon after.

Preceded by Ghiyas ud din Tughluq II	Sultan of Delhi; 1389–1390	Succeeded by Muhammad Shah ibn Firuz Shah Tughluq
