= Tughluq Khan =

Sultan of Delhi from 1388 to 1389

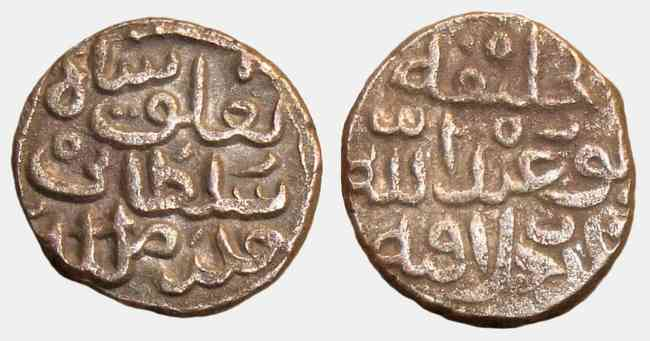
- Billon half tanka of Tughluq Khan

20th Sultan of Delhi
- Reign: 20 September 1388 – 20 February 1389
- Coronation: 21 September 1388
- Predecessor: Firoz Shah Tughlaq
- Successor: Abu Bakr Shah
- Wazir: Malikzada Firuz
- Born: Unknown
- Died: 20 February 1389; Delhi, Delhi Sultanate, now India
- Dynasty: Tughlaq dynasty
- Father: Fateh Khan
- Religion: Sunni Islam

Ghiyath al-Din Tughluq Shah II (Persian: غیاث الدین تغلق شاه دوم), born Tughluq Khan (Persian: تغلق خان), was a Sultan of the Tughlaq dynasty of the Delhi Sultanate. He succeeded his great-grandfather, Firoz Shah Tughlaq. Tughluq Shah II was the son of Fateh Khan and the grandson of Firuz Khan, oldest son and heir apparent of sultan Firoz Shah Tughlaq.

== Reign and life ==
He ascended to the throne in 1388. However, a succession crisis started almost immediately with Muhammad Shah ibn Firoz Shah staking his claim with the support of one of his nephews Abu Bakr Khan, the son of Zafar Khan. Tughluq Khan dispatched troops against his granduncle towards the foot of the hills of Sirmur. Muhammad Shah Tughlaq ibn Firoz Shah, after a brief battle, took shelter in the Fort of Kangra, and Tughluq Khan's army returned to Delhi without pursuing him any further due to the difficulties of the venture and terrain.

Eventually, some Umara joined Abu Bakr Khan, son of Zafar Khan and grandson of Sultan Firoz Shah Tughlaq, and plotted to assassinate Tughluq Khan. On 20 February 1389, they surrounded the Sultan and Malikzada Firuz, his vizier, and put them to death, hanging up their heads over the gate of the Delhi city. The duration of Tughluq Khan's reign was five months and eighteen days.

== See also ==
- Malikzada Firuz

Preceded by Sultan Feroze Shah Tughluq	Sultan of Delhi; 1388–1389	Succeeded by Sultan Abu Bakr Shah Tughluq
