= Phaphund =

- town
- Location in Uttar Pradesh, India
- Coordinates: 26.600°N 79.464°E
- Country: India
- State: Uttar Pradesh
- District: Auraiya

Government
  - Type: Nagar Panchayat
- Elevation: 133 m (436 ft)

Population (2001)
  - Total: 15,341

Hindi English Languages
  - Official: Hindi
- Time zone: UTC+5:30 (IST)
- Postal code: 206247

Phaphund is a town and a nagar panchayat in Auraiya district in the India state of Uttar Pradesh.

== Geography ==
Phaphund is located at 26.6°N 79.47°E. It has an average elevation of 133 metres (436 feet).

== History ==
Phaphund was listed in the Ain-i Akbari (c. 1595) as a mahal under sarkar Kannauj. It was listed with an assessed revenue of 5,432,391 dams and was expected to supply 2,000 infantry and 300 cavalry to the Mughal army.

== Demographics ==
As of 2001 India census, Phaphund had a population of 15,341. Males constitute 53% of the population and females 47%. Phaphund has an average literacy rate of 62%, higher than the national average of 59.5%: male literacy is 67%, and female literacy is 56%. In Phaphund, 18% of the population is under 6 years of age.
