= Muhammad Shah III =

Sultan of Delhi from 1390 to 1394

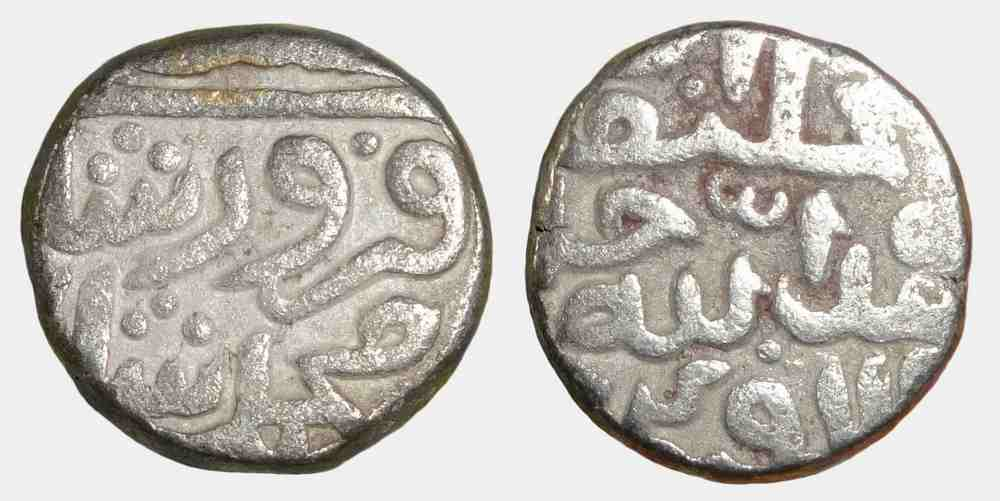
- 5/6 Billon Tanka of Muhammad bin Firoz, dated AH 794.

22nd Sultan of Delhi
- Reign: 31 August 1390 – 20 January 1394
- Predecessor: Abu Bakr Shah
- Successor: Ala ud-din Sikandar Shah
- Born: 17 June 1352
- Died: 20 January 1394 (aged 41); Delhi
- Issue: Ala ud-din Sikandar Shah; Nasir-ud-Din Mahmud Shah Tughluq
- Dynasty: Tughlaq
- Father: Firuz Shah Tughluq
- Religion: Islam

Nasir-ud-din Muhammad Shah III (Persian: محمد شاه; 17 June 1352 – 20 January 1394) was Sultan of Delhi from 1390 until 1394. He was a member of the Tughlaq dynasty.

== Life and reign ==
Born in 1352, the year after his father ascended the throne, prince Muhammad was the youngest son of Firuz Shah Tughlaq. During his father's late reign he became inimical with his father's vizier. Despite the vizier's concern Firuz gave him royal power and retired. However, soon after assuming royal titles, Muhammad became decadent, leading to widespread dissent and his deposition. Afterwards, his seventy-eight year old father was brought out of his harem in a palanquin and declared sultan again, and this time the old sultan declared his great-grandson, Tughluq Khan, a grandson of Muhammad's oldest brother Firuz Khan, heir apparent and Prince Muhammad fled from Delhi to Samana. However, Firuz died soon after, and Tughluq Khan became Ghiyasuddin Tughluq II, but this led to another civil war and his cousin and a grandson of Firuz, prince Abu Bakr taking the throne.

However, Muhammad Shah as his uncle was opposed to him, and struggled against Abu Bakr over the control of the throne. In August 1390, he launched an attack on Delhi and battled Abu Bakr Khan for the throne of Delhi. Eventually Abu Bakr was defeated, and Muhammad Shah succeeded him as king, reigning from 1390 to 1394. After Abu Bakr's defeat, Muhammad Shah imprisoned him in the fort of Meerut where he died soon after.

Muhammad Shah had to face constant rebellions. Uddharan and Sumer, two of his Hindu chiefs rebelled in Etawa. In response, the sultan took the field in 1391 and razed the city to the ground. He also built a fortress near Jalesar, naming it Muhammadabad. His oldest son and crown prince Humayun Khan helped him in putting down rebellions. While preparing for a punitive expedition, Muhammad Shah died in 1394.

Preceded by Sultan Abu Bakr Shah Tughluq	Sultan of Delhi; 1390 – 1394	Succeeded by Nasir-ud-Din Mahmud Shah Tughluq
