= Kalpi =

Historical City in Uttar Pradesh, India

Kalpi Kalpriya
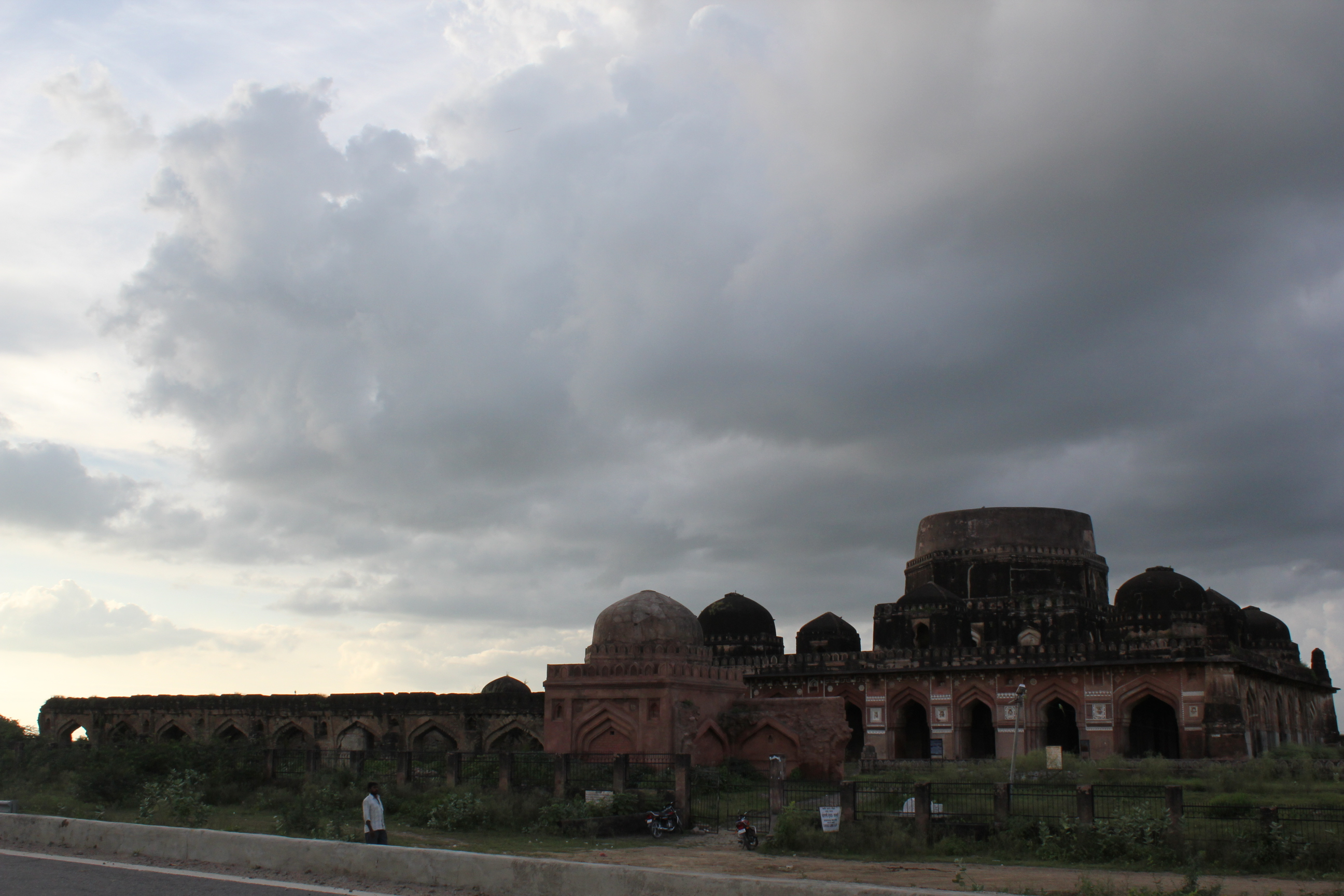
- South facing view of Chaurasi Gumbad

- Location within Uttar Pradesh Location within India
- Coordinates: 26.12°N 79.73°E
- Country: India
- State: Uttar Pradesh
- District: Jalaun
- Established: recaptured by Delhi Sultanate
- Founder: Vasu Dev (Rajput monarch of Kanauj)

Government
  - Type: Municipality
  - Body: Nagar Palika Parishad
  - Chairman: Baikunthi Devi
- Elevation: 112 m (367 ft)

Population (2011)
  - Total: 51,670

Languages
  - Official: Hindi
- Time zone: UTC+5:30 (IST)
- PIN: 285204
- Vehicle registration: UP 92
- Website: up.gov.in

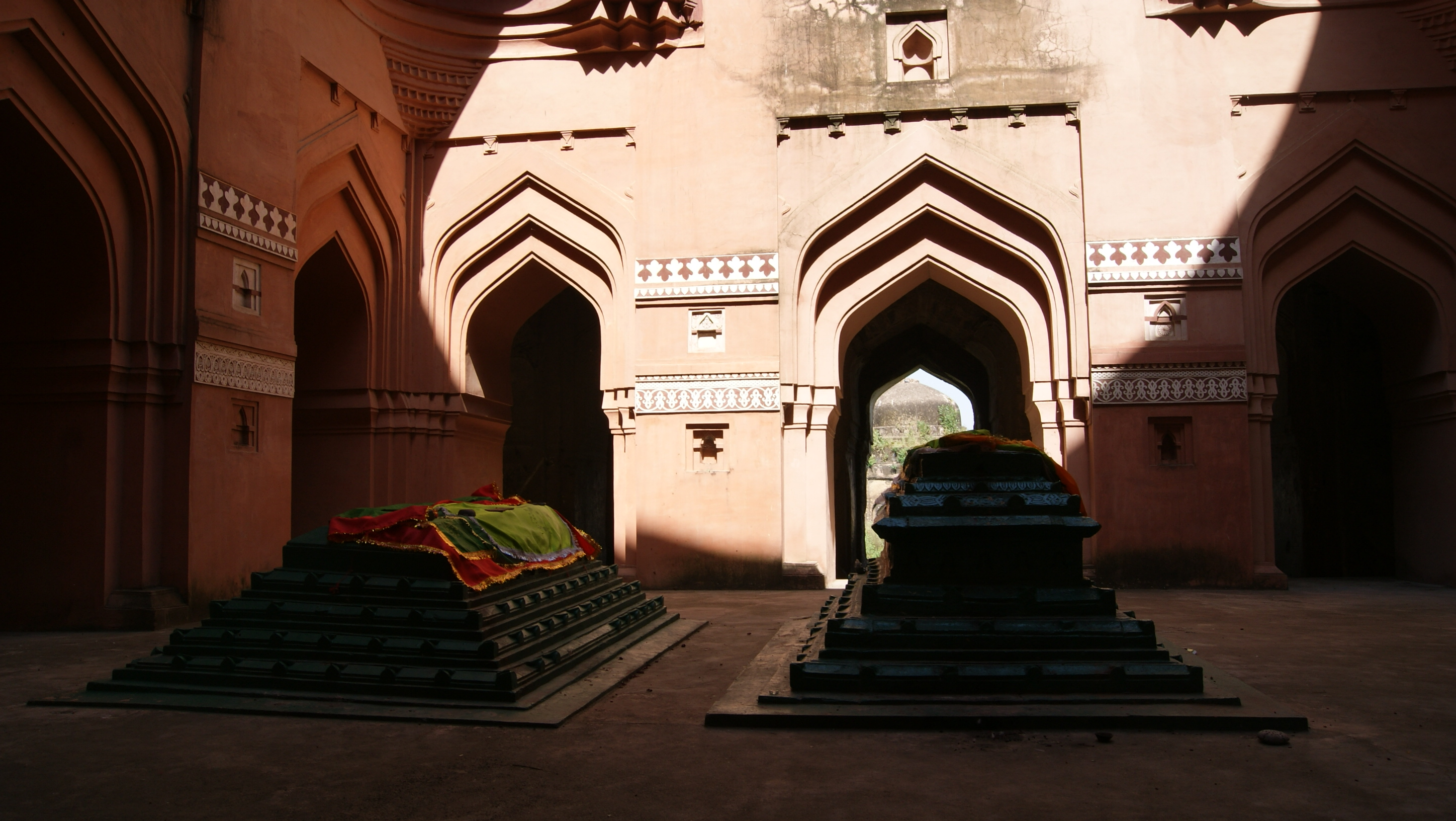
The historical Chaurasi Gumbad built during Lodhi Sultanate

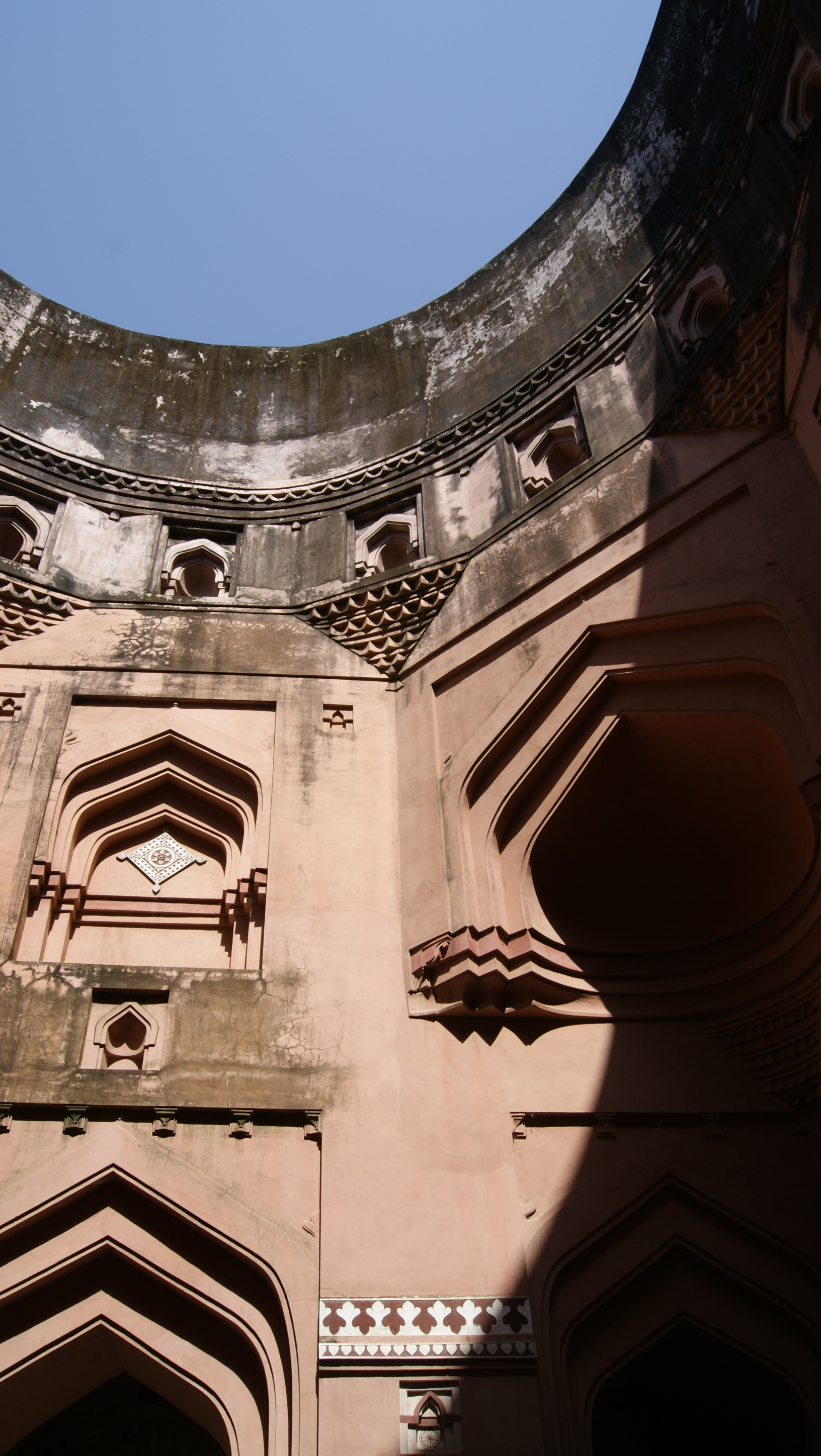
The part of circular dome of Chaurasi Gumbad

Kalpi is a historical city and municipal board in Jalaun district in Uttar Pradesh, India. It is on the right bank of the Yamuna. It is situated 78 kilometres south-west of Kanpur from which it is connected by both road and rail.

== History ==
The ancient name of Kalpi was Kalapriya.

=== Paleolithic ===
Lithics and fauna from the Middle Paleolithic of Kalpi have been described, aged at around 45,000 ka. These tools consist of diminutive quartzite choppers, possible manuports, cores, atypical points, scrapers, and debitage; bone tools include end-scrapers, points, notched tools, burins, and atypical end scrapers in greater abundance than their stone counterparts. They exhibit evidence of charring, suggesting fire usage.

=== Medieval ===
Kalapriya was an important tirtha dedicated to Surya. Skanda Purana and Samba Purana state about the existence of a shrine to Surya that had been consecrated by Krishna's son, Samba, alongside those in Multan and Konark. The Rastrakuta king Indra III sacked the city, including the temple, while on his Kannauj expedition, as it was under the rule of his enemy, the Pratihara king Mahipala I.

In 1196, it fell to Qutb-ud-din Aibak, the viceroy of Mohammed Ghori, and during the subsequent Muslim period it played a significant part in the history of central India. In the early 16th-century Rajput king of Chittor Rana Sanga defeated Ibrahim Lodhi twice and establish his control over some parts of Uttar Pradesh including Kalpi and Chandawar and appointed Manik Chand Chauhan to rule there. Rana Sanga also died in Kalpi in January 1528 poisoned by his own Nobles. The city was then captured by the Mughals under Babur. During Akbar's reign, Kalpi was a governor's seat and had a mint for copper coinage. The witty Raja Birbal of Akbar's court is considered to be born near this city. About the middle of the 18th century the city was lost by the Mughals and it passed into the hands of the Marathas.

=== Modern ===
The town was captured by the British in 1803, and after 1806 remained in British possession until India's independence in 1947. Kalpi was a part of Bundelkhand Agency, formed in 1811, and also housed its headquarters from 1818 to 1824. During this period the political agent to Governor General of India was appointed and headquartered in Kalpi. The British East India Company made it one of their principal stations for providing "commercial investment". In May 1858 Hugh Rose (Lord Strathnairn) defeated here a force of Indian rebels led by the Rani of Jhansi. The fortified post of Kalpi, the former residence of the rulers of Jalaun State, was dismantled in 1860 by the British and its place was taken by a market known as Whiteganj.

== Geography ==
Kalpi is located at 26.12°N 79.73°E. It has an average elevation of 112 metres (367 feet).The climate in Kalpi is warm and temperate. The rainfall in Kalpi is significant, with precipitation even during the driest month. The temperature averages 25.9 °C. The average annual rainfall is 892 mm.

== Location ==
The old town, which is on the Yamuna river has the ruin of a fort, and several temples of interest, while in the neighborhood are many ancient tombs. The Gaud Sarasawath Brahmin (GSB) community who are followers of Kashi Math Samsathan Varanasi has set up a temple of Shri Bala Veda Vyasa in memory of the great sage Veda Vyasa. In 1998 Sudhindra Thirtha, the swami of Kashi Math Samsthan, envisioned setting this temple right at the birthplace of Veda Vyasa. It is also a tourist attraction.

== Economy ==
Kalpi is still a centre of local trade (principally in grain, ghee and cotton) with a station on the North Central Railway (India) line from Jhansi to Kanpur, which crosses the Yamuna here. In late 1970s and early 1980s, Kalpi was one of the areas in central India affected by dacoits, and was frequented by the much dreaded Phoolan Devi gang. It has been declared an industrial belt by the Government of India and handmade paper is produced there.

== Transport ==
Railways

Kalpi is a major Railway Station of Kanpur-Jhansi railway section of North Central Railway.

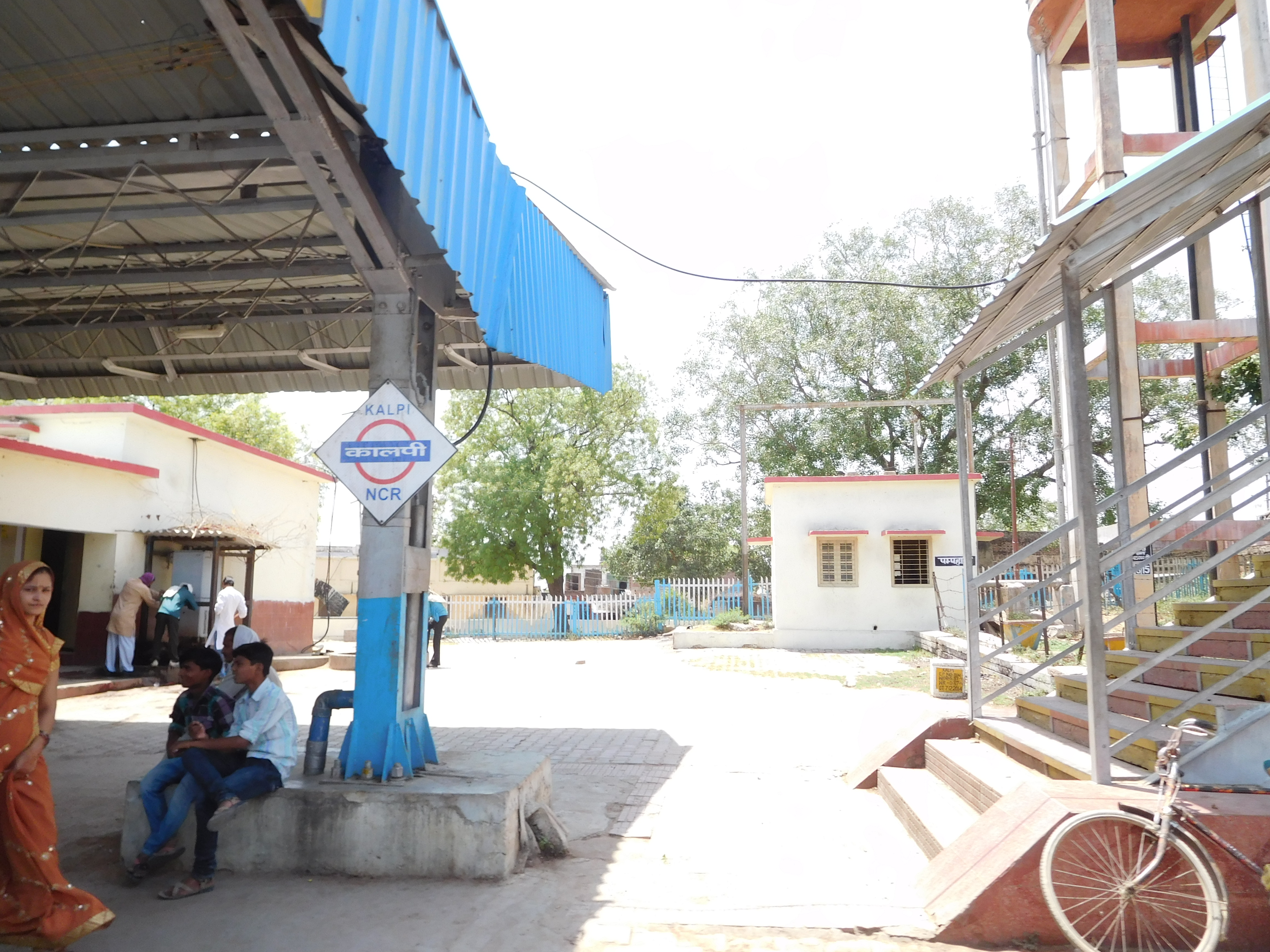
Kalpi Railway Station (Platform)

Roadways

Kalpi lies on NH 27 in the Kanpur-Jhansi section of the National Highway. It is connected to the cities of Kanpur, Jhansi, and Orai by UPSRTC buses from the Kalpi bus station.

Airways

The nearest airport is at Kanpur near Chakeri (100 kilometres) which has direct flights to Delhi, Mumbai and Kolkata but is expected to be connected to major cities of India by 2021.

== Gallery ==
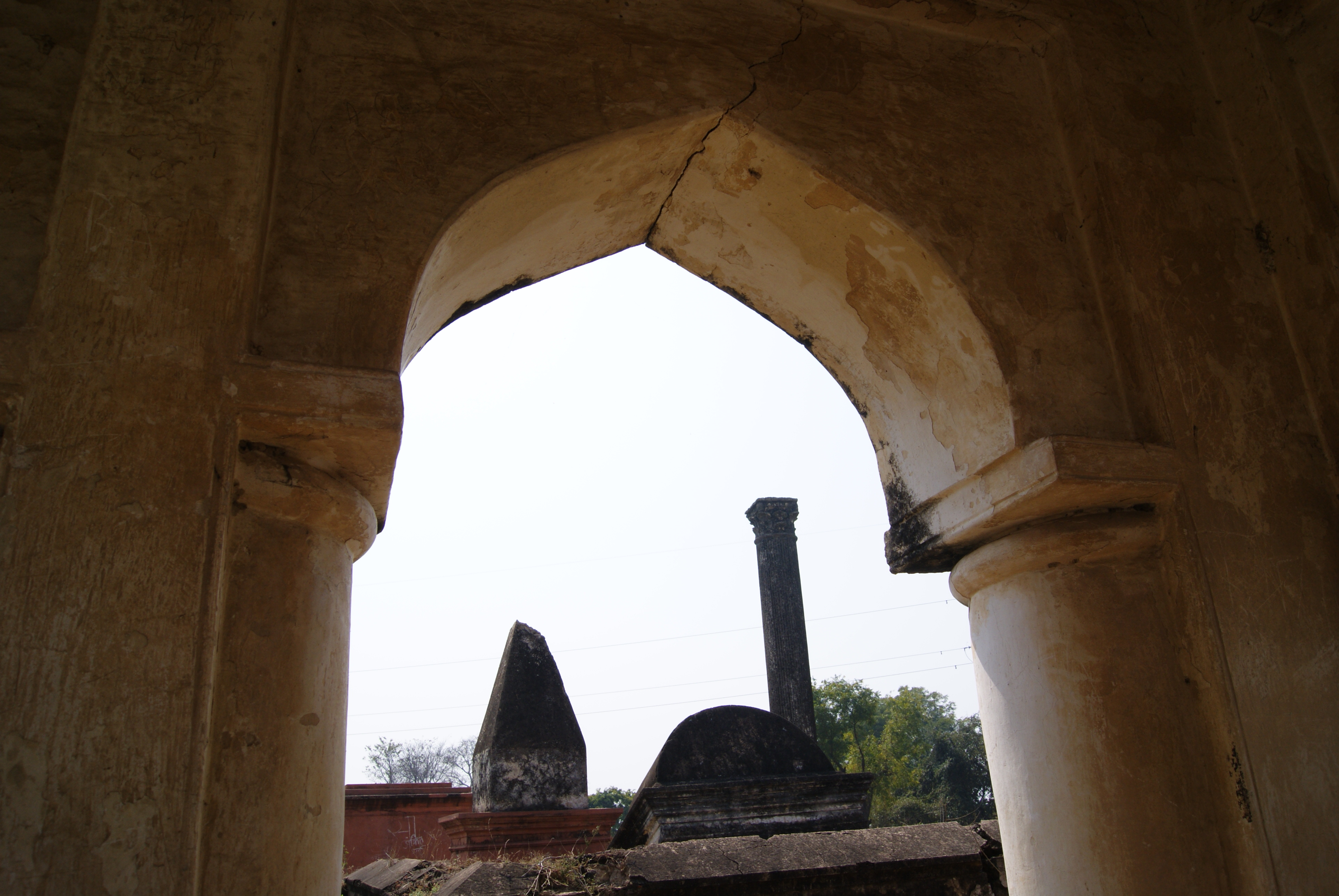
The British Memorial Cemetery on the banks of Yamuna River

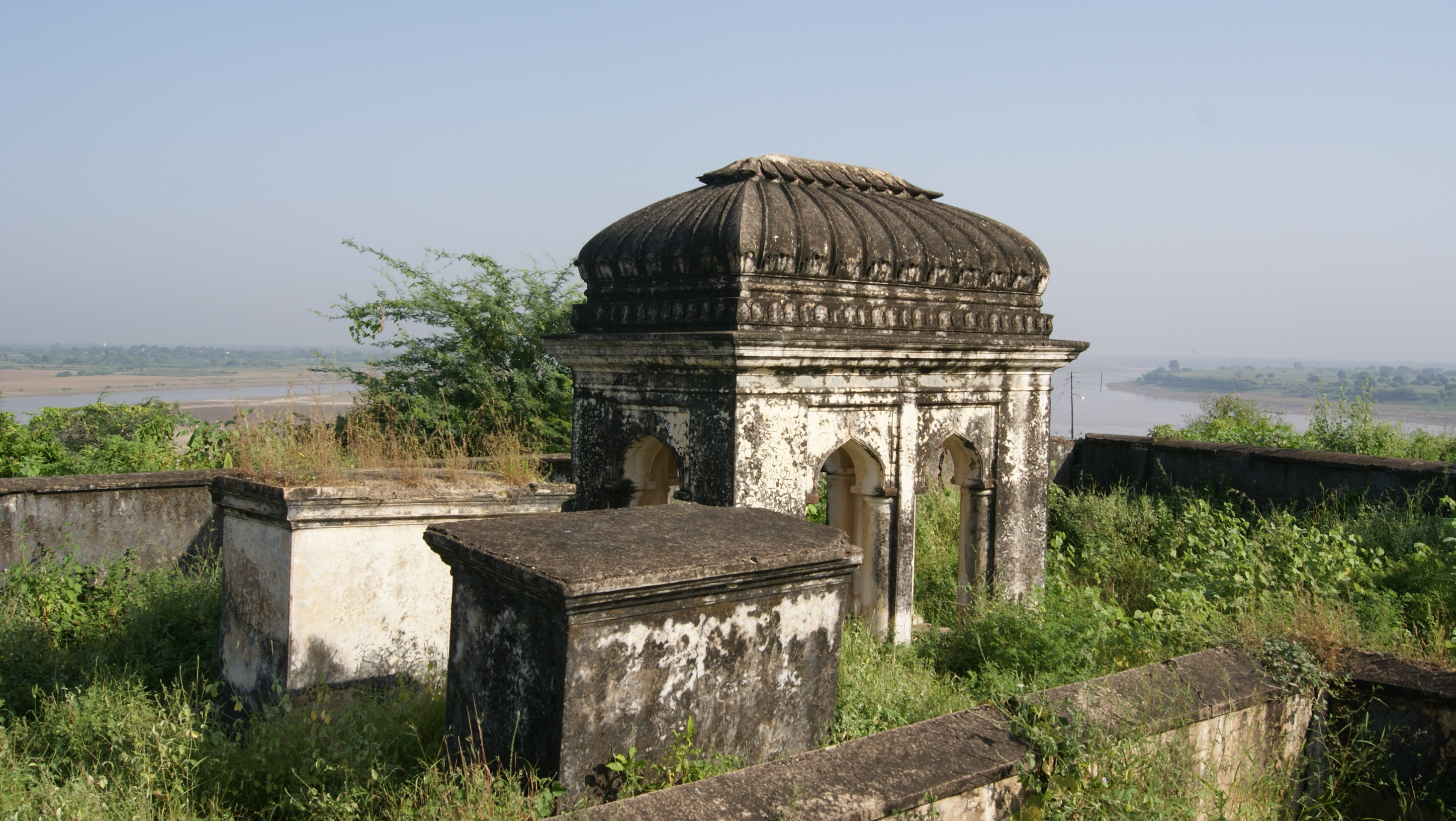
British Cemetery situated next to River Yamuna

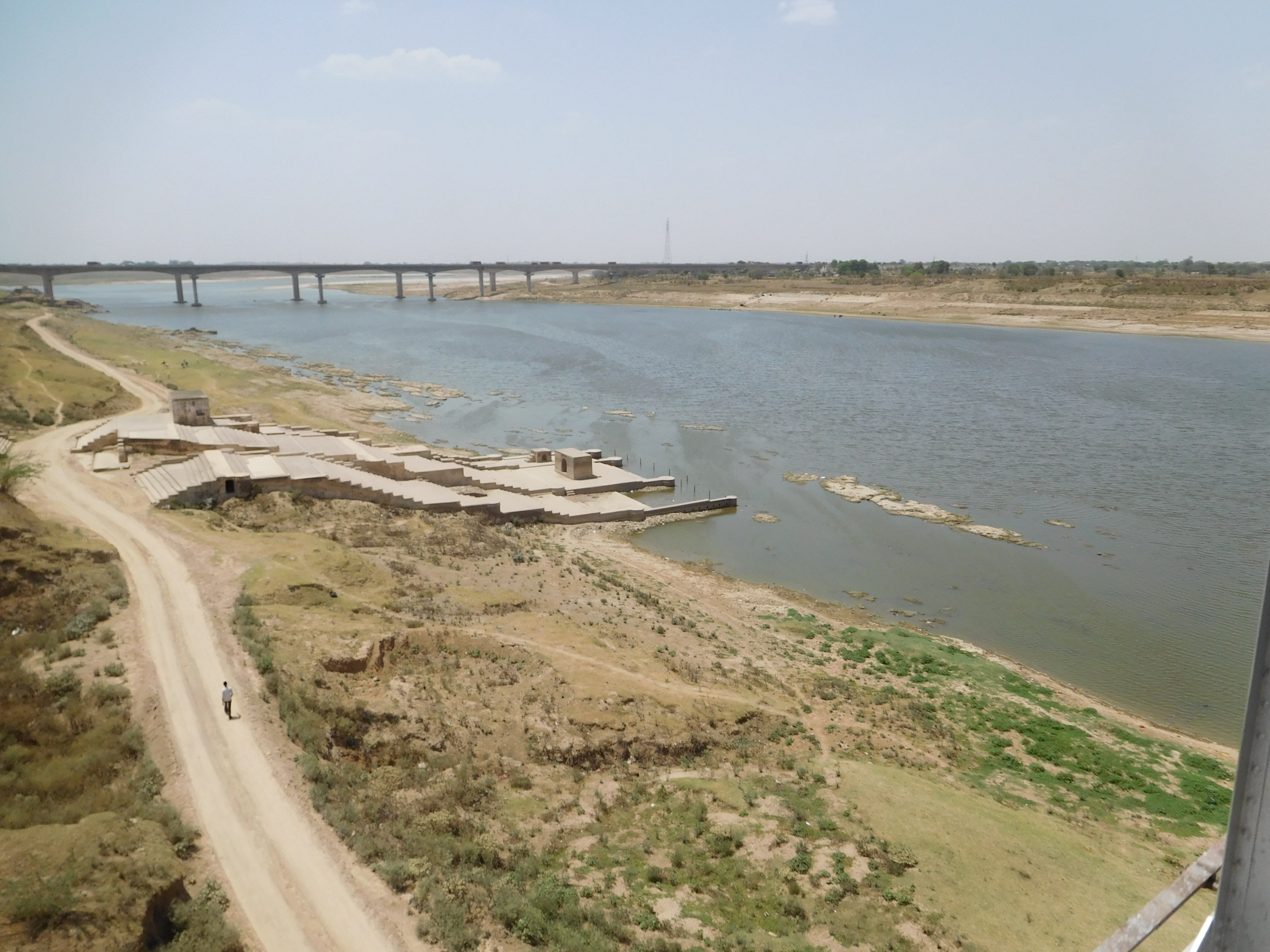
Yamuna River (road bridge)

== Bibliography ==
- Gopinath Sharma (1954). Mewar & the Mughal Emperors (1526-1707 A.D.). S.L. Agarwala.
