= K. A. Nizami =

Indian historian and diplomat

K.A. Nizami
- Born: 5 December 1925; Amroha, United Provinces, British India
- Died: 4 December 1997 (aged 71); Aligarh, Uttar Pradesh, India
- Education: University of Agra
- Spouse: Razia Nizami
- Children: Ahtisham Ahmed Nizami, Azra Nizami, Wajih Nizami, Mujib Ahmed Nizami, and Farhan Nizami

Khaliq Ahmad Nizami (5 December 1925 – 4 December 1997) was an Indian historian and diplomat.

== Early life and education ==
Nizami was born in Amroha, United Provinces, British India. He completed his M.A. in history in 1945, from Meerut College, then affiliated to the University of Agra. He was awarded the LL.B. degree by the same university.

== Career ==
=== Academic ===
Nizami joined Aligarh Muslim University, in the Department of History, in 1947 where he worked as a professor for several years, and later served as the Vice-Chancellor from 3 January 1974 until 30 August 1974. He was also the Dean of the Department of History from 3 July 1977 until 30 July 1980. The K. A. Nizami Centre for Quranic Studies at the university is named after him.

=== Diplomatic ===
Nizami was India's ambassador to Syria from 1975 to 1977.

== Works ==
- On History and Historians of Medieval India
- Royalty in Medieval India
- The Life & Times of Shaikh Nizam-u'd-din Auliya
- The life and times of Shaikh Farid-ud-din Ganj-i-Shakar
- Some Aspects of Religion And Politics in India During The 13th Century
- Medieval India: A Miscellany

== See also ==
- Aligarh Muslim University
- List of Aligarh Muslim University alumni
