= Erich, Uttar Pradesh =

Erich Erach
- Town
- Location in Uttar Pradesh, India Erich (India)
- Coordinates: 25°47′07″N 79°05′28″E
- Country: India
- State: Uttar Pradesh
- District: Jhansi

Population (2001)
  - Total: 8,523

Languages
  - Official: Hindi
- Time zone: UTC+5:30 (IST)
- PIN: 284302
- Telephone code: 05171
- Vehicle registration: UP-93
- Website: up.gov.in

Erich is a town and a nagar panchayat in Jhansi district in the state of Uttar Pradesh, India. In ancient period it was known as Erikachha or Erakachha and according to a Buddhist text, the Petavatthu it was one of the major cities of the Dasanna janapada.

== History ==
The names of a number of rulers of Erich during the post-Maurya period are found from the coins issued by them. They are Sahasamitra, Ishvaramitra, Sahasrasena, Mitrasena, Amitasena and Maha (sena?).

At the time of the Mughal emperor Akbar, Erich was the seat of a sarkar in Agra Subah. It also formed a constituent mahal of the sarkar. The sarkar of Erich covered all of today's Jhansi district and much of the former Orchha State. How far south it extended is unclear, but it probably bordered the sarkar of Kannauj (or Garha Mandla) in Malwa subah. The mahal of Erich was mostly in today's Jhansi district and also included parts of what is now Jalaun district and what used to be Samthar State.

There are many historical structures in Erich that date from this period of importance. Its old fort is of Muslim construction with a small part near the river representing the original structure. In the fort is the jama masjid (congregational mosque), which was built in 815 AH (1413 CE) by Ghazi Zia-ud-Din, the brother of the jagirdar under Mahmud Shah. Later additions were made during the reign of Aurangzeb. The mosque structure consists of several small domes clustered around the large central dome, each one supported by massive columns. Outside, there are cloisters with similar pillars. The mosque's walls and arches are made out of stone and brick, and feature red, blue, yellow, and green detailing.

The old city walls, now in ruins, were probably built during the reign of Akbar, when the Rairavan besieged and captured the city (where Bir Singh Deo had taken refuge after assassinating Abu'l-Fazl). The walls themselves are built from large stones with no mortar. Along the walls are five gates, with inscriptions on two of them bearing the date 1055 AH, or 1645 CE. Beyond the walls, in the historical suburbs, there are the remains of numerous mosques and mausoleums which, like the fort and jama masjid.

Erich came under Bundela control during the 17th century, and it appears to have changed hands several times between them and the Mughals in the following years. By 1757, Erich had come under Maratha control, and then it became part of Jhansi State until its annexation by the British.

In the early 20th century, Erich's marketplace was described as mostly dealing in agricultural produce and locally produced textiles, with the main cloth items being chintz and chunaris (i.e. head-and-shoulder coverings worn by women, often dyed red or yellow with contrasting floral or spotted patterns).

== Demographics ==
As of 2001 India census, Erach had a population of 8,523. Males constitute 53% of the population and females 47%. Erach has an average literacy rate of 51%, lower than the national average of 59.5%: male literacy is 63%, and female literacy is 37%. In Erach, 17% of the population is under 6 years of age.
