= Gwalior Quran =

Qur'anic manuscript from 1399 CE

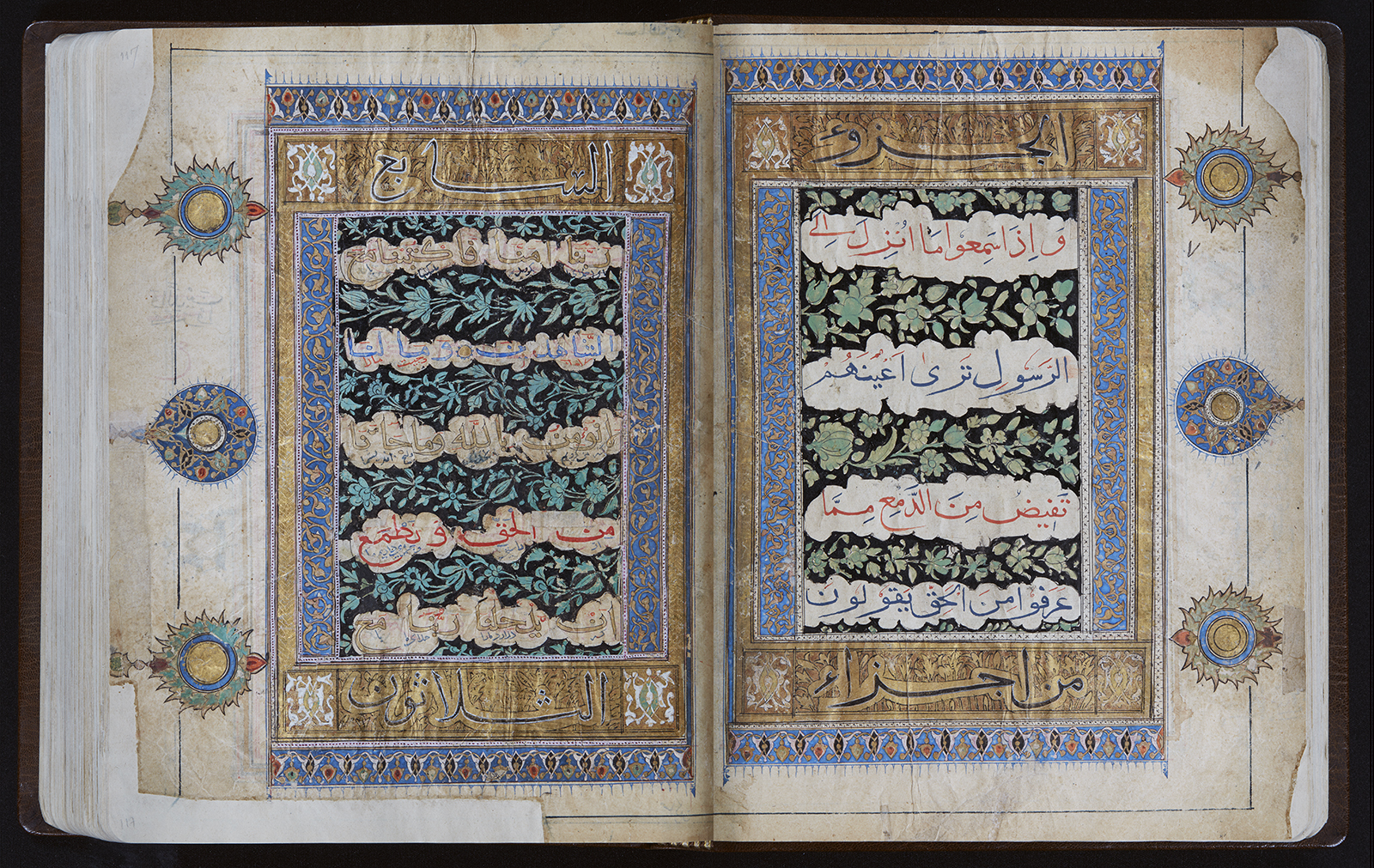
Double page from the Gwalior Qur'an

The Gwalior Qur'an is a Qur'anic manuscript or mushaf completed in 1399 in Gwalior Fort in the Delhi Sultanate in modern-day India. The manuscript is notably the oldest known illuminated Qur'anic manuscript from the Delhi Sultanate and the oldest known example of the Bihari script, a calligraphic style with contested origins, but is primarily seen in works from the Delhi Sultanate. It is also the oldest dated mushaf which includes a falnama, a section used for bibliomancy. It is currently on display at the Aga Khan Museum in Toronto, Canada.

== Origins ==
The colophon of the Gwalior Qur'an indicates that it was completed in 1399 in Gwalior Fort in Gwalior and copied by Mahmūd Sha’bān. Other than the information provided in the colophon, not much is known about the patronage or historical context surrounding the manuscript. According to Persian chronicles of the sultans of the Tughlaq dynasty of the Delhi Sultanate, Gwalior was occupied by the Hindu Tonwar dynasty.

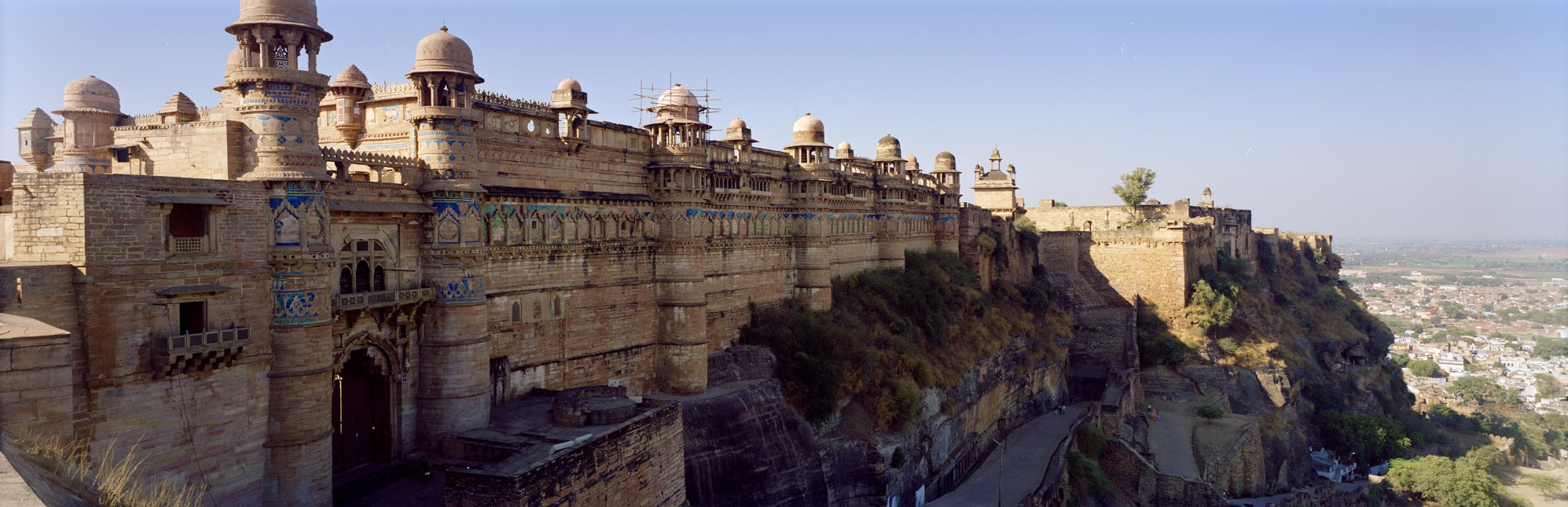
View of Gwalior Fort, 2009

However, some Persian hagiographical texts suggest that the manuscript was brought by Sufi shaykh Gisu Daraz who was fleeing from Timur’s 1398 sacking of Delhi, with it only being completed in Gwalior. While the precise chronology of the creation of the Gwalior Qur’an is unknown, the production and style of the mushaf was influenced by the trade routes and cultural exchanges between India, Iran, the Mamluks in Egypt, and other groups of the era along with stylistic influences from the masahif (Qur’anic manuscripts) of Ilkhanids and Ghurids.

== Formatting and style ==
The Gwalior Qur’an is currently composed of 550 folios, but it is estimated that the original volume had around 567 folios. The mushaf is currently measured to be 29 x 22 cm and the paper it was written on has a smooth and shiny finish. Most pages have thirteen lines of text except pages with special formatting at the beginnings of four suwar.

=== Text and calligraphy ===
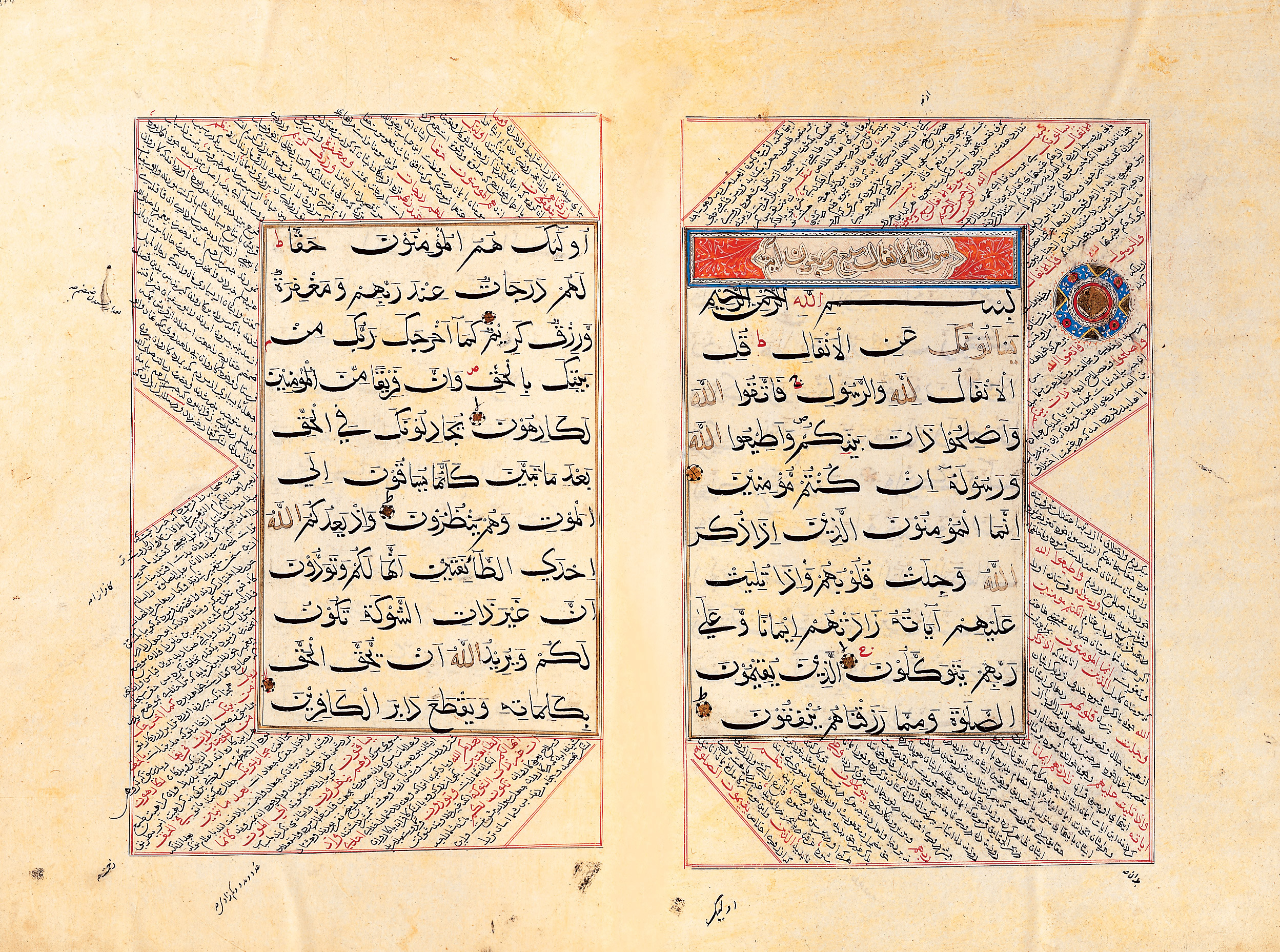
Qur’an from 16th century India in Bihari script with commentary in Persian.

The Gwalior Qur'an is the earliest dated Qur'an which uses the Bihari script. The script is characterized by long horizontal lines, shorter vertical lines, and large spaces between words. The script was primarily seen in copies of the Qur’an. Unlike many other manuscripts in the Bihari script, the Gwalior manuscript uses not black ink, but instead blue, red, and gold ink in its main body of text. The main lines of Arabic text are neatly spaced and alternate between blue, red, and gold with a Persian translation written in a smaller naskh script in between them.

Along with the use of Bihari script for the main text, scripts common elsewhere in the Islamic world were incorporated, such as the kufic and muhaqqaq scripts used for juz’ markers or thuluth script for sura headings. The use of these scripts shows the Ghurid influence in the style of the manuscript. In the margins of the manuscript, there are annotations with commentary on the reading or recitation of the Qur’an which are mostly written in red and blue ink, but with some which do use black ink.

=== Ornamentation ===
The manuscript is profusely decorated with medallions, botanical and arabesque elements, and geometric patterns. Before almost every juz’ (a division that is around one-thirtieth of the Qur’an) and four suwar, there are illuminated double frontispieces. However, the first double frontispiece is much more ornate than the others as it is decorated with stars and geometric patterns that are similar to designs in manuscripts made by the Ilkhanids in Iran and the Mamluks in Egypt in the 14th century. The similarities in ornamentation suggest a cultural link between the creators of the Gwalior Qur’an with other parts of the Islamic world.

== Divinatory use ==
The Gwalior Qur'an features a section at the end of the manuscript for bibliomancy, or foretelling the future by interpreting parts of sacred text, known as a Qur'anic falnama. The Gwalior Qur’an is regarded as the earliest known mushaf with a falnama. It is located on the six pages following the prayer or du’a that completes the Qur'an, and before the colophon.

The falnama at the end of the manuscript contains a gridded chart which attributes each letter of the Arabic alphabet with a prediction for the future. To find the letter, the reader starts by performing ritual ablutions, called wudu. The reader is instructed to recite certain suwar, prostrate oneself, and recite prayers. After that, the reader must open a random page in the Qur’an, then go back seven pages before finding the first letter of the seventh line on the page. It is unique in that the Qur'anic falnama addresses the reader directly, as opposed to other later examples of Qur'anic falnama which are typically written in third person.
