= Tughlaq dynasty =

Dynasty in South Asia from 1320 to 1413

Tughlaq تغلق तुगलुक
- 1320–1413
- Flag of the Tughlaq dynasty according to the contemporary Catalan Atlas (c. 1375).

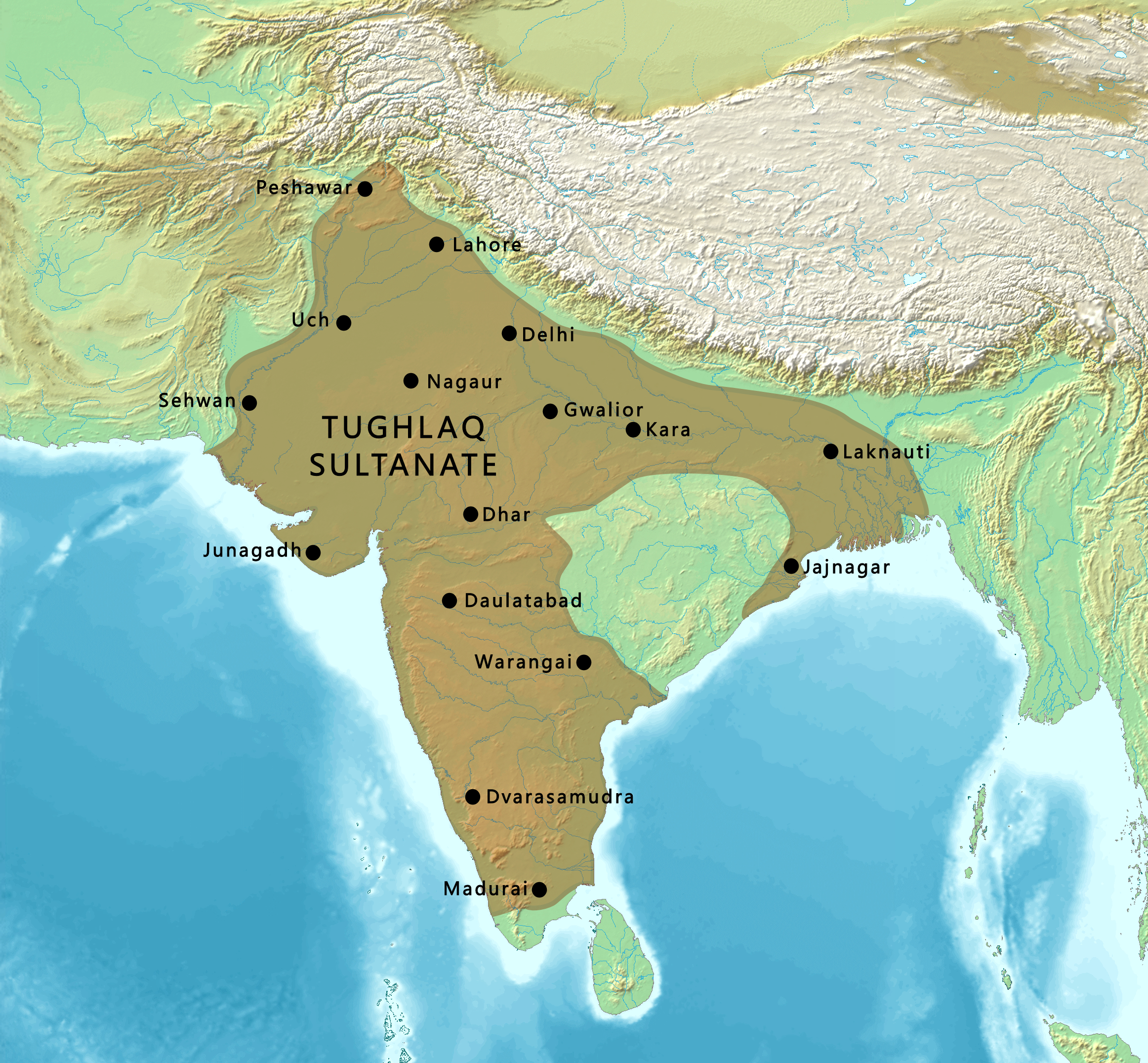
- Territory under the Tughlaq dynasty of the Delhi Sultanate, 1330–1335. The empire shrank after 1335.
- Capital: Delhi
- Common languages: Persian (official) Hindavi (Language of elites and lingua franca)
- Religion: Sunni Islam
- Government: Sultanate
- Sultan
  - 1320–1325: Ghiyath al-Din Tughluq
  - 1325–1351: Muhammad ibn Tughluq
  - 1351–1388: Firuz Shah Tughlaq
  - 1388–1413: Ghiyath-ud-din Tughluq Shah / Abu Bakr Shah / Muhammad Shah / Mahmud Tughlaq / Nusrat Shah
- Historical era: Medieval
  - Established: 8 September 1320
  - Disestablished: February 1413
- Currency: Taka
Preceded by
Khalji dynasty
Succeeded by
Sayyid dynasty
Bengal Sultanate
Vijayanagara Empire
Bahmani Sultanate
Malwa Sultanate
Khandesh Sultanate
Gujarat Sultanate
Jaunpur Sultanate
Kingdom of Mewar
- Today part of: India; Pakistan; Bangladesh

The Tughlaq dynasty was the third dynasty to rule over the Delhi Sultanate in the medieval Indian subcontinent. The dynasty came to power in 1320 when Ghazi Malik assumed the throne in Delhi under the title of Ghiyath al-Din Tughluq, and ended in 1413.

The Tughlaq dynasty reached its territorial zenith through the military campaigns led by Muhammad bin Tughluq between 1330 and 1335. It ruled most of the Indian subcontinent until its decline in the late 14th-century. After the disastrous invasion of Timur in 1398–99, the last Tughlaq sultan was eventually deposed by Khizr Khan, who went on to establish Sayyid dynasty.

== Origin ==
The etymology of the word Tughlaq is not certain. The 16th-century writer Firishta claims that it is an Indian corruption of the Turkic term Qutlugh, but this is doubtful. Literary, numismatic and epigraphic evidence makes it clear that Tughlaq was not an ancestral designation, but the personal name of the dynasty's founder Ghazi Malik. Historians use the designation Tughlaq to describe the entire dynasty as a matter of convenience, but to call it the Tughlaq dynasty is inaccurate, as none of the dynasty's kings used Tughlaq as a surname: only Ghiyath al-Din's son Muhammad bin Tughluq called himself the son of Tughlaq Shah ("bin Tughlaq").

The ancestry of Ghiayth al-Din is debated among modern historians because the earlier sources provide differing information regarding it. However, he is usually considered to be of Turko-Mongol or Turkic origins. Muhammad bin Tughlaq's court poet Badr-i Chach attempted to find a royal Sassanian genealogy for the sultan from the line of Bahram Gur, which seems to be the official position of the genealogy of Sultan Muhammad, although this can be dismissed as flattery.

The medieval historian Firishta states that Ghiayth al-Din's father was a Turco-Mongol slave of Balban while his mother was a Jat lady of Punjab, however this lacks confirmation from contemporary authorities.

Peter Jackson suggests that Ghiayth al-Din was of Mongol stock and a follower of the Mongol chief Alaghu. The Moroccan traveller Ibn Battuta stated with reference to the Sufi saint Rukn-e-Alam that he belonged to the "Qarauna" [Neguderi] tribe of Turks, who lived in the hilly region between Turkestan and Sindh, and were in fact Mongols.

== History ==
=== Rise to power ===
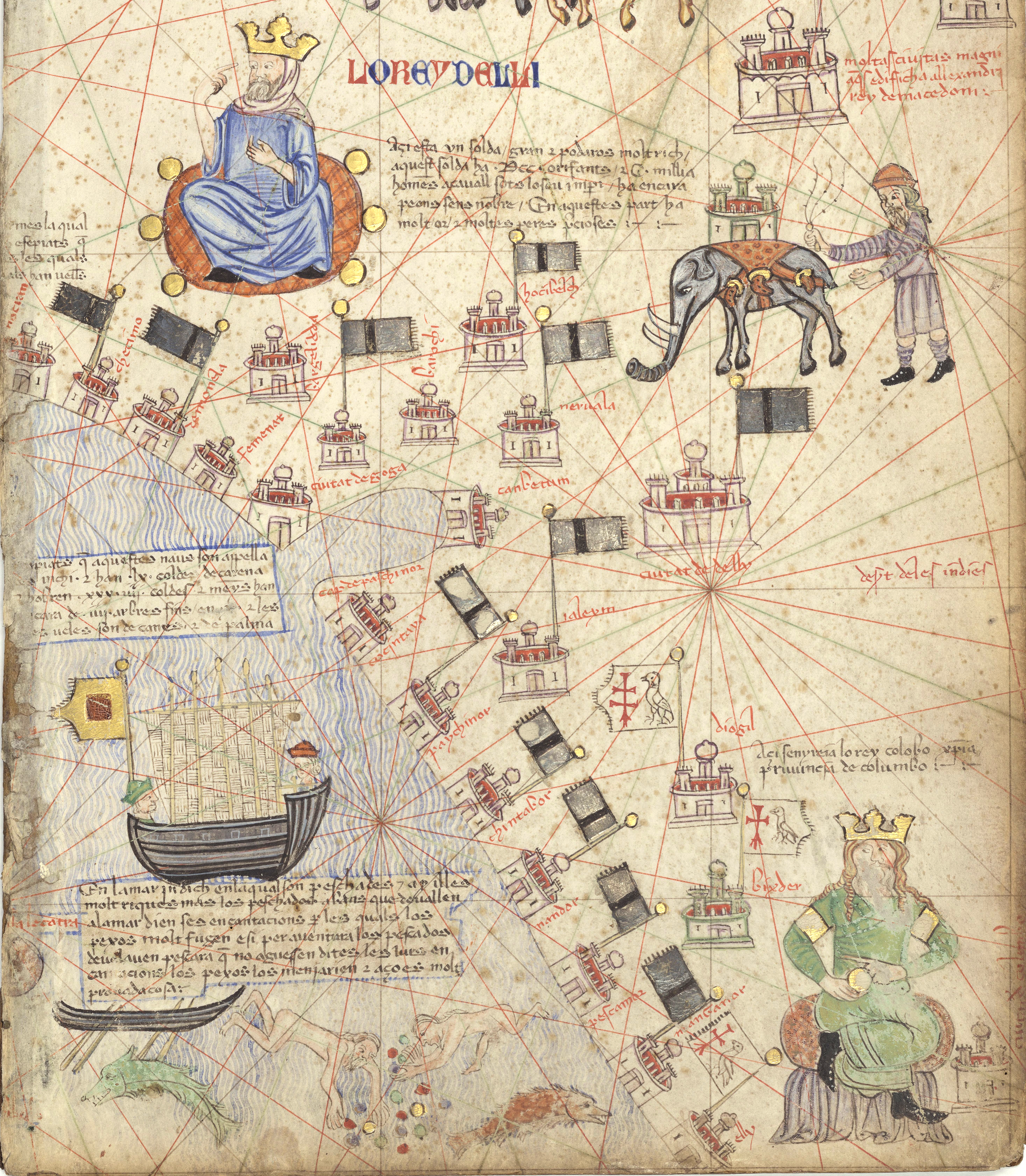
Sultan of Delhi (top, flag:) and the "King of Colombo" ruler of the city of Kollam (bottom, flag:, identified as Christian due to the early Saint Thomas Christianity there, and the Catholic mission under Jordan Catala since 1329), in the contemporary Catalan Atlas of 1375. The captions are informative, and several of the location names are accurate.

The Khalji dynasty ruled the Delhi Sultanate before 1320. Its last ruler, Khusro Khan, was a Hindu slave who had been forcibly converted to Islam and then served the Delhi Sultanate as the general of its army for some time.

After Alauddin Khalji's death from illness in 1316, a series of palace arrests and assassinations followed, with Khusro Khan coming to power in June 1320, after killing the licentious son of Alauddin Khalji, Mubarak Khalji, initiating a massacre of all members of the Khalji family and reverting from Islam. However, he lacked the support of the Muslim nobles and aristocrats of the Delhi Sultanate. Delhi's aristocracy invited Ghazi Malik, then the governor in Punjab under the Khaljis, to lead a coup in Delhi and remove Khusro Khan. In 1320, Ghazi Malik launched an attack and killed Khusro Khan to assume power.

=== Ghiyasuddin Tughlaq ===
After assuming power, Ghazi Malik renamed himself Ghiyasuddin Tughlaq – thus starting and naming the Tughlaq dynasty. He rewarded all those maliks, amirs and officials of Khalji dynasty who had rendered him a service and helped him come to power. He punished those who had rendered service to Khusro Khan, his predecessor. He lowered the tax rate on Muslims that was prevalent during Khalji dynasty, but raised the taxes on Hindus, wrote his court historian Ziauddin Barani, so that they might not be blinded by wealth or afford to become rebellious. He built a city six kilometres east of Delhi, with a fort considered more defensible against the Mongol attacks, and called it Tughlakabad.

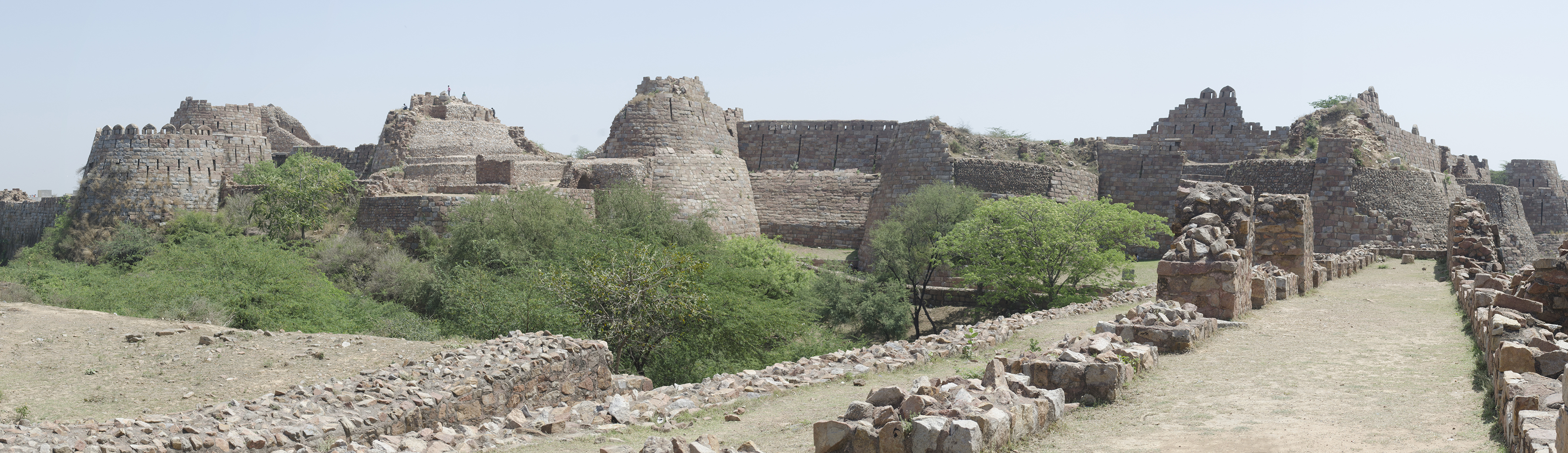
Ghiyasuddin Tughlaq ordered the construction of Tughlakabad, a city near Delhi with a fort, to protect the Delhi Sultanate from Mongol attacks. Above is the Tughlaq fort, now in ruins.

In 1321, he sent his eldest son Jauna Khan, later known as Muhammad bin Tughlaq, to Deogir to plunder the Hindu kingdoms of Arangal and Tilang (now part of Telangana). His first attempt was a failure. Four months later, Ghiyasuddin Tughlaq sent large army reinforcements for his son asking him to attempt plundering Arangal and Tilang again. This time Jauna Khan succeeded. After capturing Arangal in 1323, Juana Khan annexed the Kakatiya territory and renamed the city Sultanpur. During the occupation, Tughlaq forces demolished the Svayambhushiva temple—the dynastic state temple of Kakatiya dynasty—and erected a mosque on the site. All plundered wealth, state treasury and captives were transferred from the captured kingdom to Delhi Sultanate.

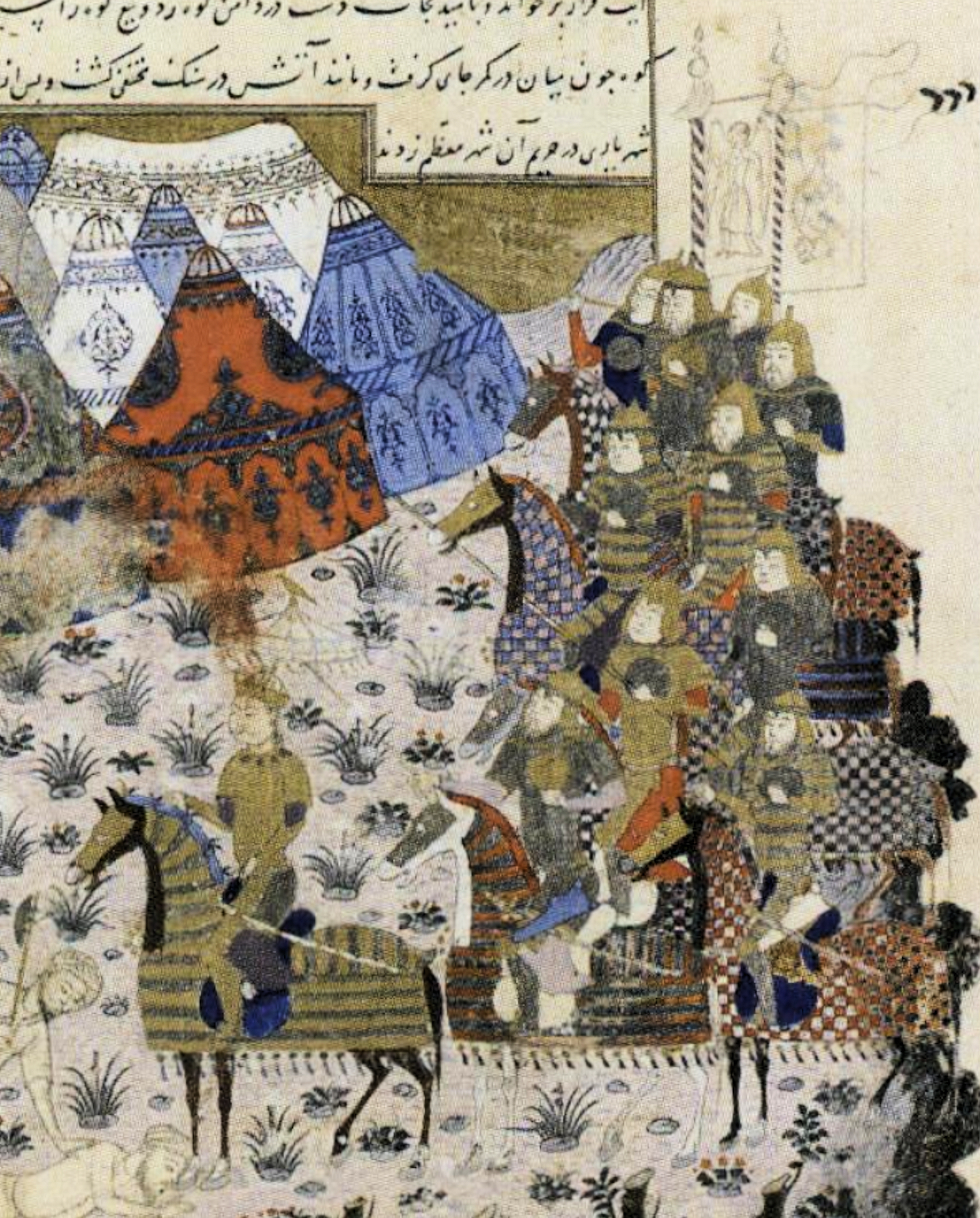
Ghiyath al-Din Tughluq leading his troops in the capture of the city of Tirhut, from the Basātin al-uns by Ikhtisān-i Dabir, a member of the Tughluq court. Ca.1410 Jalayirid copy of 1326 Tughlaq dynasty lost original. Istanbul, Topkapi Palace Museum Library, Ms. R.1032.

The Muslim aristocracy in Lakhnauti (Bengal) invited Ghiyasuddin Tughlaq to extend his coup and expand eastwards into Bengal by attacking Shamsuddin Firoz Shah, which he did over 1324–1325, after placing Delhi under control of his son Ulugh Khan, and then leading his army to Lukhnauti. Ghiyasuddin Tughlaq succeeded in this campaign. As he and his favourite son Mahmud Khan were returning from Lukhnauti to Delhi, Jauna Khan schemed to kill him inside a wooden structure (kushk) built without foundation and designed to collapse, making it appear as an accident. Historic documents state that the Sufi preacher and Jauna Khan had learnt through messengers that Ghiyasuddin Tughlaq had resolved to remove them from Delhi upon his return. Ghiyasuddin Tughlaq, along with Mahmud Khan, died inside the collapsed kushk in 1325, while his eldest son watched. One official historian of the Tughlaq court gives an alternate fleeting account of his death, as caused by a lightning bolt strike on the kushk. Another official historian, Al-Badāʾunī ʻAbd al-Kadir ibn Mulūk-Shāh, makes no mention of lightning bolt or weather, but explains the cause of structural collapse to be the running of elephants; Al-Badaoni includes a note of the rumour that the accident was pre-planned.

=== Patricide ===
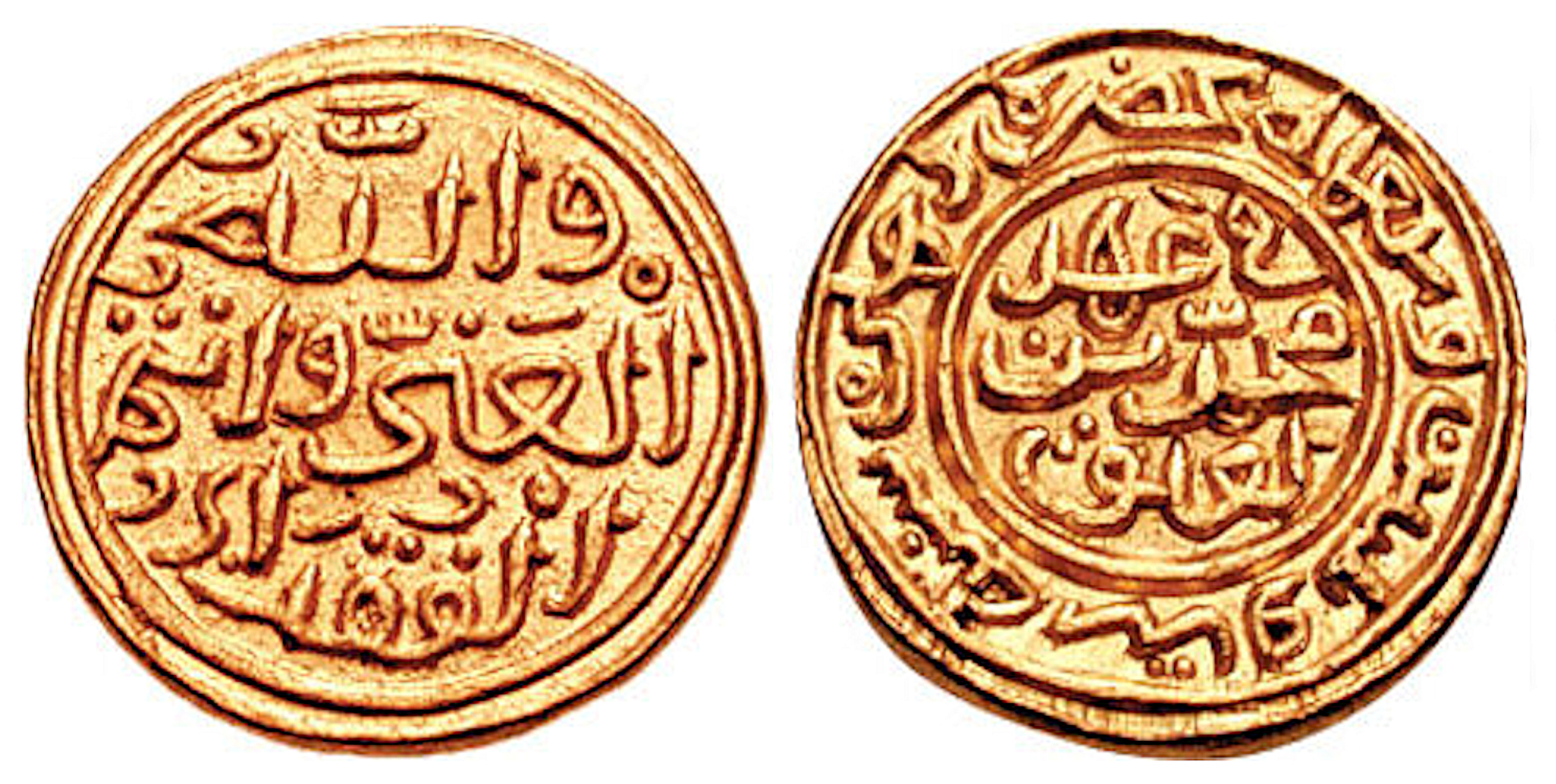
Gold coinage of Muhammad bin Tughluq (r. 1325–1351)

According to many historians such as Ibn Battuta, al-Safadi, Isami, and Vincent Smith, Ghiyasuddin was killed by his eldest son Jauna Khan in 1325. Jauna Khan ascended to power as Muhammad bin Tughlaq, and ruled for 26 years.

=== Muhammad bin Tughluq ===
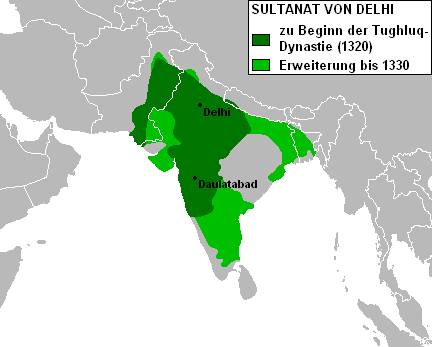
A map showing the expansion of Delhi Sultanate from 1320 (dark green) to 1330. The map also shows the location of the new temporary capital under Muhammad bin Tughlaq.

During Muhammad bin Tughluq's rule, the Delhi Sultanate temporarily expanded to most of the Indian subcontinent, its peak in terms of geographical reach. He attacked and plundered Malwa, Gujarat, Mahratta, Tilang, Kampila, Dhur-samundar, Mabar, Lakhnauti, Chittagong, Sunarganw and Tirhut. His distant campaigns were expensive, although each raid and attack on non-Muslim kingdoms brought new looted wealth and ransom payments from captured people. The extended empire was difficult to retain, and rebellions all over Indian subcontinent became routine.

He raised taxes to levels where people refused to pay any. In India's fertile lands between Ganges and Yamuna rivers, the Sultan increased the land tax rate on non-Muslims by tenfold in some districts, and twentyfold in others. Along with land taxes, dhimmis (non-Muslims) were required to pay crop taxes by giving up half or more of their harvested crop. These sharply higher crop and land tax led entire villages of Hindu farmers to quit farming and escape into jungles; they refused to grow anything or work at all. Many became robber clans. Famines followed. The Sultan responded with bitterness by expanding arrests, torture and mass punishments, killing people as if he was "cutting down weeds". Historical documents note that Muhammad bin Tughluq was cruel and severe not only with non-Muslims, but also with certain sects of Musalmans. He routinely executed Sayyids (Shia), Sufis, Qalandars, and other Muslim officials. His court historian Ziauddin Barni noted,

Not a day or week passed without spilling of much Musalman blood, (...)

— Ziauddin Barni, Tarikh-I Firoz Shahi

Muhammad bin Tughlaq chose the city of Deogiri in present-day Indian state of Maharashtra (renaming it to Daulatabad), as the second administrative capital of the Dehli Sultanate. He ordered a forced migration of the Muslim population of Dehli, including his royal family, the nobles, Syeds, Sheikhs and 'Ulema to settle in Daulatabad. The purpose of transferring the entire Muslim elite to Daulatabad was to enroll them in his mission of world conquest. He saw their role as propagandists who would adapt Islamic religious symbolism to the rhetoric of empire, and that the Sufis could by persuasion bring many of the inhabitants of the Deccan to become Muslim. Tughluq cruelly punished the nobles who were unwilling to move to Daulatabad, seeing their non-compliance of his order as equivalent to rebellion. According to Ferishta, when the Mongols arrived in Punjab, the Sultan returned the elite back to Delhi, although Daulatabad remained as an administrative centre. One result of the transfer of the elite to Daulatabad was the nobility's hatred of the Sultan, which remained in their minds for a long time. The other result was that he managed to create a stable Muslim elite and result in the growth of the Muslim population of Daulatabad who did not return to Dehli. Muhammad bin Tughlaq's adventures in the Deccan region also marked campaigns of destruction and desecration of Hindu and Jain temples, for example the Swayambhu Shiva Temple and the Thousand Pillar Temple. During the 1323 invasion of Srirangam, the Reganathaswamy Temple was sacked. Before the impending attack, temple priests walled up the main stone icon, while Pillai Lokacharya—a Vaishnava āchārya—fled southward with the bronze processional statute of the deity. Swami Vedanta Desika escaped after concealing the surviving manuscripts as an estimated 12,000 Vaishnava scholars were killed in the battle. Regular temple worship remained suspended for over five decades until Vijayanagara forces liberated the city in 1371.

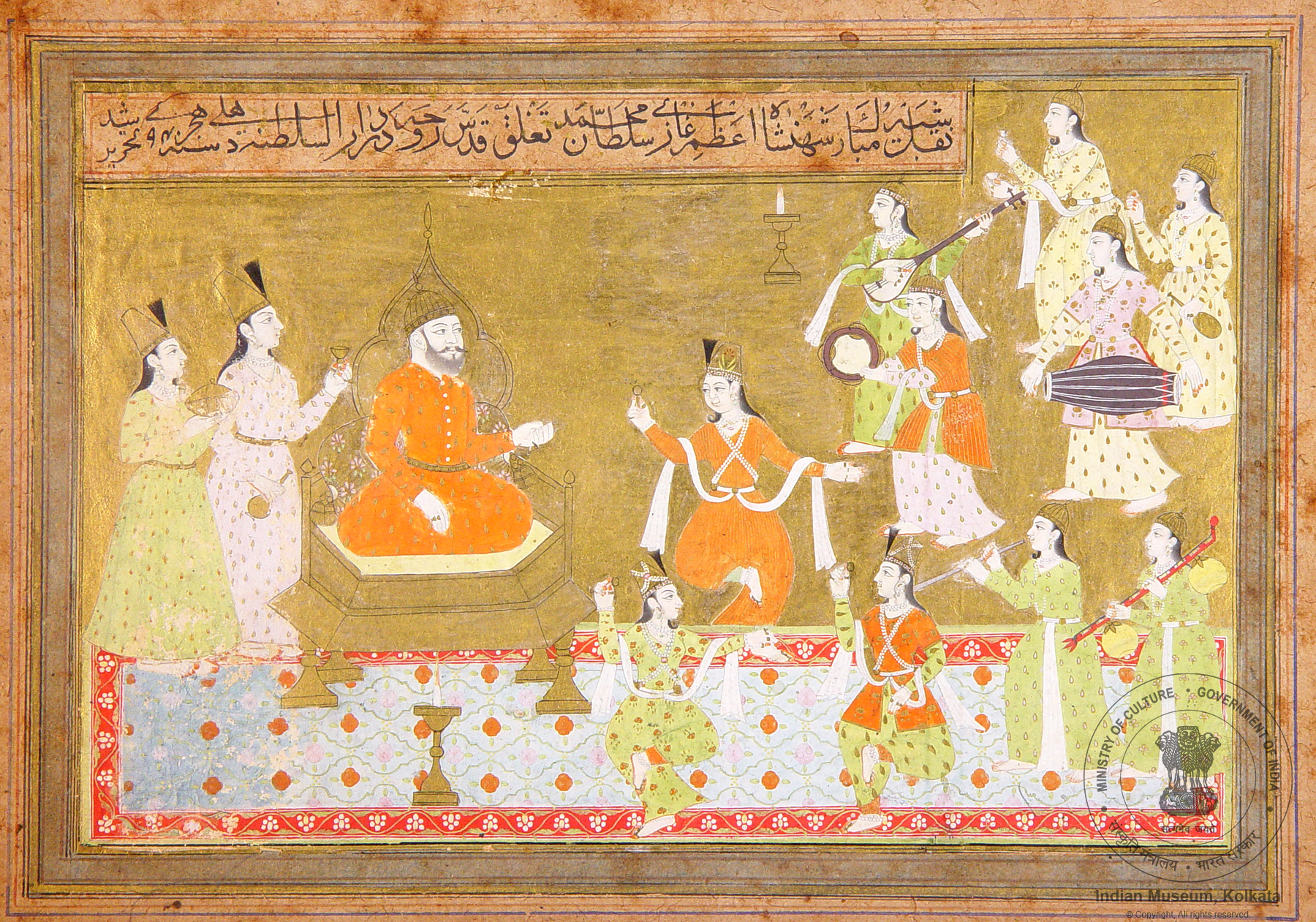
Early Mughal painting of Muhammad bin Tughlaq on the throne (1534)

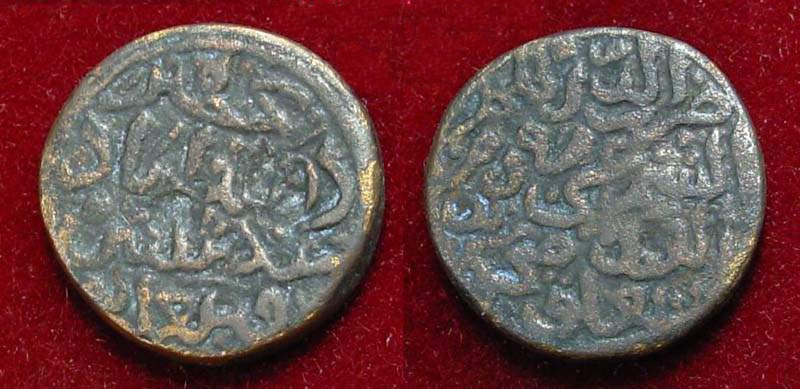
A base metal coin of Muhammad bin Tughlaq that led to an economic collapse.

Revolts against Muhammad bin Tughlaq began in 1327, continued over his reign, and over time the geographical reach of the Sultanate shrunk particularly after 1335. The Indian Muslim soldier Jalaluddin Ahsan Khan, a native of Kaithal in North India, founded the Madurai Sultanate in South India. The Vijayanagara Empire originated in southern India as a direct response to attacks from the Delhi Sultanate. The Vijayanagara Empire liberated southern India from the Delhi Sultanate. In 1336 Kapaya Nayak of the Musunuri Nayak defeated the Tughlaq army and reconquered Warangal from the Delhi Sultanate. In 1338 his own nephew rebelled in Malwa, whom he attacked, caught and flayed alive. By 1339, the eastern regions under local Muslim governors and southern parts led by Hindu kings had revolted and declared independence from Delhi Sultanate. Muhammad bin Tughlaq did not have the resources or support to respond to the shrinking kingdom. By 1347, the Deccan had revolted under Ismail Mukh, an Afghan. Despite this, he was elderly and had no interest in ruling, and as a result, he stepped down in favour of Zafar Khan, another Afghan, who was the founder of the Bahmanid Sultanate. As a result, the Deccan had become an independent and competing Muslim kingdom

Muhammad bin Tughlaq was an intellectual, with extensive knowledge of Quran, Fiqh, poetry and other fields. He was deeply suspicious of his kinsmen and wazirs (ministers), extremely severe with his opponents, and took decisions that caused economic upheaval. For example, after his expensive campaigns to expand Islamic empire, the state treasury was empty of precious metal coins. So he ordered minting of coins from base metals with face value of silver coins – a decision that failed because ordinary people minted counterfeit coins from base metal they had in their houses.

Ziauddin Barni, a historian in Muhammad bin Tughlaq's court, wrote that the houses of Hindus became a coin mint and people in Hindustan provinces produced fake copper coins worth crores to pay the tribute, taxes and jizya imposed on them. The economic experiments of Muhammad bin Tughlaq resulted in a collapsed economy, and nearly a decade long famine followed that killed numerous people in the countryside. The historian Walford chronicled Delhi and most of India faced severe famines during Muhammad bin Tughlaq's rule, in the years after the base metal coin experiment. Tughlaq introduced token coinage of brass and copper to augment the silver coinage which only led to increasing ease of forgery and loss to the treasury. Also, the people were not willing to trade their gold and silver for the new brass and copper coins. Consequently, the sultan had to withdraw the lot, "buying back both the real and the counterfeit at great expense until mountains of coins had accumulated within the walls of Tughluqabad."

Muhammad bin Tughlaq planned an attack on Khurasan and Irak (Babylon and Persia) as well as China to bring these regions under Sunni Islam. For Khurasan attack, a cavalry of over 300,000 horses were gathered near Delhi, for a year at state treasury's expense, while spies claiming to be from Khurasan collected rewards for information on how to attack and subdue these lands. However, before he could begin the attack on Persian lands in the second year of preparations, the plunder he had collected from Indian subcontinent had emptied, provinces were too poor to support the large army, and the soldiers refused to remain in his service without pay. For the attack on China, Muhammad bin Tughlaq sent 100,000 soldiers, a part of his army, over the Himalayas. However, Hindus closed the passes through the Himalayas and blocked the passage for retreat. Kangra's Prithvi Chand II defeated the army of Muhammad bin Tughluq which was not able to fight in the hills. Nearly all his 100,000 soldiers perished in 1333 and were forced to retreat. The high mountain weather and lack of retreat destroyed that army in the Himalayas. The few soldiers who returned with bad news were executed under orders of the Sultan.

During his reign, state revenues collapsed from his policies. To cover state expenses, Muhammad bin Tughlaq sharply raised taxes on his ever-shrinking empire. Except in times of war, he did not pay his staff from his treasury. Ibn Battuta noted in his memoir that Muhammad bin Tughlaq paid his army, judges (qadi), court advisors, wazirs, governors, district officials and others in his service by awarding them the right to force collect taxes on Hindu villages, keep a portion and transfer rest to his treasury. Those who failed to pay taxes were hunted and executed. Muhammad bin Tughlaq died in March 1351 while trying to chase and punish people for rebellion and their refusal to pay taxes in Sindh (now in Pakistan) and Gujarat (now in India).

Historians have attempted to determine the motivations behind Muhammad bin Tughlaq's behaviour and his actions. Some state Tughlaq tried to enforce orthodox Islamic observance and practice, promote jihad in South Asia as al-Mujahid fi sabilillah ('Warrior for the Path of God') under the influence of Ibn Taymiyyah of Syria. Others suggest insanity.

At the time of Muhammad bin Tughlaq's death, the geographic control of Delhi Sultanate had shrunk to the north of the Narmada river.

=== Feroz Shah Tughluq ===
Feroz Shah Kotla

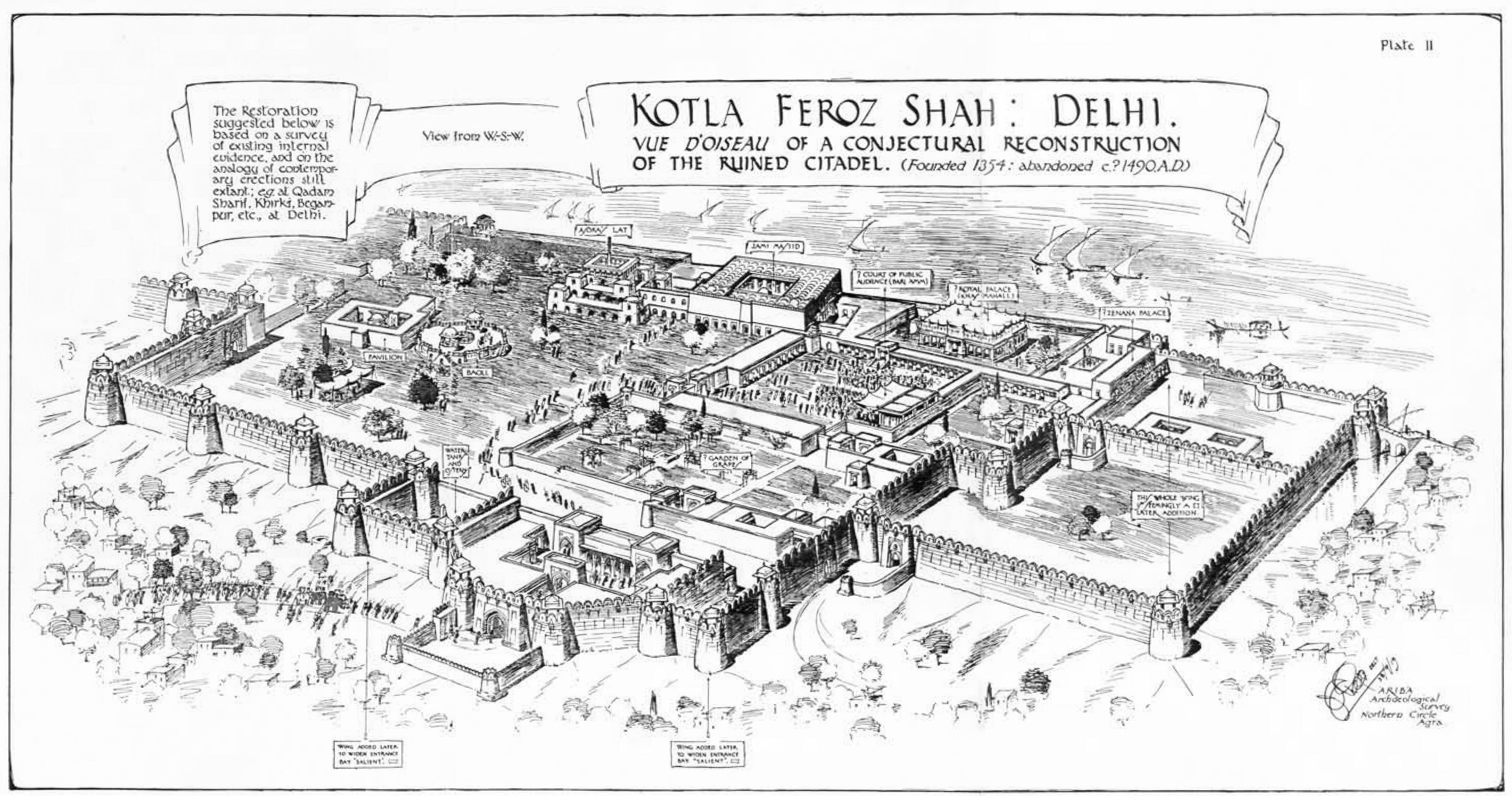
Tentative reconstruction of Feroz Shah Kotla.

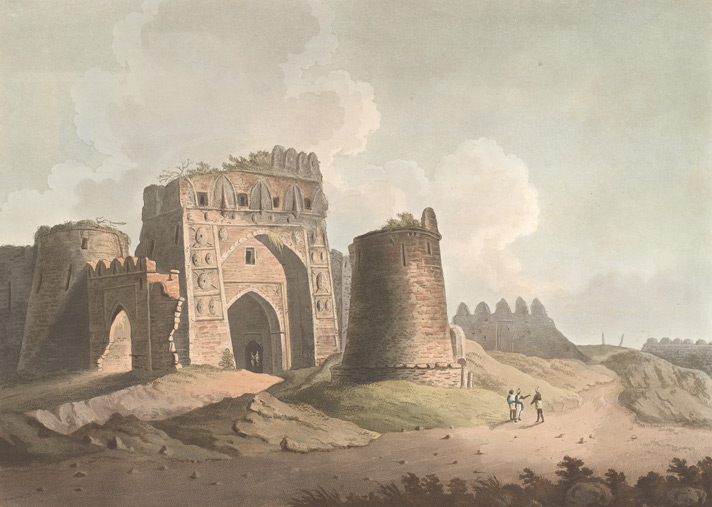
West gate of Feroz Shah Kotla, circa 1800

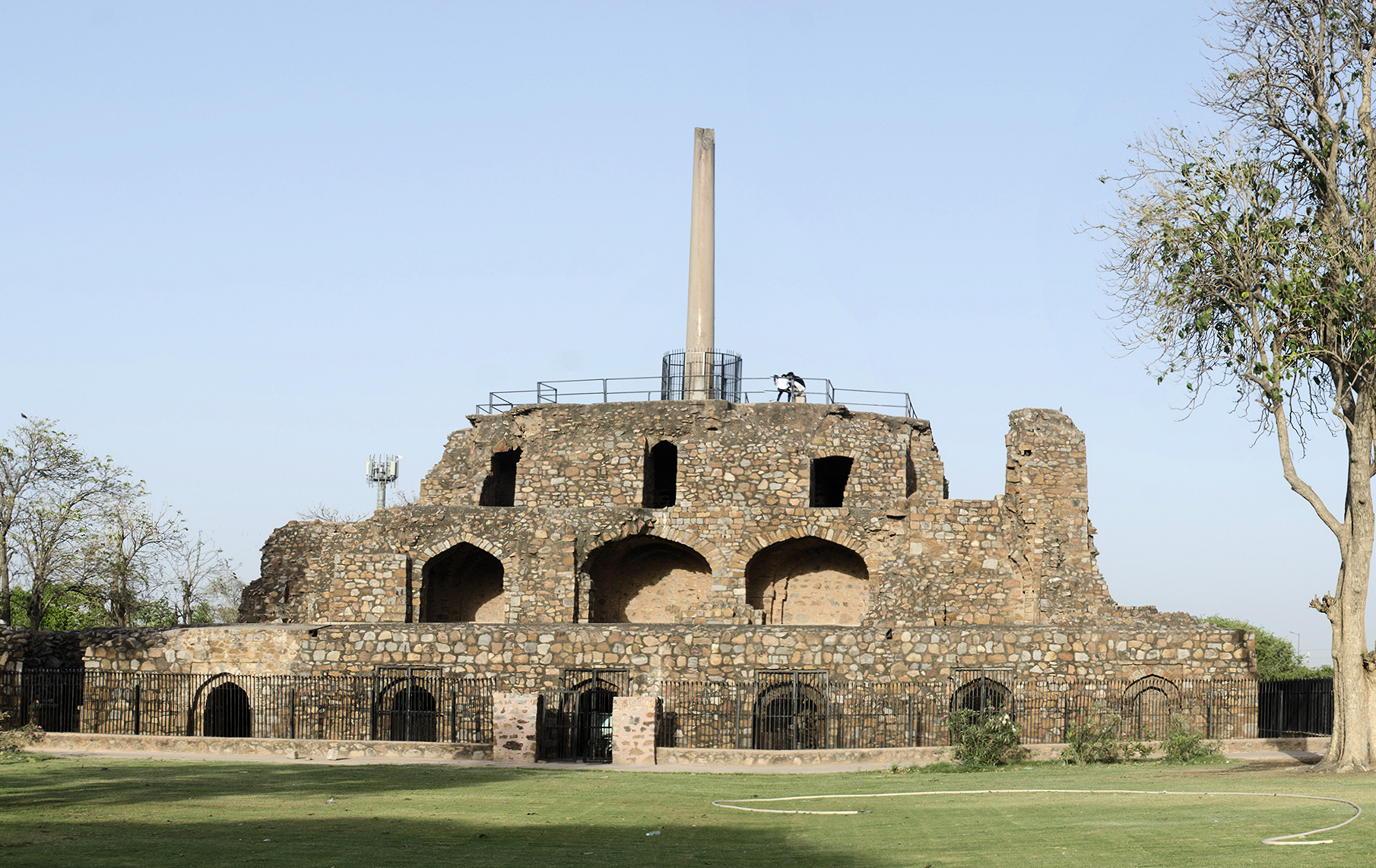
Ashoka's Delhi-Topra pillar in Feroz Shah Kotla

The Tughlaq dynasty is remembered for its architectural patronage. The famous fortress of Feroz Shah Kotla reused an old Buddhist pillar erected by Ashoka in the 3rd century BCE, the Delhi-Topra pillar. The Sultanate initially wanted to use the pillar to make a mosque minaret. Firuz Shah Tughlaq decided otherwise and had it installed near a mosque. The meaning of the Brahmi script on the pillars (the Edicts of Ashoka) was unknown in Firuz Shah's time.

After Muhammad bin Tughluq died, a collateral relative, Mahmud Ibn Muhammad, ruled for less than a month. Thereafter, Muhammad bin Tughluq's 45-year-old nephew Firuz Shah Tughlaq replaced him and assumed the throne. His rule lasted 37 years. His father Sipah Rajab had become infatuated with a Hindu princess named Naila. She initially refused to marry him. Her father refused the marriage proposal as well. Sultan Muhammad bin Tughlaq and Sipah Rajab then sent in an army with a demand for one year taxes in advance and a threat of seizure of all property of her family and Abohar people. The kingdom was suffering from famines, and could not meet the ransom demand. The princess, after learning about ransom demands against her family and people, offered herself in sacrifice if the army would stop the misery to her people. Sipah Rajab and the Sultan accepted the proposal. Sipah Rajab and Naila were married and Firoz Shah was their first son.

The court historian Ziauddin Barni, who served both Muhammad Tughlaq and the first six years of Firoz Shah Tughlaq, noted that all those who were in service of Muhammad were dismissed and executed by Firoz Shah. In his second book, Barni states that Firuz Shah was the mildest sovereign since the rule of Islam came to Delhi. Muslim soldiers enjoyed the taxes they collected from Hindu villages they had rights over, without having to constantly go to war as in previous regimes. Other court historians such as 'Afif record a number of conspiracies and assassination attempts on Firoz Shah Tughlaq, such as by his first cousin and the daughter of Muhammad bin Tughlaq.

Firoz Shah Tughlaq tried to regain the old kingdom boundary by waging a war with Bengal for 11 months in 1359. However, Bengal did not fall, and remained outside of Delhi Sultanate. Firuz Shah Tughlaq was somewhat weak militarily, mainly because of inept leadership in the army.

An educated sultan, Firoz Shah left a memoir. In it he wrote that he banned torture in practice in Delhi Sultanate by his predecessors, tortures such as amputations, tearing out of eyes, sawing people alive, crushing people's bones as punishment, pouring molten lead into throats, putting people on fire, driving nails into hands and feet, among others. The Sunni Sultan also wrote that he did not tolerate attempts by Rafawiz Shia Muslim and Mahdi sects from proselytising people into their faith, nor did he tolerate Hindus who tried to rebuild their temples after his armies had destroyed those temples. As punishment, wrote the Sultan, he put many Shias, Mahdi and Hindus to death (siyasat). Shams-i Siraj 'Afif, his court historian, also recorded Firoz Shah Tughlaq burning a Hindu Brahmin alive for converting Muslim women. In his memoirs, Firoz Shah Tughlaq lists his accomplishments to include converting Hindus to Sunni Islam by announcing an exemption from taxes and jizya for those who convert, and by lavishing new converts with presents and honours. Simultaneously, he raised taxes and jizya, assessing it at three levels, and stopping the practice of his predecessors who had historically exempted all Hindu Brahmins from jizya tax. He also vastly expanded the number of slaves in his service and those of amirs (Muslim nobles). Firoz Shah Tughlaq reign was marked by reduction in extreme forms of torture, eliminating favours to select parts of society, but an increased intolerance and persecution of targeted groups. After the death of his heir in 1376, Firuz Shah started strict implementation of Sharia throughout his dominions.

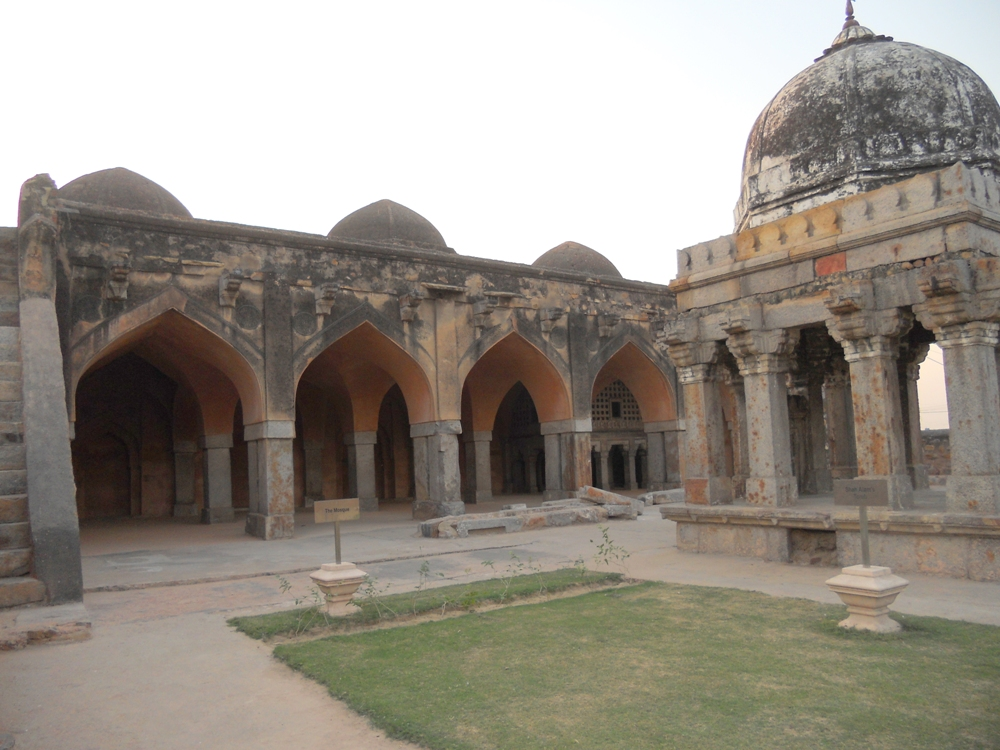
Wazirabad mosque, near Delhi, was built during Firoz Shah Tughlaq reign.

Firuz Shah suffered from bodily infirmities, and his rule was considered by his court historians as more merciful than that of Muhammad bin Tughlaq. When Firuz Shah came to power, India was suffering from a collapsed economy, abandoned villages and towns, and frequent famines. He undertook many infrastructure projects including an irrigation canal connecting Yamuna-Ghaggar and Yamuna-Sutlej rivers, bridges, madrasas (religious schools), mosques and other Islamic buildings. Firuz Shah Tughlaq is credited with patronising Indo-Islamic architecture, including the installation of lats (ancient Hindu and Buddhist pillars) near mosques. The irrigation canals continued to be in use through the 19th century. After Feroz died in 1388, the Tughlaq dynasty's power continued to fade, and no more able leaders came to the throne. Firoz Shah Tughlaq's death created anarchy and disintegration of kingdom. In the years preceding his death, internecine strife among his descendants had already erupted.

=== Civil wars ===
The first civil war broke out in 1384 four years before the death of ageing Firoz Shah Tughlaq, while the second civil war started in 1394 six years after Firoz Shah was dead. The Islamic historians Sirhindi and Bihamadkhani provide the detailed account of this period. These civil wars were primarily between different factions of Sunni Islam aristocracy, each seeking sovereignty and land to tax dhimmis and extract income from resident peasants.

Main South Asian polities in 1400, towards the end of the Tughlaq dynasty.

Firuz Shah Tughluq's favourite grandson died in 1376. Thereafter, Firuz Shah sought and followed Sharia more than ever, with the help of his wazirs. He himself fell ill in 1384. By then, Muslim nobility who had installed Firuz Shah Tughluq to power in 1351 had died out, and their descendants had inherited the wealth and rights to extract taxes from non-Muslim peasants. Khan Jahan II, a wazir in Delhi, was the son of Firuz Shah Tughluq's favourite wazir Khan Jahan I, and rose in power after his father died in 1368. The young wazir was in open rivalry with Muhammad Shah, the son of Firuz Shah Tughluq. The wazir's power grew as he appointed more amirs and granted favours. He persuaded the Sultan to name his great-grandson as his heir. Then Khan Jahan II tried to convince Firuz Shah Tughlaq to dismiss his only surviving son. Instead of dismissing his son, the Sultan dismissed the wazir. The crisis that followed led to first civil war, arrest and execution of the wazir, followed by a rebellion and civil war in and around Delhi. Muhammad Shah too was expelled in 1387. The Sultan Firuz Shah Tughluq died in 1388. Tughluq Khan assumed power, but died in conflict. In 1389, Abu Bakr Shah assumed power, but he too died within a year. The civil war continued under Sultan Muhammad Shah, and by 1390, it had led to the seizure and execution of all Muslim nobility who were aligned, or suspected to be aligned to Khan Jahan II.

While the civil war was in progress, predominantly Hindu populations of Himalayan foothills of north India had rebelled, stopped paying Jizya and Kharaj taxes to Sultan's officials. Hindus of southern Doab region of India (now Etawah) joined the rebellion in 1390. Sultan Muhammad Shah attacked Hindus rebelling near Delhi and southern Doab in 1392, with mass executions of peasants, and razing Etawah to the ground. However, by then, most of India had transitioned to a patchwork of smaller Muslim Sultanates and Hindu kingdoms. In 1394, Hindus in Lahore region and northwest South Asia (now Pakistan) had re-asserted self-rule. Muhammad Shah amassed an army to attack them, with his son Humayun Khan as the commander-in-chief. While preparations were in progress in Delhi in January 1394, Sultan Muhammad Shah died. His son, Humayun Khan assumed power but was murdered within two months. The brother of Humayun Khan, Nasir-al-din Mahmud Shah assumed power – but he enjoyed little support from Muslim nobility, the wazirs and amirs. The Sultanate had lost command over almost all eastern and western provinces of already shrunken Sultanate. Within Delhi, factions of Muslim nobility formed by October 1394, triggering the second civil war.

Tartar Khan installed a second Sultan, Nasir-al-din Nusrat Shah in Firozabad, few kilometres from the first Sultan seat of power in late 1394. The two Sultans claimed to be rightful ruler of South Asia, each with a small army, controlled by a coterie of Muslim nobility. Battles occurred every month, duplicity and switching of sides by amirs became commonplace, and the civil war between the two Sultan factions continued through 1398, till the invasion by Timur.

=== Timur's Invasion ===
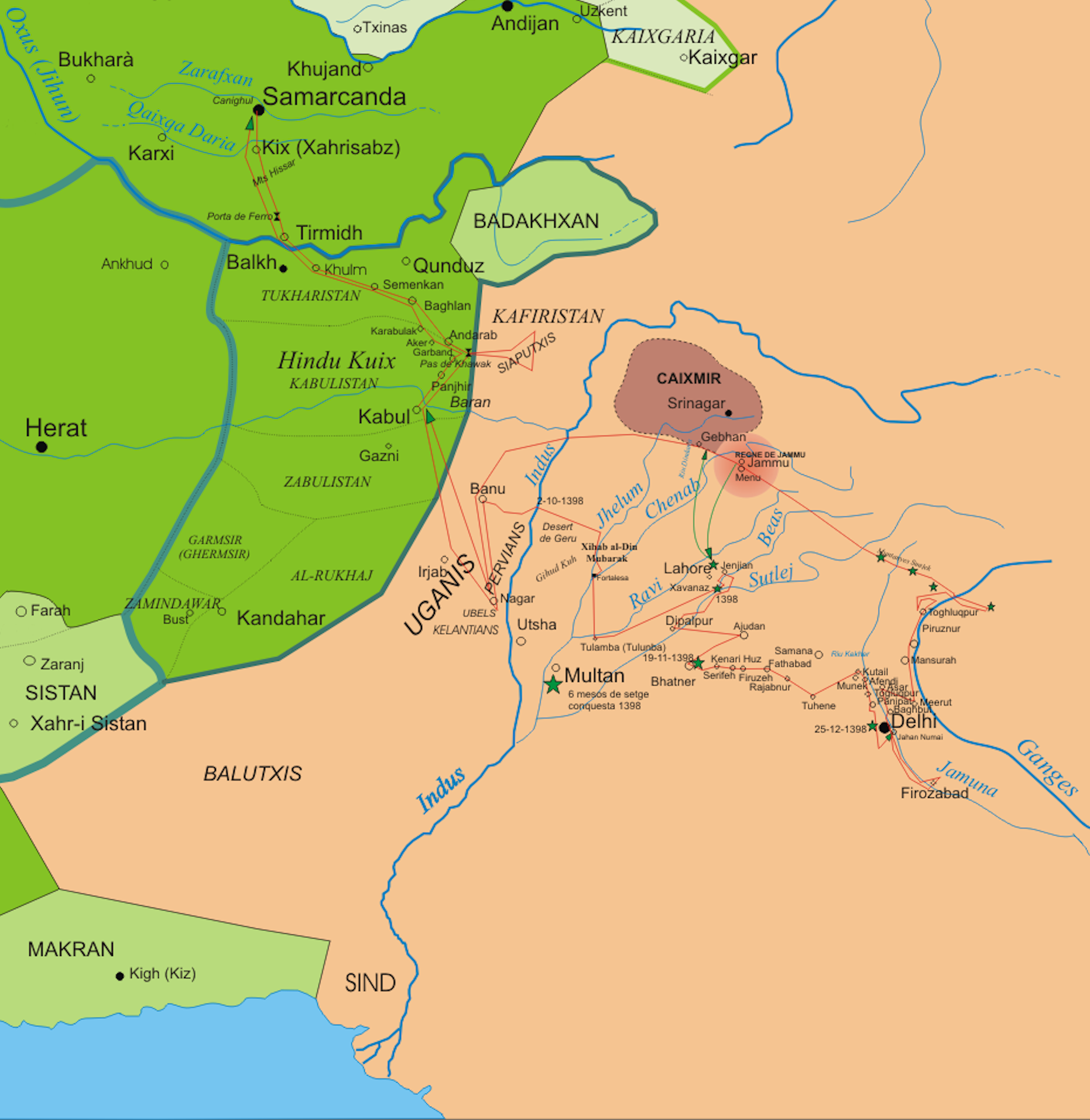
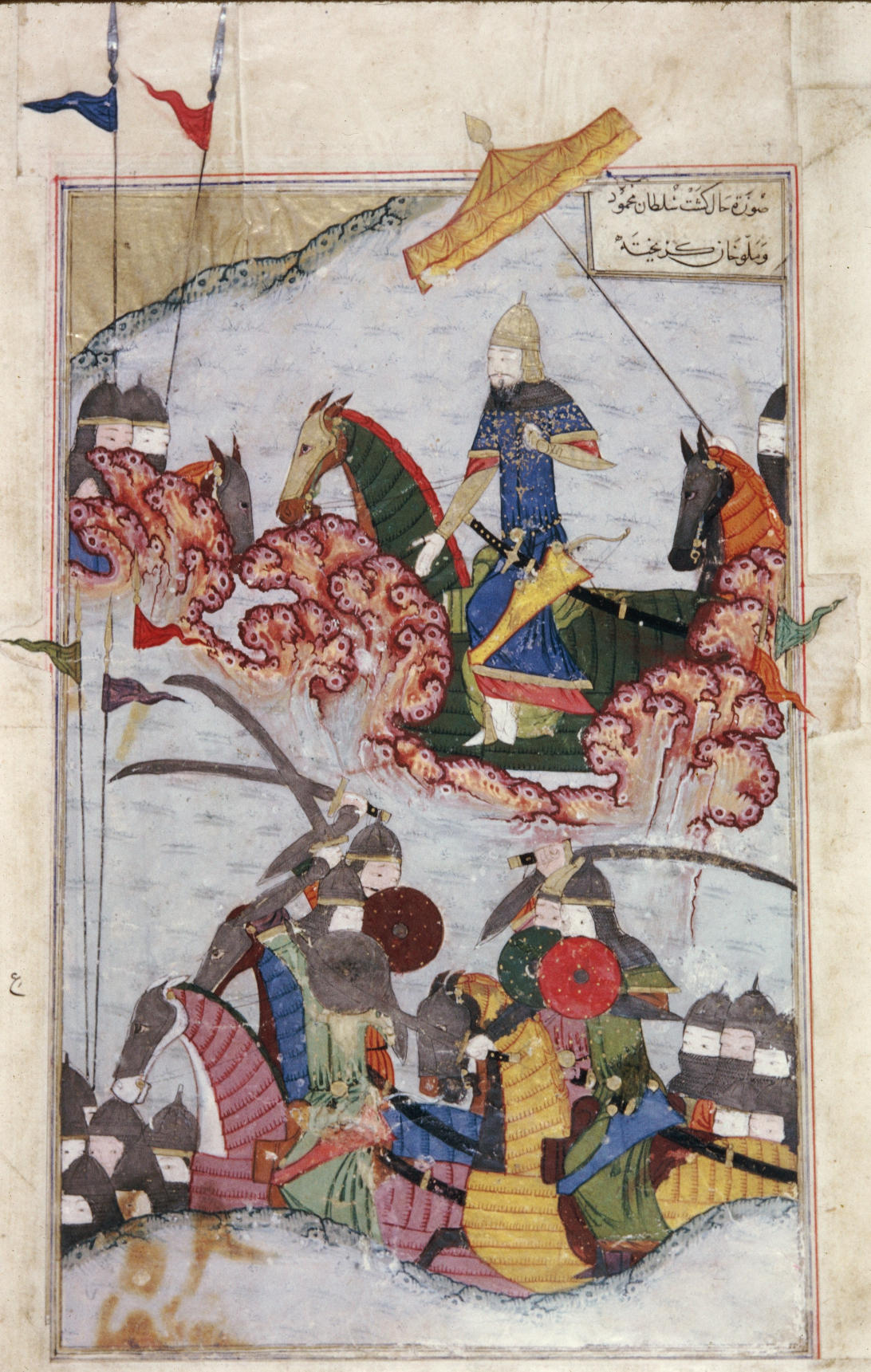
Map of Timur's invasion of India in 1398-1399, and painting of Timur defeating the Sultan of Delhi, Nasir Al-Din Mahmud Tughluq, in the winter of 1397–1398 (painting dated 1436).

The lowest point for the dynasty came in 1398, when Turco-Mongol invader, Timur (Tamerlane) defeated four armies of the Sultanate. During the invasion, Sultan Mahmud Khan fled before Tamerlane as he entered Delhi. For eight days Delhi was plundered, its population massacred, and over 100,000 prisoners were killed as well.

The capture of the Delhi Sultanate was one of Timur's greatest victories, as at that time, Delhi was one of the richest cities in the world. After Delhi fell to Timur's army, uprisings by its citizens against the Turkic-Mongols began to occur, causing a retaliatory bloody massacre within the city walls. After three days of citizens uprising within Delhi, it was said that the city reeked of the decomposing bodies of its citizens with their heads being erected like structures and the bodies left as food for the birds by Timur's soldiers. Timur's invasion and destruction of Delhi continued the chaos that was still consuming India, and the city would not be able to recover from the great loss it suffered for almost a century.

It is believed that before his departure, Timur appointed Khizr Khan, the future founder of the succeeding Sayyid dynasty, as his viceroy at Delhi. Initially, Khizr Khan could only establish his control over Multan, Dipalpur and parts of Sindh. Soon he started his campaign against the Tughlaq dynasty, and entered Delhi victoriously on 6 June 1414.

== Ibn Battuta's memoir on Tughlaq dynasty ==
Ibn Battuta, the Moroccan Muslim traveller, left extensive notes on the Tughlaq dynasty in his travel memoirs. Ibn Battuta arrived in India through the mountains of Afghanistan, in 1334, at the height of the Tughlaq dynasty's geographic empire. On his way, he learnt that Sultan Muhammad Tughluq liked gifts from his visitors, and gave to his visitors gifts of far greater value in return. Ibn Battuta met Muhammad bin Tughluq, presenting him with gifts of arrows, camels, thirty horses, slaves and other goods. Muhammad bin Tughlaq responded by giving Ibn Battuta with a welcoming gift of 2,000 silver dinars, a furnished house and the job of a judge with an annual salary of 5,000 silver dinars that Ibn Battuta had the right to keep by collecting taxes from two and a half Hindu villages near Delhi.

In his memoirs about the Tughlaq dynasty, Ibn Batutta recorded the history of Qutb complex which included Quwat al-Islam Mosque and the Qutb Minar. He noted the seven-year famine from 1335, which killed thousands upon thousands of people near Delhi, while the Sultan was busy attacking rebellions. He was tough both against non-Muslims and Muslims. For example,

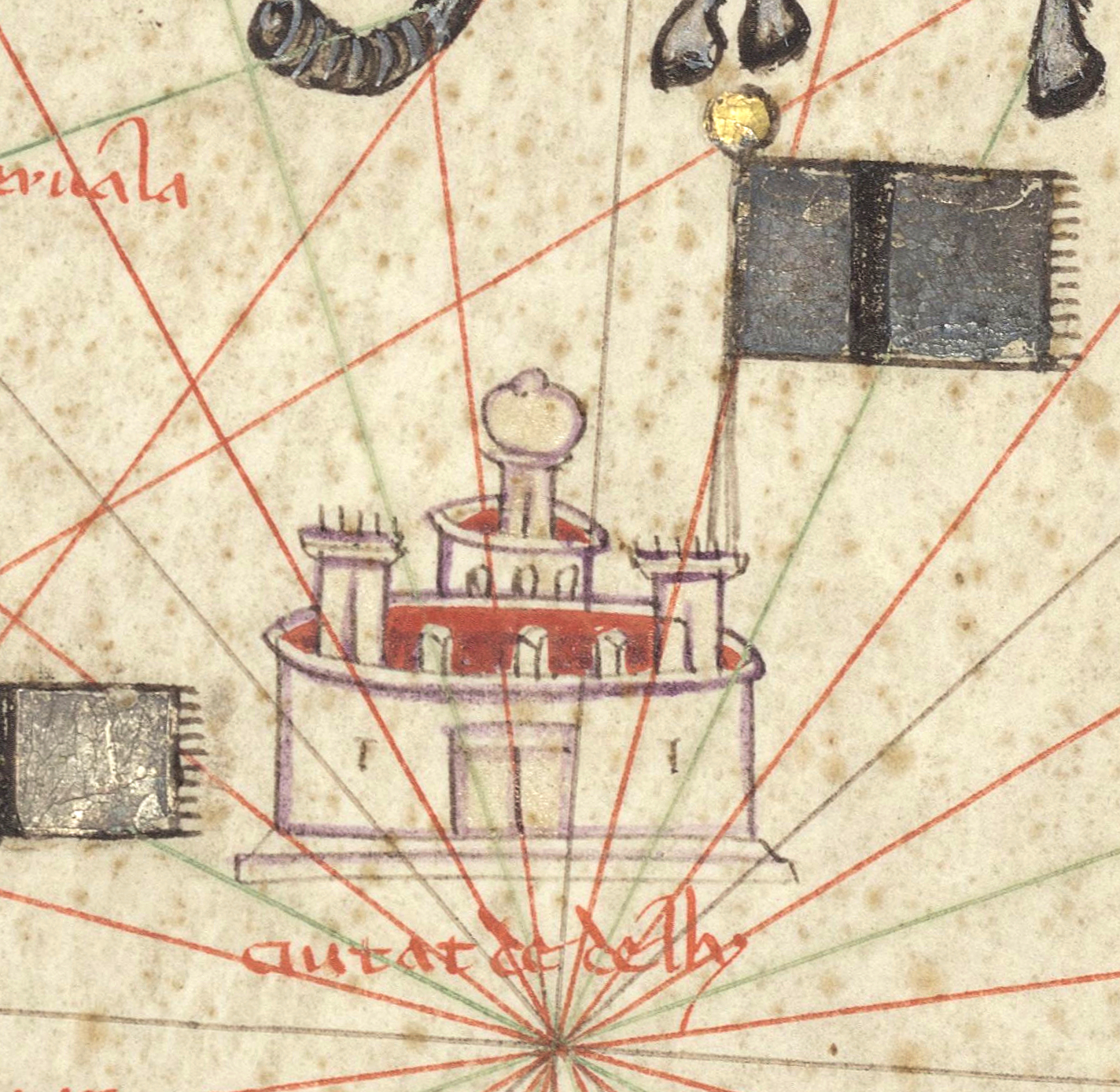
City of Delhi ("ciutat de delly"), capital of the Tughlaqs, in the Catalan Atlas (1375).

Not a week passed without the spilling of much Muslim blood and the running of streams of gore before the entrance of his palace. This included cutting people in half, skinning them alive, chopping off heads and displaying them on poles as a warning to others, or having prisoners tossed about by elephants with swords attached to their tusks.

— Ibn Battuta, Travel Memoirs (1334-1341, Delhi)

The Sultan was far too ready to shed blood. He punished small faults and great, without respect of persons, whether men of learning, piety or high station. Every day hundreds of people, chained, pinioned, and fettered, are brought to this hall, and those who are for execution are executed, for torture tortured, and those for beating beaten.

— Ibn Battuta, Chapter XV Rihla (Delhi)

In the Tughlaq dynasty, the punishments were extended even to Muslim religious figures who were suspected rebellion. For example, Ibn Battuta mentions Sheikh Shinab al-Din, who was imprisoned and tortured as follows:

On the fourteen day, the Sultan sent him food, but he (Sheikh Shinab al-Din) refused to eat it. When the Sultan heard this he ordered that the sheikh should be fed human excrement [dissolved in water]. [His officials] spread out the sheikh on his back, opened his mouth and made him drink it (the excrement). On the following day, he was beheaded.

— Ibn Battuta, Travel Memoirs (1334-1341, Delhi)

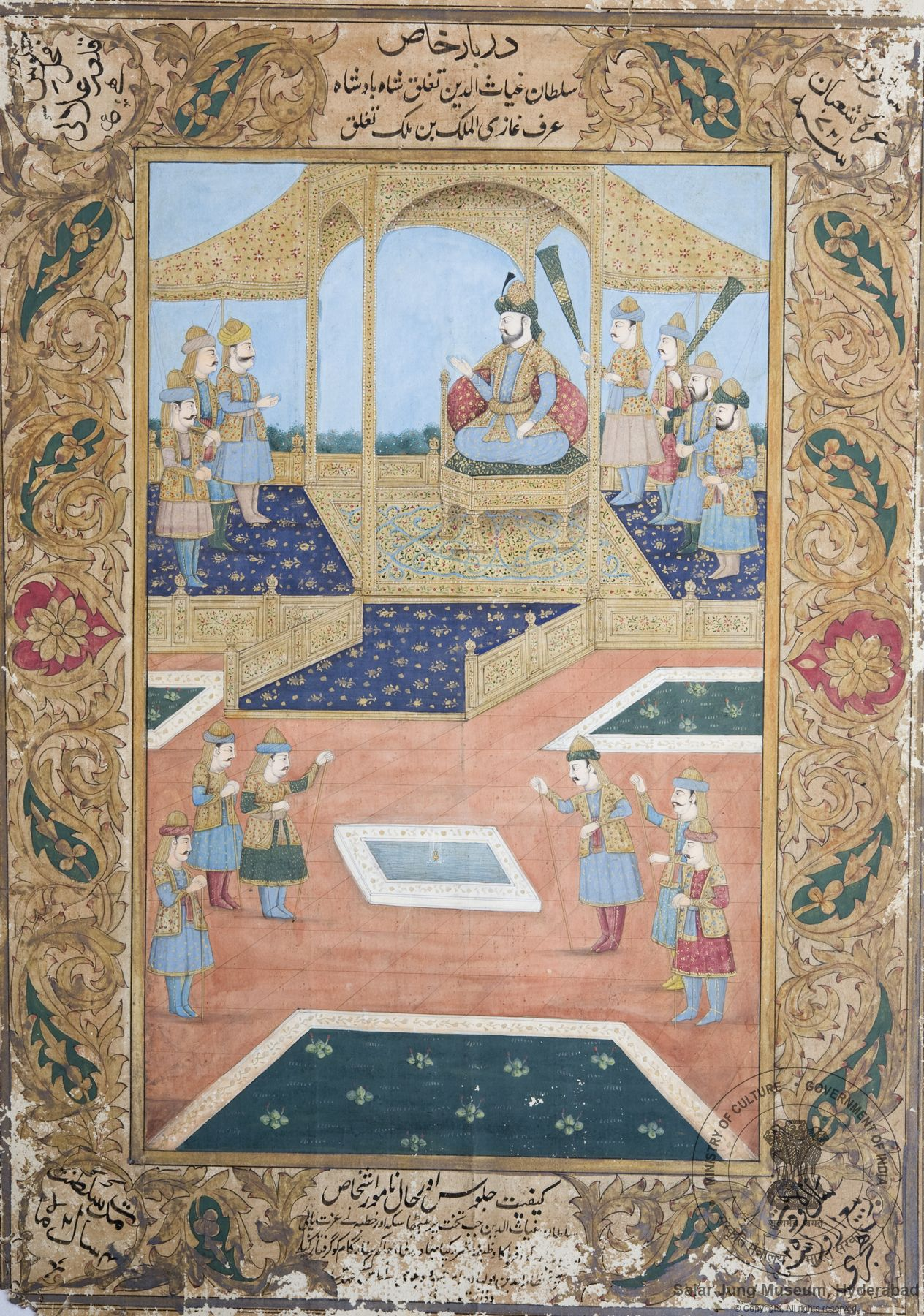
Mughal painting depicting the court of Ghiyath al-Din Tughlaq.

Ibn Batutta wrote that Sultan's officials demanded bribes from him while he was in Delhi, as well as deducted 10% of any sums that Sultan gave to him. Towards the end of his stay in Tughluq dynasty court, Ibn Battuta came under suspicion for his friendship with a Sufi Muslim holy man. Both Ibn Battuta and the Sufi Muslim were arrested. While Ibn Battuta was allowed to leave India, the Sufi Muslim was killed as follows according to Ibn Battuta during the period he was under arrest:

(The Sultan) had the holy man's beard plucked out hair by hair, then banished him from Delhi. Later the Sultan ordered him to return to court, which the holy man refused to do. The man was arrested, tortured in the most horrible way, then beheaded.

— Ibn Battuta, Travel Memoirs (1334-1341, Delhi)

== Slavery under the Tughlaq dynasty ==
Each military campaign and raid on non-Muslim kingdoms yielded loot and seizure of slaves. Additionally, the Sultans patronised a market (al-nakhkhās) for trade of both foreign and Indian slaves. This market flourished under the reign of all Sultans of the Tughlaq dynasty, particularly Ghiyasuddin Tughlaq, Muhammad Tughlaq and Firoz Tughlaq.

Ibn Battuta's memoir records that he fathered a child each with two slave girls, one from Greece and one he purchased during his stay in Delhi Sultanate. This was in addition to the daughter he fathered by marrying a Muslim woman in India. Ibn Battuta also records that Muhammad Tughlaq sent along with his emissaries, both slave boys and slave girls as gifts to other countries such as China.

== Muslim nobility and revolts ==
The Tughlaq dynasty experienced many revolts by Muslim nobility, particularly during Muhammad bin Tughlaq's reign but also during rule of later monarchs such as Firoz Shah Tughlaq.

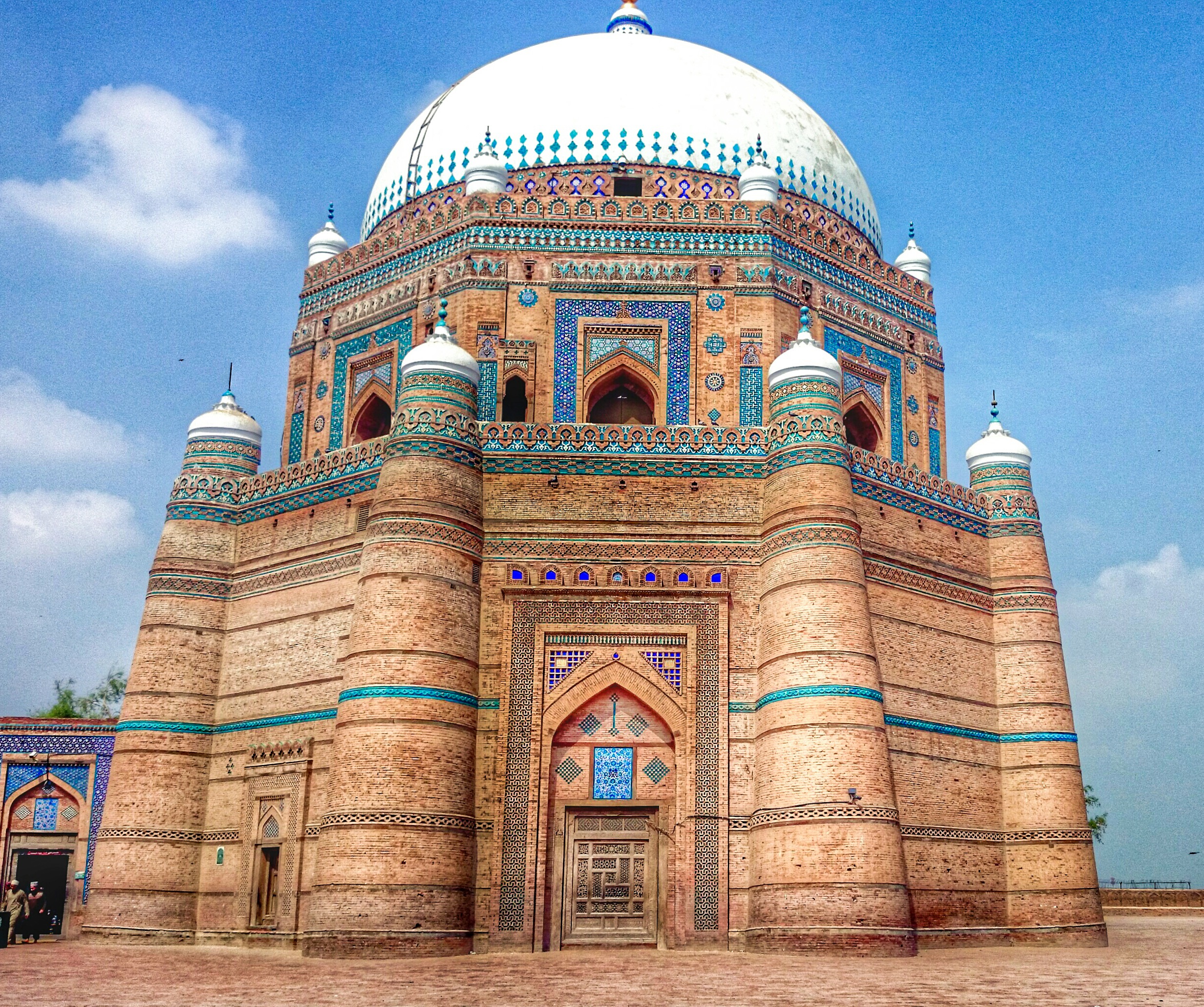
The Tomb of Shah Rukn-e-Alam in Multan, Pakistan, is considered to be the earliest example of Tughluq architecture, built between 1320 and 1324.

The Tughlaqs had attempted to manage their expanded empire by appointing family members and Muslim aristocracy as na'ib (نائب) of Iqta' (farming provinces, اقطاع) under contract. The contract would require that the na'ib shall have the right to forcefully collect taxes from non-Muslim peasants and local economy, and deposit a fixed sum of tribute and taxes to Sultan's treasury on a periodic basis. The contract allowed the na'ib to keep a certain amount of taxes they collected from peasants as their income, but the contract required any excess tax and seized property collected from non-Muslims to be split between na'ib and Sultan in a 20:80 ratio. (Firuz Shah changed this to 80:20 ratio.) The na'ib had the right to keep soldiers and officials to help extract taxes. After contracting with Sultan, the na'ib would enter into subcontracts with Muslim amirs and army commanders, each granted the right over certain villages to force collect or seize produce and property from dhimmis.

This system of tax extraction from peasants and sharing among Muslim nobility led to rampant corruption, arrests, execution and rebellion. For example, in the reign of Firoz Shah Tughlaq, a Muslim noble named Shamsaldin Damghani entered into a contract over the iqta' of Gujarat, promising enormous sums of annual tribute while entering the contract in 1377. He then attempted to force collect the amount deploying his coterie of Muslim amirs, but failed. Even the amount he did manage to collect, he paid nothing to Delhi. Shamsaldin Damghani and Muslim nobility of Gujarat then declared rebellion and separation from Delhi Sultanate. However, the soldiers and peasants of Gujarat refused to fight the war for the Muslim nobility. Shamsaldin Damghani was killed. During the reign of Muhammad Shah Tughlaq, similar rebellions were very common. His own nephew rebelled in Malwa in 1338; Muhammad Shah Tughlaq attacked Malwa, seized his nephew, and then flayed him alive in public.

== Downfall ==
The provinces of Deccan, Bengal, Sindh and Multan had become independent during the reign of Muhammad bin Tughlaq. The invasion of Timur further weakened the Tughlaq empire and allowed several regional chiefs to become independent, resulting in the formation of the sultanates of Gujarat, Malwa and Jaunpur. The Rajput states also expelled the governor of Ajmer and asserted control over Rajputana. The Tughlaq power continued to decline until they were finally overthrown by their former governor of Multan, Khizr Khan, resulting in the rise of the Sayyid Dynasty as the new rulers of the Delhi Sultanate.

== Indo-Islamic architecture ==
The Sultans of the Tughlaq dynasty, particularly Firoz Shah Tughlaq, patronised many construction projects and are credited with the development of Indo-Islamic architecture.

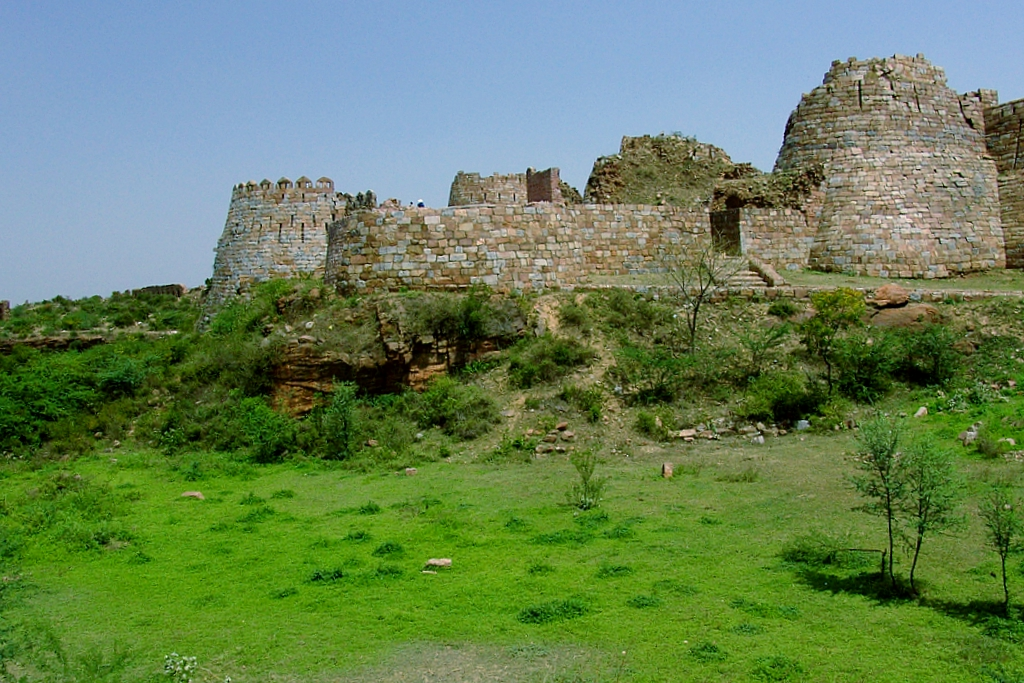
Tughlaqabad Fort, Tughlaqabad, Delhi.

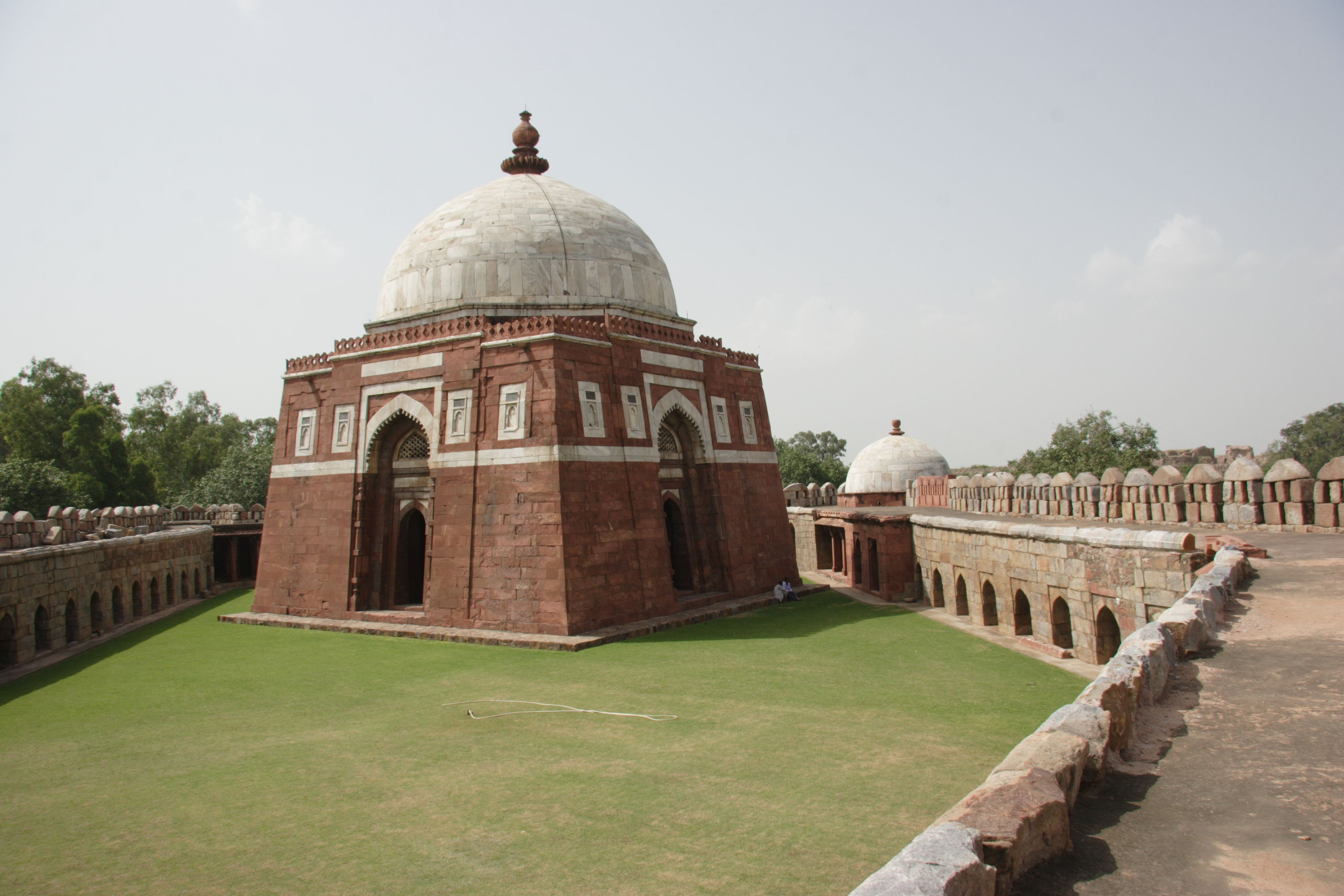
Sultan Ghiyath-ud-din Tughluq Shah's Mausoleum in Tughlaqabad Fort, Tughlaqabad, Delhi.

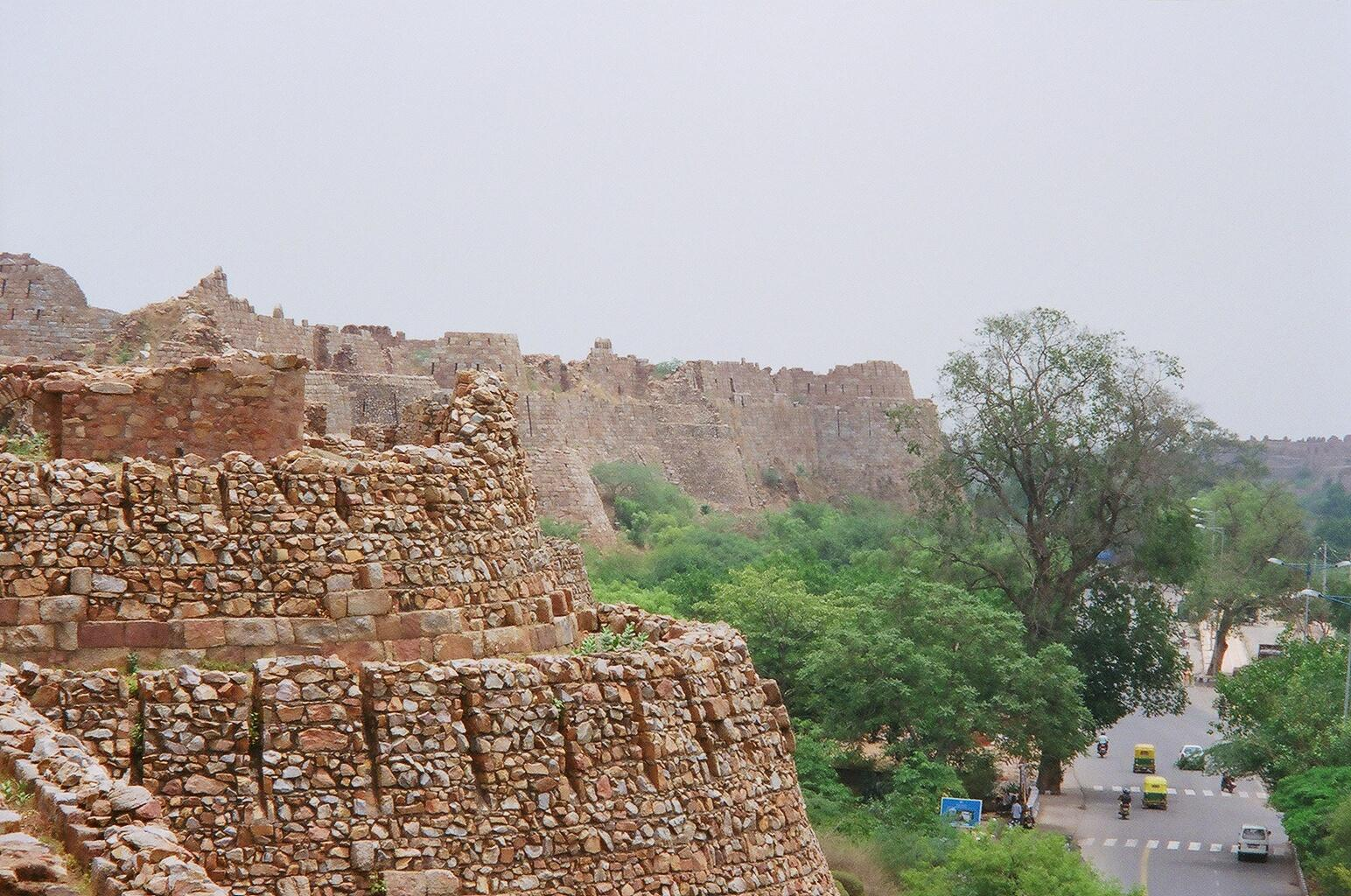
Tughlaqabad fort wall

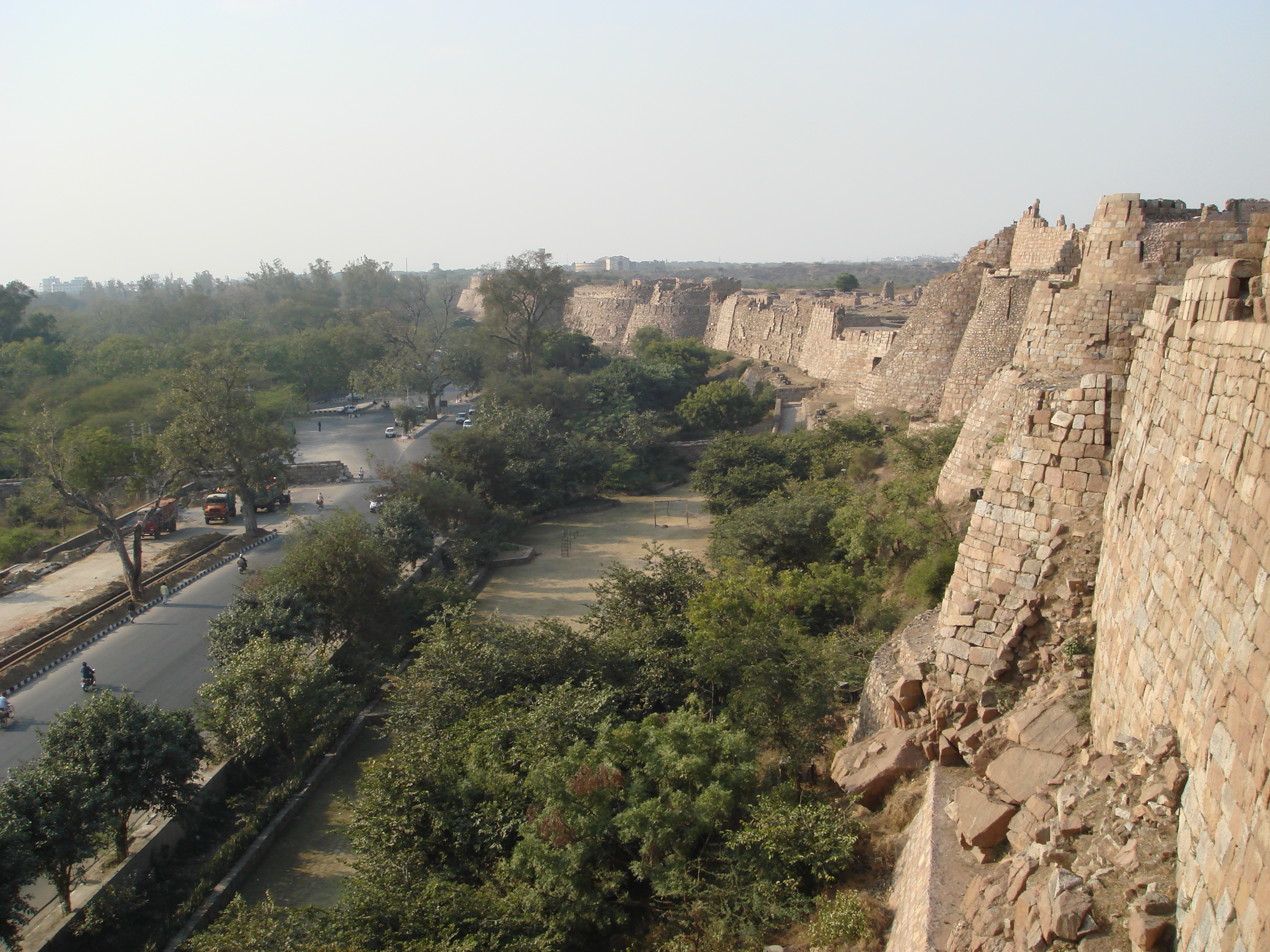
Tughlaqabad Fort

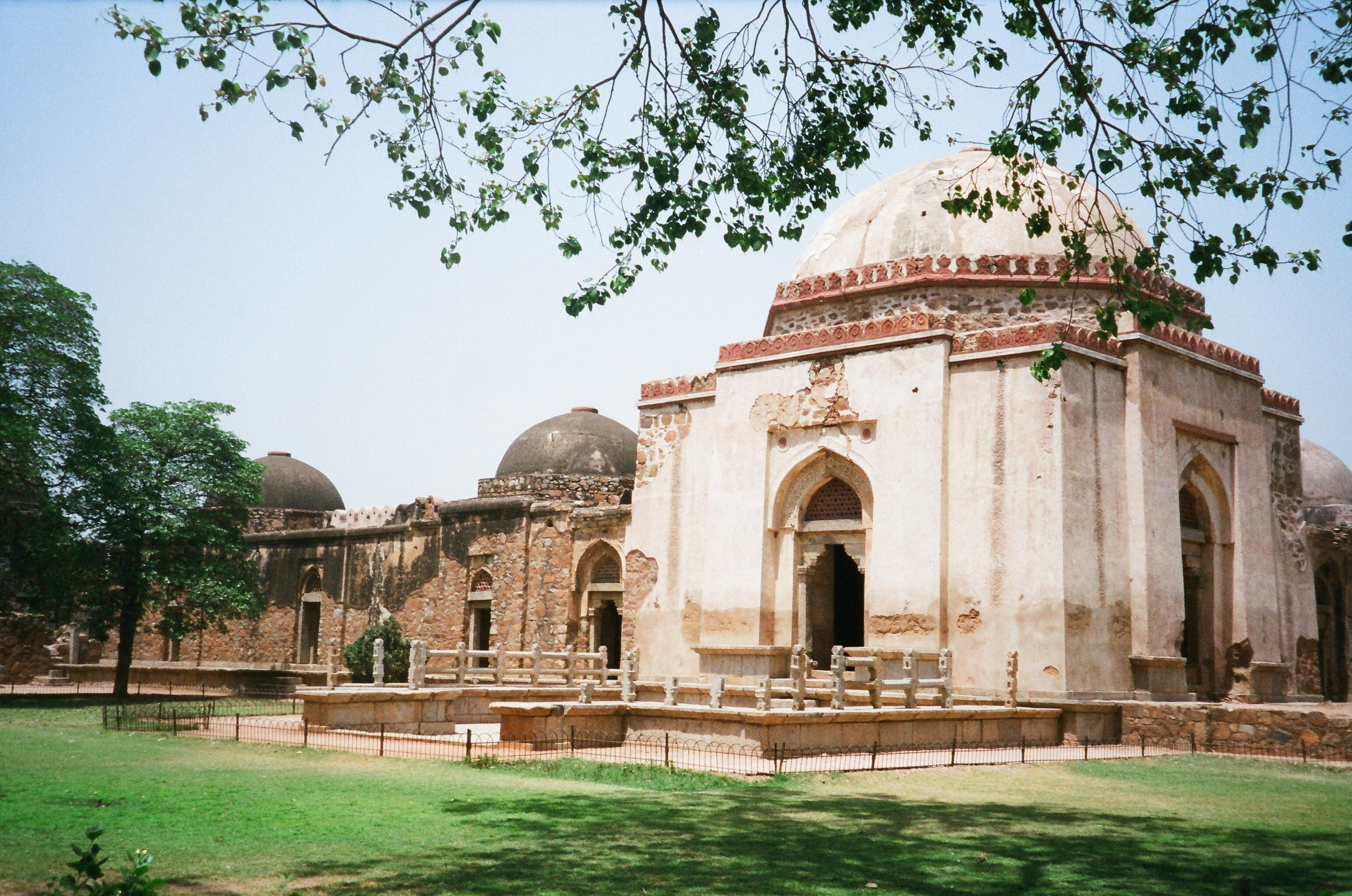
Sultan Feroze Shah Tughlaq's tomb with adjoining Madrassa, in Hauz Khas Complex, Delhi.

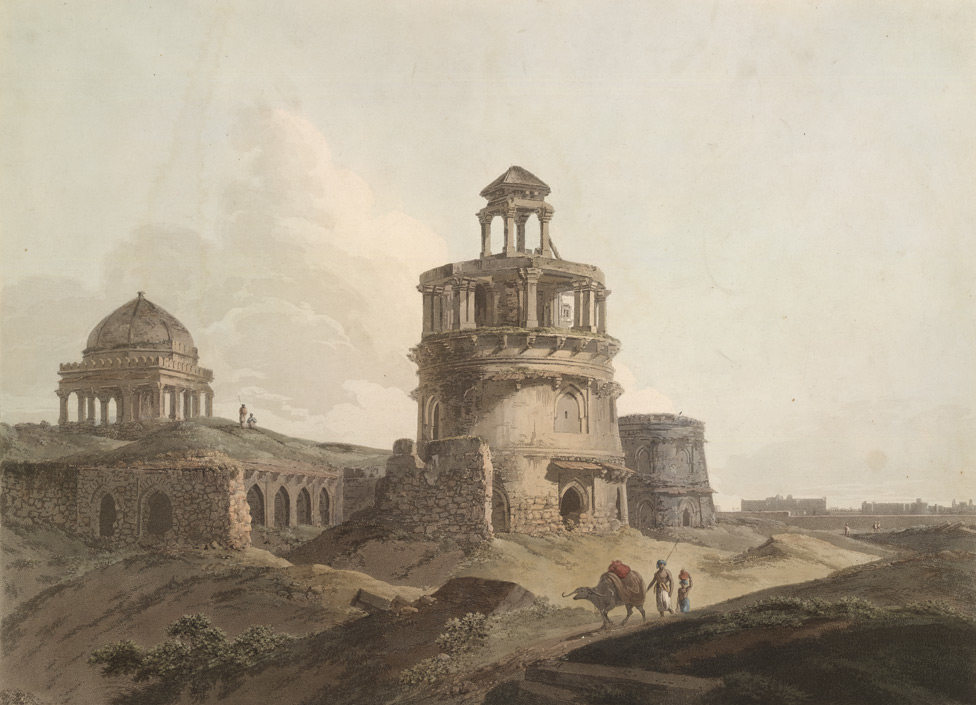
Feroze Shah Kotla ruins, painted in 1802.

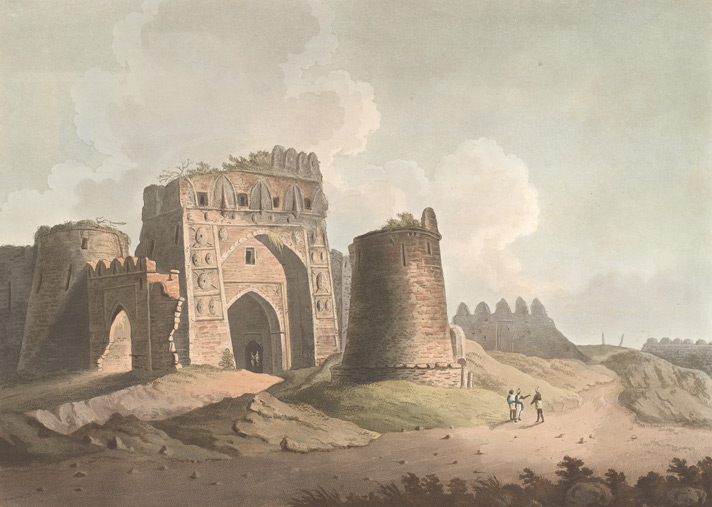
West Gate of Firozabad (present Feroz Shah Kotla), painted in 1802.

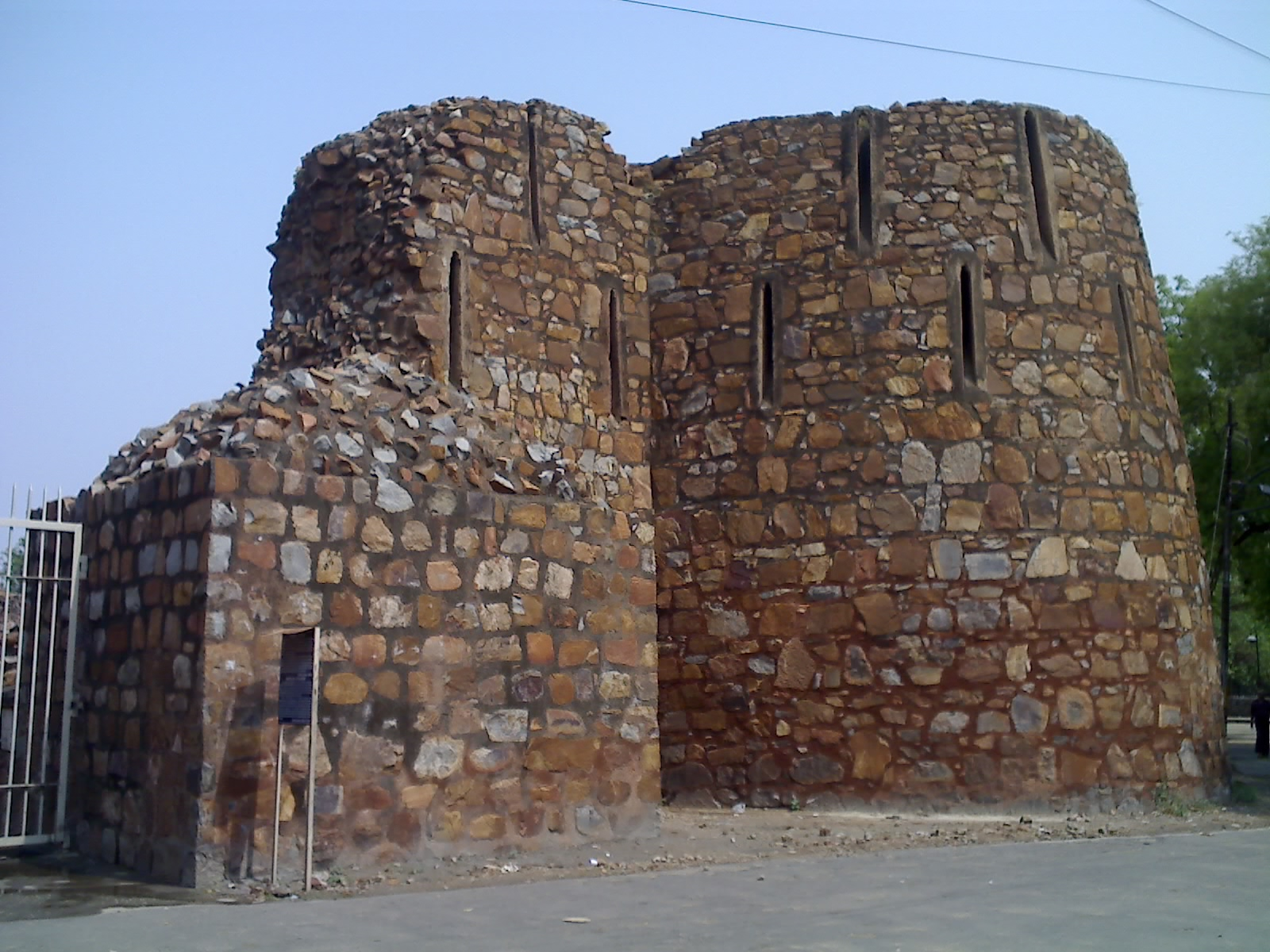
Feroz Shah Kotla remains next to the Feroz Shah Kotla Cricket Stadium.

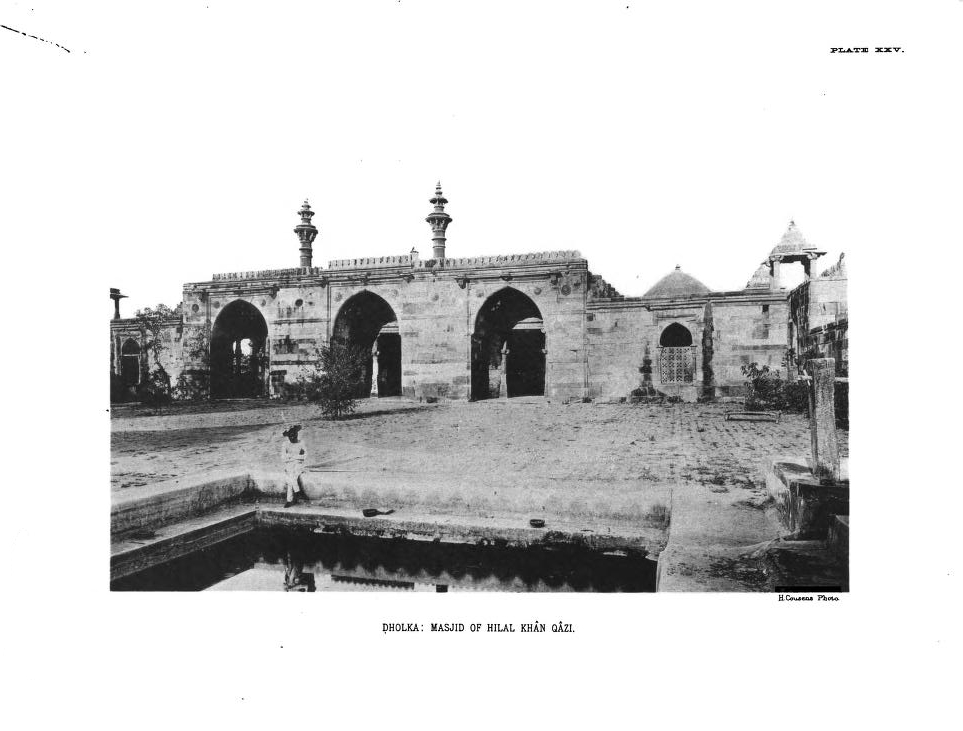
Hilal Khan Ghazi Mosque, located in Dholka, Gujarat.

== Rulers ==
Titular Name	Personal Name	Reign
Sultan Ghiyath-ud-din Tughluq Shah سلطان غیاث الدین تغلق شاہ	Ghazi Malik غازی ملک	1320–1325
Sultan Muhammad Adil bin Tughluq Shah سلطان محمد عادل بن تغلق شاہ; Ulugh Khan الغ خان; Juna Khan جنا خان	Malik Fakhr-ud-din Jauna ملک فخر الدین	1325–1351
Sultan Feroze Shah Tughluq سلطان فیروز شاہ تغلق	Malik Feroze ibn Malik Rajab ملک فیروز ابن ملک رجب	1351–1388
Sultan Ghiyath-ud-din Tughluq Shah سلطان غیاث الدین تغلق شاہ	Tughluq Khan ibn Fateh Khan ibn Feroze Shah تغلق خان ابن فتح خان ابن فیروز شاہ	1388–1389
Sultan Abu Bakr Shah سلطان ابو بکر شاہ	Abu Bakr Khan ibn Zafar Khan ibn Fateh Khan ibn Feroze Shah ابو بکر خان ابن ظفر خان ابن فتح خان ابن فیروز شاہ	1389–1390
Sultan Muhammad Shah سلطان محمد شاہ	Muhammad Shah ibn Feroze Shah محمد شاہ ابن فیروز شاہ	1390–1394
Sultan Ala-ud-din Sikandar Shah سلطان علاءالدین سکندر شاہ	Humayun Khan ھمایوں خان	1394
Sultan Nasir-ud-din Mahmud Shah Tughluq سلطان ناصر الدین محمود شاہ تغلق	Mahmud Shah ibn Muhammad Shah محمود شاہ ابن محمد شاہ	1394–1412/1413
Sultan Nasir-ud-din Nusrat Shah Tughluq سلطان ناصر الدین نصرت شاہ تغلق	Nusrat Khan ibn Fateh Khan ibn Feroze Shah نصرت خان ابن فتح خان ابن فیروز شاہ	1394–1398

- The coloured rows signify the splitting of Delhi Sultanate under two Sultans; one in the east (Orange) at Firozabad & the other in the west (Yellow) at Delhi.

== Popular culture ==
Kesari Veer is a 2025 Indian Hindi-language historical action film directed by Prince Dhiman. The film is co-produced by Rajen Chauhan, Heena Chauhan, Suhraj Chauhan and Ohm Chauhan. Written, co-directed and produced by Kanubhai Chauhan of Chauhan Studios, the film stars Suniel Shetty, Vivek Oberoi, Sooraj Pancholi and Akanksha Sharma. It tells the story of Rajput warrior Hamirji Gohil, who fought against the Tughlaq empire to protect the Somnath Temple from destruction.

== See also ==
- List of Sunni dynasties
- Persianate states
