= Ala ud-din Sikandar Shah =

Sultan of Delhi in 1394

23rd Sultan of Delhi
- Reign: 22 January − 8 March 1394
- Coronation: 1 February 1394
- Predecessor: Nasir ud din Muhammad Shah III
- Successor: Nasir-ud-Din Mahmud Shah Tughluq
- Died: 8 March 1394
- Dynasty: Tughlaq dynasty
- Father: Nasir ud din Muhammad Shah III
- Religion: Islam

Ala ud-din Sikandar Shah I (Persian: علاء الدین سکندر شاه, born Humayun Khan; Persian: همایون خان), was the son of Sultan Muhammad Shah Tughluq. He ascended the imperial throne in virtue of his being heir apparent, as Ala-ud-din Sikandar Shah on 1 February 1394 C.E. He was a pious and devout king who never missed his namaz prayers but after one month and fifteen days he died of natural causes.

His death triggered a succession vacuum for two weeks.

== See also ==
- Delhi Sultanate

| Preceded by Sultan Muhammad Shah Tughluq | Sultan of Delhi; 1394 | Succeeded by Sultan Nasir-ud-din Mahmud Shah Tughluq & Sultan Nasir-ud-din Nusrat Shah Tughluq |
