= Sack of Delhi (1398) =

Timurid sacking of Delhi in 1398

Timurid Sack of Delhi
- Part of Timurid conquests and invasions and campaigns of Timur
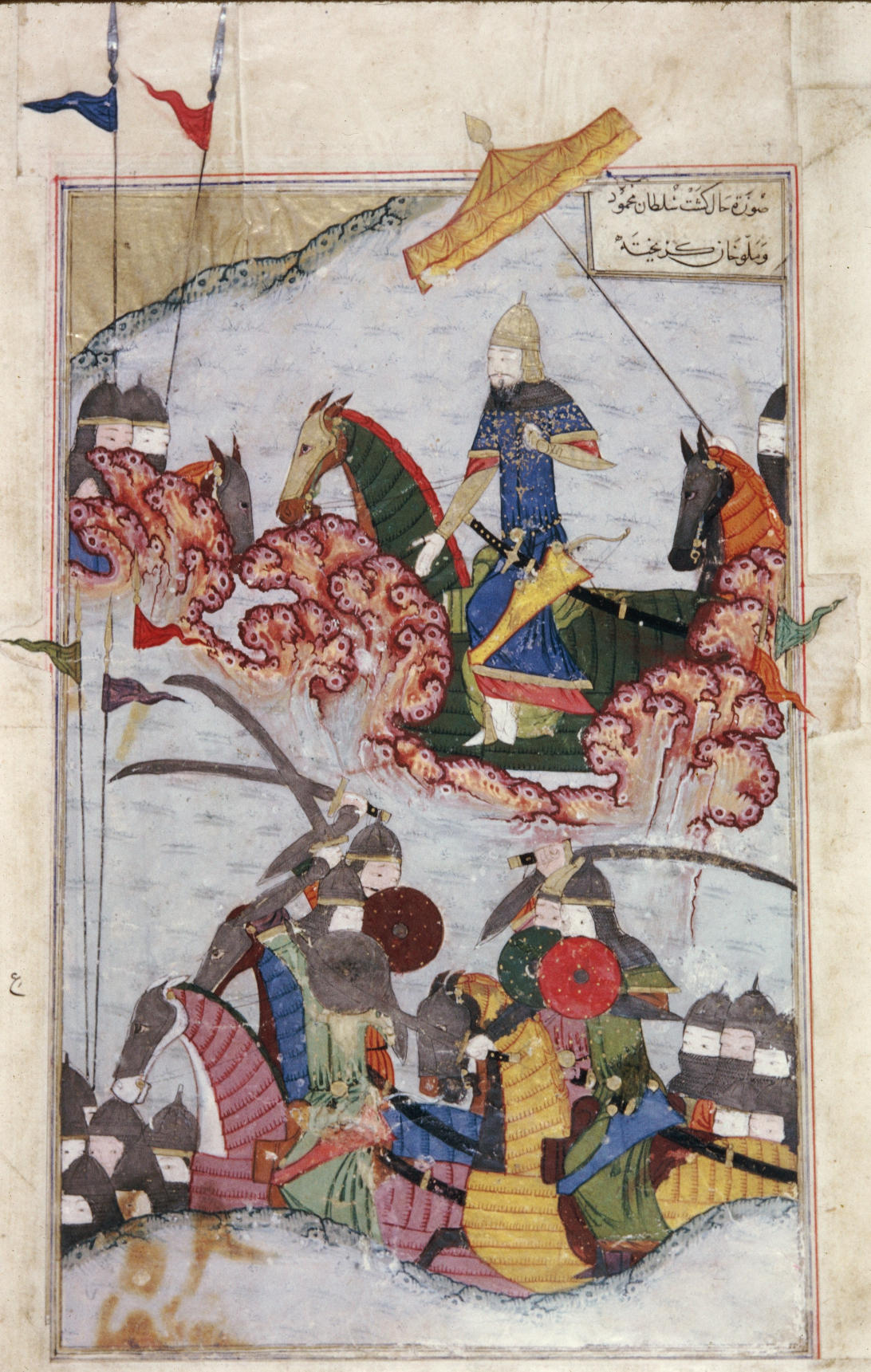
- Timur (top) defeating the Sultan of Delhi, Nasir Al-Din Mahmud Tughluq, in the winter of 1397–1398. Zafarnama (1436).
Date	17–20 December 1398
Location	Delhi, India
Result	Timurid victory

Belligerents
Timurid Empire	Delhi Sultanate

Commanders and leaders
Timur	Mahmud Shah II

Strength
90,000	Unknown

Casualties and losses
Unknown	100,000 civilians killed

The Sack of Delhi took place on 17 December 1398 between Timur – founder of the Timurid Empire – and Nasir-ud-Din Mahmud Shah, the Sultan of Delhi. The Sultan had war elephants among his ranks, something unknown to the steppe warriors at the time. Timur might have had camels loaded with kindling that was set on fire, releasing them to spread panic among the Indian elephants, who then trampled the sultan’s soldiers.

== Background ==
Timur gained power in 1370, he swiftly began engaging in wars and conquering many surrounding nations. While he conquered Persia, and Iraq, a civil war broke out in the Delhi Sultanate and by 1398, there were two rulers who called themselves Sultan: Nasir ud-Din Mahmud Shah Tughlaq, the grandson of Firuz Shah Tughlaq who ruled from Delhi, and Nasir ud-Din Nusrat Shah Tughlaq, another relative of Firuz Shah Tughlaq who ruled from Firozabad, which was a few miles from Delhi. Timur who had heard about this quickly turned his eye on Delhi knowing about the rich wealth of India. Timur had begun preparations and mobilization for his next campaign. While Timur had no intention of ruling over India or interest in an Indian empire, he certainly had an interest in the massive amount of wealth that India had.

== Prelude ==
In 1398, Timur gathered an army of over 90,000 to invade India with. On 30 September 1398, Timur crossed the Indus River and reached Tulamba where he sacked the city and massacred its inhabitants. In October, he reached Multan and then captured the city. Most of his invasion faced no fighting and almost no resistance by the Indians, as they were already weakened and had not mobilized properly.

== Battle ==
Sultan Nasir-ud-Din Mahmud Shah Tughluq and Mallu Iqbal had made preparations in Delhi to face Timur, their army consisted of war elephants with chain mail and poison on their tusks. But Timur was a strategist and devised a plan, he dug trenches around his cavalry units, as he had gathered that horses were easily frightened by elephants. In most cases, commanders dug trenches to protect infantry from cavalry yet Timur did the opposite, which boosted the morale of his army. Timur also knew that elephants panic easily, Timur loaded hay and wood onto the camels. The camels ran towards the war elephants. While the elephants were panicking, Timur and his army began to shoot arrows and catapults pots filled with inflammable liquids. The Delhi army was poisoned by their own elephants, Timur then set loose of his main army and charged at Delhi's army, and Timur's horsemen destroyed what was left of Sultan Nasir-ud-Din Mahmud Shah Tughluq's army. The city was sacked to ruins, and the population was enslaved.

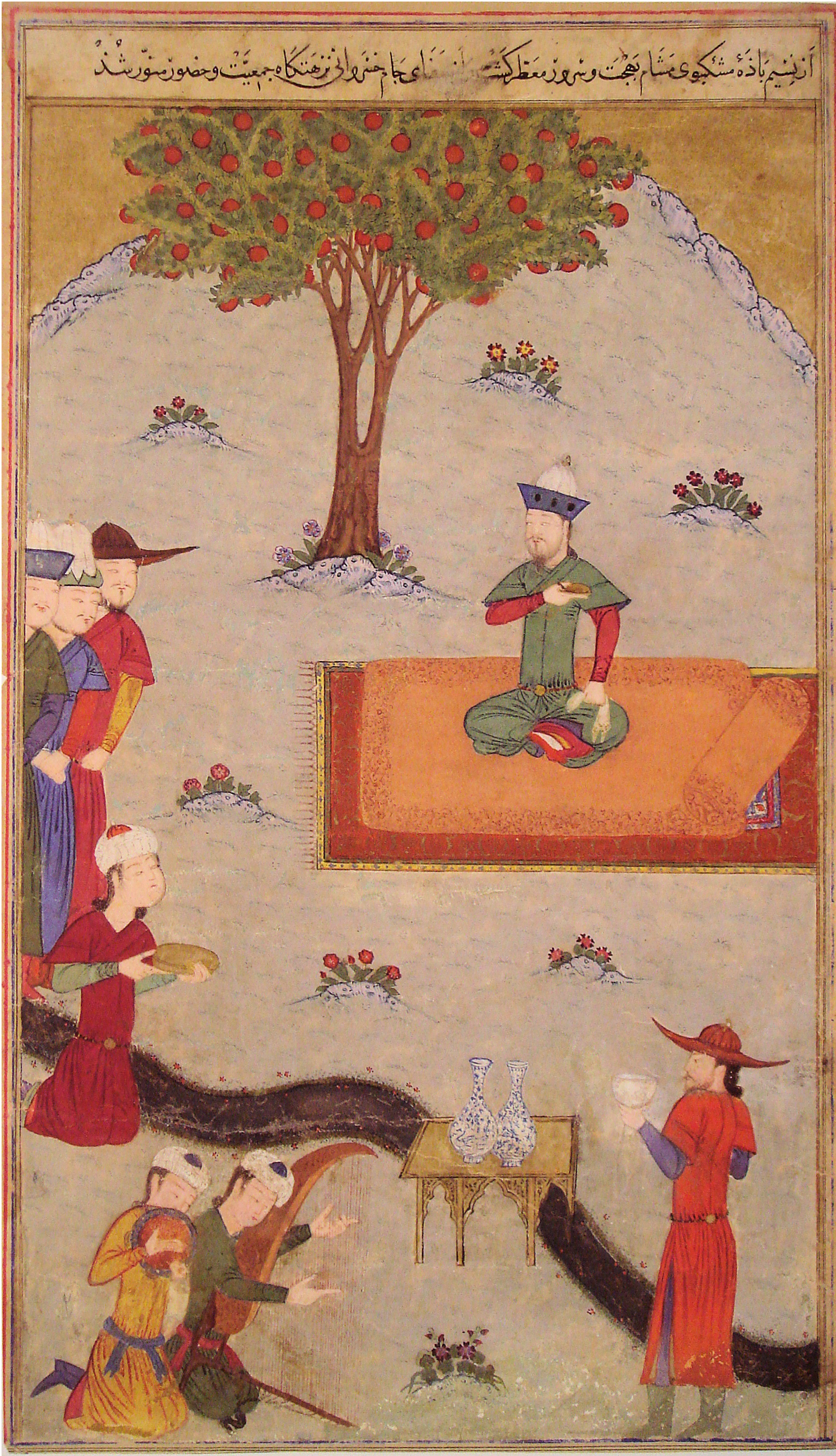
Timur Celebrates his Conquest of Delhi in 1398. Zafarnama of Ibrahim Sultan, Timurid Shiraz, 1436

After the capture of the Sultanate's capital Delhi, the people unsatisfied of Timur began to revolt. It lasted for three days, and the army left the decomposing bodies to give "food to the birds".

== See also ==
- Timurid conquests and invasions
