= Mahmud Shah II =

Sultan of Delhi from 1394 to 1413

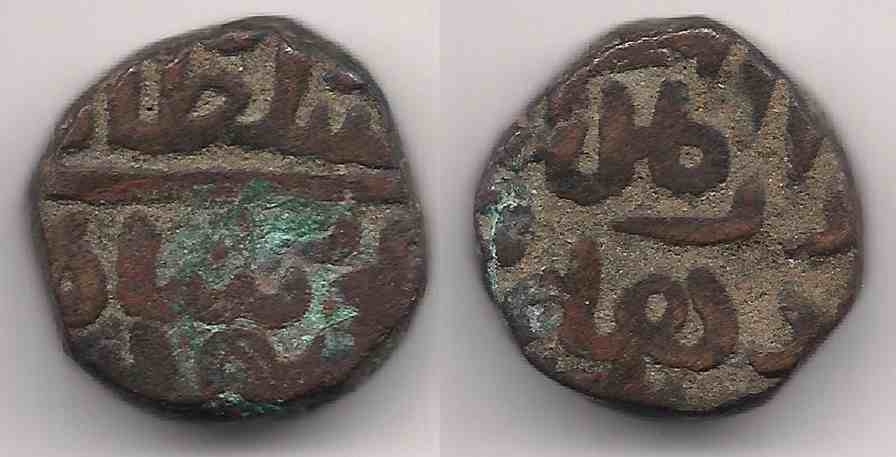
- Copper Falus

24th Sultan of Delhi
- Reign: 23 March 1394 – February 1413
- Predecessor: Ala ud-din Sikandar Shah
- Successor: Khizr Khan
- Born: unknown
- Died: February 1413
- Dynasty: Tughlaq
- Father: Muhammad Shah III
- Religion: Islam

Nasir-ud-Din Mahmud Shah II (Persian: ناصر الدین محمود شاه; d. February 1413), also known as Nasiruddin Mohammad Shah, was the last sultan of the Tughlaq dynasty to rule the Delhi Sultanate.

== History ==
=== War of succession with Nusrat Shah ===
Nasiruddin Mahmud was a son of sultan Nasir ud din Muhammad Shah III, who ruled the Delhi Sultanate from 31 August 1390 to 20 January 1394. Upon his death, his older son Ala ud-din Sikandar Shah became sultan, but he soon died of illness on 8 March 1394, and his younger brother Nasiruddin Mahmud succeeded him. However, the succession was challenged by his relative Nusrat Shah (also known as Nasrat Khan), triggering a war of succession that lasted for three years from 1394 until 1397. During this time, Nasiruddin Mahmud ruled from the city of Delhi, while Nusrat Shah ruled from Firozabad.

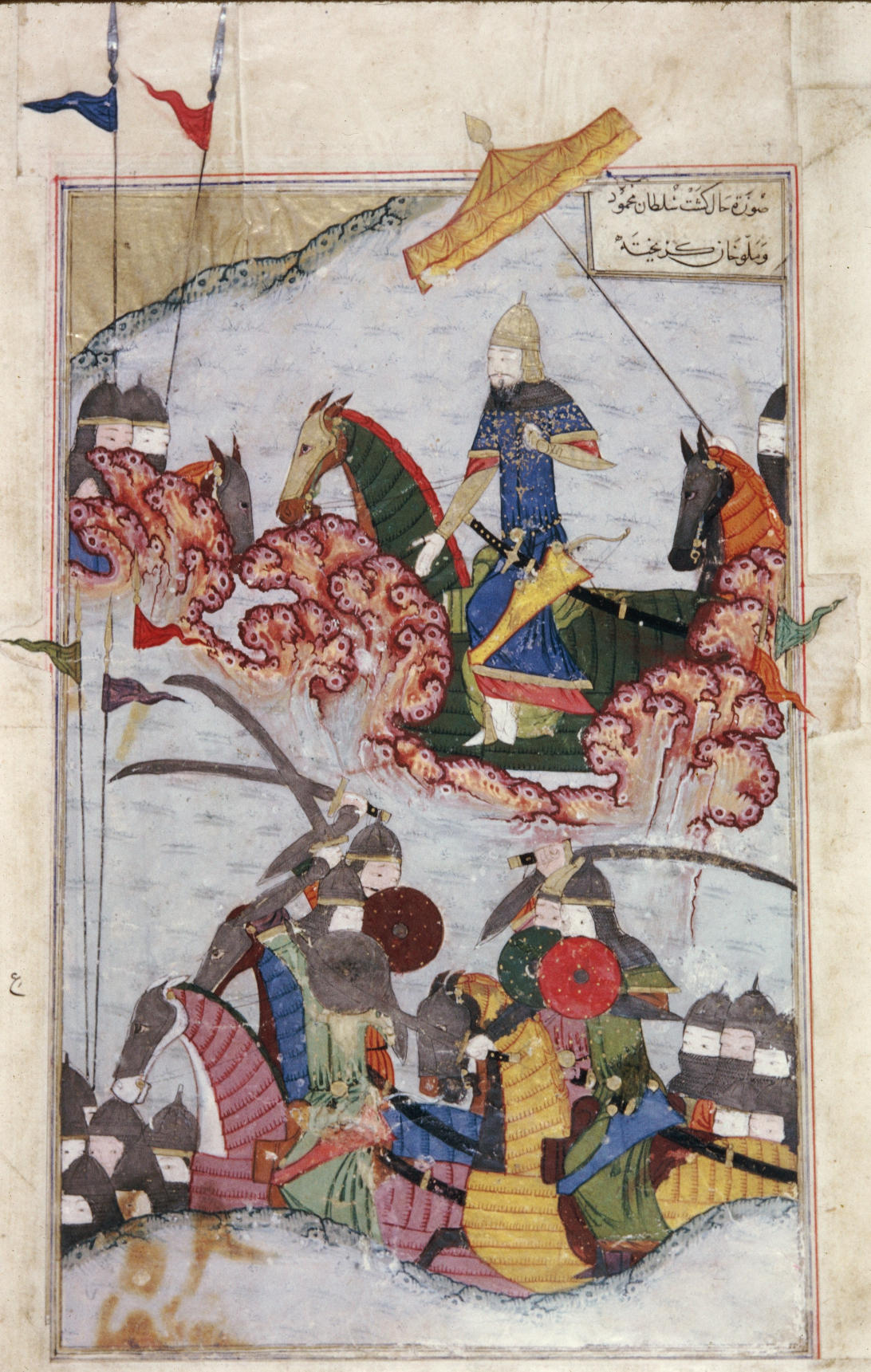
Timur (top) defeating the Sultan of Delhi, Nasir Al-Din Mahmud Tughluq, in the winter of 1397–1398. Zafarnama (1436).

=== Invasion of Timur ===
During Nasiruddin Mahmud's reign in 1398, Timur Barlas the Trans-oxanian ruler invaded India. They clashed in a decisive battle near Delhi. Timur eventually won and entered the city where he then massacred the population. He obtained a substantial number of treasures from the Delhi court that was accumulated by the Turco-Afghan predecessors over a period of 192 years (1206 CE-1398 CE). Soon after the invasion by Timur, the Tughlaq dynasty fell into decline and eventually came to an end. The Timurids took much of the wealth away from Delhi such as gold back to their capital of Samarkand. This resulted in the significant weakening of the Delhi Sultanate and many regions of the sultanate began to declare their independence such as the Gujarat Sultanate under Muzaffar Shah I in Gujarat, the Khokhars under Shaikha Khokhar in Punjab, the Bengal Sultanate under Ghiyasuddin Azam Shah in Bengal, the Jaunpur Sultanate under Malik Sarwar in Awadh and Mewat State under Khanzada Bahadur Khan in Mewat. Due to these regions breaking away, the Delhi Sultanate shrunk significantly and began to weaken.

=== Successor ===
Nasir-ud-Din Mahmud Shah Tughluq died in February 1413. The succeeding sultan of the Delhi Sultanate was Khizr Khan, the first of the Sayyid dynasty. Khizr Khan was the governor of Multan and was appointed as the Sultan of Delhi by Timur himself. Khizr Khan had to pay tribute however to the Timurids at Samarkand.

Preceded by Nasir ud din Muhammad Shah III	Sultan of Delhi; 1394 – 1413	Succeeded by Khizr Khan, Sayyid dynasty
