= Nasir-ud-din Nusrat Shah Tughluq =

Medieval Indian ruler

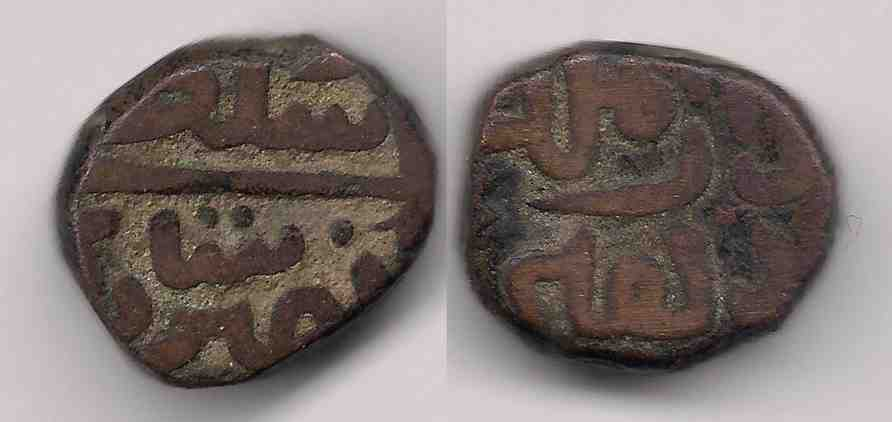
Falus of Dar al-Mulk Dehli

Sultan Nasir-ud-din Nusrat Shah, was a claimant to the throne of Delhi during the rule of Mahmud Shah II. He was the son of Fath Khan, and during the reign of Mahmud II, he was brought forward from Mewat to the royal palace at Firozabad and put forward as a claimant to the throne. Parts of the Doaba, Patiala, Panipat, Sonipat, Rohtak and Jhajjar were under the control of Nasir ud-din Nusrat Shah while Sultan Mahmud only controlled the two forts (Old Delhi and Siri).
