= Pir Ghaib Hunting Lodge and Observatory =

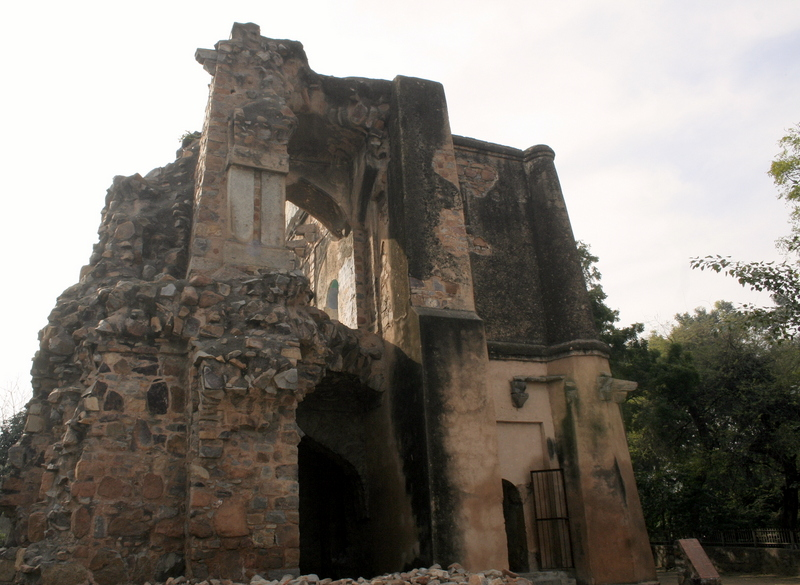
- Pir Ghaib

- Location within Delhi

General information
- Architectural style: Indo-Islamic
- Location: Delhi, India
- Coordinates: 28.676°N 77.213°E

Pir Ghaib Hunting Lodge and Observatory is a medieval heritage structure in Delhi, India. It is believed to be built by Sultan Firuz Shah Tughlaq of the Delhi Sultanate in the 14th century. Standing two storeys tall, similar to other contemporaneous counterparts of the Tughlaq era architecture, it is made up of rubble. The building has a hollow masonry cylinder, which is believed to have been used for astronomical purposes. Apart from its theorised uses as a hunting lodge and observatory, it is also believed to have been used as a clock tower

== Etymology ==
The monument's original name was Khushk-i-Shikar (hunting lodge). Its current name, Pir Ghaib, literally means "the saint who vanished". This refers to the popular story of an Muslim saint, who had occupied a part of the building (two chambers, to be precise) after it had been abandoned by the rulers, vanishing into thin air towards the end of his life. Owing to this miracle, he came to be known as "Pir Ghaib" (the saint who vanished), and is still revered today by a few localities.

== History ==
The monument and the stepwell adjacent to it were built by Sultan Firuz Shah Tughlaq in the year 1351 AD. The hunting lodge, along with an enclosure for game animals, was built by the Sultan following the death of his favorite son, Fateh Khan, to help him divert his mind by partaking in hunting.
