= Firuz Shah Tughlaq =

Sultan of Delhi from 1351 to 1388

- Firuz Shah ibn Malik Rajab
- Photograph of an Indian miniature, Firuz Shah Tughlaq is depicted making Dua

19th Sultan of Delhi Tughluq Emperor
- Reign: 23 March 1351 – 20 September 1388
- Predecessor: Muhammad bin Tughluq
- Successor: Tughluq Khan
- Born: c. 1309
- Died: 20 September 1388 (aged 78–79); Delhi, Delhi Sultanate (modern-day New Delhi, India)
- Burial: 20 September 1388; Tughlaq tombs, Delhi
- Consort: Gurjari Begum
- Issue: Firuz Khan (Note: Father of Fateh Khan and grandfather of Tughluq Khan); Zafar Khan; Shadi Khan; Muhammad Shah; A daughter (Note: Married to Shihabu'd-Din Shah, Sultan of Kashmir)
Regnal name
- Al-Sultān al-Āzam Saīf Amīr al-Mu'minīn Abu'l Muzaffar Nāsir al-Dunya wa'l-Dīn Firūz Shāh al-Sultānī (Note: السلطان الاعظم سیف امیر المومنین ابوالمظفر ناصر الدنیا والدین فیروز شاہ السلطانی lit. 'The Great Sultan, Sword of the Commander of the Faithful, Father of the Victorious, Helper of the World and the Faith, Firuz Shah, the Sultan')
- Dynasty: Tughlaq
- Father: Malik Rajab
- Mother: Bibi Naila
- Religion: Sunni Islam (Hanafi)

Nasir al-Din Firuz Shah (Persian: ناصر الدین فیروز شاہ; 1309 – 20 September 1388), better known as Firuz Shah Tughlaq (Persian: فیروز شاه تغلق, romanized: Firūz Shāh Tug͟hlaq) and also as Firuz III, was the Sultan of Delhi from 1351 until his death in 1388. He succeeded his cousin Muhammad bin Tughlaq following the latter's death at Thatta, Sindh. His father was Sipahsalar Malik Rajab, the brother of Ghiyath al-Din Tughluq, the founder of the dynasty, whilst his mother was a princess originating from Abohar, Punjab of the Indian subcontinent.

Firuz Shah has been accredited with the construction of cities and irrigation projects and has been regarded as a great builder with the creation of Firozpur, Hisar and Fatehabad in the Punjab and Haryana regions. Firuz Shah's reign was met with numerous conquests such as the Raja's of Bengal, Sindh and Kangra later in his reign, whilst upon receiving the throne, it has been noted that he successfully repelled a Mongol attack.

== Background ==
The Tarikh-i-Firuz Shahi is one of the main sources of information regarding the sultan's background, early life, and the origins of his parents. According to the interpretation, Ghiyath al-Din Tughluq wanted his brother, Sipahsalar Rajab, to marry one of the Rai of Dipalpur's daughters in Punjab. He was later informed of the daughter of Rana Mall Bhatti called Bibi Naila. Ghiyath al-Din Tughluq sent a proposal of marriage to the Rai, however he declined, leading the Sultan to demand the payment of a year's revenue from them and causing hardship to the people for three days. Bibi Naila's mother was written to have been distraught by the severity caused by Ghiyath al-Din Tughluq, and Bibi Naila accepted his proposal to alleviate the situation. Upon marrying Sipahsalar Rajab, her name was changed to Sultan Bibi Kadbanu. When Firuz Shah was seven years old, his father Sipahsalar Rajab had died and was then raised by Ghiyath al-Din Tughluq. The addition of 'Tughlaq' to his name has been reported to have been a modern alteration out of convenience, and that Persian and contemporary sources only used the name 'Firuz Shah' when referring to him.

Ghiyath al-Din Tughluq mentored Firuz Shah and Muhammad bin Tughluq in the handling of affairs of the state and the duties and functions held by the royalty. When he was 14, Ghiyath al-Din Tughluq succeeded to the throne of Delhi, and Firuz travelled with the sultan, learning the arts of public affairs. Upon Muhammad bin Tughluq's succession to the throne, Firuz Shah, now around 16, had assumed the rank of 'deputy of the lord chamberlain' (Naib-i Amir Hajib) with the title of Naib Barbak, commanding twelve thousand horses.

== Reign ==
Upon Muhammad bin Tughluq's death, Firuz Shah succeeded the throne on 23 March 1351, on the banks of the Sindh. According to the Tarikh-i-Firuz Shahi, a group of Mongols had plundered a baggage train and advanced to Firuz's camp leading to a battle wherein the latter was victorious, and the captives taken by the Mongols set free. The defeated Mongols fled back to their camps in their own countries, securing Firuz Shah's first victory as emperor. During this time it was thought by the Khwaja-i-Jahan of the empire through misinformed intelligence that Firuz Shah was missing and presumed dead, causing him to place Mahmud, an alleged imposter son of Muhammad bin Tughluq on the throne but upon finding out that Firuz was alive he gathered an army of twenty thousand at Delhi until peace was made. Firuz hearing of this unanimously agreed with his nobles that Muhammad bin Tughluq had only one daughter and thence marched through Multan, Dipalpur and Ajodhan, gathering a large army of soldiers, nobles, and commoners from these cities for his march to Delhi, including thirty six Rajas of this region; he also completed a pilgrimage to the tomb of Baba Farid. According to this same tradition, whilst marching to Delhi, Firuz received a son, naming him Fateh Khan and founded the town of Fatehabad after him at the place of his birth. The Khawaja-i-Jahan had set to Fatehabad and plead with Firuz for his mistake, securing Firuz's rule.

=== Attempted regicide ===
A daughter of Ghiyath al-Din Tughluq, Khudawand-zada, alongside her husband, conspired to murder Firuz when he came to visit her next. It was a custom of Firuz Shah to visit Khudawand-zada after Friday prayers. However, after seeing hidden signals being made on his visit, he left her palace and took a sword from a Rai Chirhu Bhatti, one of his nobles. He then confronted her and demanded her immediate retirement and exiled her husband.

=== Conquests ===
==== Invasions of Bengal ====
In 1353, Firuz Shah set to invade the region of Bengal ruled by Shamsuddin Ilyas Shah and camped on the banks of the Kosi River with over 70,000 men. During this time the ruler of Gorakhpur submitted to Firuz and paid a tribute of over 20,000 Tankas. Firuz Shah's army crossed the Kosi River causing Shamsuddin Ilyas Shah to flee with his army to Ekdala, West Bengal. He soon after besieged the city but feigned a retreat leading Shamsuddin Ilyas Shah to leave the city with his army to harass the Sultan's retreat. The sultan's army was secretly split into three divisions led by Tatar Khan, Malik Dillan and Malik Hisam Nawa and an assault was led on the Bengal army causing 180,000 casualties to Shamsuddin Ilyas Shah's forces and his eventual retreat. Tatar Khan attempted to persuade Firuz to annex Bengal however he declined, stating that previous Delhi sultans had annexed it however it was not prudent due to the marshy lands of the region. Two years after the invasion of Bengal, Firuz built the city of Hisar and before his second invasion constructed the city of Firozabad on the banks of the Yamuna river.

Preceding Firuz's second invasion, the king of Sonargaon was killed by Shamsuddin Ilyas Shah and his son-in-law Zafar Khan had fled to the court of Firuz in Hisar with preparations soon made in Delhi to avenge Zafar Khan's claims. Shamsuddin Ilyas Shah upon hearing of Firuz Shah's preparations for war, had fled from Ekdala to Sonargaon, deeper in Bengal for a more secure position. Firuz had amassed an army of 70,000 men and marched towards Bengal in 1358, creating the city of Jaunpur named after the second sultan of the Tughlaq dynasty, Muhammad bin Tughluq, during his expedition. Simultaneously, Shamsuddin Ilyas Shah died and was succeeded by his son Sikandar Shah who was then to be besieged at Ekdala by the Delhi army. The outcome of the war led to the creation of a peace treaty with Sikandar Shah under the condition that Zafar Khan was to regain his dominion in Sonargaon which was accepted, both Firuz Shah and Sikandar Shah would send gifts including elephants and horses to commemorate the treaty.

==== Odisha campaign ====
On the return from Bengal, Firuz Shah was met with conflict from the Rai of Jajpur, modern day Odisha and in 1360 invaded the region taking prisoners and spoils of war, such as horses and cattle; meanwhile the Rai of Odisha had surrendered and promised an annual tribute of 20 elephants.

==== Conquest of Kangra ====
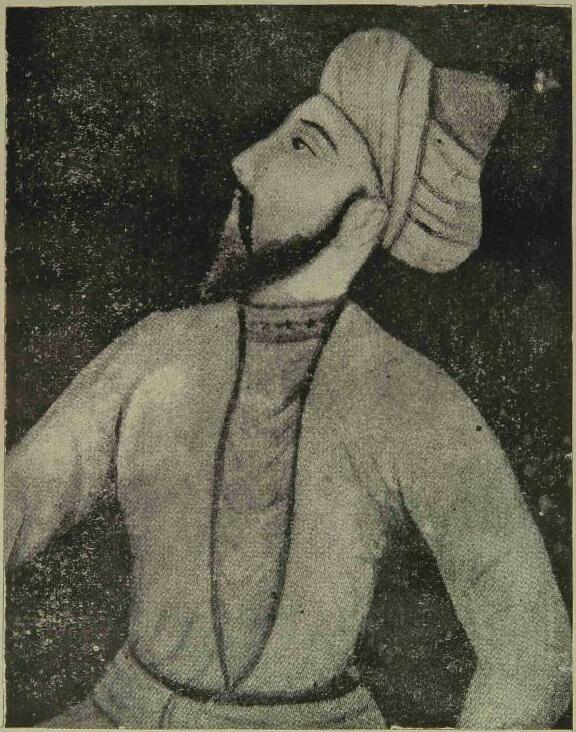
Painting of Sultan Firuz Shah Tughlaq. Kept in the collection of the Raza Library Rampur.

Firuz had received reports that the Rai of Kangra had raided his kingdom and plundered some of his districts, causing his march to Nagarkot. Whilst passing through the city of Sirhind, he built a canal connecting the Sarasvati River with the Markanda River and constructed a fort named Firuzpur. The Rai of Kangra secured himself in a fort at Nagarkot and taking advantage, the Sultan's army had plundered the country of Kangra and besieged the fort of the Rai for 6 months until he surrendered himself, but was permitted to retain his kingdom under the Fiefdom of Firuz.

The Nurpur kingdom centred in Punjab and Himachal Pradesh under Kailas Pal (1353–1397), who ruled alongside Firuz Shah, has been noted as a great ally of the Tughlaq dynasty. It has been written that Tatar Khan, a Khorasani governor, had been defeated with his face slashed by Kailas Pal and was killed by the Gakhars upon his invasion of the Punjab; 5000 Mansabdar was gifted to him as a reward for this victory. Kailas Pal is also stated to have constructed an irrigation channel from the Ravi River to Pathankot. The Nurpur kingdom supposedly converted to Islam during the reign of Firuz Shah according to records and Firuz had also converted the Chauhan Rajputs from Hinduism to Islam.

==== Conquest of Thatta ====
In 1362, Firuz Shah set for Thatta, modern day Sindh, with 90,000 horses and 480 elephants whilst collecting a large fleet of boats to accompany the army down the Indus River for his conquest. Firuz's horses suffered a great disease which wiped out three quarters of his force and he decided to retreat to Gujarat to regain his strength and gather more horses. During the retreat, his army lacked food and his soldiers began to starve, the situation further worsened after 'treacherous guides' had led them to where there was no fresh water, causing some of their executions which induced the rest of the guides to lead the army to the fertile plains of Gujarat. In 1363, Firuz, after re-strengthening his forces, continued his expedition launching a surprise assault on Thatta, which inclined the people who were tilling their lands to apply a scorched earth policy, destroying their fields and taking shelter in mud forts west of the Indus. Firuz dispatched two of his garrisons to cross the river and besiege the town but without much luck they were forced to retreat and gather more forces from Delhi. During this time the Delhi army reaped the crops from the conquered lands, replenishing food supplies whilst starving out the forces of Thatta causing the rulers to submit to Firuz with an annual tribute of 400,000 Tankas to be sent to Delhi.

=== Death ===
Firuz Shah had abdicated the throne to his son Muhammad Shah III in 1387 but after devoting his rule to pleasure and abstaining from royal duties, the Delhi nobles had set out against Muhammed causing Firuz to confer the royal titles upon his great-grandson, Tughluq Khan, the son of his deceased grandson and previously presumed heir, Fateh Khan, who died in 1376. However, in 1388, Firuz died at the age of 78 or 79 after a rule of 37 years. His tomb is located in Hauz Khas, Delhi, close to the tank built by Alauddin Khalji and attached to the tomb is a madrasa built by Firuz in 1352–53.

== Administrative policies ==
Firuz was a Sufi Muslim who tried to uphold the laws of Islam and adopted Sharia policies. He made a number of important concessions to theologians. He tried to ban practices that the orthodox theologians considered un-Islamic, an example being his prohibition of the practice of Muslim women going out to worship at the graves of saints. He persecuted a number of sects that were considered heretical by the Muslim theologians. Firuz took to heart the mistakes made during his cousin Muhammad's rule. He recognised the Deccan's independence and was indiscriminately benevolent and lenient as a sultan.

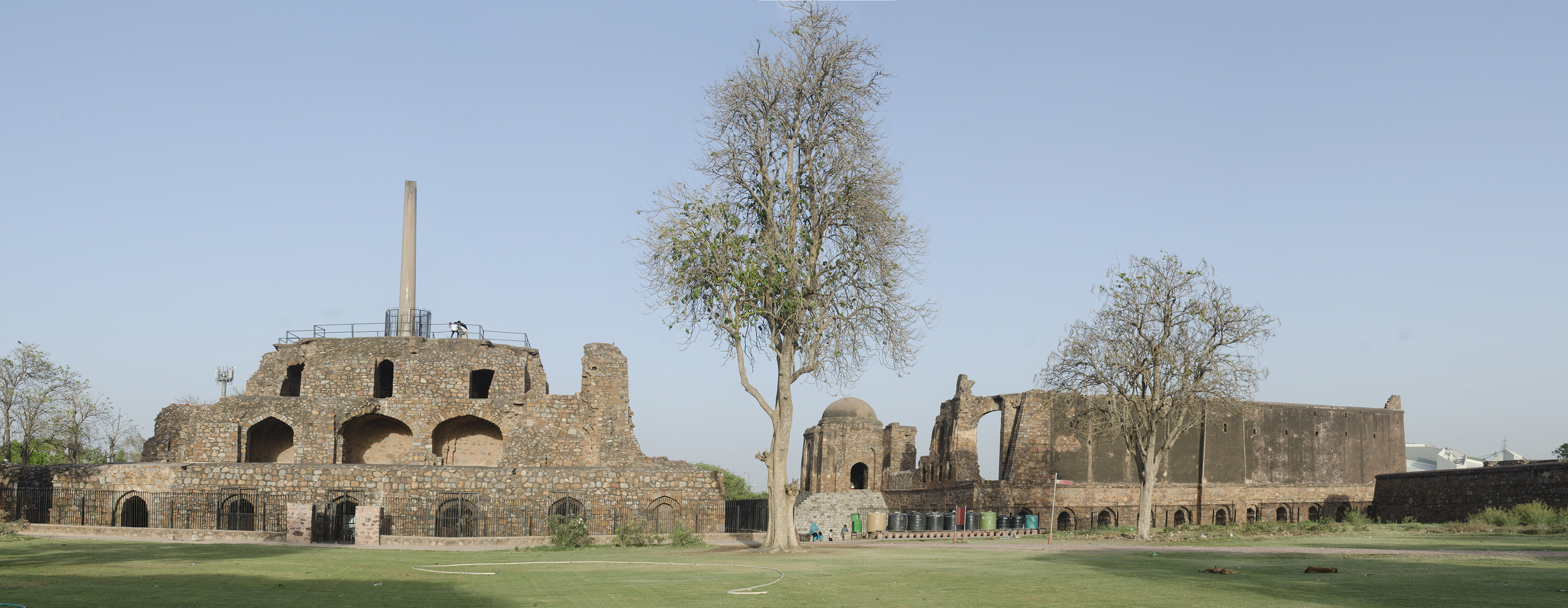
Palace of Feroz Shah Kotla, topped by the Ashokan Delhi-Topra pillar (left) and Jamia Masjid (right).

Rather than awarding position based on merit, Firuz allowed a noble's son to succeed to his father's position and jagir after his death. The same was done in the army, where an old soldier could send his son, son-in-law or even his slave in his place. He increased the salary of the nobles. He stopped all kinds of harsh punishments such as cutting off hands. He also lowered the land taxes that Muhammad had raised. Firuz's reign has been described as the greatest age of corruption in medieval India: He once gave a golden tanka to a distraught soldier so that he could bribe the clerk to pass his sub-standard horse.

Firoz Shah's reign was marked by both administrative reforms and aggressive religious policies aimed at consolidating Islamic rule in India. A devout Muslim, he is known for his efforts to enforce Sharia law, which included persecution of Hindus and destruction of their religious institutions. Firuz renovated Surya kund in the Dakshinaarka sun temple of Gaya and acknowledged its greatness. It has an inscription mentioning his name twice.

=== Infrastructure and education ===
Firuz instituted economic policies to increase the material welfare of his people. Many rest houses (sarai), gardens and tombs (Tughluq tombs) were built. He commissioned many public buildings in Delhi. He built the Firoz Shah Palace Complex at Hisar in 1354, over 300 villages and dug five major canals, including the renovation of the Prithviraj Chauhan era Western Yamuna Canal, for irrigation bringing more land under cultivation for growing grain and fruit. Firoz Shah founded several cities around Delhi, including Jaunpur, Firozpur, Hissar, Hansi, Firozabad, Fatehabad. Most of Firozabad was destroyed as subsequent rulers dismantled its buildings and reused the spolia as building materials, and the rest was subsumed as New Delhi grew. When the Qutb Minar was struck by lightning in 1368, knocking off its top storey, he replaced them with the existing two floors, faced with red sandstone and white marble. One of his hunting lodges, Shikargah, also known as Kushak Mahal, is situated within the Teen Murti Bhavan complex, Delhi. The nearby Kushak Road is named after it, as is the Tughlaq Road further on. He brought two Ashokan Pillars from Meerut, and a Topra near Radaur in Yamunanagar district of Haryana, carefully cut and wrapped in silk, to Delhi in bullock cart trains. He re-erected one of them on the roof of his palace at Firuz Shah Kotla.

Hindu religious works were translated from Sanskrit to Persian and Arabic. He had a large personal library of manuscripts in Persian, Arabic and other languages. A number of madrasas were opened to encourage the religious education of Muslims. He set up hospitals for the free treatment of the poor and encouraged physicians in the development of Unani medicine. He provided money for the marriage of girls belonging to poor families under the department of Diwan-i-Khairat.

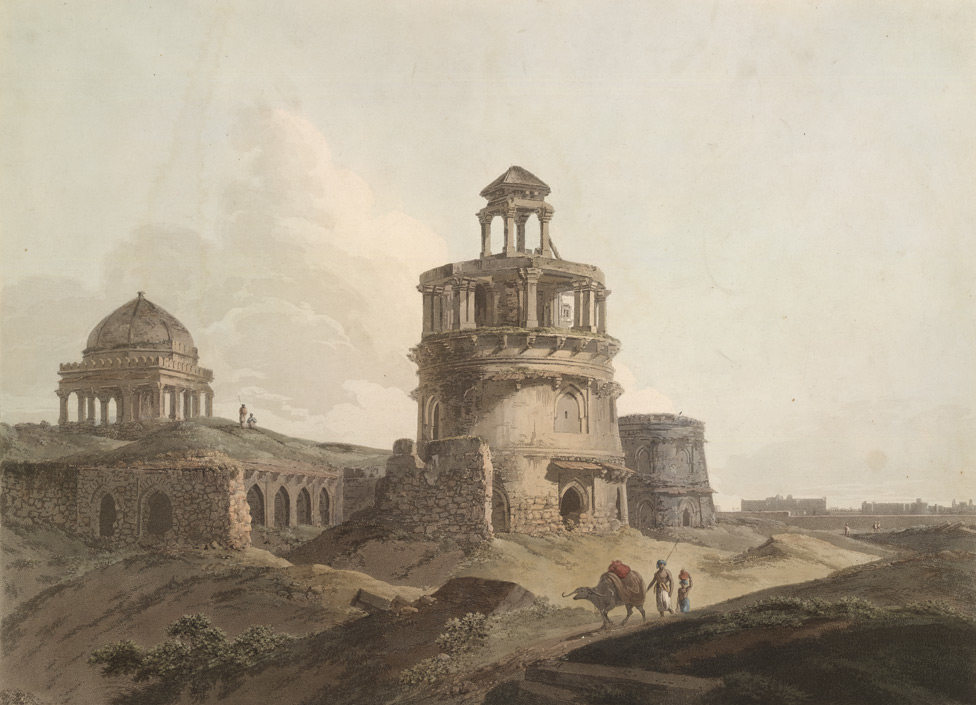
Remains of buildings at Firoz Shah Kotla, Delhi, 1795.

== Coin gallery ==
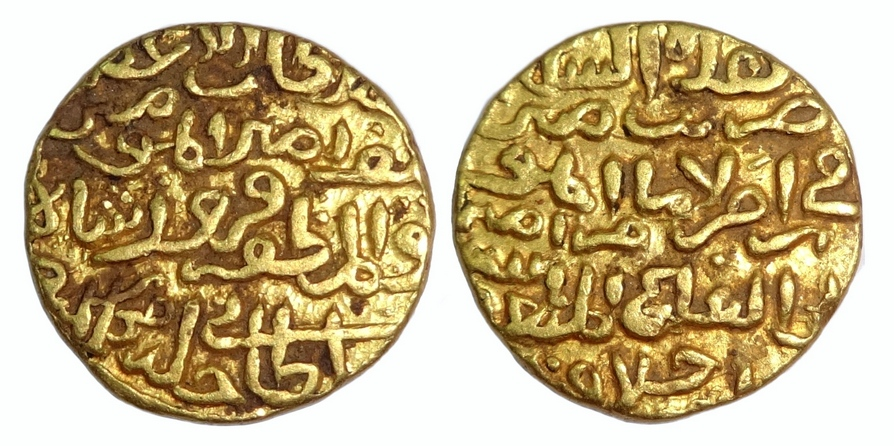
Gold tanka of Firuz Shah

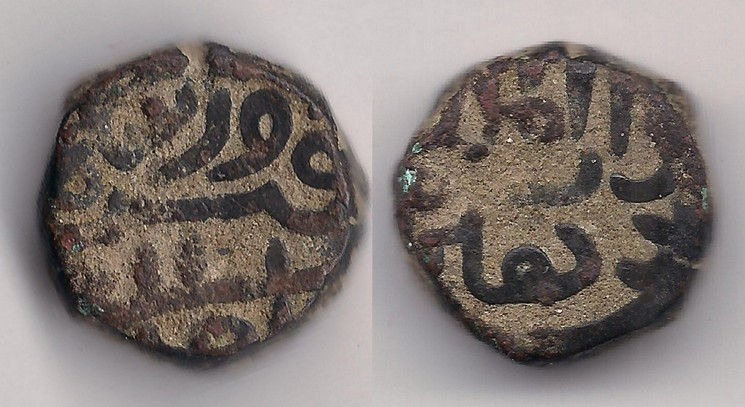
Jital of 40 Rati

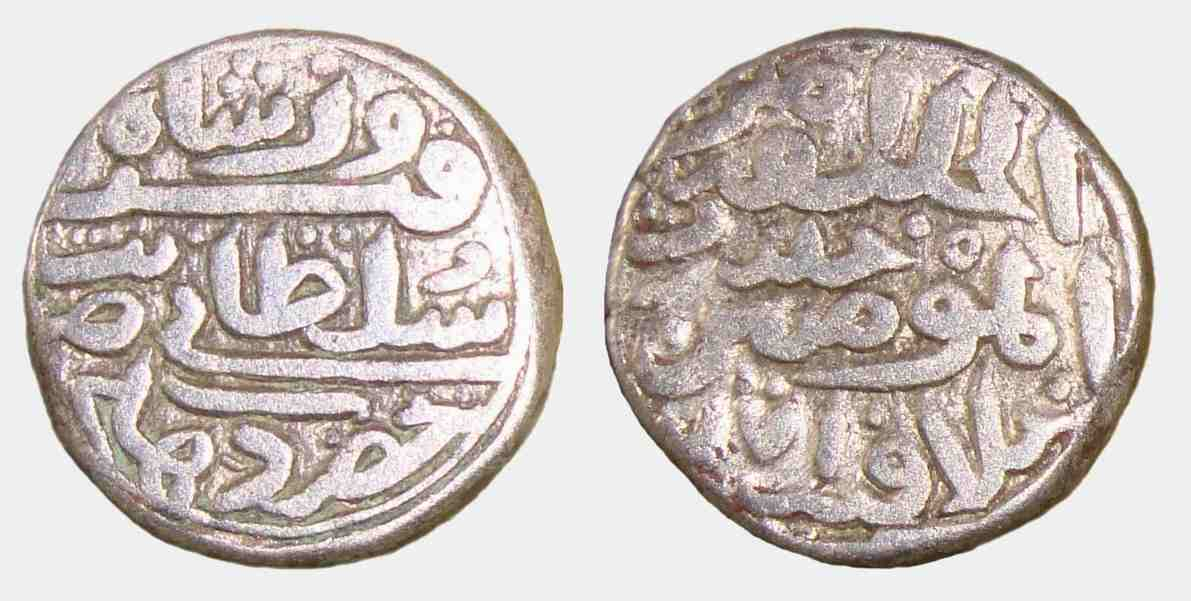
Billon Tanka of Hazrat Dehli Dated AH 771

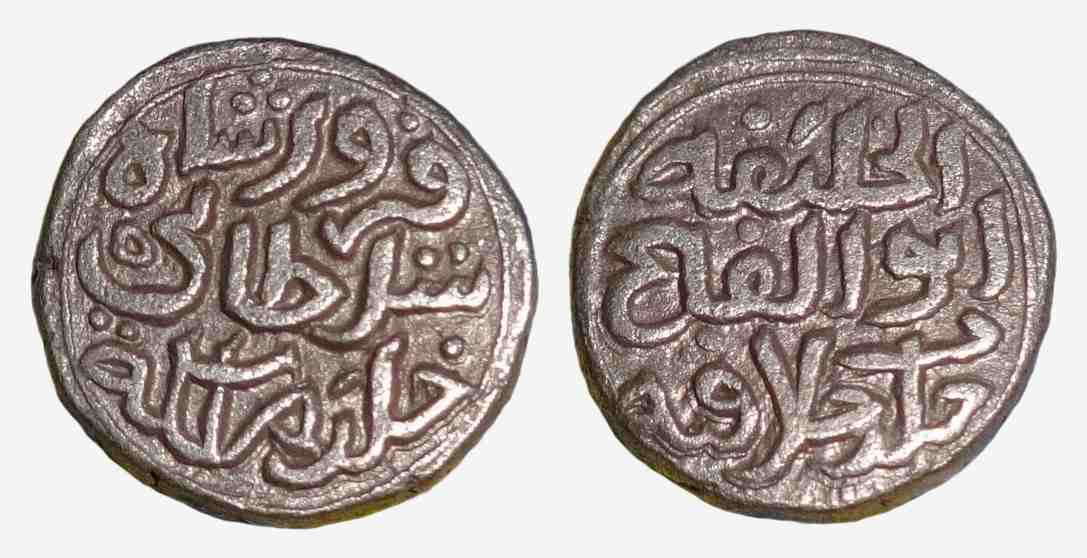
Coin of 32 Rati

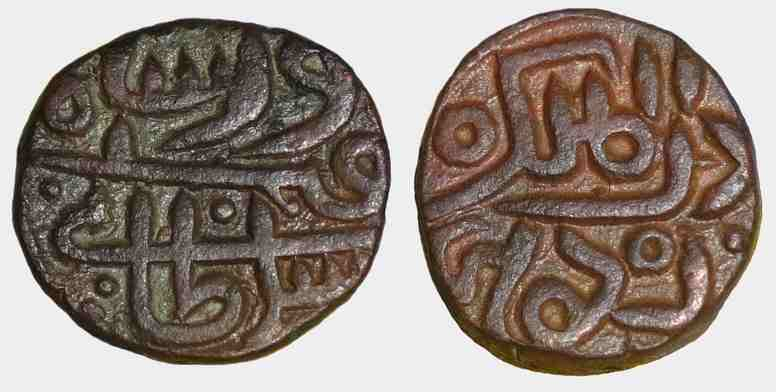
Jital of 40 Rati

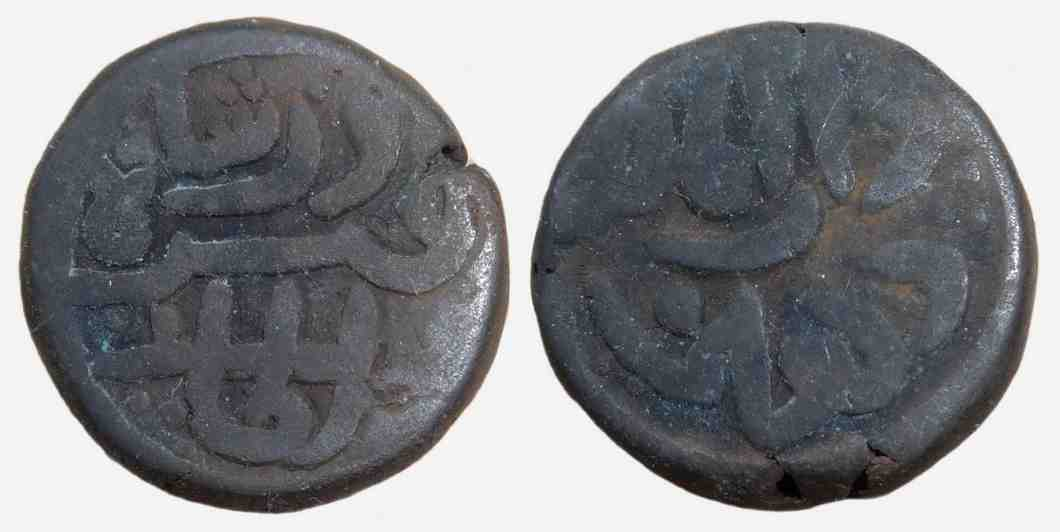
Jital of 40 Rati

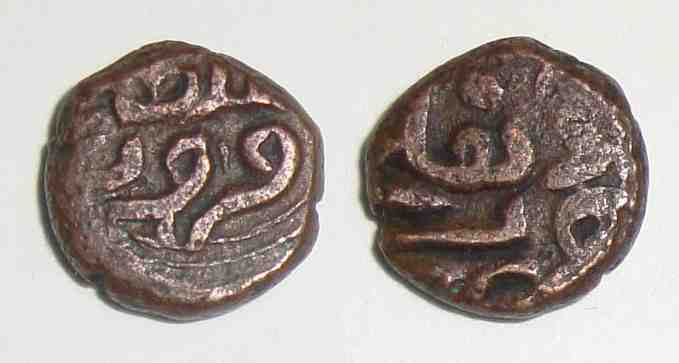
Jital of Firoz Shah

== Notes ==
Preceded by Muhammad bin Tughlaq	Sultan of Delhi; 1351–1388	Succeeded by Ghiyas-ud-Din Tughlaq II
