= Topra Kalan =

Topra
- Village
- Location in Haryana, India Topra (Haryana)
- Coordinates: 30.1252°N 77.1623°E
- Country: India
- State: Haryana
- District: Yamunanagar
- Established: 400 BCE
- Founder: Mauryan Empire

Languages
  - Official: Hindi, Regional Haryanvi
- Time zone: UTC+5:30 (IST)
- Vehicle registration: HR
- Website: haryana.gov.in

Topra, combined name for the larger Topra Kalan and adjacent smaller Topra Khurd, is a Mauryan Empire-era village in Yamunanagar district of Haryana state in India. It lies 14 km west of Yamunanagar, 14 km from Radaur and 90 km from Chandigarh.

== History ==
=== Etymology ===
Earlier the village was named as Nigambondh after Buddha, also likely the Kamasdhamma the place mentioned in Pali texts in the Kuru country where the Buddha delivered three of his major sermons: Mahasatipatthana Sutta, Magandiya Sutta and Mahanidana Sutta.

=== Vedic era ===
Vedic era's Painted Grey Ware (PGW), tentatively dated to 1500 BCE, were found at Topra Kalan during an exploration by the Haryana Archaeology Department in 2025. After conducting the in situ on-ground exploration, Ground Penetrating Radar survey by IIT Kanpur was conducted which showed several structures, such as "hollow structures, round structures, and walls," buried 5 meter deep around the village temple. Excavation is yet to be carried out.

=== Buddhist stupa ===
There use to be 4 Buddhist stupas as mentioned by Xuanzang, now extinct, at this village making it one of the largest Buddhist site in Haryana.

=== Topra Ashokan Pillar ===
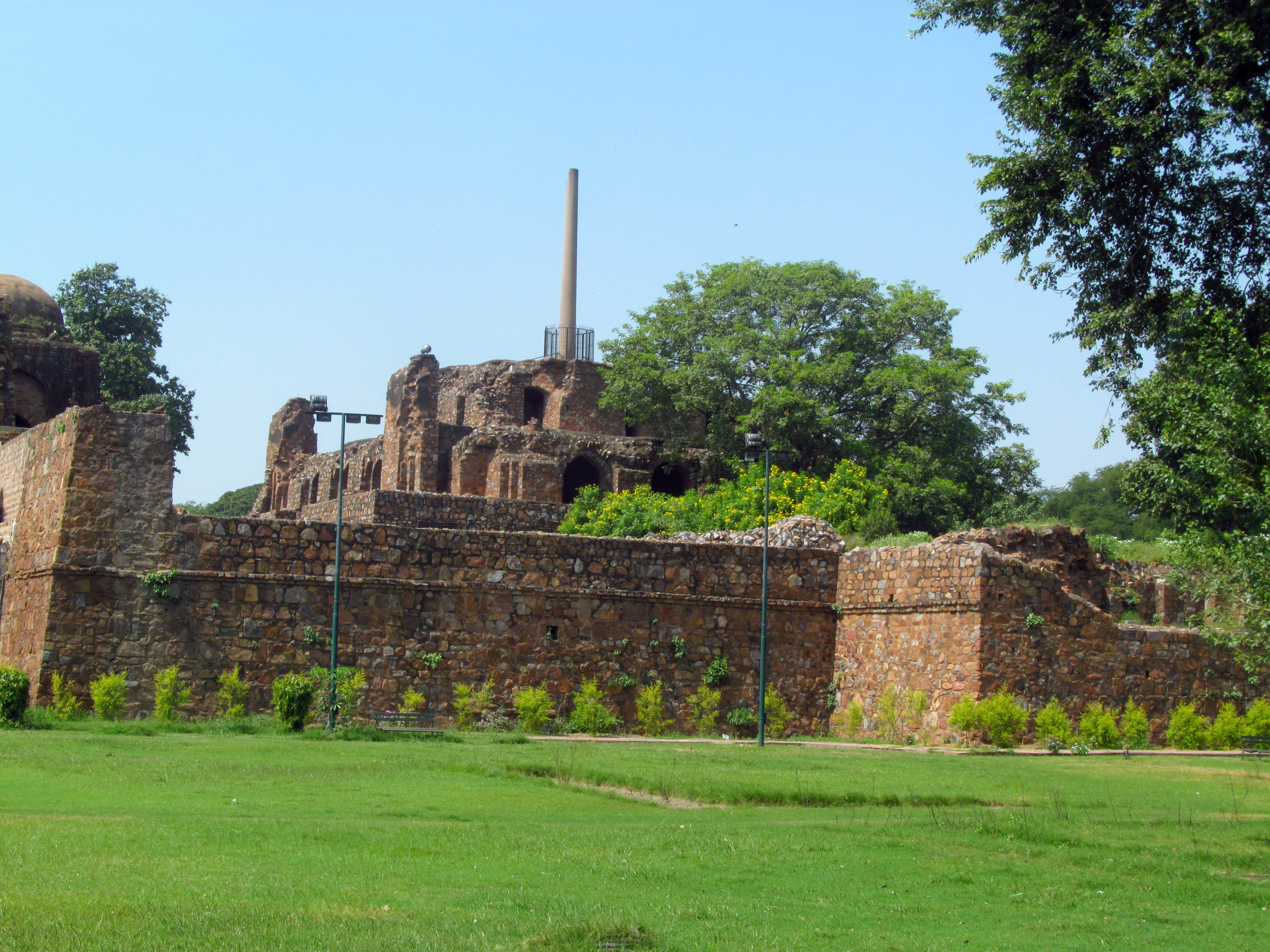
Delhi-Topra Ashokan pillar at Feroz Shah Kotla as it stands today.

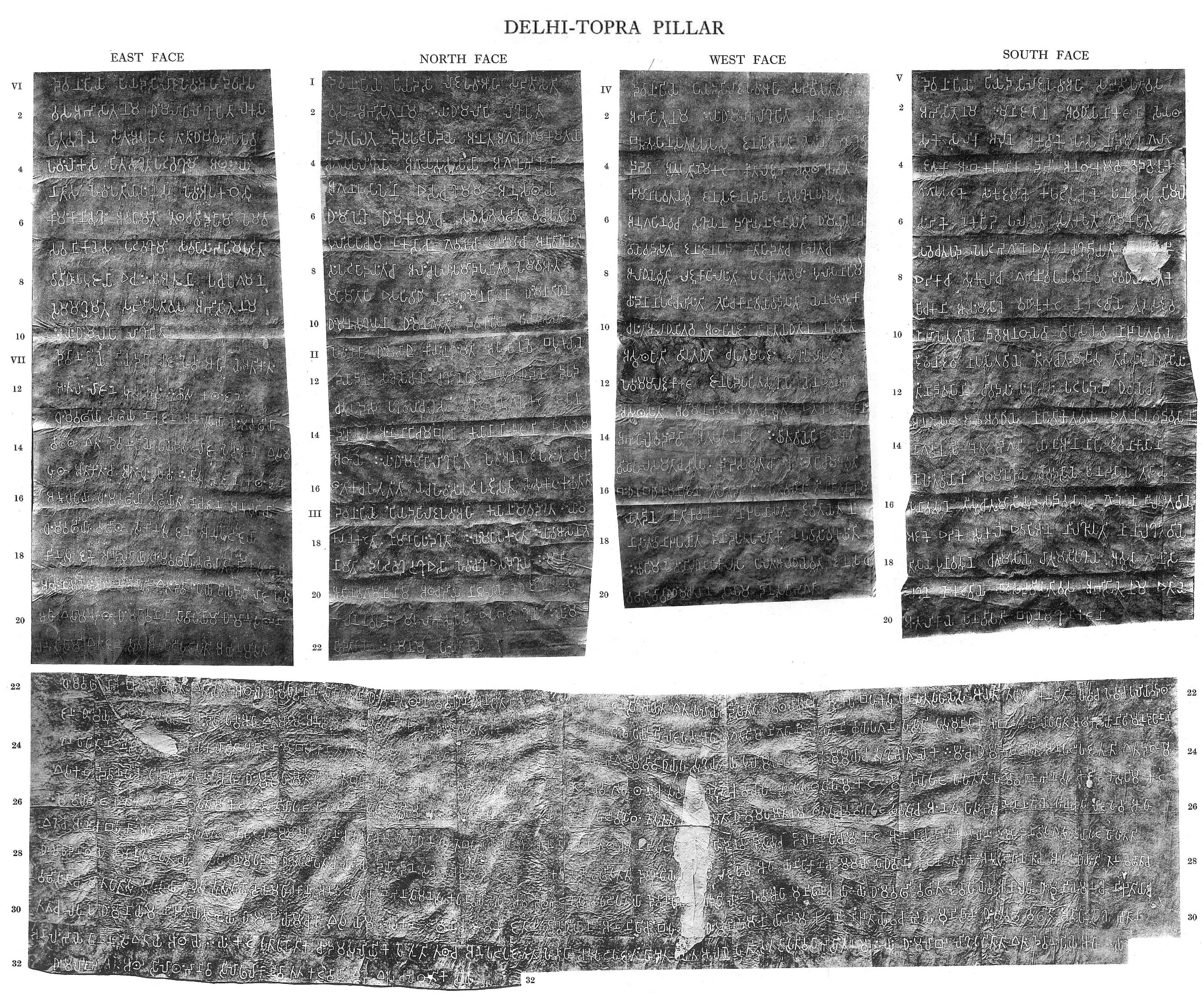
The inscriptions of Ashoka at Feroz Shah Kotla (I to VII edicts).

Situated in Pong valley of is the original home of Delhi-Topra pillar (originally located at 30.12889°N 77.15965°E), one of many pillars of Ashoka, that was moved from Topra to Feroz Shah Kotla in Delhi in 1356 CE by Firuz Shah Tughlaq (1309-1388 CE).

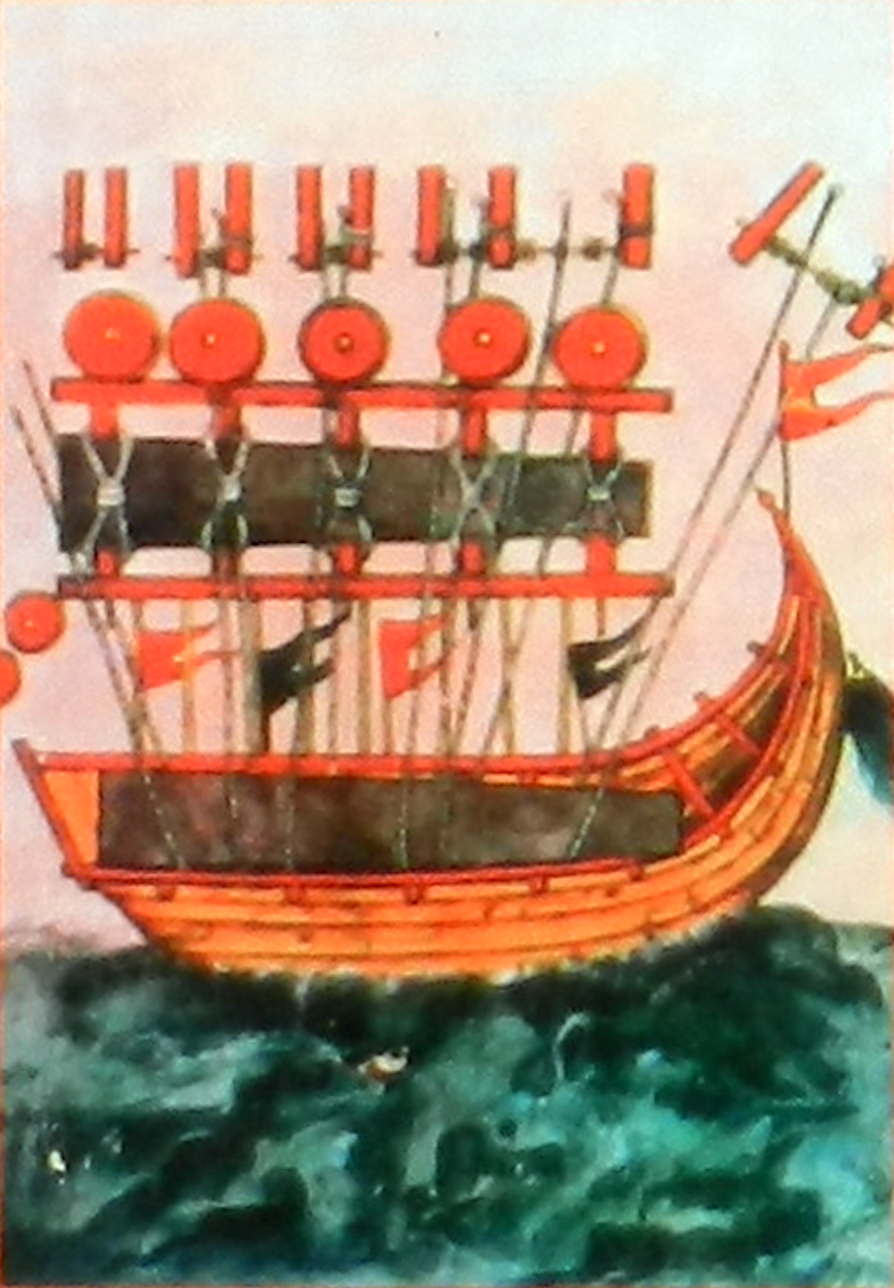
Transportation of the Topra pillar to Delhi. Sirat i-Firuz Shahi, 14th century illustration.

The original inscription on the Delhi-Topra Ashokan obelisk is primarily in Brahmi script, but the language was Prakrit, with some Pali and Sanskrit added later. The inscription was successfully translated in 1837 by James Prinsep. This and other ancient lats (pillars, obelisk) have earned Feroz Shah Tughlaq and Delhi Sultanate fame for its architectural patronage.

The Sultanate had wanted to break and reuse the Ashokan pillar for a minaret. Feroz Shah Tuhglaq, however decided to erect it near the mosque instead. At the time of re-installation of the obelisk in Delhi, in 1356, no one knew the meaning of the script engraved in the stone.

About five hundred years later, the script (Brahmi) was deciphered by James Prinsep in 1837 with help from scripts discovered on other pillars and tablets in South Asia.

It was restored by the Raja Hindu Rao after the Revolt of 1857.

==== Translation ====
The inscription on the 3rd century pillar describe King Devanampiya Piyadasi's policies and appeal to the people and future generations of the kingdom in matters of dharma (just, virtuous life), moral precepts and freedoms. Some extracts of the translation, per James Prinsep, are as follows:

Among high roads, I have caused fig trees to be planted that they may be for shade to animals and men...

— -Inscription on Ashoka Pillar

...And let these and others the most skillful in the sacred offices discreetly and respectfully use their most persuasive efforts, acting on the heart and eyes of the children, for the purposes of imparting enthusiasm and instruction in dharma (religion).

— -Inscription on Ashoka Pillar

And whatsoever benevolent acts have been done by me, the same shall be prescribed as duties to the people who follow after me, and in this manner shall their influence and increase be manifest - by service to father and mother, by service to spiritual pastors, by respectful demeanor to the aged and full of years, by kindness to learned, to the orphan and destitute and servants and minstrel tribe.

— -Inscription on Ashoka Pillar

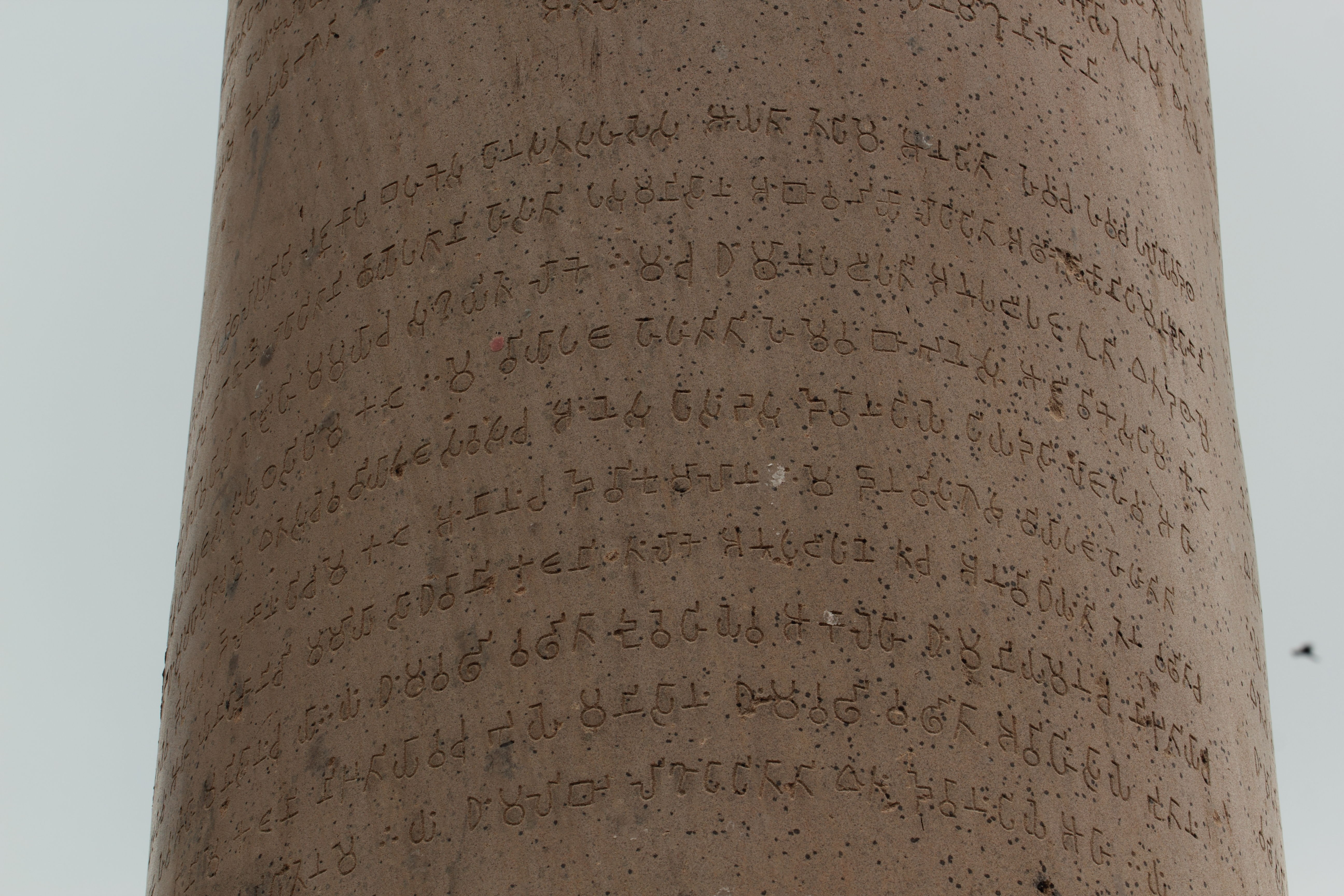
A close up of the inscription on the lat (obelisk).

And religion increaseth among men by two separate processes - by performance of religious offices, and by security against persecution. (...) And that religion may be free from the persecution of men, that it may increase through the absolute prohibition to put to death (any) living beings or sacrifice aught that draweth breath. For such an object is all this done, that it may endure to my sons and sons' sons - as long the sun and the moon shall last.

— -Inscription on Ashoka Pillar

Let stone pillars be prepared and let this edict of dharma (religion) be engraven thereon, that it may endure unto the remotest ages.

— -Inscription on Ashoka Pillar, Translated by James Prinsep in 1837

=== Topra Ashokan Edicts Archaeological Park and Museum ===
Ashokan Edicts Archaeological Park at Topra Kalan is 28 acre park which presently houses 30-ft tall replica of golden Dharmachakra in 2025. Earlier in 2011, Sidhartha Gauri and Dr. Satyadeep Neil Gauri, Founders of The Buddhist Forum initiated the Topra Asoka Edicts Park project along with INTACH, Gram Panchayat, Topra Kalan and other social organizations. Village panchayat has given away 28 acres land for the construction of park, museum and monastery. In 2015 April, Manohar Lal Khattar, the Chief Minister of Haryana, allocated INR 50 crore (INR 500 million) to build an Ashokan Edicts Archaeological Park at Topra Kalan village with seven Ashoka Pillars, eight Rock Edicts and other ancient structures of Mauryan Time will be constructed, which are yet to be constructed as of 2025.

The park lies to the north of Topra Kalan village on Gohini-Topra Kalan Road.

== See also ==
- Bodh Stupa
- Buddhist pilgrimage sites in Haryana
- Buddhist pilgrimage sites
- Buddhist pilgrimage sites in India
