= Feroz Shah Kotla =

Fort in Delhi, India

Coordinates: 28.635508°N 77.245047°E

Firoz Shah Kotla
- Part of Delhi
- Central Delhi district, India
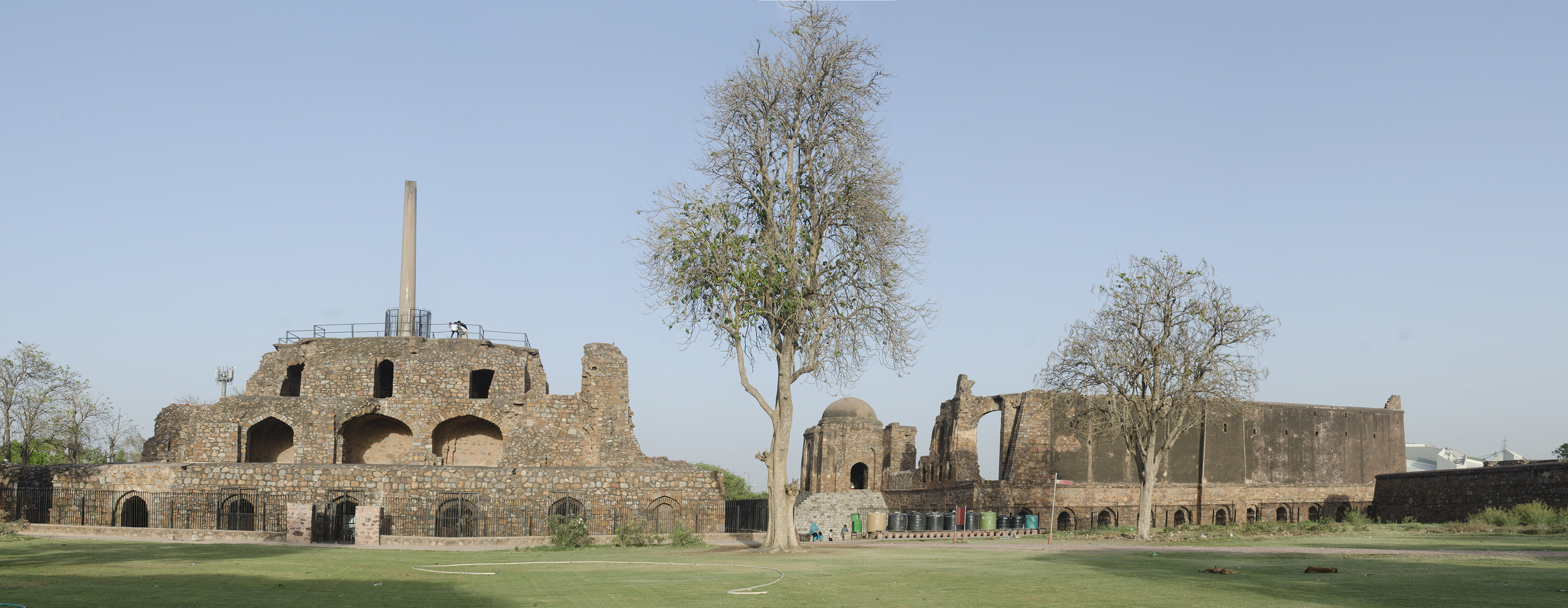
- Feroz Shah Kotla Panorama, with Ashokan Pillar (left) and Jami Masjid (right)

Site information
- Type: Fort
- Condition: Ruins

Site history
- Built: 1354; 672 years ago
- Built by: Delhi Sultanate
- Materials: Granite Stones and lime mortar

The Feroz Shah Kotla or Kotla ("fortress", "citadel") was a fortress built circa 1354 by Feroz Shah Tughlaq to house his version of Delhi called Firozabad.

A pristine polished sandstone Topra Ashokan pillar from the 3rd century BC rises from the palace's crumbling remains, one of many pillars of Ashoka left by the Mauryan emperor; it was moved from Topra Kalan in Pong Ghati of Yamunanagar district in Haryana to Delhi under orders of Firoz Shah Tughlaq of Delhi Sultanate, and re-erected in its present location in 1356. The original inscription on the obelisk is primarily in Brahmi script but language was Prakrit, with some Pali and Sanskrit added later. The inscription was successfully translated to English in 1837 by James Prinsep. This and other ancient lats (pillars, obelisk) have earned Firoz Shah Tughlaq and Delhi Sultanate fame for its architectural patronage.

Other than the Ashokan Pillar, the Fort complex also houses the Jami Masjid (Mosque), a Baoli and a large garden complex.

== History ==
Feroz Shah Tughlaq (r. 1351–1388), the Sultan of Delhi, established the fortified city of Firozabad in 1354, as the new capital of the Delhi Sultanate, and included in it the site of the present Feroz Shah Kotla. Kotla literally means fortress or citadel. The pillar, also called obelisk or Lat is an Ashoka Column, attributed to Mauryan ruler Ashoka. The 13.1 meters high column, made of polished sandstone and dating from the 3rd century BC, was brought from Ambala in the 14th century under orders of Feroz Shah. It was installed on a three-tiered arcaded pavilion near the congregational mosque, inside the Sultanate's fort. In centuries that followed, much of the structure and buildings near it were destroyed as subsequent rulers dismantled them and reused the spolia as building materials.

In the pre-independence era, due to lack of auditoriums in the capital, most classical music performances were staged here or at Qutub complex. Later Ebrahim Alkazi, then head of NSD, staged his landmark production of Dharamvir Bharati's Andha Yug here and its premiere in 1964 was attended by Prime Minister Jawaharlal Nehru.

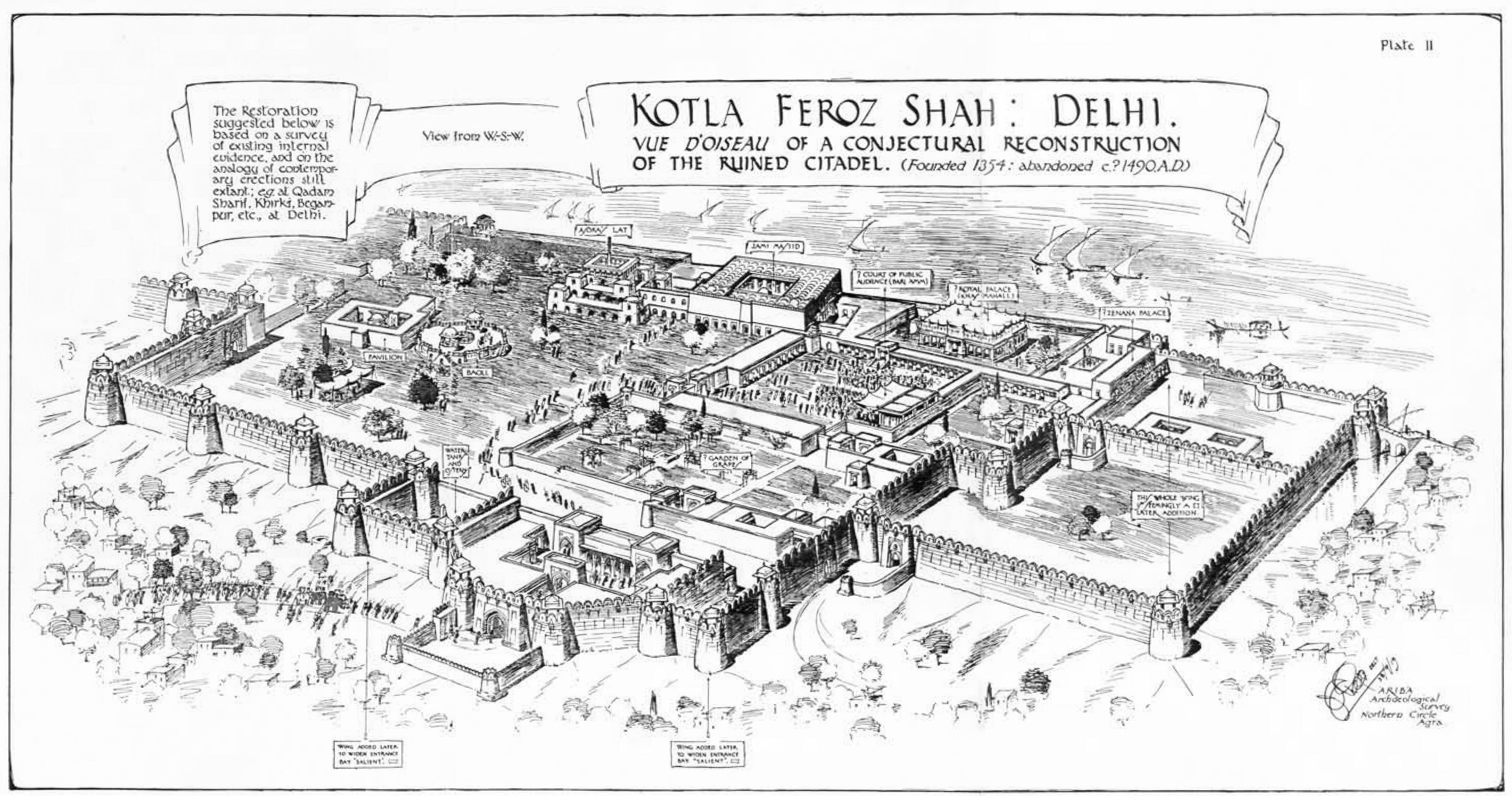
Tentative reconstruction of Firoz Shah Kotla.

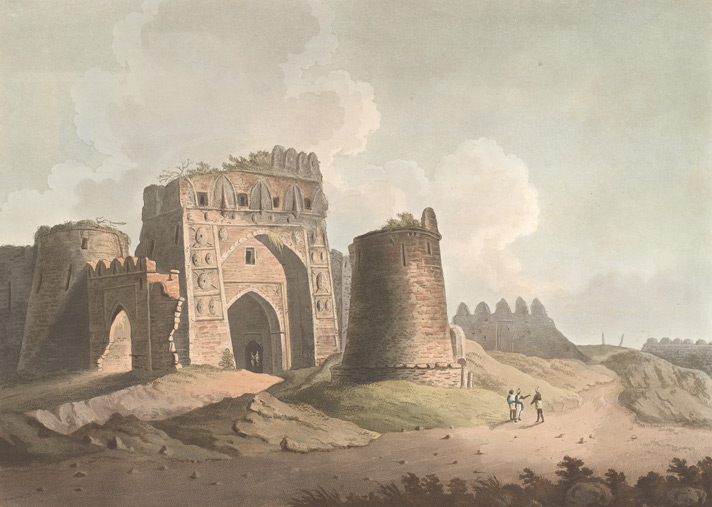
West gate of Firoz Shah Kotla, since destroyed.

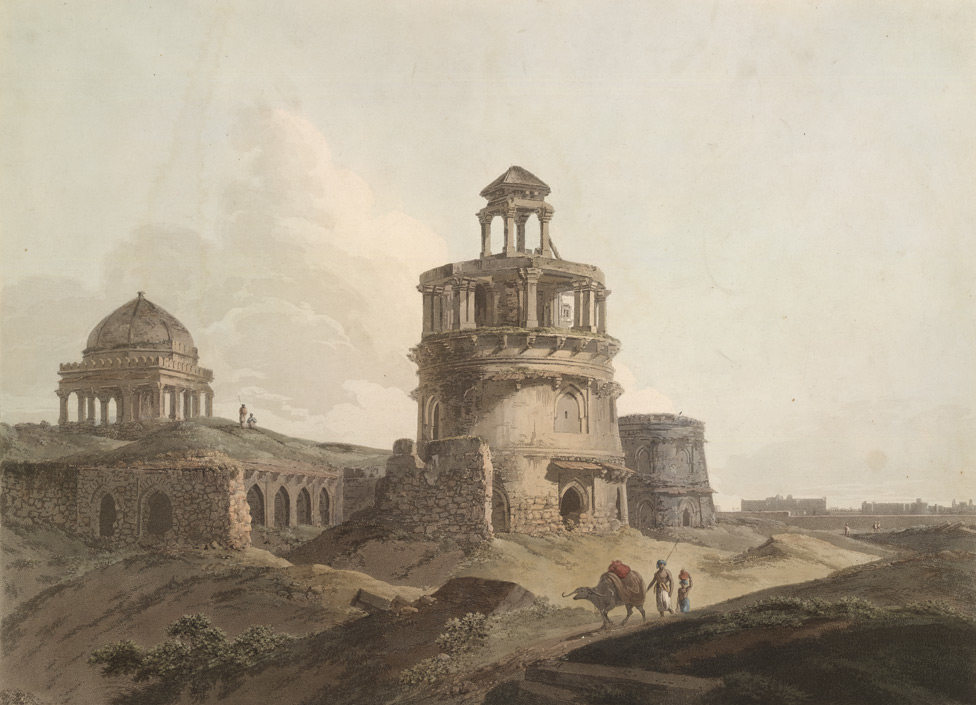
Remains of buildings at Firoz Shah Kotla, Delhi, 1795.

== Jami Masjid ==
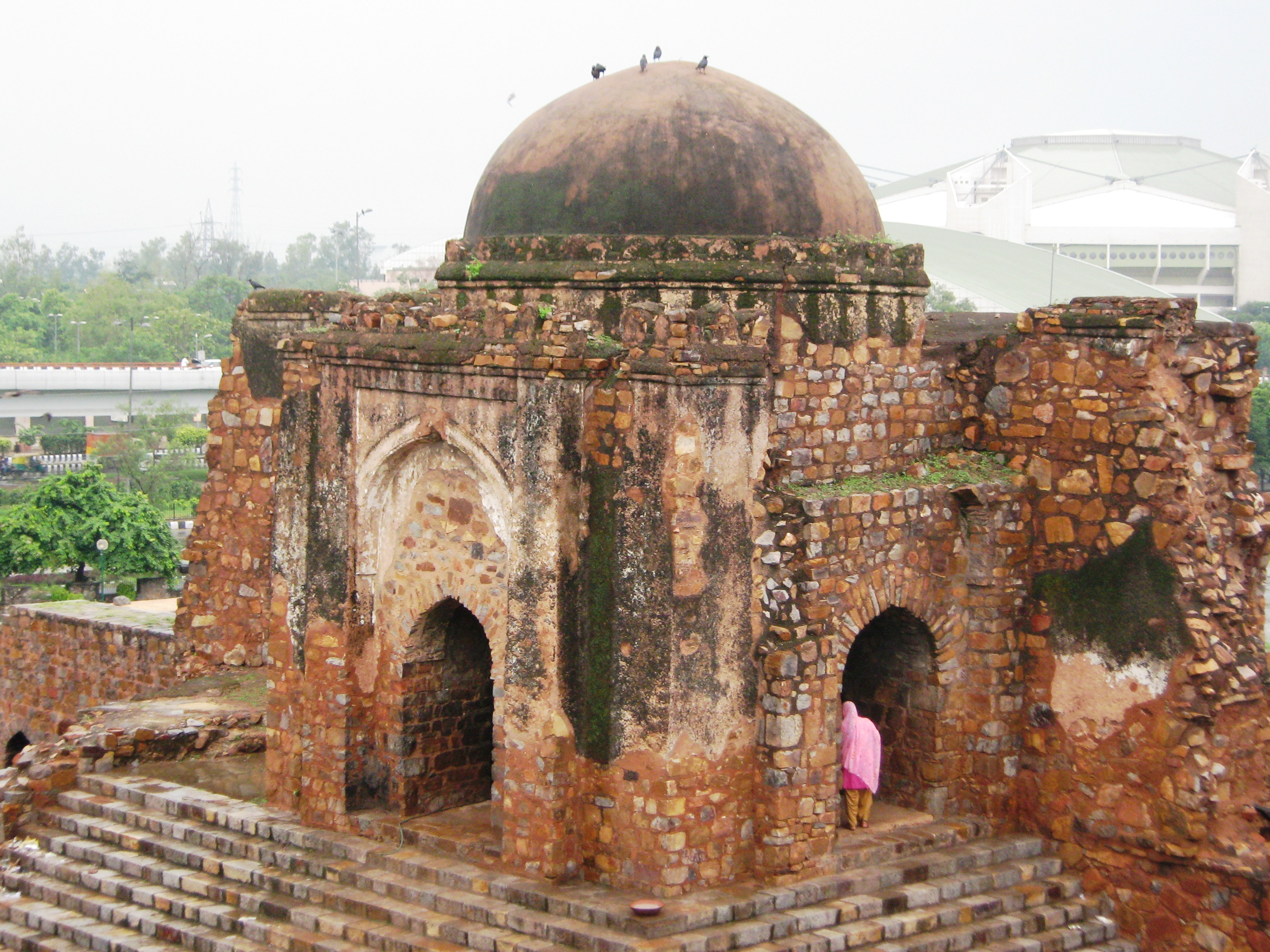
Jami Masjid

Jami Masjid is one of the most ancient and largest surviving mosque and monument, still in use. Architecturally it was built on a series of underground cells made of quartzite stone, covered with limestone. It is surrounded by a large courtyard with cloisters and a Prayer Hall. The Prayer Hall now in complete ruins was once used by the Royal Ladies. The masjid and its architecture is an example of Tughluq architecture.

The entrance of Jami Masjid lies on the northern side. It is connected by a causeway to the pyramidal structure of the Ashokan Pillar. This mosque was visited by Timur in 1398 to say his prayers. He was spellbound by its beauty and constructed a mosque in Samarkand in Mawarannahr imitating the design of this Masjid. This mosque is also known to be the place where Imad ul Mulk, a Mughal Prime Minister, got the Emperor Alamgir II murdered in 1759.

== Topra Ashokan pillar ==
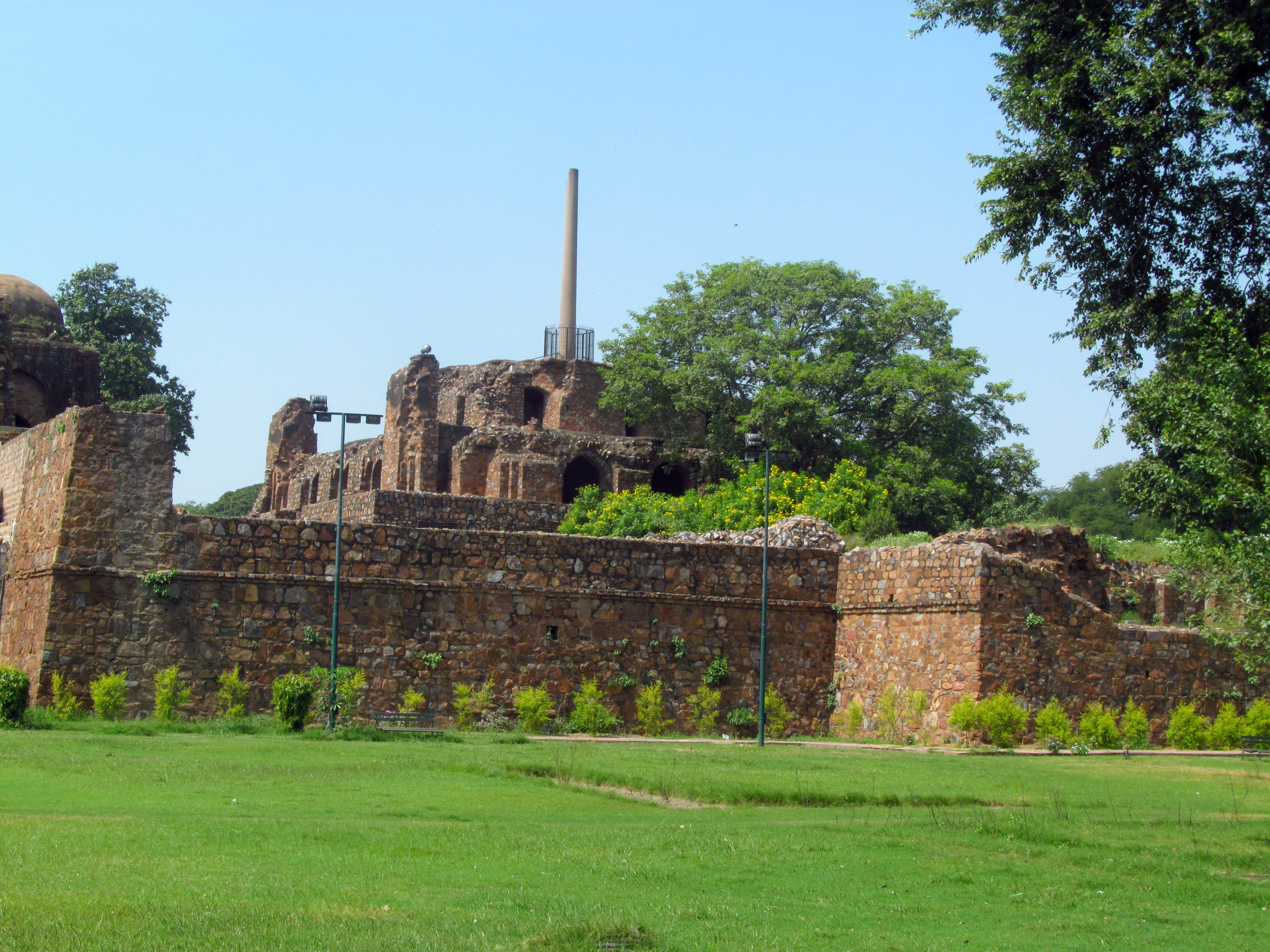
Delhi-Topra pillar at Firoz Shah Kotla as it stands today

The Ashokan Pillar which is now within Feroz Shah Kotla is towards the north of Jama Masjid [Mosque]. The Pillar was first erected by King Ashoka between 273 and 236 BC in Topra Kalan, Yamunanagar district, Haryana.

Of note, there is another Ashokan Pillar, that is seen installed near the Hindu Rao Hospital, also erected by Ashoka in Meerut. This pillar, however, was unfortunately broken into five pieces after it was damaged during an explosion. The pillar was neglected for a century up till 1838 when after the Revolt of 1857 Raja Hindu Rao took charge to transfer the Ashokan Pillar's broken pieces to Kolkata's Asiatic Society. Within a year, the structure was put together and re-established.

Both the Ashokan Pillars were carefully wrapped with cotton silk and were kept on a bed of reed made of raw silk. These were hence transported on a massive carriage attached with 42 wheels and drawn meticulously by 200 men from their original places to Delhi by Feroz Shah Tughlaq to avoid any damage during the journey. Upon reaching Delhi, they were then transported on huge boats to their final destination, one within Feroz Shah Kotla and the other on the ridge near Delhi University and Bara Hindu Rao Hospital.

== Script on stone ==
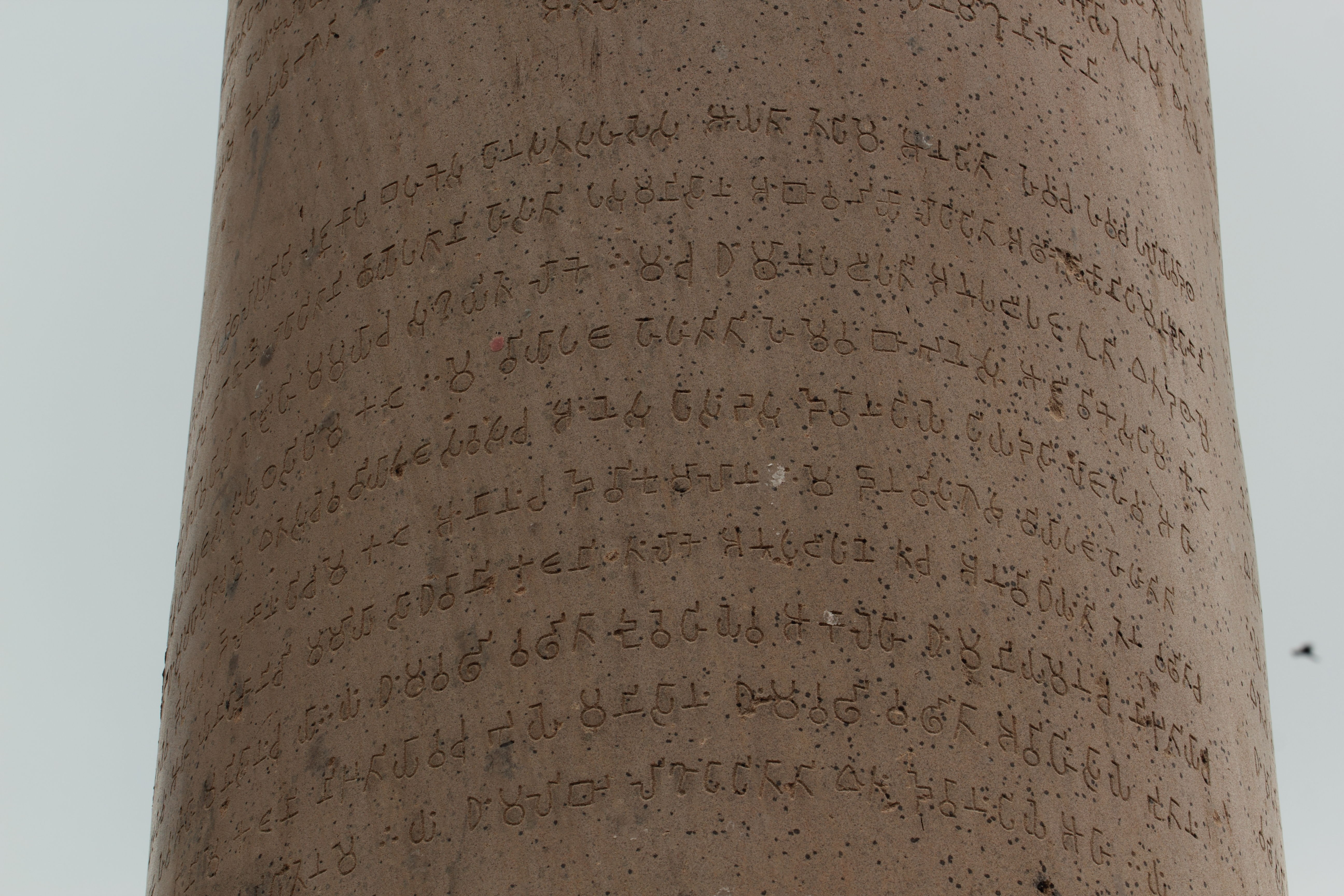
A close up of the inscription on the lat (obelisk)

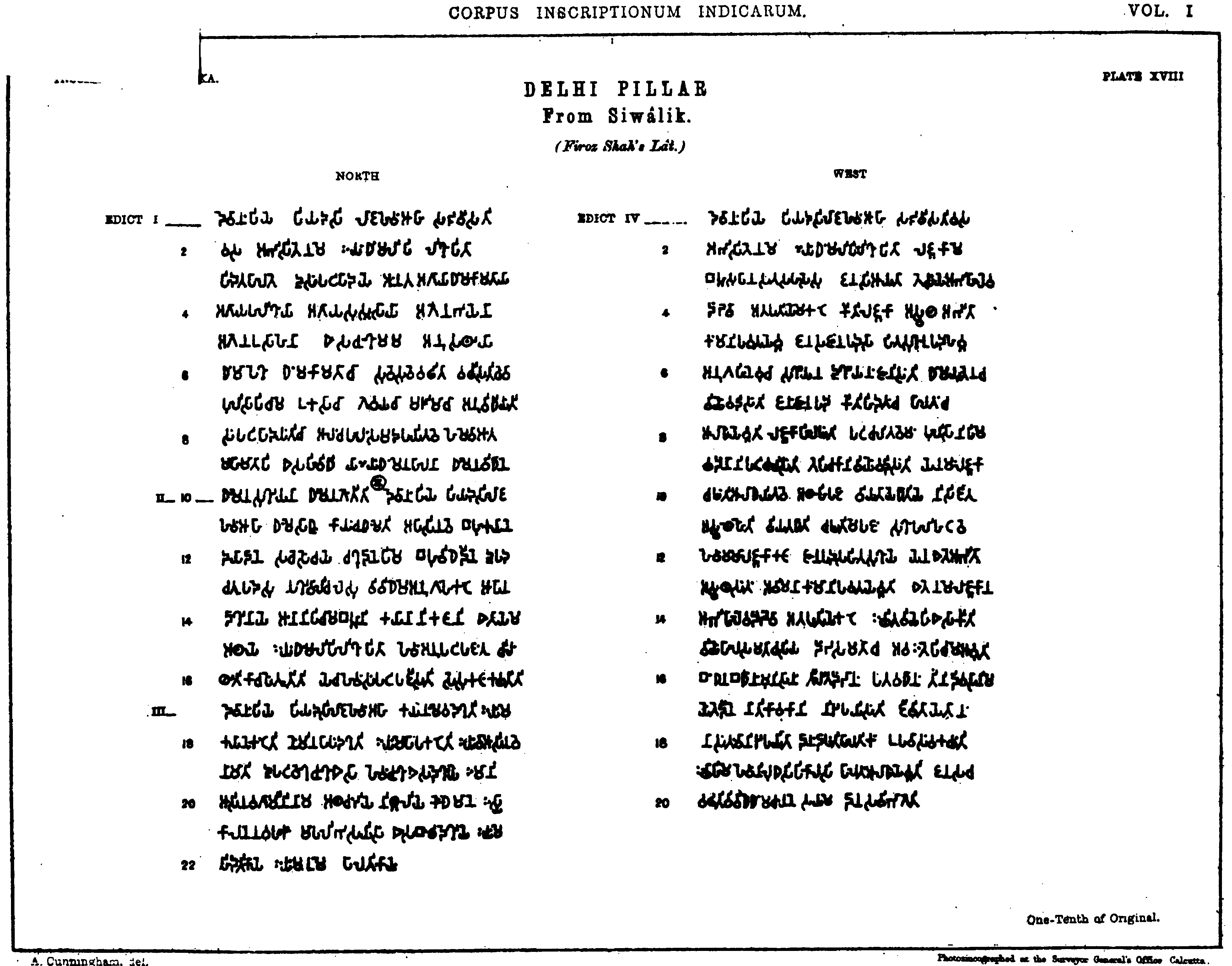
The inscription on Ashoka pillar at Firoz Shah Kotla

The Sultanate wanted to break and reuse the Ashokan pillar for a minaret. Firoz Shah Tuhglaq, however, decided to erect it near the mosque instead. At the time of re-installation of the obelisk in Delhi, in 1356, no one knew the meaning of the script engraved in the stone.

About five hundred years later, the script (Brahmi) was deciphered by James Prinsep in 1837 with help from scripts discovered on other pillars and tablets in South Asia.

=== Translation ===
The inscription on the 3rd-century pillar describes King Devanampiya Piyadasi's policies and appeal to the people and future generations of the kingdom in matters of dharma (just, virtuous life), moral precepts and freedoms. Some extracts of the translation, per James Prinsep, are as follows:

Along the highroads I have caused fig trees to be planted that they may be for shade to animals and men...

— Inscription on Ashoka Pillar

...And let these and others the most skillful in the sacred offices discreetly and respectfully use their most persuasive efforts, acting on the heart and eyes of the children, to impart enthusiasm and instruction in the dharma (religion).

— Inscription on Ashoka Pillar

And whatsoever benevolent acts have been done by me, the same shall be prescribed as duties to the people who follow after me, and in this manner shall their influence and increase be manifest – by service to father and mother, by service to spiritual pastors, by respectful demeanor to the aged and full of years, by kindness to learn, to the orphan and destitute and servants and minstrel tribe.

— Inscription on Ashoka Pillar

And religion increaseth among men by two separate processes – by the performance of religious offices, and by security against persecution. (...) And that religion may be free from the persecution of men, that it may increase through the absolute prohibition to put to death (any) living beings or sacrifice aught that draweth breath. For such an object is all this done, that it may endure to my sons and sons' sons – as long the sun and the moon shall last.

— Inscription on Ashoka Pillar

Let stone pillars be prepared and let this edict of dharma (religion) be engraved thereon, that it may endure unto the remotest ages.

— Inscription on Ashoka Pillar, Translated by James Prinsep in 1837

== Baoli (the well) ==
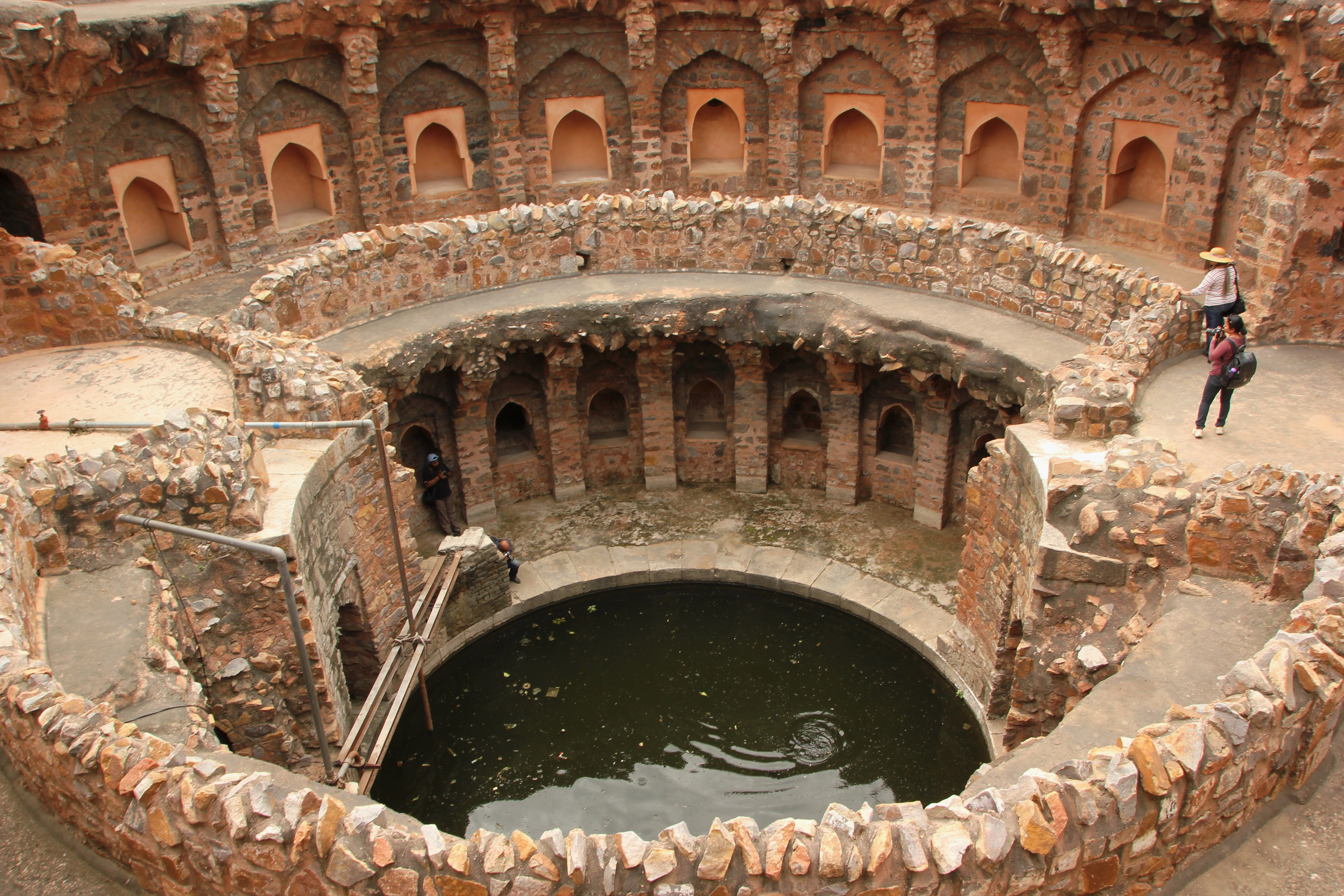
The Baoli

The circular Baoli, which means 'stepwell', lies towards the northwestern side of the Ashokan Pillar. It lies in the heart of a large garden constructed in the form of subterranean apartments and a large underground canal built on its eastern side through which the water runs into the well. This is the only circular Baoli in Delhi, and also one of the 4 Baolis, where the tank is not separated from the well. It once has a roof on it, which collapsed long ago, exposing the tank at the second level. Originally it had an entry from East and West, but now, only the west side is accessible. Due to security reasons, the Baoli is kept locked, but permission to visit can be obtained easily for research purposes from the Delhi circle office of Archaeological Survey of India.

== Prayers at the Fort ==
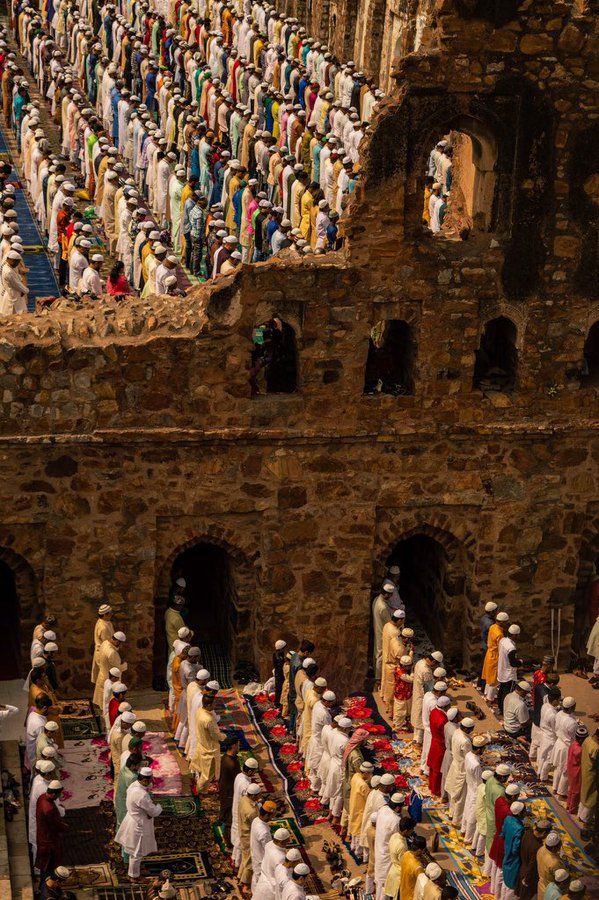
Firoz Shah Kotla, Delhi

Every Thursday there is a huge crowd at the fort. It is popularly believed that Jinn(s) descends at the Fort from the Heavens and accepts requests and wishes from people. A lot of wishes, penned down on paper, can be seen on the walls within the premises.

The association to Jinn(s) seems to be not too old. It is only since 1977, a few months after the end of the Emergency, that there are first records of people starting to come to Firoz Shah Kotla in large numbers.

== See also ==
- Purana Qila
  - Indraprastha
  - Edicts & additions by Ashoka the Great
  - Anangpur
  - Qila Rai Pithora
  - Siri Fort
  - Tughlaqabad Fort
  - Salimgarh Fort
  - Red fort
  - Rashtrapati Bhavan
- History of Delhi
  - Anangpur#Paleo
  - Stepwells of Delhi
