= Tughluq tombs =

The Tughlaq tombs in present-day India and Pakistan are mostly simple, monotonous and heavy structures built by the Tughlaq dynasty (1320–1413) in the Indo-Islamic architectural style. They look more like fortresses with walls surrounding them and have restrained decoration and embellishment compared to both earlier and later Indian Islamic tombs. Their architecture lacks the influence from Dravidian architecture and craftsmanship which was later found in Lodi and Mughal architecture. But Dravidian architectural influence on Tughlaq buildings was not totally absent. Features of Hindu influences on Tughlaq architecture include the flat lintel instead of pointed arch, pillars, windows with balconies and eaves and railings.

Tughlaqs built three main types of tombs: square, octagonal and pavilion. The last type was the simplest, consisting of a pavilion or a chhatri. The simple tombs are most likely to be those of nobles and family members of the sultans. It was constructed by Ghiyas-ud-din Tughlaq.

== Ghiyasuddin Tughlaq ==
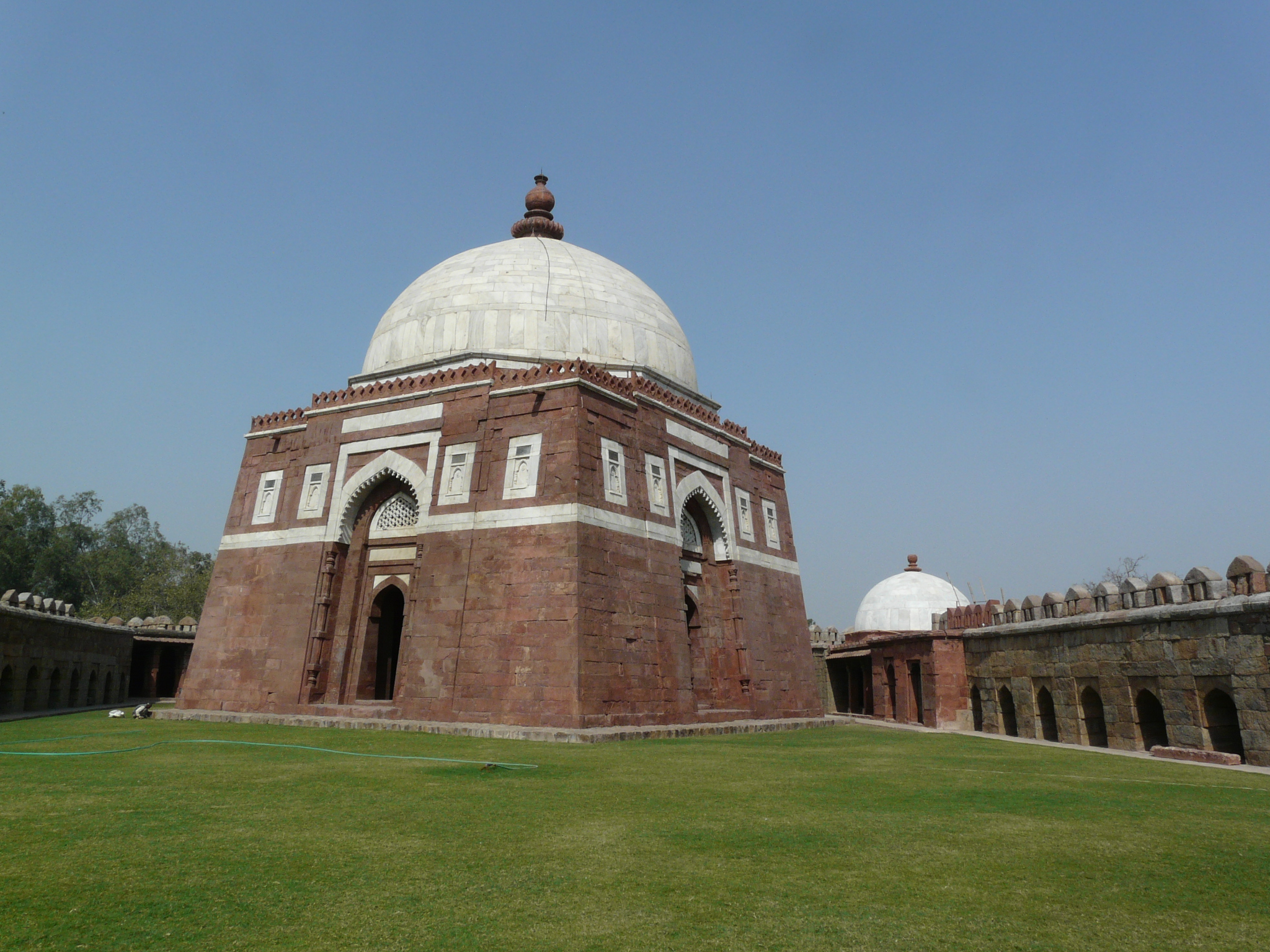
Ghiyath al-Din Tughlaq's Tomb in Delhi

Ghiyath al-Din Tughlaq, name also spelt Ghiyasuddin, was the founder of the Tughluq dynasty of the Delhi Sultanate. Within a year of his reign he decided to build the new fortified capital of Tughluqabad very close to the previous capital in Delhi, where he moved three years later. It is believed that Ghiyas built a tomb for himself in Multan when he was the governor there. However, on becoming sultan he decided to build another one for himself in Tughluqabad. After his death, his successor Muhammad bin Tughlaq, moved back to Delhi and left Tughluqabad to gradually crumble and decay, although the tomb of Ghiyas remains there in a very well preserved condition.

=== Tomb of Ghiyath al-Din Tughluq ===
The tomb was constructed in 1325 and is built of red sandstone and white marble, materials commonly used in Islamic structures at that time. It has a dome of white marble. It is considered to be one of the earliest masterpieces built of red sandstone and white marble. The square tomb is in the center of a pentagonal enclosure with high walls. There are entrances on the north, east and south sides. There are no Minarets surrounding the tomb. The architectural style of the tomb is inspired by the Khalji portal- Alai Darwaza- in the Qutb Minar complex. This is hardly surprising as Ghiyas was originally a Khalji slave who later became one of the governors.

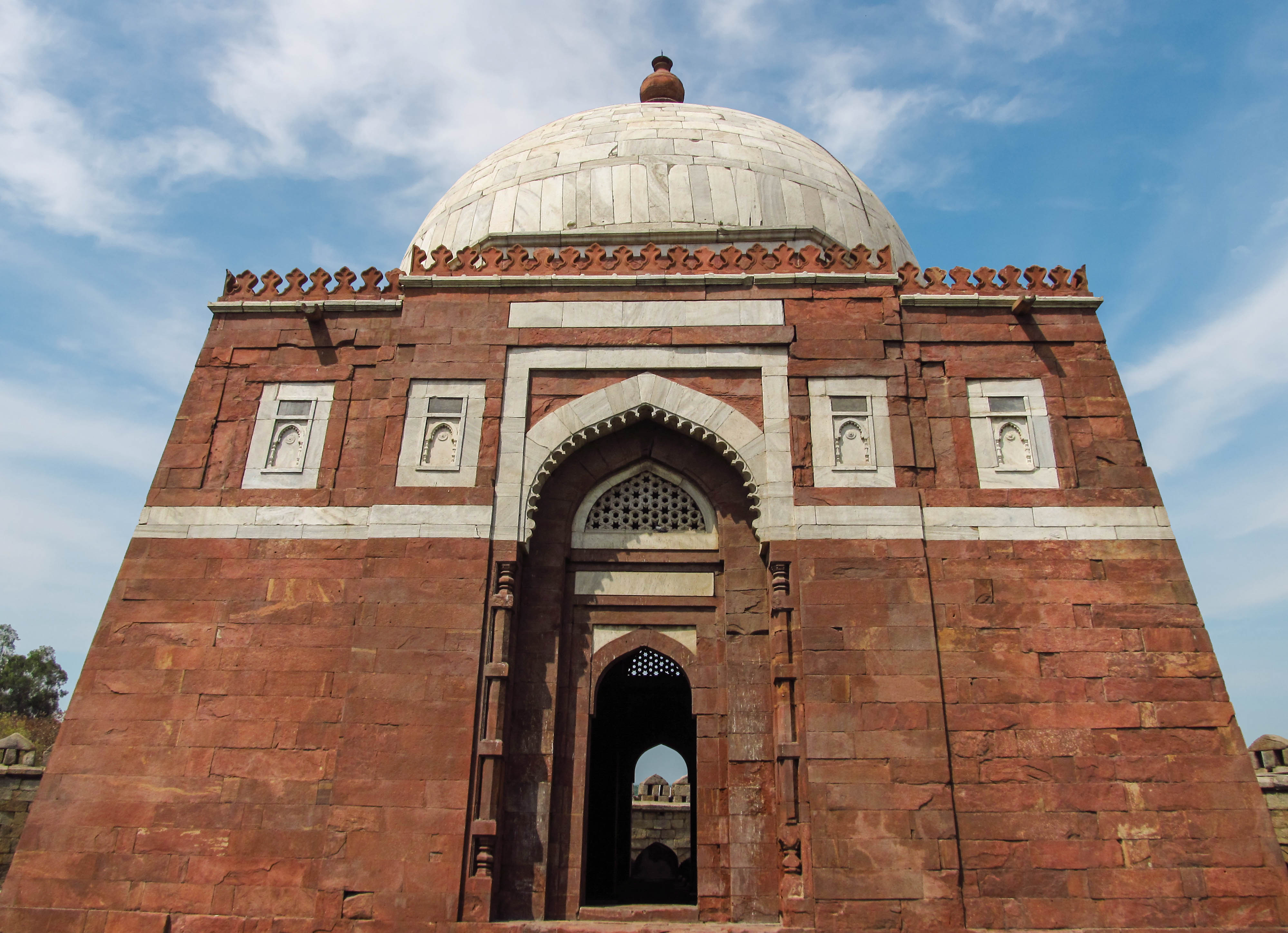
Tomb of Ghiyas ud-Din Khan

A notable feature of the tomb are the sloping walls, at a 75 degree angle with the ground instead of vertical walls. This architectural style is similar to the sloping walls of the Hindola Mahal (Swing palace) in Mandu, Madhya Pradesh. It is so called because of the distinctive sloping walls which give an impression that the palace is swaying from side to side. Perhaps the wall design was intended to buttress the heavy stone arches that support the ceiling. The inside walls are vertical and plain.

==== Hindu influences ====
The Ghiyas tomb exhibits peculiar Hindu influences in the form of a kalassa (pinnacle) on top of the white marble dome and a redundant stone lintel installed just below the arch. The kalassa adorns tops of most shikharas of ancient and modern Hindu temples in India. The pinnacle was planted at the apex of the Tughluq dome. The stone lintel was installed either to ensure stability, to fit a rectangular timber door in the arched opening, or purely for aesthetic reasons, to continue the white marble band along the facade. Whatever the reason for it, this 'architectural compromise' became an elegant and effective device in the building style of the Tughluqs as well as their successors.

==== Graves ====
The Ghiyas tomb has three graves. The central grave is known to be that of Ghiyas-ud-Din Tughluq, other two belong to his son, Muhammad bin Tughluq and his wife, Makhdum-i-Jahan. The grave of Makhdum-i-Jahan must have been added later. There are no epigraphs of any sort.

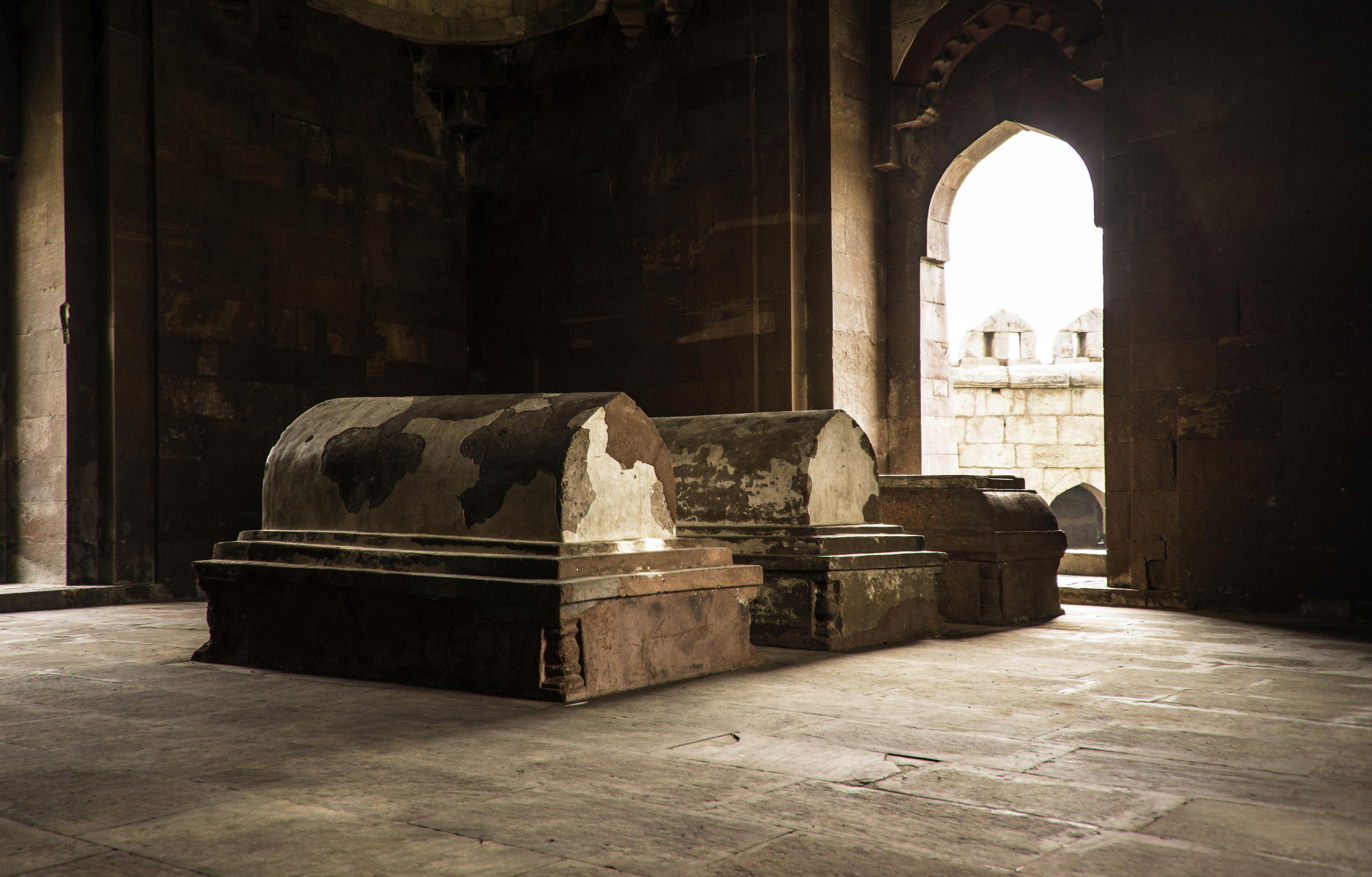
Graves inside the tomb

=== Tomb of Shah Rukn-e-Alam ===
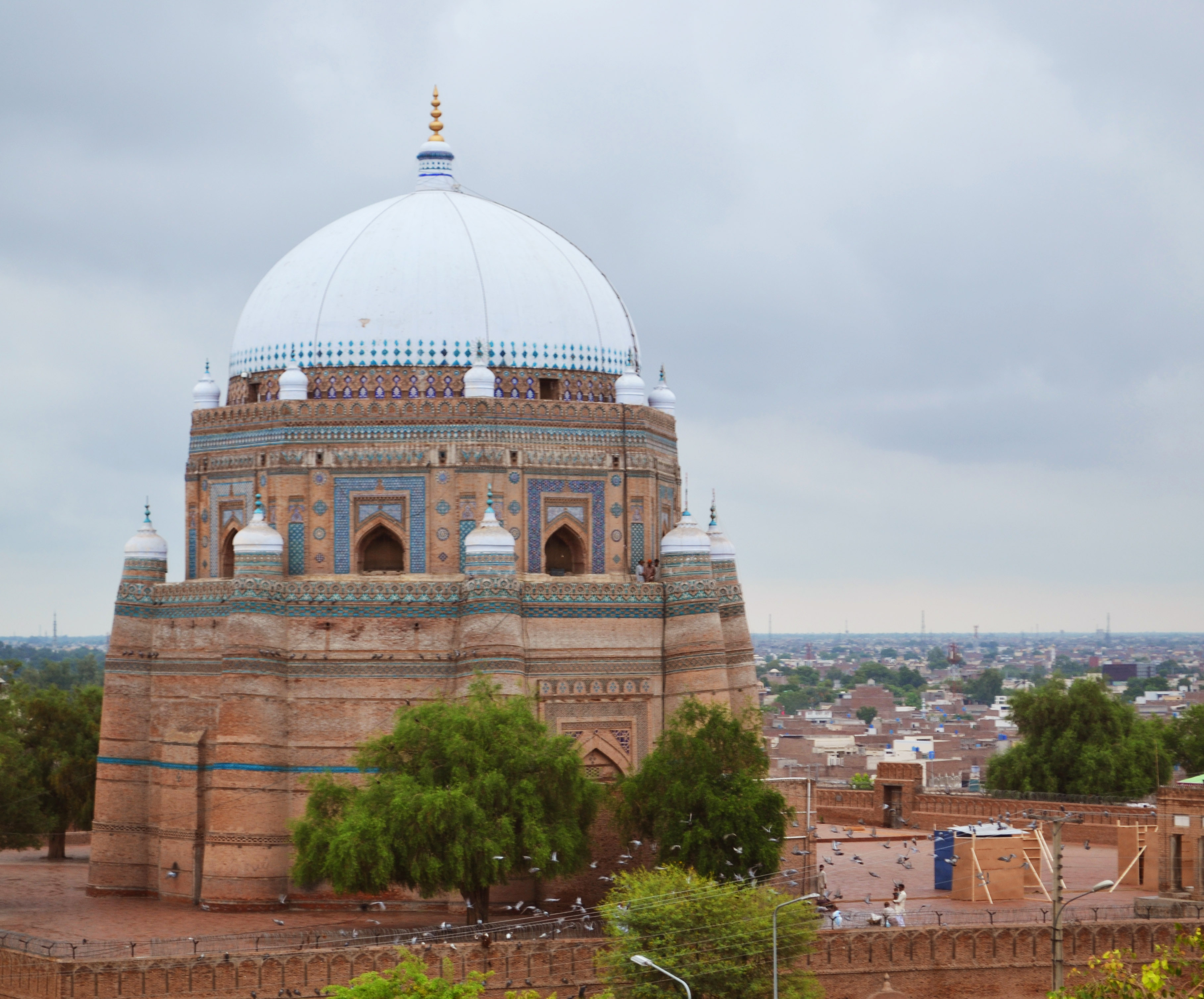
Tomb of Shah Rukn-e-Alam, Multan, Pakistan

The present day tomb of Shah Rukn-e-Alam is said to have been built by Ghiyas-ud-din Tughluq for himself during the days of his governorship under Ala-ud-din Khalji. It was later given by his son Muhammad, to the followers of Shah Rukn-e-Alam, a renowned Sufi saint of Multan, Pakistan. The mausoleum, built entirely of red brick, has the thick, sloping walls that characterise Tughluq architecture. The lower walls form a high octagon whose corners are marked by round and tapering buttresses. The second layer has smaller octagonal structure with a narrow, uncovered walkway on the second level. Surmounting this structure is a massive, hemispherical dome, that can be seen from miles away. In the 1970s the mausoleum was renovated.

== Firoz Shah Tughluq ==
Firuz Shah Tughluq has contributed to architecture in a similar manner as Shah Jahan did years later. However, Firoz's buildings were of simpler designs than those built earlier by the Khaljis. The coffers of the Treasury were almost empty when Firoz Shah took over. This meant he had to use simple design and cheap materials such as rubble and whitewashed plaster instead of the stone and marble combination. A few tombs built by Firoz shah are rarely ever mentioned as his name is more associated with townlike

Yet the remains of the three tombs built by him in Delhi are still visible. These are: Fateh Khan's tomb, Firoz Shah's tomb, and the tomb of Khan-i-Jahan Tilangani.

=== Tomb of Khan-i-Jahan Tilangani ===
Khan-i-Jahan Tilangani was the Prime minister of Firoz Shah. His tomb is the first octagonal tomb to be built in Delhi. Thus, it is of much historical and architectural significance, even though it is not a royal tomb. It is similar(but not identical) to the Dome of the Rock in Jerusalem and Qubbat-i-Sulaibiya in Samarra. But the Tilangani tomb is built of different materials, grey granite and red sandstone, white marble and plaster instead of the enamelled tiles of the tomb in Samarra. It also suffers from design defects such as very low central and subsidiary domes, very low verandah arches and a lack of symmetry. These defects were gradually removed and this tomb became an inspiration for the later Sayyid and Lodi tombs.

=== Firoz Shah's Tomb ===
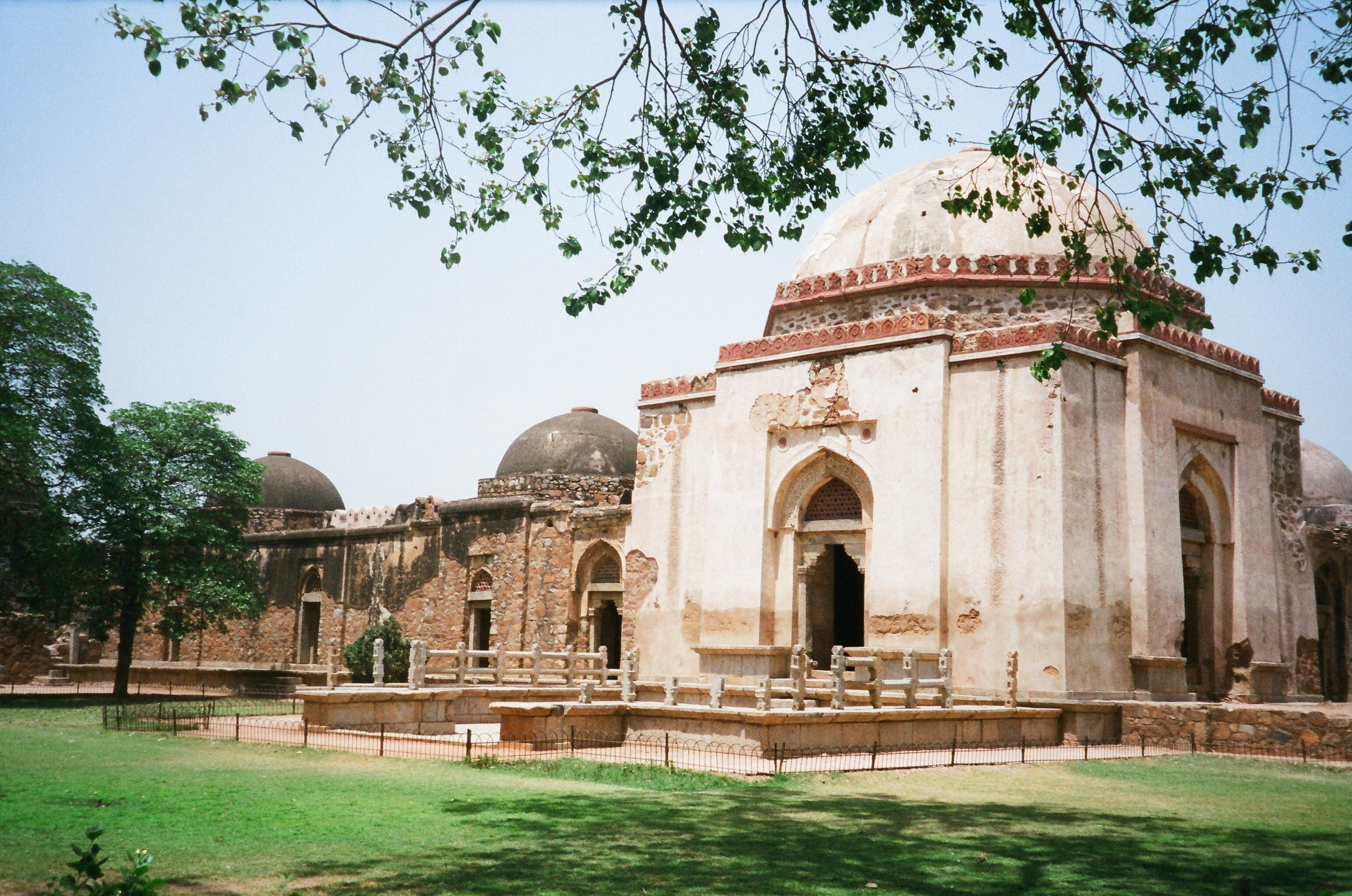
Sultan Feroze Shah Tughlaq's tomb with adjoining Madrassa, in Hauz Khas Complex, Delhi

==== Location ====
Firoz Shah's tomb is located in Hauz Khas (New Delhi), close to the tank built by Alauddin Khalji. Attached to the tomb is a madrasa built by Firoz Shah in 1352-53. The entrance to the tomb is through a courtyard. The archway of the entrance gate has a date engraved on it- 1507-08, the reign of Sikandar Lodi, which suggests that he may have had the tomb repaired.

==== Architecture ====
The tomb is square in plan, heavy and massive in appearance with plain cemented walls unlike the marble on the facade of the Ghiyas tomb, and a slightly pointed dome supported by an octagonal drum. The lower curves of the dome arches are decorated with intersecting coloured bands. The arched pendentives contain Koranic inscriptions and the walls are decorated with floral designs.

Firoz Shah's tomb differs from that of Ghiyas in the use of construction materials. Unlike the latter, it is not built of stone; instead a thick layer of durable stucco is used which was probably painted. It has a paved verandah, enclosed by Buddhist stone railings of the type found in Sanchi. It is not clear why these stone railings were used. One view is that Firoz Shah used these pre-Muslim Indian forms as a means of associating himself with earlier greatness.

==== Graves ====
There are no inscriptions on the four graves inside the tomb. It is believed that the central grave is that of Firoz Shah, and the two similar ones are probably those of his son, Nasir ud din Mahmud, and grandson, Ala-ud-din Sikandar Shah.
