= Kailas Pal =

Raja of the Nurpur Kingdom

Raja Kailas Pal Pathania (1353-1397 CE) was a Raja of the Nurpur kingdom, who succeeded Raja Jas Pal as the chief of the Pathania Clan of Rajputs. He is accorded credit for wounding and defeating Tatar Khan, a governor of Khorasan, who had invaded the Punjab. Kailas Pal received a reward of a Mansab of 5,000 Cavalry and Infantry from the Tughlaq dynasty. Such a reward displayed that he was regarded as a powerful Chief and an important ally by the Tughlaqs. Most probably it refers to some local conflict between the Pathania King and Tatar Khan, the viceroy of the Punjab, under Muhammad bin Tughluq (1325–51). It took place previous to 1342 which was the year Tatar Khan was killed in a battle with the Gakhars. Kailas Pal is also stated to have consutructed an irrigation channel from the Ravi River to Pathankot which is still in existence today. A couplet commemorating the battle between Kailas Pal and Tatar Khan has come down to our own time:

Jo mukh dekhan arsi sise dil-kananda ।

Mathe Phat Tatar Khan Kailase anda । ।

When he looks at his face in the heart-rending mirror, Tatar Khan sees on his forehead the scar (of the wound)

inflicted by Kailas Pal in battle.
