= List of cities in the Punjab region by population =

The following is a list of the largest cities in the Punjab region by population located in modern divisions which were part of the British Punjab Province as at 1947 when the modern countries of India and Pakistan were created. Accordingly, the Punjab is a geographical region in South Asia now divided politically by Pakistan and India and is also administratively divided into provinces, states, and territories within both countries. The former province is today part of Punjab, Haryana, Himachal Pradesh states and Chandigarh union territory in India, and Punjab province and Islamabad Capital Territory in Pakistan. This list deals with the areas within city administrative boundaries (city propers), urban areas, and metropolitan areas.

== List of the Cities ==
| Rank | City | Administrative subdivision | Sovereign state | Image | City proper population | Urban area population | Metropolitan area population |
|---|---|---|---|---|---|---|---|
| 1 | Lahore | Province of Punjab | Pakistan | | 11,126,285 (2017) | 11,545,000 (2016) | |
| 2 | Faisalabad | Province of Punjab | Pakistan | | 3,203,846 (2017) | 3,675,000 (2016) | |
| 3 | Gurgaon | State of Haryana | India | | 2,982,928 (2021) | | |
| 4 | Rawalpindi | Province of Punjab | Pakistan | | 2,098,231 (2017) | | |
| 5 | Gujranwala | Province of Punjab | Pakistan | | 2,027,001 (2017) | 2,705,000(2016) | |
| 6 | Ludhiana | State of Punjab | India | | 1,885,456 (2021 estimate) | 1,740,000 (2016) | |
| 7 | Multan | Province of Punjab | Pakistan | | 1,871,843 (2017) | 3,100,000(2016) | |
| 8 | Faridabad | State of Haryana | India | | 1,404,653 (2011) | | |
| 9 | Amritsar | State of Punjab | India | | 1,400,311 (2021 estimate) | 1,285,000 (2016) | |
| 10 | Chandigarh | Union territory of Chandigarh | India | | 1,055,880 (2011) | 1,150,000 (2016) | |
| 11 | Jalandhar | State of Punjab | India | | 862,196 (2011) | 970,000 (2016) | |
| 12 | Bahawalpur | Province of Punjab | Pakistan | | 762,111 (2017) | 930,000 (2016) | |
| 13 | Sargodha | Province of Punjab | Pakistan | | 659,862 (2017) | 1,550,000 (2016) | |
| 14 | Sialkot | Province of Punjab | Pakistan | | 655,852 (2017) | 580,000 (2016) | |
| 15 | Sheikhupura | Province of Punjab | Pakistan | | 473,129 (2017) | 540,000 (2016) | |
| 16 | Patiala | State of Punjab | India | | 446,246 (2011) | 803,242 (2016) | |
| 17 | Rahim Yar Khan | Province of Punjab | Pakistan | —N/a | 420,419 (2017) | | |
| 18 | Jhang | Province of Punjab | Pakistan | | 414,131 (2017) | | |
| 19 | Dera Ghāzi Khān | Province of Punjab | Pakistan | —N/a | 399,064 (2017) | | |
| 20 | Gujrat | Province of Punjab | Pakistan | | 390,533 (2017) | | |
| 21 | Sahiwal | Province of Punjab | Pakistan | —N/a | 389,605 (2017) | | |
| 22 | Wah Cantonment | Province of Punjab | Pakistan | —N/a | 380,103 (2017) | | |
| 23 | Rohtak | State of Haryana | India | | 374,292 (2011) | | |
| 24 | Kasur | Province of Punjab | Pakistan | | 358,409 (2017) | | |
| 25 | Okara | Province of Punjab | Pakistan | | 357,935 (2017) | | |
| 26 | Hisar | State of Haryana | India | | 301,249 (2011) | | |
| 27 | Ambala | State of Haryana | India | | 300,484 (2011) | | |
| 28 | Panipat | State of Haryana | India | | 294,150 (2011) | | |
| 29 | Karnal | State of Haryana | India | —N/a | 286,964 (2011) | | |
| 30 | Bathinda | State of Punjab | India | | 285,813 (2011) | | |
| 31 | Chiniot | Province of Punjab | Pakistan | —N/a | 278,747 (2017) | | |
| 32 | Sonipat | State of Haryana | India | | 277,053 (2011) | | |
| 33 | Kāmoke | Province of Punjab | Pakistan | —N/a | 249,767 (2017) | | |
| 34 | Hafizabad | Province of Punjab | Pakistan | —N/a | 245,784 (2017) | | |
| 35 | Sadiqabad | Province of Punjab | Pakistan | —N/a | 239,677 (2017) | | |
| 36 | Burewala | Province of Punjab | Pakistan | —N/a | 231,797 (2017) | | |
| 37 | Khanewal | Province of Punjab | Pakistan | | 227,059 (2017) | | |
| 38 | Yamunanagar | State of Haryana | India | —N/a | 216,628 (2011) | | |
| 39 | Panchkula | State of Haryana | India | | 211,355 (2011) | | |
| 40 | Muzaffargarh | Province of Punjab | Pakistan | | 209,604 (2017) | | |
| 41 | Mandi Bahauddin | Province of Punjab | Pakistan | —N/a | 198,609 (2017) | | |
| 42 | Bhiwani | State of Haryana | India | —N/a | 197,662 (2011) | | |
| 43 | Jhelum | Province of Punjab | Pakistan | | 190,425 (2017) | | |
| 44 | Khanpur | Province of Punjab | Pakistan | —N/a | 184,793 (2017) | | |
| 45 | Sirsa | State of Haryana | India | —N/a | 183,282 (2011) | | |
| 46 | Pakpattan | Province of Punjab | Pakistan | | 176,693 (2017) | | |
| 47 | Daska | Province of Punjab | Pakistan | —N/a | 175,170 (2017) | | |
| 48 | Gojra | Province of Punjab | Pakistan | —N/a | 174,860 (2017) | | |
| 49 | Bahadurgarh | State of Haryana | India | | 170,426 (2011) | | |
| 50 | Shimla | State of Himachal Pradesh | India | | 169,758 (2011) | | |
| 51 | Hoshiarpur | State of Punjab | India | | 168,443 (2011) | | |
| 52 | Muridke | Province of Punjab | Pakistan | —N/a | 166,652 (2017) | | |
| 53 | Jind | State of Haryana | India | —N/a | 166,225 (2011) | | |
| 54 | Batala | State of Punjab | India | | 156,400 (2011) | | |
| 55 | Thanesar | State of Haryana | India | | 154,962 (2011) | | |
| 56 | Moga | State of Punjab | India | | 150,432 (2011) | | |
| 57 | Pathankot | State of Punjab | India | | 148,357 (2011) | | |
| 58 | Mohali | State of Punjab | India | | 146,104 (2011) | | |
| 59 | Abohar | State of Punjab | India | —N/a | 145,238 (2011) | | |
| 60 | Kaithal | State of Haryana | India | | 144,633 (2011) | | |
| 61 | Rewari | State of Haryana | India | | 140,864 (2011) | | |
| 62 | Malerkotla | State of Punjab | India | | 135,330 (2011) | | |
| 63 | Khanna | State of Punjab | India | | 128,130 (2011) | | |
| 64 | Palwal | State of Haryana | India | —N/a | 127,931 (2011) | | |
| 65 | Jagadhari | State of Haryana | India | —N/a | 124,915 (2011) | | |
| 66 | Muktsar | State of Punjab | India | | 117,085 (2011) | | |
| 67 | Barnala | State of Punjab | India | —N/a | 116,454 (2011) | | |
| 68 | Firozpur | State of Punjab | India | | 110,091 (2011) | | |
| 69 | Kapurthala | State of Punjab | India | | 101,654 (2011) | | |

== See also ==
- List of most populous cities in Pakistan
- List of cities in Punjab and Chandigarh by population
- List of cities in Punjab, Pakistan by population
- List of North Indian cities by population
- List of cities in India by population
