= List of North Indian cities by population =

North India, according to combined definition by the Ministry of Home Affairs, Geological Survey of India and Ministry of Culture refers to the northern region of India comprising the states of Uttar Pradesh, Uttarakhand, Punjab, Haryana, Himachal Pradesh, Rajasthan and the Union Territories of Delhi, Jammu & Kashmir, Ladakh and Chandigarh.

== List ==
The following is the list cities in North India, sorted by their population. The population statistics indicated in this article are for the year 2011, in accordance with the 15th Indian Census.

Location of 1 million-plus cities in North India. Red dots represent capital cities of their respective states
- The cities which are listed in **bold** are the capital of the respective state / union territory / country.

Rank	City	State/UT	Population
1	**Delhi**	Delhi	11,007,835
2	**Jaipur**	Rajasthan	3,046,189
3	**Lucknow**	Uttar Pradesh	2,817,105
4	Kanpur	Uttar Pradesh	2,767,348
5	Ghaziabad	Uttar Pradesh	2,358,525
6	Ludhiana	Punjab	1,618,879
7	Agra	Uttar Pradesh	1,585,704
8	Faridabad	Haryana	1,404,653
9	Meerut	Uttar Pradesh	1,226,709
10	Varanasi	Uttar Pradesh	1,201,815
11	**Srinagar**	Jammu and Kashmir	1,180,570
12	Amritsar	Punjab	1,132,76
13	Prayagraj	Uttar Pradesh	1,112,544
14	Jodhpur	Rajasthan	1,056,191
15	**Chandigarh**	Chandigarh	1,025,682
16	Kota	Rajasthan	1,001,694
17	Bareilly	Uttar Pradesh	898,167
18	Moradabad	Uttar Pradesh	889,810
19	Gurgaon	Haryana	876,824
20	Aligarh	Uttar Pradesh	872,575
21	Jalandhar	Punjab	862,196
22	Saharanpur	Uttar Pradesh	705,478
23	Gorakhpur	Uttar Pradesh	673,446
24	Bikaner	Rajasthan	644,406
25	Noida	Uttar Pradesh	637,272
26	Firozabad	Uttar Pradesh	603,797
27	**Dehradun**	Uttarakhand	578,420
28	Ajmer	Rajasthan	542,580
29	Loni	Uttar Pradesh	516,082
30	Jhansi	Uttar Pradesh	505,693
31	**Jammu**	Jammu and Kashmir	502,197

== See also ==
- List of most populous metropolitan areas in India
- List of cities in Uttar Pradesh by population
- List of cities in India
