= Punjab =

Geographical region in South Asia

Punjab Panjāb (Punjabi)
- Historical region
- Nickname: Land of the Five Rivers
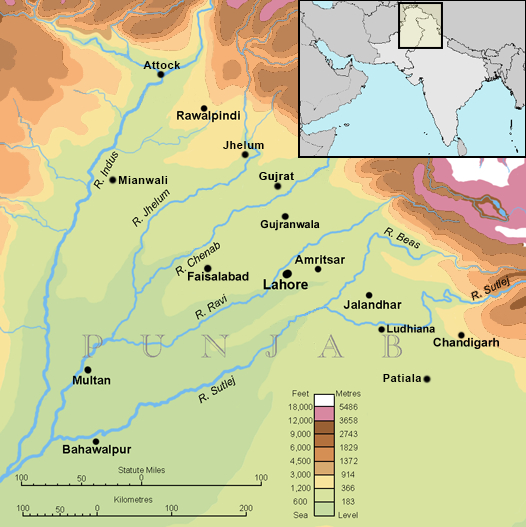
- Location of Punjab in South Asia
- Coordinates: 31°N 74°E
- Countries: Pakistan; India
- Largest city: Lahore
- Second largest city: Faisalabad
- Named for: Five tributaries of the Indus River

Area
  - Total: 458,354.5 km^{2} (176,971.7 sq mi)

Population (2011 India & 2017 Pakistan)
  - Total: c. 190 million (Note: Estimates from combining 2011 Indian census and 2017 Pakistani census with religious data amalgamated from Punjab, India, Punjab, Pakistan, Haryana, Delhi, Himachal Pradesh, Islamabad, and Chandigarh.); Pakistan 115 million India 75 million
  - Density: 1,070/km^{2} (2,800/sq mi)
- Demonym: Punjabi

Demographics
  - Ethnic groups: Punjabis; Minor: Balochs, Biharis, Dogras, Haryanvis, Himachalis, Hindkowans, Kashmiris, Muhajirs, Pashtuns, Saraikis, Sindhis
  - Languages: Punjabi, its dialects and varieties and others
  - Religions: Islam (64.72%); Hinduism (23.38%); Sikhism (10.1%); Christianity (1.49%); Others (0.31%)
- Time zones: UTC+05:30 (IST in India)
- UTC+05:00 (PKT in Pakistan)
- Demographics based on British Punjab's colonial borders

Punjab (/pʌnˈdʒɑːb/ pun-JAHB; Punjabi: Panjāb, pronounced [pəɲˈd͡ʒaːb]) (Note: From Persian پنج panj—meaning literally 'five'—and آب âb—meaning literally 'water' or 'river', thus translating as 'five waters'.) is a geographical, ethnolinguistic, and historical region in South Asia, located in its northwestern part, comprising areas of modern-day Pakistan and northwestern India. Lahore is its largest city and historic capital, with other major cities including Faisalabad, Rawalpindi, Gujranwala, Multan, and Sialkot in Pakistan; alongside Ludhiana, Amritsar, Chandigarh, Jalandhar, and Patiala in India.

Human settlements in Punjab developed along its five rivers as early as the ancient Indus Valley civilization, dating back to 3000 BCE, followed by migrations of the Indo-Aryan peoples. Agriculture has been the chief economic feature of the Punjab and is considered an important element of Punjabi culture. The Punjab emerged as an important agricultural region, especially following the Green Revolution during the mid-1960s to the mid-1970s, and has been described as the "breadbasket of both India and Pakistan."

The boundaries of the region are imprecisely defined and depend on historical and ethnographic definitions, and thus the geographical meaning of the term "Punjab" has changed over time. During the existence British India, from 1849 till 1901, the Punjab Province encompassed the present Indian states and union territories of Punjab, Haryana, Himachal Pradesh, Chandigarh, and Delhi, and the Pakistani regions of Punjab, Khyber Pakhtunkhwa and Islamabad Capital Territory. After the Partition of British India in 1947, it was divided into West and East Punjab; East Punjab was further divided into Punjab, Haryana and Himachal Pradesh in 1966 by India.

The predominant ethnolinguistic group of the Punjab region are the Punjabi people, who speak the Indo-Aryan Punjabi language of South Asia. Punjabi Muslims are the majority in Pakistani Punjab, while Punjabi Sikhs are the majority in Indian Punjab. Other religious groups include Punjabi Hindus, Punjabi Christians, Jains, Zoroastrians, Buddhists, and Ravidassias.

== Etymology ==
The name Punjab is derived from the Persian words panj (پنج), meaning “five”, and āb (آب), meaning “water”. cognates of the Sanskrit words (पञ्‍च, pañca, 'five' and अप्, áp, 'water'). The word pañj-āb is thus calque of Indo-Aryan pañca-áp and means "The Land of Five Waters", The name refers to the five major rivers historically associated with the region: the Jhelum, Chenab, Ravi, Sutlej, and Beas. The rivers and their tributaries have played an important role in shaping the geography, agriculture and settlement patterns of Punjab. All are tributaries of the Indus River, the Sutlej being the largest. (Note: Alternatively, Indus, Jhelum, Chenab, Ravi and Sutlej are counted among the five rivers of Punjab, with Beas considered as a tributary of Sutlej.) References to a land of five rivers are found in the Mahabharata, in which one of the regions is named as Panchanada (Sanskrit: पञ्चनद, romanised: pañca-nada, lit. 'five rivers'). The ancient Greeks referred to the region as Pentapotamía (Greek: Πενταποταμία, lit. 'land of five rivers'). Earlier, Punjab was also known as Sapta Sindhu in the Rigveda and Hapta Hendu in the Avesta, translating into "The Land of Seven Rivers"; the other two being Indus and Kabul which are included in the greater Punjab region.

The 14th-century author Ayn al-Mulk Mahru mentioned the wilayat (state) of Punjab (ولایت وسیعۀ پنجاب) while describing the Mongol invasion of the region. During the same period, the usage of name "Punjab" for the region is found in the travelogue of Ibn Battuta, and in the Tarikh-i-Wassaf of Ilkhanid historian Wassaf, albeit in a geographic sense. The current name gained currency during the Mughal Empire.

== History ==
=== Ancient period ===
The Punjab region is noted as the site of one of the earliest urban societies, the Indus Valley Civilization which flourished from about 3000 BCE and declined rapidly 1,000 years later, following the Indo-Aryan migrations that overran the region in waves between 1500 BCE and 500 BCE. Frequent intertribal wars stimulated the growth of larger groupings ruled by chieftains and kings, who ruled local kingdoms known as Mahajanapadas. The rise of kingdoms and dynasties in the Punjab is chronicled in the ancient Hindu epics, particularly the Mahabharata. The epic battles described in the Mahabharata are chronicled as being fought in what is now the state of Haryana and historic Punjab. The Gandharas, Kambojas, Trigartas, Andhra, Pauravas, Bahlikas (Bactrian settlers of the Punjab), Yaudheyas, and others sided with the Kauravas in the great battle fought at Kurukshetra. According to Fauja Singh and L. M. Joshi: "There is no doubt that the Kambojas, Daradas, Kaikayas, Andhra, Pauravas, Yaudheyas, Malavas, Saindhavas, and Kurus had jointly contributed to the heroic tradition and composite culture of ancient Punjab."

==== Invasion of Alexander the Great ====
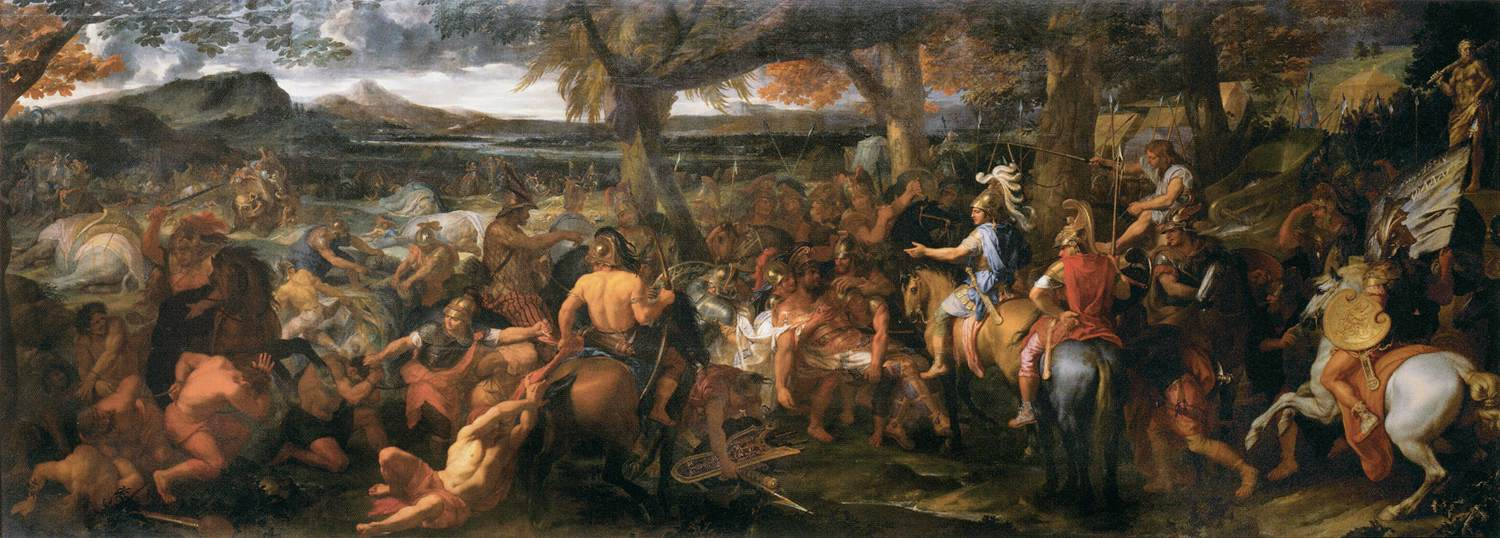
A 17th-century painting by Charles Le Brun depicting the battle of King Porus against Alexander the Great.

In the 4th century BCE Punjab was invaded by Alexander the Great. Omphis, the king of Taxila accepted his suzerainty while Porus refused it. His kingdom spanned between rivers Hydaspes (Jhelum) and Acesines (Chenab); Strabo had held the territory to contain almost 300 cities. He (alongside Abisares) had a hostile relationship with the kingdom of Taxila which was ruled by his extended family. When the armies of Alexander crossed the Indus in its eastward migration, probably in Udabhandapura, he was greeted by the Omphis. Omphis had hoped to force both Porus and Abisares into submission leveraging the might of Alexander's forces and diplomatic missions were mounted, but while Abisares accepted the submission, Porus refused. This led Alexander to seek for a face-off with Porus. Thus began the Battle of the Hydaspes in 326 BCE; the exact site remains unknown. The battle is thought to be resulted in a decisive Greek victory; however, A. B. Bosworth warns against an uncritical reading of Greek sources that were exaggerated.

Alexander later founded two cities—Nicaea at the site of victory and Bucephalous at the battle-ground, in memory of his horse, who died soon after the battle. (Note: Craterus supervised the construction. These cities are yet to be identified.) Later, tetradrachms would be minted depicting Alexander on horseback, armed with a sarissa and attacking a pair of Indians on an elephant. Porus refused to surrender and wandered about atop an elephant, until he was wounded and his force routed. When asked by Alexander how he wished to be treated, Porus replied "Treat me as a king would treat another king". Despite the apparently one-sided results, Alexander was impressed by Porus and chose to not depose him. Not only was his territory reinstated but also expanded with Alexander's forces annexing the territories of Glausaes, who ruled to the northeast of Porus' kingdom.

After Alexander's death in 323 BCE, Perdiccas became the regent of his empire, and after Perdiccas's murder in 321 BCE, Antipater became the new regent. According to Diodorus, Antipater recognized Porus's authority over the territories along the Indus River. However, Eudemus, who had served as Alexander's satrap in the Punjab region, treacherously killed Porus.

==== Mauryan Empire ====
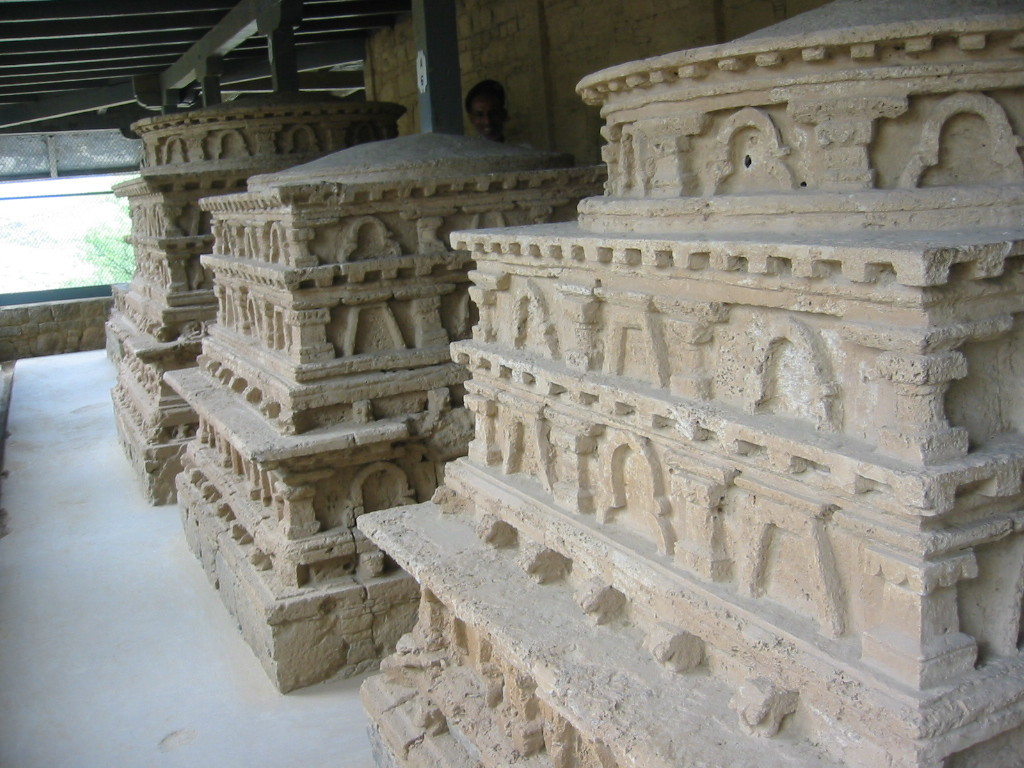
Taxila in Pakistan is a World Heritage Site.

Chandragupta Maurya had established his empire around 320 BCE. The early life of Chandragupta Maurya is not clear. Per legendary accounts Kautilya, the purported author of the Arthashastra, enrolled the young Chandragupta in the university at Taxila to educate him in the arts, sciences, logic, mathematics, warfare, and administration. Megasthenes' account, as it has survived in Greek texts that quote him, states that Alexander the Great and Chandragupta met, which if true would mean his rule started earlier than 321 BCE. As Alexander never crossed the Beas River, so his territory probably lay in the Punjab region. With the help of the small Janapadas of Punjab, he had gone on to conquer much of the Indian subcontinent. He then defeated the Nanda rulers in Pataliputra to capture the throne. Chandragupta Maurya fought Alexander's successor in the east, Seleucus when the latter invaded. In a peace treaty, Seleucus ceded all territories west of the Indus and offered a marriage, including a portion of Bactria, while Chandragupta gifted Seleucus 500 elephants. The chief of the Mauryan military was also always a Yaudheyan warrior according to the Bijaygadh Pillar inscription, which states that the Yaudheyas elected their own chief who also served as the general for the Mauryans. The Mauryan military was also made up vastly of men from the Punjab Janapadas.

Chandragupta's rule was very well organised. The Mauryans had an autocratic and centralised administration system, aided by a council of ministers, and also a well-established espionage system. Much of the Mauryan rule had a strong bureaucracy that had regulated tax collection, trade and commerce, industrial activities, mining, statistics and data, maintenance of public places, and upkeep of temples.

=== Medieval period ===
==== Hindu Shahis (c. 820–1022 CE) ====
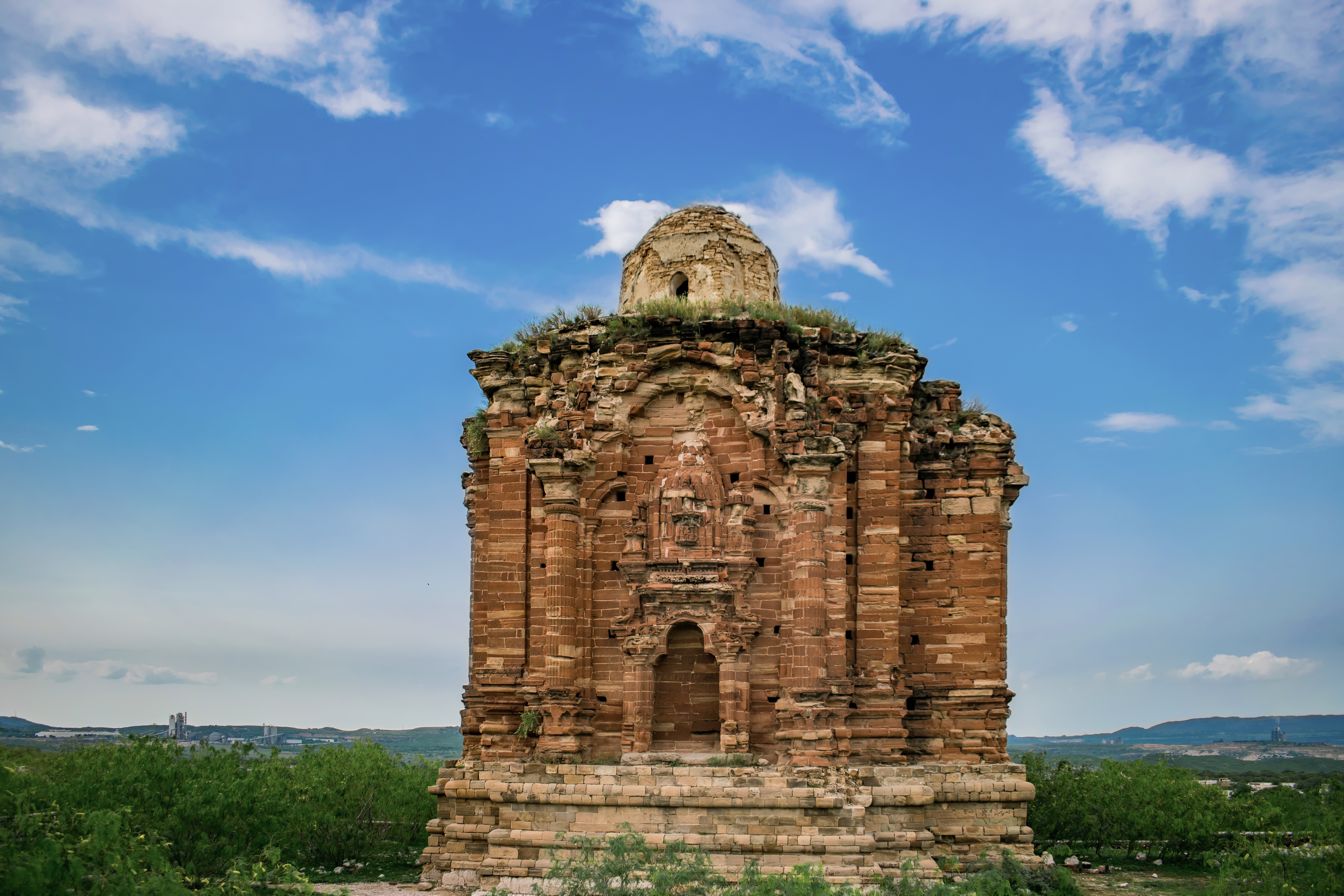
The Malot Temple, constructed by Odi Shahi dynasty in Gandhara-Nagara style in the 10th century CE

In the 9th century, the Odi Shahi dynasty originating from Gandhara replaced the Takka kingdom, ruling western Punjab along with Kabulistan. The tribe of Gakhars formed a large part of the Hindu Shahi army according to the Persian historian Firishta. The most notable rulers of the empire were Lalliya, Bhimadeva and Jayapala who were accredited for military victories.

Lalliya had reclaimed the territory at and around Kabul between 879 and 901 CE after it had been lost under his predecessor to the Saffarid dynasty. He was described as a fearsome Shahi. Two of his ministers reconstructed by Rahman as Toramana and Asata are said to of have taken advantage of Amr al-Layth's preoccupation with rebellions in Khorasan, by successfully raiding Ghazna around 900 CE.

After a defeat in Zabulistan suffered by the Shahi ally Lawik, Bhimadeva mounted a combined attack around 963 CE. Abu Ishaq Ibrahim was expelled from Ghazna and Shahi-Lawik strongholds were restored in Kabul and adjacent areas. This victory appears to have been commemorated in the Hund Slab Inscription (HSI).

==== Ghaznavids and Ghuruds ====
The Ghaznavids in the tenth century overthrew the Hindu Shahis and consequently ruled for 157 years in western Punjab, gradually declining as a power until the Ghurid conquest of Lahore by Muhammad of Ghor in 1186, deposing the last Ghaznavid ruler Khusrau Malik. Following the death of Muhammad of Ghor in 1206 by Khokhar or Isma'ili assassins near the Jhelum river, the Ghurid state fragmented and was replaced in northern India by the Delhi Sultanate.

==== Delhi Sultanate ====
The Tughlaq dynasty was formally founded in 1320 in Delhi when Ghazi Malik assumed the throne under the title of Ghiyath al-Din Tughluq after defeating Khusrau Khan at the Battle of Lahrawat.

During Ghazi Malik's reign, in 1321 Jauna Khan, later known as Muhammad bin Tughlaq, expanded control over Deccan and Bengal. After his father's death in 1325 CE, Muhammad bin Tughlaq assumed power and his rule saw the empire expand to most of the Indian subcontinent, its peak in terms of geographical reach. He attacked and plundered Malwa, Gujarat, Lakhnauti, Chittagong, Mithila and many other regions in India. His distant campaigns were expensive, although each raid and attack on non-Muslim kingdoms brought new looted wealth and ransom payments from captured people. The extended empire was difficult to retain, and rebellions became commonplace all over the Indian subcontinent. Muhammad bin Tughlaq died in March 1351 while trying to chase and punish people for rebellion and their refusal to pay taxes in Sindh and Gujarat.

After Muhammad bin Tughlaq's death, the Tughlaq empire was in a state of disarray with many regions assuming independence; it was at this point that Firuz Shah Tughlaq, Ghazi Malik's nephew, took reign. His father's name was Rajab (the younger brother of Ghazi Malik) who had the title Sipahsalar. His mother Naila was a Punjabi Bhatti princess (daughter of Rana Mal) from Dipalpur and Abohar according to the historian William Crooke. He laid siege to the Kangra Fort and forced Nagarkot to pay tribute. During this time, Tatar Khan of Greater Khorasan attacked Punjab, but he was defeated and his face slashed by the sword given by Feroz Shah Tughlaq to Raja Kailas Pal who ruled the Nagarkot region in Punjab.

Khizr Khan established the Sayyid dynasty, the fourth dynasty of the Delhi Sultanate after the fall of the Tughlaqs. Following Timur's 1398 sack of Delhi, he appointed Khizr Khan as deputy of Multan. He held Lahore, Dipalpur, Multan and upper Sindh. Khizr Khan captured Delhi on 28 May 1414 thereby establishing the Sayyid dynasty. Khizr Khan did not take up the title of sultan, but continued the fiction of his allegiance to Timur as Rayat-i-Ala(vassal) of the Timurids — initially that of Timur, and later his son Shah Rukh. After the accession of Khizr Khan, the Punjab, Uttar Pradesh and Sindh were reunited under the Delhi Sultanate, where he spent his time subduing rebellions. Punjab was the powerbase of Khizr Khan and his successors as the bulk of the Delhi army during their reigns came from Multan and Dipalpur.

Khizr Khan was succeeded by his son Mubarak Shah after his death on 20 May 1421. Mubarak Shah referred to himself as Muizz-ud-Din Mubarak Shah on his coins, removing the Timurid name with the name of the Caliph, and declared himself a Shah. He defeated the advancing Hoshang Shah Ghori, ruler of Malwa Sultanate and forced him to pay heavy tribute early in his reign. Mubarak Shah also put down the rebellion of Jasrath Khokhar and managed to fend off multiple invasions by the Timurids of Kabul.

The last ruler of the Sayyids, Ala-ud-Din, voluntarily abdicated the throne of the Delhi Sultanate in favour of Bahlul Khan Lodi on 19 April 1451, and left for Badaun, where he died in 1478.

==== Langah Sultanate ====
In 1445, Rai Sahra Langah, chief of Langah (a Jat Zamindar tribe), established the Langah Sultanate in Multan after the fall of the Sayyid dynasty. Husseyn Langah I (reigned 1456–1502) was the second ruler of Langah Sultanate. He undertook military campaigns in Punjab and captured Chiniot and Shorkot from the Lodis. Shah Husayn successfully repulsed attempted invasion by the Lodis led by Tatar Khan and Barbak Shah, as well as his daughter Zeerak Rumman.

=== Early modern period ===
==== Mughal Empire ====
The Mughals came to power in the early 16th century and gradually expanded to control all of the Punjab from their capital at Lahore. One of Akbar's generals, Shahbaz Khan Kamboh was a Punjabi as were Prime Ministers of Shah Jahan, Saadullah Khan and Wazir Khan. The Mughal Empire ruled the region until it was severely weakened in the eighteenth century. Mughal authority was extinct in Punjab after the death of Adina Arain. As Mughal power weakened, Afghan rulers took control of the region.

Following the disintegration of the Mughal Empire, the Dīwān of Shrine of Baba Farid was able to forge a political independent state centered on Pakpattan. In 1757, Dīwān 'Abd as-Subḥān gathered an army of his Jat murīds, attacked the Raja of Bikaner, and thereby expanded the shrine's territorial holdings for the first time east of the Sutlej. Around 1776, the Dīwān, supported mainly by his Wattu murīds, successfully repelled an attack by the Sikh Nakai Misl, resulting in the death of the Nakai leader, Heera Singh Sandhu.

The Sial dynasty was established by the 13 Sial Chief Nawab Walidad Khan Sial in 1723. He gradually gained control of the lower Rachna doab, including the cities of Chiniot, Pindi Bhattian, Jhang and Mankera. Next chief, Inayatullah Khan (r. 1747– 1787) was a successful general who won 22 battles against Bhangi Misl and the Multan chiefs. The Sikh Empire invaded Jhang multiple times from 1801 to 1816 and annexed by the dynasty; Ahmad Khan Sial was awarded a Jagir by Ranjit Singh.

=== Modern period ===
==== Sikh Empire ====
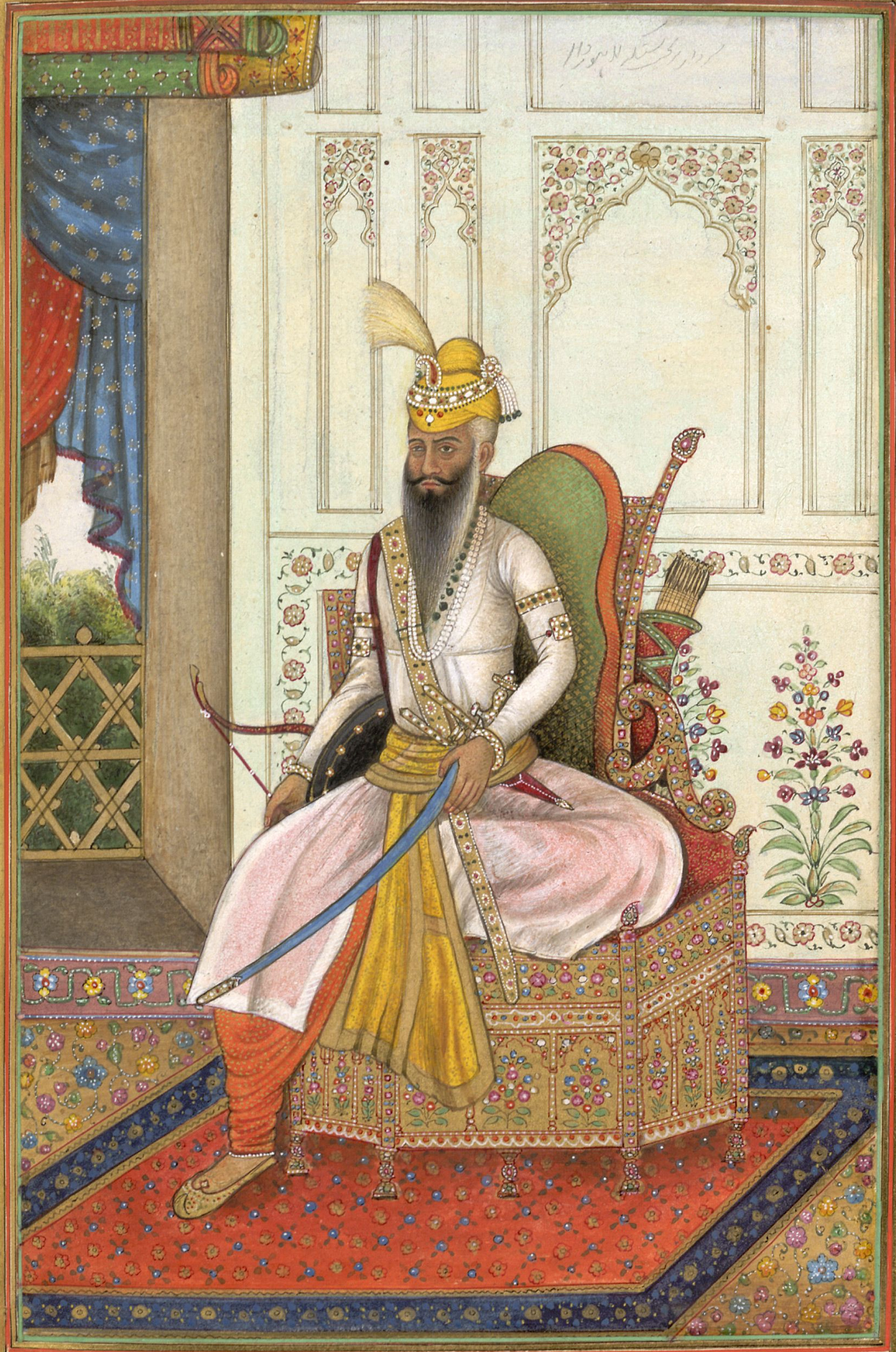
Illustration of Ranjit Singh, founder of the Sikh Empire

Contested by the Sikhs and Afghans, the region was the center of the growing influence of the misls, who expanded and established the Sikh Confederacy as the Mughals and Afghans weakened, ultimately ruling the Punjab, Peshawar, and territories north into the Himalayas.In the 19th century, Maharajah Ranjit Singh established the Sikh Empire based in the Punjab. The empire existed from 1799, when Ranjit Singh captured Lahore, to 1849, when it was defeated and conquered in the Second Anglo-Sikh War. It was forged on the foundations of the Khalsa from a collection of autonomous Sikh misls. At its peak in the 19th century, the Empire extended from the Khyber Pass in the west to western Tibet in the east, and from Mithankot in the south to Kashmir in the north. It was divided into four provinces: Lahore, in Punjab, which became the Sikh capital; Multan, also in Punjab; Peshawar; and Kashmir from 1799 to 1849. Religiously diverse, with an estimated population of 3.5 million in 1831 (making it the 19th most populous country at the time), it was the last major region of the Indian subcontinent to be annexed by the British Empire.

==== British Punjab ====
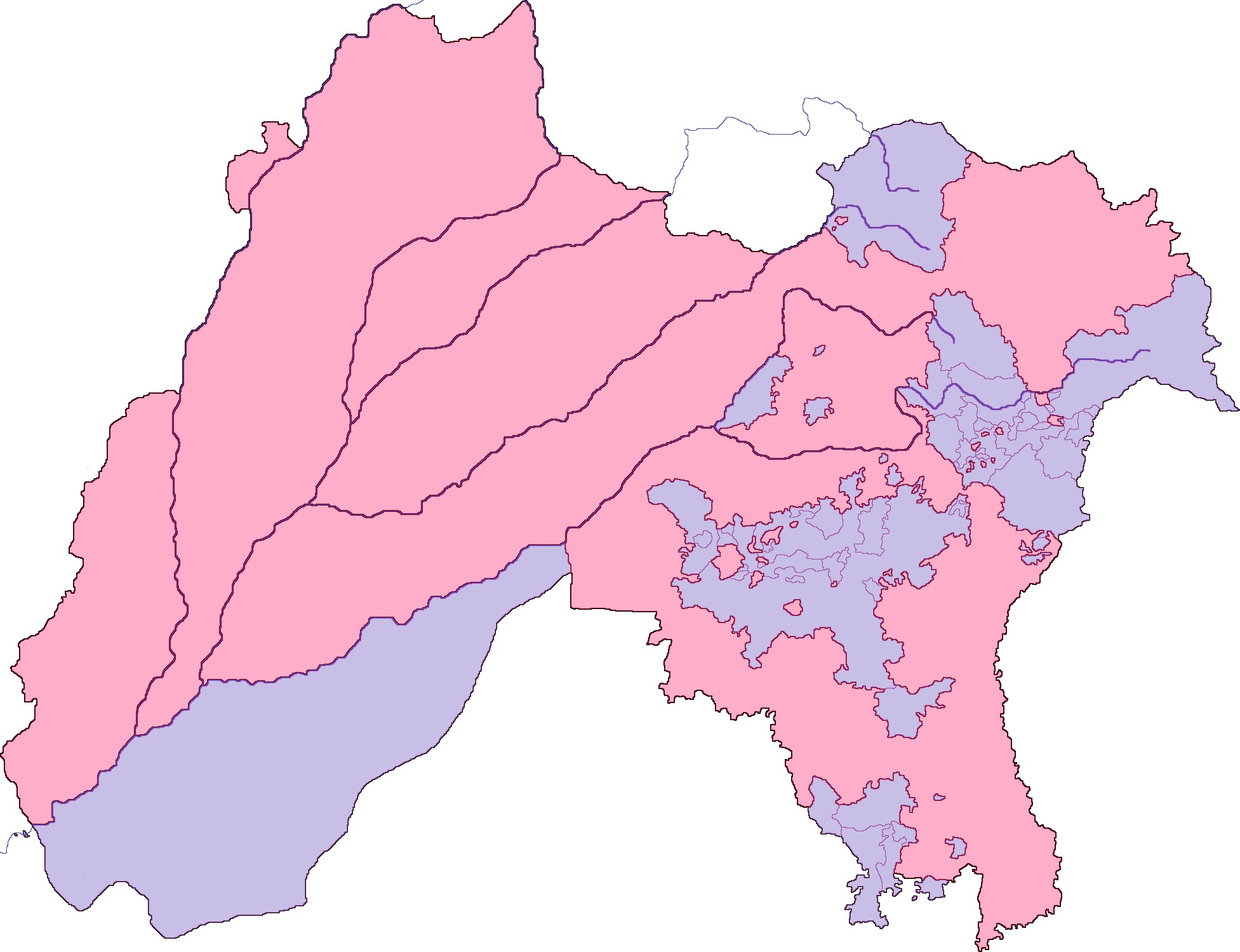
Map of the Punjab Province in 1947. Purple showing princely states, red showing direct British rule.

The Sikh Empire ruled the Punjab until the British annexed it in 1849 following the First and Second Anglo-Sikh Wars. Most of the Punjabi homeland formed a province of British India, though a number of small princely states retained local rulers who recognized British authority. The Punjab with its rich farmlands became one of the most important colonial assets. Lahore was a noted center of learning and culture, and Rawalpindi became an important military installation. Most Punjabis supported the British during World War I, providing men and resources to the war effort even though the Punjab remained a source of anti colonial activities. Disturbances in the region increased as the war continued. At the end of the war, high casualty rates, heavy taxation, inflation, and a widespread influenza epidemic disrupted Punjabi society. In 1919, Colonel Reginald Dyer ordered troops under command to fire on a crowd of demonstrators, mostly Sikhs in Amritsar. The Jallianwala massacre fueled the Indian independence movement. Nationalists declared the independence of India from Lahore in 1930 but were quickly suppressed. When the Second World War broke out, nationalism in British India had already divided into religious movements. Many Sikhs and other minorities supported the Hindus, who promised a secular multicultural and multireligious society, and Muslim leaders in Lahore passed a resolution to work for a Muslim Pakistan, making the Punjab region a center of growing conflict between Indian and Pakistani nationalists. At the end of the war, the British granted separate independence to India and Pakistan, setting off massive communal violence as Muslims fled to Pakistan and Hindu and Sikh Punjabis fled east to India.

The British Raj had major political, cultural, philosophical, and literary consequences in the Punjab, including the establishment of a new system of education. During the independence movement, many Punjabis played a significant role, including Madan Lal Dhingra, Sukhdev Thapar, Ajit Singh Sandhu, Bhagat Singh, Udham Singh, Kartar Singh Sarabha, Bhai Parmanand, Choudhry Rahmat Ali, and Lala Lajpat Rai. At the time of partition in 1947, the province was split into East and West Punjab. East Punjab (48%) became part of India, while West Punjab (52%) became part of Pakistan. The Punjab bore the brunt of the civil unrest following partition, with casualties estimated to be in the millions.

The struggle for Indian independence witnessed competing and conflicting interests in the Punjab. The landed elites of the Muslim, Hindu and Sikh communities had loyally collaborated with the British since annexation, supported the Unionist Party and were hostile to the Congress party–led independence movement. Amongst the peasantry and urban middle classes, the Hindus were the most active National Congress supporters, the Sikhs flocked to the Akali movement whilst the Muslims eventually supported the Muslim League. Since the partition of the sub-continent had been decided, special meetings of the Western and Eastern Section of the Legislative Assembly were held on 23 June 1947 to decide whether or not the Province of the Punjab be partitioned. After voting on both sides, partition was decided and the existing Punjab Legislative Assembly was also divided into West Punjab Legislative Assembly and the East Punjab Legislative Assembly. This last Assembly before independence, held its last sitting on 4 July 1947.

Another major consequence of partition was the sudden shift towards religious homogeneity occurred in all districts across Punjab owing to the new international border that cut through the province. This rapid demographic shift was primarily due to wide scale migration but also caused by large-scale religious cleansing riots which were witnessed across the region at the time. According to historical demographer Tim Dyson, in the eastern regions of Punjab that ultimately became Indian Punjab following independence, districts that were 66% Hindu in 1941 became 80% Hindu in 1951; those that were 20% Sikh became 50% Sikh in 1951. Conversely, in the western regions of Punjab that ultimately became Pakistani Punjab, all districts became almost exclusively Muslim by 1951.

== Geography ==
The geographical definition of the term "Punjab" has changed over time. In the 16th century Mughal Empire it referred to a relatively smaller area between the Indus and the Sutlej rivers.

=== Sikh Empire ===
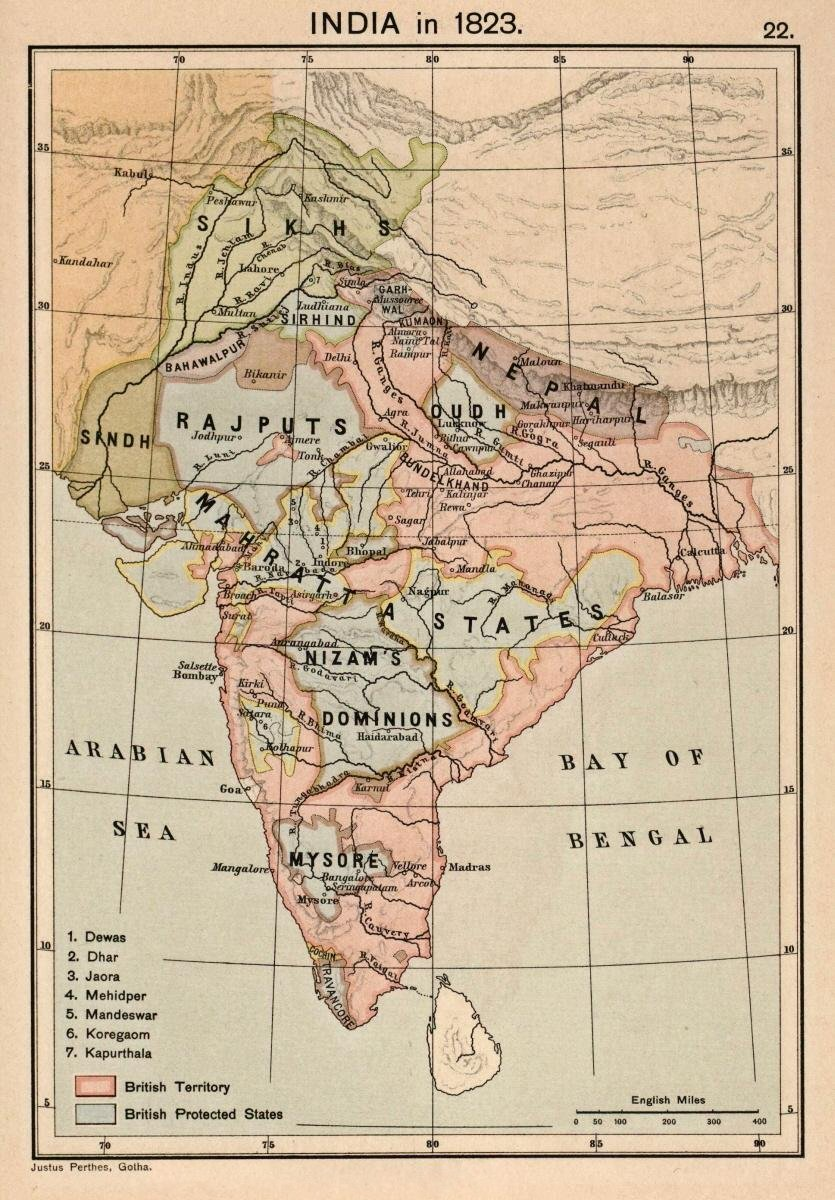
Sikh Empire (green) in northwest India in 1823

At its height in the first half of the 19th century, the Sikh Empire spanned a total of over 200,000 sq mi (520,000 km^{2}).

The Punjab was a region straddling India and the Afghan Durrani Empire. The following modern-day political divisions made up the historical Punjab region during the Sikh Empire:

- Punjab region, to Mithankot in the south
  - Punjab, Pakistan, excluding Bahawalpur State
  - Punjab, India, south to areas just across the Sutlej river
  - Himachal Pradesh, India, south to areas just across the Sutlej river
  - Jammu Division, Jammu and Kashmir, India and Pakistan (1808–1846)
- Kashmir region, Pakistan/China
  - Kashmir Valley, India (1819–1846)
  - Gilgit, Gilgit–Baltistan, Pakistan (1842–1846)
  - Ladakh, India (1834–1846)
- Khyber Pass, Pakistan/Afghanistan
  - Peshawar, Pakistan (taken in 1818, retaken in 1834)
  - Khyber Pakhtunkhwa and the Federally Administered Tribal Areas, Pakistan (documented from Hazara, taken in 1818, again in 1836 to Bannu)
- Parts of Western Tibet, China (briefly in 1841, to Taklakot)

After Ranjit Singh's death in 1839, the empire was severely weakened by internal divisions and political mismanagement. This opportunity was used by the East India Company to launch the First and Second Anglo-Sikh Wars. The country was finally annexed and dissolved at the end of the Second Anglo-Sikh War in 1849 into separate princely states and the province of Punjab. Eventually, a Lieutenant Governorship was formed in Lahore as a direct representative of the Crown.

=== Punjab (British India) ===
In British India, until the Partition of India in 1947, the Punjab Province was geographically a triangular tract of country of which the Indus River and its tributary the Sutlej formed the two sides up to their confluence, the base of the triangle in the north being the Lower Himalayan Range between those two rivers. Moreover, the province as constituted under British rule also included a large tract outside these boundaries. Along the northern border, Himalayan ranges divided it from Kashmir and Tibet. On the west it was separated from the North-West Frontier Province by the Indus, until it reached the border of Dera Ghazi Khan District, which was divided from Baluchistan by the Sulaiman Range. To the south lay Sindh and Rajputana, while on the east the rivers Jumna and Tons separated it from the United Provinces. In total Punjab had an area of approximately 357 000 km square about the same size as modern day Germany, being one of the largest provinces of the British Raj.

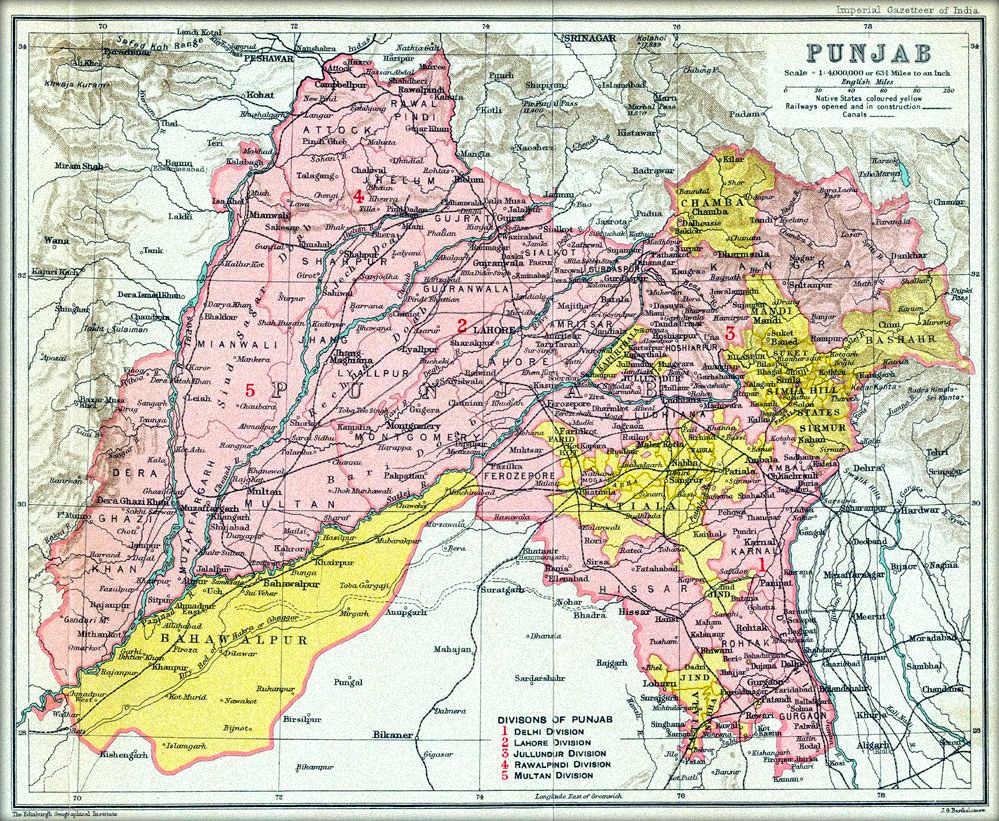
Map of the Punjab Province (British India)

It encompassed the present day Indian states of Punjab, Haryana, Chandigarh, Delhi, and some parts of Himachal Pradesh which were merged with Punjab by the British for administrative purposes (but excluding the former princely states which were later combined into the Patiala and East Punjab States Union) and the Pakistani regions of the Punjab, Islamabad Capital Territory and Khyber Pakhtunkhwa.

In 1901 the frontier districts beyond the Indus were separated from Punjab and made into a new province: the North-West Frontier Province. Subsequently, Punjab was divided into four natural geographical divisions by colonial officials on the decadal census data:

1. Indo-Gangetic Plain West geographical division (including Hisar district, Loharu State, Rohtak district, Dujana State, Gurgaon district, Pataudi State, Delhi, Karnal district, Jalandhar district, Kapurthala State, Ludhiana district, Malerkotla State, Firozpur district, Faridkot State, Patiala State, Jind State, Nabha State, Lahore District, Amritsar district, Gujranwala District, and Sheikhupura district);
2. Himalayan geographical division (including Nahan State, Simla District, Simla Hill States, Kangra district, Mandi State, Suket State, and Chamba State);
3. Sub-Himalayan geographical division (including Ambala district, Kalsia State, Hoshiarpur district, Gurdaspur District, Sialkot District, Gujrat District, Jhelum District, Rawalpindi District, and Attock District;
4. North-West Dry Area geographical division (including Montgomery District, Shahpur District, Mianwali District, Lyallpur District, Jhang District, Multan District, Bahawalpur State, Muzaffargarh District, and Dera Ghazi Khan District).

=== Major cities ===
Historically, Lahore has been the capital of the Punjab region and continues to be the most populous city in the region, with a population of 11 million for the city proper. Faisalabad is the 2nd most populous city and largest industrial hub in this region. Other major cities are Rawalpindi, Gujranwala, Multan, Ludhiana, Amritsar, Jalandhar, and Chandigarh are the other cities in Punjab with a city-proper population of over a million.

== Climate ==
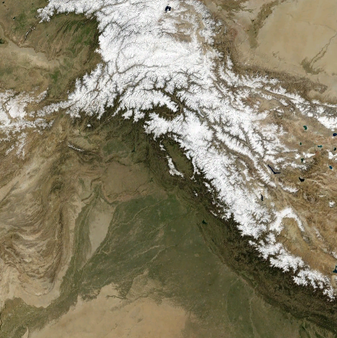
The snow-covered Himalayas

The climate has significant impact on the economy of Punjab, particularly for agriculture in the region. Climate is not uniform over the whole region, as the areas adjacent to the Himalayas generally receive heavier rainfall than those at a distance. The Köppen climate classification generally classifies Punjab as having either a monsoon-influenced humid subtropical climate (Köppen: Cwa) or a hot semi-arid climate (Köppen: BSh).

There are three main seasons and two transitional periods. During summer, from mid-April to the end of June, the temperature may reach 48 °C (118 °F). The monsoon season, from July to September, is a period of heavy rainfall, providing water for crops in addition to the supply from canals and irrigation systems. The transitional period after the monsoon season is cool and mild, leading to the winter season, when the temperature in January falls to 5 °C (41 °F) at night and 12 °C (54 °F) by day. During the transitional period from winter to summer, sudden hailstorms and heavy showers may occur, causing damage to crops.

=== Western Punjab ===
Climate data for Islamabad (1991–2020 normals)
Month	Jan	Feb	Mar	Apr	May	Jun	Jul	Aug	Sep	Oct	Nov	Dec	Year
Record high °C (°F)	30.1 (86.2)	30.0 (86.0)	37.0 (98.6)	44.0 (111.2)	45.6 (114.1)	46.6 (115.9)	45.0 (113.0)	42.0 (107.6)	38.1 (100.6)	38.0 (100.4)	32.2 (90.0)	28.3 (82.9)	46.6 (115.9)
Mean daily maximum °C (°F)	17.7 (63.9)	20.0 (68.0)	24.8 (76.6)	30.6 (87.1)	36.1 (97.0)	38.3 (100.9)	35.4 (95.7)	33.9 (93.0)	33.4 (92.1)	30.9 (87.6)	25.4 (77.7)	20.4 (68.7)	28.9 (84.0)
Daily mean °C (°F)	10.7 (51.3)	13.4 (56.1)	18.1 (64.6)	23.6 (74.5)	28.7 (83.7)	31.4 (88.5)	30.1 (86.2)	29.1 (84.4)	27.6 (81.7)	23.3 (73.9)	17.3 (63.1)	12.5 (54.5)	22.2 (72.0)
Mean daily minimum °C (°F)	3.6 (38.5)	6.8 (44.2)	11.4 (52.5)	16.6 (61.9)	21.5 (70.7)	24.5 (76.1)	24.9 (76.8)	24.2 (75.6)	21.7 (71.1)	15.6 (60.1)	9.1 (48.4)	4.7 (40.5)	15.4 (59.7)
Record low °C (°F)	−6 (21)	−5.0 (23.0)	−3.8 (25.2)	2.1 (35.8)	5.5 (41.9)	13.0 (55.4)	15.2 (59.4)	14.5 (58.1)	13.3 (55.9)	5.7 (42.3)	−0.6 (30.9)	−2.8 (27.0)	−6.0 (21.2)
Average precipitation mm (inches)	55.2 (2.17)	93.4 (3.68)	95.2 (3.75)	58.1 (2.29)	39.9 (1.57)	78.4 (3.09)	310.6 (12.23)	317.0 (12.48)	135.4 (5.33)	34.4 (1.35)	17.7 (0.70)	25.9 (1.02)	1,261.2 (49.65)
Average precipitation days (≥ 1.0 mm)	4.7	6.3	7.3	6.1	5.2	6.0	12.3	11.9	6.4	2.9	2.0	2.0	73.1
Average relative humidity (%)	67	63	62	52	42	44	68	76	67	62	63	66	61
Mean monthly sunshine hours	195.7	187.1	202.3	252.4	319.0	300.1	264.4	250.7	262.2	275.5	247.9	195.6	2,952.9
Mean daily sunshine hours	6.3	6.6	6.5	8.4	10.1	10.0	8.5	8.1	8.7	8.9	8.3	6.3	8.1
Source 1: NOAA (sun, 1961-1990), Deutscher Wetterdienst (humidity 1973-1990, daily sun 1961-1990)
Source 2: PMD (extremes)

=== Central Punjab ===
Climate data for Lahore (1991–2020 normals, extremes 1931–present)
Month	Jan	Feb	Mar	Apr	May	Jun	Jul	Aug	Sep	Oct	Nov	Dec	Year
Record high °C (°F)	27.8 (82.0)	33.3 (91.9)	37.8 (100.0)	46.1 (115.0)	48.3 (118.9)	47.2 (117.0)	46.1 (115.0)	42.8 (109.0)	41.7 (107.1)	40.6 (105.1)	35.0 (95.0)	30.0 (86.0)	48.3 (118.9)
Mean daily maximum °C (°F)	18.4 (65.1)	22.2 (72.0)	27.5 (81.5)	34.2 (93.6)	38.9 (102.0)	38.9 (102.0)	35.6 (96.1)	34.7 (94.5)	34.4 (93.9)	32.4 (90.3)	27.1 (80.8)	21.4 (70.5)	30.5 (86.9)
Daily mean °C (°F)	13.1 (55.6)	16.5 (61.7)	21.6 (70.9)	27.7 (81.9)	32.3 (90.1)	33.2 (91.8)	31.3 (88.3)	30.8 (87.4)	29.9 (85.8)	26.3 (79.3)	20.4 (68.7)	15.1 (59.2)	24.9 (76.7)
Mean daily minimum °C (°F)	7.6 (45.7)	10.8 (51.4)	15.7 (60.3)	21.1 (70.0)	25.6 (78.1)	27.4 (81.3)	27.1 (80.8)	26.9 (80.4)	25.3 (77.5)	20.1 (68.2)	13.7 (56.7)	8.8 (47.8)	19.2 (66.5)
Record low °C (°F)	−2.2 (28.0)	0.0 (32.0)	2.8 (37.0)	10.0 (50.0)	14.0 (57.2)	17.8 (64.0)	20.0 (68.0)	19.0 (66.2)	16.7 (62.1)	8.3 (46.9)	1.0 (33.8)	−1.1 (30.0)	−2.2 (28.0)
Average precipitation mm (inches)	21.9 (0.86)	31.5 (1.24)	31.5 (1.24)	19.5 (0.77)	17.7 (0.70)	73.8 (2.91)	188.6 (7.43)	177.1 (6.97)	88.6 (3.49)	10.3 (0.41)	6.9 (0.27)	6.8 (0.27)	674.2 (26.56)
Average precipitation days (≥ 1.0 mm)	2.5	3.5	3.6	2.8	2.9	5.0	9.1	8.7	4.9	1.1	1.9	1.1	47.1
Average relative humidity (%)	66	58	53	42	36	42	66	70	63	58	53	67	56
Mean monthly sunshine hours	218.8	215.0	245.8	256.1	308.3	269.0	227.5	234.9	265.6	290.0	229.6	222.9	2,983.5
Mean daily sunshine hours	7.1	7.6	7.9	9.2	9.9	9.0	7.3	7.6	8.9	9.4	8.7	7.2	8.3
Source 1: NOAA (sun 1961–1990), Deutscher Wetterdienst (humidity 1951–1990, daily sun 1961–1990)
Source 2: PMD

=== Eastern Punjab ===
Climate data for Patiala (1991–2020, extremes 1901–2020)
Month	Jan	Feb	Mar	Apr	May	Jun	Jul	Aug	Sep	Oct	Nov	Dec	Year
Record high °C (°F)	28.4 (83.1)	33.3 (91.9)	37.8 (100.0)	44.6 (112.3)	47.0 (116.6)	46.4 (115.5)	45.0 (113.0)	42.7 (108.9)	40.6 (105.1)	38.9 (102.0)	35.4 (95.7)	29.4 (84.9)	47.0 (116.6)
Mean daily maximum °C (°F)	18.7 (65.7)	22.5 (72.5)	28.0 (82.4)	35.2 (95.4)	39.3 (102.7)	38.3 (100.9)	34.4 (93.9)	33.4 (92.1)	33.1 (91.6)	32.6 (90.7)	27.7 (81.9)	21.2 (70.2)	30.3 (86.5)
Daily mean °C (°F)	12.1 (53.8)	15.9 (60.6)	21.0 (69.8)	27.0 (80.6)	31.7 (89.1)	31.9 (89.4)	30.3 (86.5)	29.2 (84.6)	28.1 (82.6)	24.7 (76.5)	19.4 (66.9)	14.0 (57.2)	23.8 (74.8)
Mean daily minimum °C (°F)	6.7 (44.1)	9.5 (49.1)	14.1 (57.4)	19.3 (66.7)	24.2 (75.6)	26.5 (79.7)	27.0 (80.6)	26.3 (79.3)	24.3 (75.7)	18.2 (64.8)	11.9 (53.4)	7.8 (46.0)	18.0 (64.4)
Record low °C (°F)	−0.9 (30.4)	0.1 (32.2)	3.5 (38.3)	7.7 (45.9)	15.0 (59.0)	18.2 (64.8)	20.4 (68.7)	20.1 (68.2)	15.0 (59.0)	10.0 (50.0)	3.7 (38.7)	0.4 (32.7)	−0.9 (30.4)
Average rainfall mm (inches)	26.3 (1.04)	31.9 (1.26)	35.7 (1.41)	20.6 (0.81)	28.5 (1.12)	111.6 (4.39)	225.8 (8.89)	204.5 (8.05)	158.9 (6.26)	13.1 (0.52)	5.7 (0.22)	12.9 (0.51)	875.6 (34.47)
Average precipitation days (≥ 0.3 mm)	3.5	4.8	4.7	4.0	4.2	7.2	11.1	11.2	6.3	1.5	1.0	1.5	61.0
Average relative humidity (%) (at 17:30 IST)	70	62	53	33	32	46	69	75	71	59	59	69	58
Source 1: India Meteorological Department
Source 2: Tokyo Climate Center (mean temperatures 1991–2020)

== Demographics ==
=== Languages ===
The dominant mother tongue in each District of Pakistan, according to the 2017 Pakistan Census

The major language is Punjabi, which is written in India with the Gurmukhi script, and in Pakistan using the Shahmukhi script. The Punjabi language has official status and is widely used in education and administration in Indian Punjab, whereas in Pakistani Punjab these roles are instead fulfilled by the Urdu language and Punjabi is seen as a vernacular language

Several languages closely related to Punjabi are spoken in the various parts of the region. Dogri, Kangri, and other western Pahari dialects are spoken in the north-central and northeastern parts of the region, while Bagri is spoken in south-central and southeastern sections. Meanwhile, Saraiki is generally spoken across a wide belt covering the southwest, while in the northwest there are large pockets containing speakers of Hindko and Pahari-Pothwari.

Linguistic demographics of Punjab Province
Language	Percentage
Language	1911
Punjabi (Note: Standard Punjabi: 58.34% Lahnda: (Note: Western Punjabi languages and dialects including Saraiki, Hindko and Pahari-Pothwari, and other related languages or dialects) 17.59%)	75.93%
Western Hindi (Note: Including Hindustani (Hindi and Urdu), Braj Bhasha, Haryanvi, and other related languages or dialects)	15.82%
Western Pahari	4.11%
Rajasthani	3.0%
Balochi	0.29%
Pashto	0.28%
English	0.15%
Other	0.42%

=== Religions ===
==== Background ====
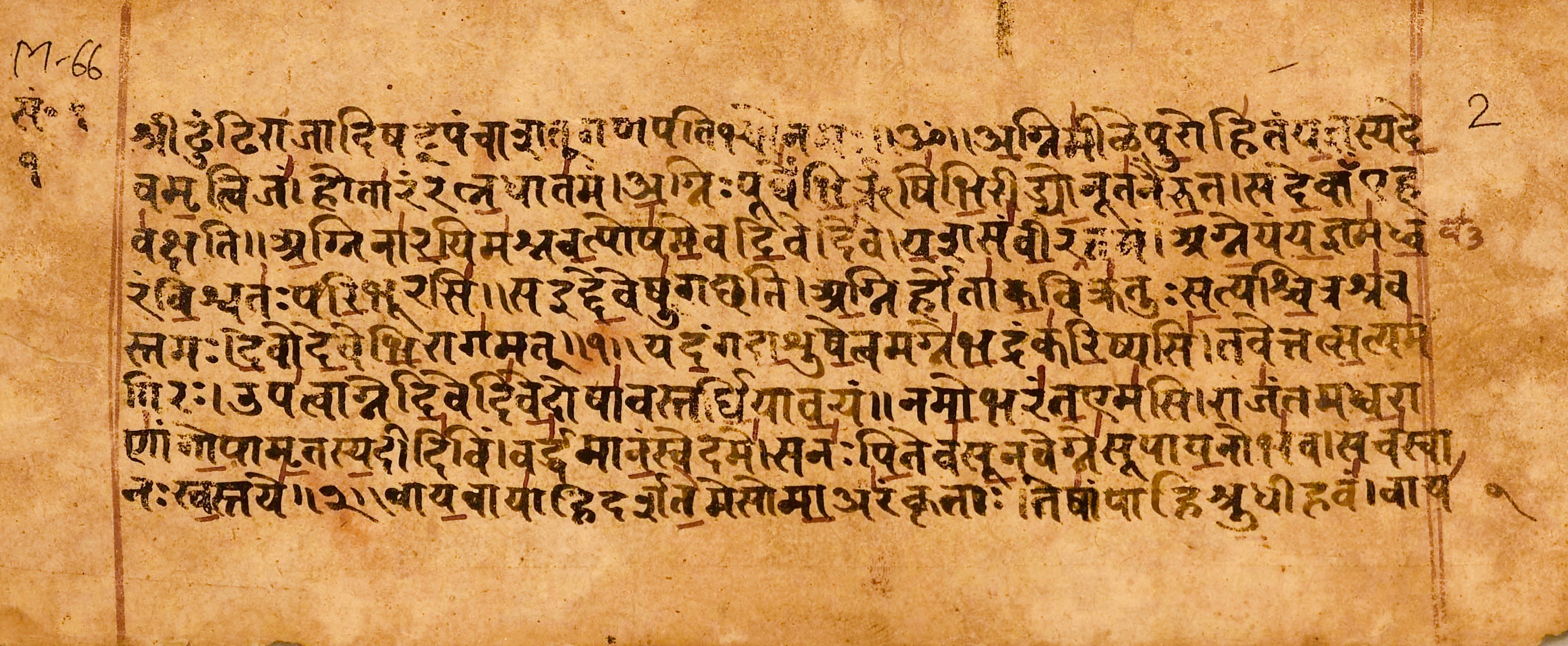
Rig Veda, the oldest known Hindu text, originated in the Punjab region.

The Punjab is predominantly Muslim though Hinduism is the oldest of the religions practised by Punjabi people, however, the term Hindu was also applied over a vast territory with much regional diversity. The historical Vedic religion constituted the religious ideas and practices in the Punjab during the Vedic period (1500–500 BCE), centered primarily in the worship of Indra. The bulk of the Rigveda was composed in the Punjab region between circa 1500 and 1200 BCE, while later Vedic scriptures were composed more eastwards, between the Yamuna and Ganges rivers. An ancient Indian law book called the Manusmriti, developed by Brahmin Hindu priests, shaped Punjabi religious life from 200 BCE onward.

Later, the spread of Buddhisim and Jainism in the Indian subcontinent saw the growth of Buddhism and Jainism in the Punjab. Islam was introduced via southern Punjab in the 8th century, becoming the majority by the 16th century, via local conversion. There was a small Jain community left in Punjab by the 16th century, while the Buddhist community had largely disappeared by the turn of the 10th century. The region became predominantly Muslim due to missionary Sufi saints whose dargahs dot the landscape of the Punjab region.

The rise of Sikhism in the 1700s saw some Punjabis, both Hindu and Muslim, accepting the new Sikh faith. A number of Punjabis during the colonial period of India became Christians, with all of these religions characterizing the religious diversity now found in the Punjab region.

==== Colonial era ====
A number of Punjabis during the colonial period of India became Christians, with all of these religions characterizing the religious diversity now found in the Punjab region. Additionally during the colonial era, the practice of religious syncretism among Punjabi Muslims and Punjabi Hindus was noted and documented by officials in census reports:

"In other parts of the Province, too, traces of Hindu festivals are noticeable among the Muhammadans. In the western Punjab, Baisakhi, the new year's day of the Hindus, is celebrated as an agricultural festival, by all Muhammadans, by racing bullocks yoked to the well gear, with the beat of tom-toms, and large crowds gather to witness the show, The race is called Baisakhi and is a favourite pastime in the well-irrigated tracts. Then the processions of tazias, in Muharram, with the accompaniment of tom-toms, fencing parties and bands playing on flutes and other musical instruments (which is disapproved by the orthodox Muhammadans) and the establishment of Sabils (shelters where water and sharbat are served out) are clearly influenced by similar practices at Hindu festivals, while the illuminations on occasions like the Chiraghan fair of Shalamar (Lahore) are no doubt practices answering to the holiday-making instinct of the converted Hindus."
"Besides actual conversion, Islam has had a considerable influence on the Hindu religion. The sects of reformers based on a revolt from the orthodoxy of Varnashrama Dharma were obviously the outcome of the knowledge that a different religion could produce equally pious and right thinking men. Laxity in social restrictions also appeared simultaneously in various degrees and certain customs were assimilated to those of the Muhammadans. On the other hand the miraculous powers of Muhammadan saints were enough to attract the saint worshiping Hindus, to allegiance, if not to a total change of faith... The Shamsis are believers in Shah Shamas Tabrez of Multan, and follow the Imam, for the time being, of the Ismailia sect of Shias... they belong mostly to the Sunar caste and their connection with the sect is kept a secret, like Freemasonry. They pass as ordinary Hindus, but their devotion to the Imam is very strong."

— Excerpts from the Census of India (Punjab Province), 1911

Population trends for major religious groups in the Punjab Province of the British India(1881–1941)
Religious group	Population % 1881 (Note: Including Delhi district, which was later made into a separate province in 1912, following the transfer from Calcutta to Delhi as capital of India in 1911.)	Population % 1891	Population % 1901	Population % 1911	Population % 1921	Population % 1931	Population % 1941
Islam	47.6%	47.8%	49.2%	50.8%	51.1%	52.4%	53.2%
Hinduism (Note: 1931 & 1941 censuses: Including Ad-Dharmis)	43.8%	43.6%	41.8%	36.3%	35.1%	31.7%	30.1%
Sikhism	8.2%	8.2%	8.5%	11.9%	12.4%	14.3%	14.9%
Christianity	0.1%	0.2%	0.3%	0.8%	1.3%	1.5%	1.5%
Other religions / No religion	0.2%	0.2%	0.2%	0.2%	0.2%	0.2%	0.2%

Religious groups in Punjab Province (1881–1941)
Religious group	1881		1901		1911		1921		1931		1941	
Religious group	Pop.	%	Pop.	%	Pop.	%	Pop.	%	Pop.	%	Pop.	%
Islam	9,872,745	47.58%	12,183,345	49.22%	12,275,477	50.75%	12,813,383	51.05%	14,929,896	52.4%	18,259,744	53.22%
Hinduism	9,095,175	43.84%	10,344,469	41.79%	8,773,621	36.27%	8,799,651	35.06%	9,018,509	31.65%	10,336,549	30.13%
Sikhism	1,706,165	8.22%	2,102,896	8.49%	2,883,729	11.92%	3,107,296	12.38%	4,071,624	14.29%	5,116,185	14.91%
Jainism	42,572	0.21%	49,983	0.2%	46,775	0.19%	41,321	0.16%	43,140	0.15%	45,475	0.13%
Christianity	28,054	0.14%	66,591	0.27%	199,751	0.83%	332,939	1.33%	419,353	1.47%	512,466	1.49%
Buddhism	3,251	0.02%	6,940	0.03%	7,690	0.03%	5,912	0.02%	7,753	0.03%	854	0.002%
Zoroastrianism	413	0.002%	477	0.002%	653	0.003%	526	0.002%	569	0.002%	4,359	0.01%
Judaism	—N/a	—N/a	24	0.0001%	54	0.0002%	19	0.0001%	13	0%	39	0.0001%
Others	57	0.0003%	12	0%	0	0%	13	0.0001%	0	0%	34,190	0.1%
Total population	20,748,432	100%	24,754,737	100%	24,187,750	100%	25,101,060	100%	28,490,857	100%	34,309,861	100%

Religion in West Punjab (1881–1941)
Religious group	1881 (Note: 1881 figure taken from census data by combining the total population of all districts (Lahore, Sialkot, Gujranwala, Gujrat, Shahpur, Jhelum, Rawalpindi, Montgomery, Jhang, Multan, Muzaffargargh, Dera Ghazi Khan), one tehsil (Shakargarh – then part of Gurdaspur District), and one princely state (Bahawalpur) in Punjab Province, British India that ultimately fell on the western side of the Radcliffe Line. See 1881 census data here: Immediately following the partition of India in 1947, these districts and tract would ultimately make up the subdivision of West Punjab, which also later included Bahawalpur. The state that makes up this region in the contemporary era is Punjab, Pakistan.)		1901 (Note: 1901 figure taken from census data by combining the total population of all districts (Lahore, Sialkot, Gujranwala, Gujrat, Shahpur, Jhelum, Rawalpindi, Mianwali, Montgomery, Lyallpur (inscribed as the Chenab Colony on the 1901 census), Jhang, Multan, Muzaffargargh, Dera Ghazi Khan), one tehsil (Shakargarh – then part of Gurdaspur District), one princely state (Bahawalpur), and one tract (Biloch Trans–Frontier) in Punjab Province, British India that ultimately fell on the western side of the Radcliffe Line. See 1901 census data here: Immediately following the partition of India in 1947, these districts and tract would ultimately make up the subdivision of West Punjab, which also later included Bahawalpur. The state that makes up this region in the contemporary era is Punjab, Pakistan.)		1911 (Note: 1911 figure taken from census data by combining the total population of all districts (Lahore, Sialkot, Gujranwala, Gujrat, Shahpur, Jhelum, Rawalpindi, Attock, Mianwali, Montgomery, Lyallpur, Jhang, Multan, Muzaffargargh, Dera Ghazi Khan), one tehsil (Shakargarh – then part of Gurdaspur District), one princely state (Bahawalpur), and one tract (Biloch Trans–Frontier) in Punjab Province, British India that ultimately fell on the western side of the Radcliffe Line. See 1911 census data here: Immediately following the partition of India in 1947, these districts and tract would ultimately make up the subdivision of West Punjab, which also later included Bahawalpur. The state that makes up this region in the contemporary era is Punjab, Pakistan.)		1921 (Note: 1921 figure taken from census data by combining the total population of all districts (Lahore, Sialkot, Gujranwala, Sheikhupura, Gujrat, Shahpur, Jhelum, Rawalpindi, Attock, Mianwali, Montgomery, Lyallpur, Jhang, Multan, Muzaffargargh, Dera Ghazi Khan), one tehsil (Shakargarh – then part of Gurdaspur District), one princely state (Bahawalpur), and one tract (Biloch Trans–Frontier) in Punjab Province, British India that ultimately fell on the western side of the Radcliffe Line. See 1921 census data here: Immediately following the partition of India in 1947, these districts and tract would ultimately make up the subdivision of West Punjab, which also later included Bahawalpur. The state that makes up this region in the contemporary era is Punjab, Pakistan.)		1931 (Note: 1931 figure taken from census data by combining the total population of all districts (Lahore, Sialkot, Gujranwala, Sheikhupura, Gujrat, Shahpur, Jhelum, Rawalpindi, Attock, Mianwali, Montgomery, Lyallpur, Jhang, Multan, Muzaffargargh, Dera Ghazi Khan), one tehsil (Shakargarh – then part of Gurdaspur District), one princely state (Bahawalpur), and one tract (Biloch Trans–Frontier) in Punjab Province, British India that ultimately fell on the western side of the Radcliffe Line. See 1931 census data here: Immediately following the partition of India in 1947, these districts and tract would ultimately make up the subdivision of West Punjab, which also later included Bahawalpur. The state that makes up this region in the contemporary era is Punjab, Pakistan.)		1941 (Note: 1941 figure taken from census data by combining the total population of all districts (Lahore, Sialkot, Gujranwala, Sheikhupura, Gujrat, Shahpur, Jhelum, Rawalpindi, Attock, Mianwali, Montgomery, Lyallpur, Jhang, Multan, Muzaffargargh, Dera Ghazi Khan), one tehsil (Shakargarh – then part of Gurdaspur District), one princely state (Bahawalpur), and one tract (Biloch Trans–Frontier) in Punjab Province, British India that ultimately fell on the western side of the Radcliffe Line. See 1941 census data here: Immediately following the partition of India in 1947, these districts and tract would ultimately make up the subdivision of West Punjab, which also later included Bahawalpur. The state that makes up this region in the contemporary era is Punjab, Pakistan.)	
Religious group	Pop.	%	Pop.	%	Pop.	%	Pop.	%	Pop.	%	Pop.	%
Islam	6,201,859	78.09%	7,951,155	76.25%	8,494,314	76.49%	8,975,288	75.49%	10,570,029	75.28%	13,022,160	75.1%
Hinduism	1,449,913	18.26%	1,944,363	18.65%	1,645,758	14.82%	1,797,141	15.12%	1,957,878	13.94%	2,373,466	13.69%
Sikhism	272,908	3.44%	483,999	4.64%	813,441	7.33%	863,091	7.26%	1,180,789	8.41%	1,520,112	8.77%
Christianity	12,992	0.16%	42,371	0.41%	144,514	1.3%	247,030	2.08%	324,730	2.31%	395,311	2.28%
Jainism	4,352	0.05%	5,562	0.05%	5,977	0.05%	5,930	0.05%	6,921	0.05%	9,520	0.05%
Zoroastrianism	354	0.004%	300	0.003%	377	0.003%	309	0.003%	413	0.003%	312	0.002%
Buddhism	0	0%	6	0.0001%	168	0.002%	172	0.001%	32	0.0002%	87	0.001%
Judaism	—N/a	—N/a	9	0.0001%	36	0.0003%	16	0.0001%	6	0%	7	0%
Others	21	0.0003%	0	0%	0	0%	8	0.0001%	0	0%	19,128	0.11%
Total Population	7,942,399	100%	10,427,765	100%	11,104,585	100%	11,888,985	100%	14,040,798	100%	17,340,103	100%
Territory comprises the contemporary subdivisions of Punjab, Pakistan and Islamabad Capital Territory.

Religion in East Punjab (1881–1941)
Religious group	1881 (Note: 1881 figure taken from census data by combining the total population of all districts (Hisar, Rohtak, Gurgaon, Delhi, Karnal, Sirsa, Jalandhar, Ludhiana, Firozpur, Amritsar, Simla, Kangra, Ambala, Hoshiarpur, and Gurdaspur (minus Shakargarh Tehsil)), and princely states (Loharu, Dujana, Pataudi, Kalsia, Kapurthala, Malerkotla, Faridkot, Patiala, Jind, Nabha, and Simla Hill) in Punjab Province, British India that ultimately fell on the eastern side of the Radcliffe Line. See 1881 census data here: Immediately following the partition of India in 1947, these districts and princely states would ultimately make up the subdivision of East Punjab, which also included Patiala and East Punjab States Union, Chief Commissioner's Province of Himachal Pradesh, and Bilaspur State. The states that make up this region in the contemporary era are Punjab, India, Chandigarh, Haryana, and Himachal Pradesh.)		1901 (Note: 1901 figure taken from census data by combining the total population of all districts (Hisar, Rohtak, Gurgaon, Delhi, Karnal, Jalandhar, Ludhiana, Firozpur, Amritsar, Simla, Kangra, Ambala, Hoshiarpur, and Gurdaspur (minus Shakargarh Tehsil)), and princely states (Loharu, Dujana, Pataudi, Kalsia, Kapurthala, Malerkotla, Faridkot, Patiala, Jind, Nabha, Nahan, Simla Hill, Mandi, Suket, and Chamba) in Punjab Province, British India that ultimately fell on the eastern side of the Radcliffe Line. See 1901 census data here: Immediately following the partition of India in 1947, these districts and princely states would ultimately make up the subdivision of East Punjab, which also included Patiala and East Punjab States Union, Chief Commissioner's Province of Himachal Pradesh, and Bilaspur State. The states that make up this region in the contemporary era are Punjab, India, Chandigarh, Haryana, and Himachal Pradesh.)		1911 (Note: 1911 figure taken from census data by combining the total population of all districts (Hisar, Rohtak, Gurgaon, Delhi, Karnal, Jalandhar, Ludhiana, Firozpur, Amritsar, Simla, Kangra, Ambala, Hoshiarpur, and Gurdaspur (minus Shakargarh Tehsil)), and princely states (Loharu, Dujana, Pataudi, Kalsia, Kapurthala, Malerkotla, Faridkot, Patiala, Jind, Nabha, Nahan, Simla Hill, Mandi, Suket, and Chamba) in Punjab Province, British India that ultimately fell on the eastern side of the Radcliffe Line. See 1911 census data here: Immediately following the partition of India in 1947, these districts and princely states would ultimately make up the subdivision of East Punjab, which also included Patiala and East Punjab States Union, Chief Commissioner's Province of Himachal Pradesh, and Bilaspur State. The states that make up this region in the contemporary era are Punjab, India, Chandigarh, Haryana, and Himachal Pradesh.)		1921 (Note: 1921 figure taken from census data by combining the total population of all districts (Hisar, Rohtak, Gurgaon, Karnal, Jalandhar, Ludhiana, Firozpur, Amritsar, Simla, Kangra, Ambala, Hoshiarpur, and Gurdaspur (minus Shakargarh Tehsil)), and princely states (Loharu, Dujana, Pataudi, Kalsia, Kapurthala, Malerkotla, Faridkot, Patiala, Jind, Nabha, Nahan, Simla Hill, Bilaspur, Mandi, Suket, and Chamba) in Punjab Province, British India that ultimately fell on the eastern side of the Radcliffe Line. See 1921 census data here: Immediately following the partition of India in 1947, these districts and princely states would ultimately make up the subdivision of East Punjab, which also included Patiala and East Punjab States Union, Chief Commissioner's Province of Himachal Pradesh, and Bilaspur State. The states that make up this region in the contemporary era are Punjab, India, Chandigarh, Haryana, and Himachal Pradesh.)		1931 (Note: 1931 figure taken from census data by combining the total population of all districts (Hisar, Rohtak, Gurgaon, Karnal, Jalandhar, Ludhiana, Firozpur, Amritsar, Simla, Kangra, Ambala, Hoshiarpur, and Gurdaspur (minus Shakargarh Tehsil)), and princely states (Loharu, Dujana, Pataudi, Kalsia, Kapurthala, Malerkotla, Faridkot, Patiala, Jind, Nabha, Sirmoor, Simla Hill, Bilaspur, Mandi, Suket, and Chamba) in Punjab Province, British India that ultimately fell on the eastern side of the Radcliffe Line. See 1931 census data here: Immediately following the partition of India in 1947, these districts and princely states would ultimately make up the subdivision of East Punjab, which also included Patiala and East Punjab States Union, Chief Commissioner's Province of Himachal Pradesh, and Bilaspur State. The states that make up this region in the contemporary era are Punjab, India, Chandigarh, Haryana, and Himachal Pradesh.)		1941 (Note: 1941 figure taken from census data by combining the total population of all districts (Hisar, Rohtak, Gurgaon, Karnal, Jalandhar, Ludhiana, Firozpur, Amritsar, Simla, Kangra, Ambala, Hoshiarpur, and Gurdaspur (minus Shakargarh Tehsil)), and princely states (Loharu, Dujana, Pataudi, Kalsia, Kapurthala, Malerkotla, Faridkot, Patiala, Jind, Nabha, Sirmoor, Simla Hill, Bilaspur, Mandi, Suket, and Chamba) in Punjab Province, British India that ultimately fell on the eastern side of the Radcliffe Line. See 1941 census data here: Immediately following the partition of India in 1947, these districts and princely states would ultimately make up the subdivision of East Punjab, which also included Patiala and East Punjab States Union, Chief Commissioner's Province of Himachal Pradesh, and Bilaspur State. The states that make up this region in the contemporary era are Punjab, India, Chandigarh, Haryana, and Himachal Pradesh.)	
Religious group	Pop.	%	Pop.	%	Pop.	%	Pop.	%	Pop.	%	Pop.	%
Hinduism	7,645,262	59.7%	8,400,106	58.63%	7,127,863	54.48%	7,002,510	53%	7,060,631	48.86%	7,963,083	46.93%
Islam	3,670,886	28.67%	4,232,190	29.54%	3,781,163	28.9%	3,838,095	29.05%	4,359,867	30.17%	5,237,584	30.86%
Sikhism	1,433,257	11.19%	1,618,897	11.3%	2,070,288	15.82%	2,244,205	16.99%	2,890,835	20.01%	3,596,073	21.19%
Jainism	38,220	0.3%	44,421	0.31%	40,798	0.31%	35,391	0.27%	36,219	0.25%	35,955	0.21%
Christianity	15,062	0.12%	24,220	0.17%	55,237	0.42%	85,909	0.65%	94,623	0.65%	117,155	0.69%
Buddhism	3,251	0.03%	6,934	0.05%	7,522	0.06%	5,740	0.04%	7,721	0.05%	767	0.005%
Zoroastrianism	59	0.0005%	177	0.001%	276	0.002%	217	0.002%	156	0.001%	4,047	0.02%
Judaism	—N/a	—N/a	15	0.0001%	18	0.0001%	3	0%	7	0%	32	0.0002%
Others	36	0.0003%	12	0.0001%	0	0%	5	0%	0	0%	15,062	0.09%
Total Population	12,806,033	100%	14,326,972	100%	13,083,165	100%	13,212,075	100%	14,450,059	100%	16,969,758	100%
Territory comprises the contemporary subdivisions of Punjab, India, Chandigarh, Haryana, and Himachal Pradesh.

Religious groups in the Indo—Gangetic Plain West geographical division of Punjab Province (1881–1941)
Religious group	1881		1901		1911		1921		1931		1941	
Religious group	Pop.	%	Pop.	%	Pop.	%	Pop.	%	Pop.	%	Pop.	%
Hinduism	4,975,901	48.94%	5,825,964	48.64%	4,790,624	43.44%	4,735,960	41.37%	4,709,545	36.59%	5,314,610	34.43%
Islam	3,751,891	36.9%	4,481,366	37.42%	4,144,971	37.59%	4,350,186	38%	5,112,215	39.72%	6,247,791	40.48%
Sikhism	1,390,873	13.68%	1,605,457	13.4%	1,993,750	18.08%	2,186,429	19.1%	2,816,785	21.88%	3,576,659	23.17%
Jainism	36,479	0.36%	41,877	0.35%	39,111	0.35%	33,515	0.29%	34,806	0.27%	34,744	0.23%
Christianity	11,729	0.12%	22,103	0.18%	58,462	0.53%	140,104	1.22%	198,081	1.54%	247,028	1.6%
Zoroastrianism	139	0%	299	0%	412	0%	318	0%	314	0%	235	0%
Buddhism	1	0%	3	0%	132	0%	184	0%	23	0%	39	0%
Judaism	—N/a	—N/a	19	0%	28	0%	14	0%	5	0%	30	0%
Others	49	0%	12	0%	0	0%	6	0%	0	0%	14,844	0.1%
Total population (Note: See total breakdowns in tables on Religion in the Punjab page.)	10,167,062	100%	11,977,100	100%	11,027,490	100%	11,446,716	100%	12,871,774	100%	15,435,980	100%

The Indo−Gangetic Plain West geographical division included Hisar district, Loharu State, Rohtak district, Dujana State, Gurgaon district, Pataudi State, Delhi, Karnal district, Jalandhar district, Kapurthala State, Ludhiana district, Malerkotla State, Firozpur district, Faridkot State, Patiala State, Jind State, Nabha State, Lahore District, Amritsar district, Gujranwala District, and Sheikhupura District.

Religious groups in the Himalayan geographical division of Punjab Province (1881–1941)
Religious group	1881		1901		1911		1921		1931		1941	
Religious group	Pop.	%	Pop.	%	Pop.	%	Pop.	%	Pop.	%	Pop.	%
Hinduism	1,458,481	94.74%	1,598,853	94.6%	1,630,084	94.53%	1,642,176	94.5%	1,729,008	94.42%	1,929,634	94.76%
Islam	70,642	4.59%	76,480	4.53%	74,205	4.3%	77,425	4.46%	82,711	4.52%	87,485	4.3%
Christianity	3,840	0.25%	3,415	0.2%	4,400	0.26%	4,471	0.26%	2,586	0.14%	2,129	0.1%
Buddhism	3,250	0.21%	6,931	0.41%	7,518	0.44%	5,718	0.33%	7,705	0.42%	614	0.03%
Sikhism	2,680	0.17%	3,897	0.23%	7,894	0.46%	7,610	0.44%	8,948	0.49%	12,245	0.6%
Jainism	536	0.03%	483	0.03%	358	0.02%	356	0.02%	291	0.02%	425	0.02%
Zoroastrianism	4	0%	7	0%	18	0%	40	0%	3	0%	3,895	0.19%
Judaism	—N/a	—N/a	0	0%	3	0%	1	0%	1	0%	0	0%
Others	0	0%	0	0%	0	0%	4	0%	0	0%	1	0%
Total population	1,539,433	100%	1,690,066	100%	1,724,480	100%	1,737,801	100%	1,831,253	100%	2,036,428	100%

The Himalayan geographical division included Sirmoor State, Simla District, Simla Hill States, Bilaspur State, Kangra district, Mandi State, Suket State, and Chamba State.

Religious groups in the Sub—Himalayan geographical division of Punjab Province (1881–1941)
Religious group	1881		1901		1911		1921		1931		1941	
Religious group	Pop.	%	Pop.	%	Pop.	%	Pop.	%	Pop.	%	Pop.	%
Islam	3,511,174	58.8%	3,741,759	60.62%	3,551,989	61.19%	3,587,246	61.44%	4,009,166	61.99%	4,751,911	62.32%
Hinduism	2,159,634	36.17%	2,042,505	33.09%	1,588,097	27.36%	1,556,703	26.66%	1,565,034	24.2%	1,799,915	23.6%
Sikhism	284,592	4.77%	350,587	5.68%	565,596	9.74%	570,759	9.78%	753,168	11.65%	906,802	11.89%
Christianity	10,363	0.17%	29,930	0.48%	92,524	1.59%	117,172	2.01%	132,500	2.05%	155,386	2.04%
Jainism	5,231	0.09%	7,278	0.12%	6,695	0.12%	6,866	0.12%	7,299	0.11%	9,172	0.12%
Zoroastrianism	200	0%	117	0%	152	0%	111	0%	76	0%	141	0%
Buddhism	0	0%	6	0%	11	0%	8	0%	22	0%	171	0%
Judaism	—N/a	—N/a	5	0%	17	0%	1	0%	7	0%	6	0%
Others	1	0%	0	0%	0	0%	3	0%	0	0%	1,681	0.02%
Total population	5,971,195	100%	6,172,187	100%	5,805,081	100%	5,838,869	100%	6,467,272	100%	7,625,185	100%

The Sub−Himalayan geographical division included Ambala district, Kalsia State, Hoshiarpur district, Gurdaspur district, Sialkot District, Gujrat District, Jhelum District, Rawalpindi District, and Attock District.

Religious groups in the North—West Dry Area geographical division of Punjab Province (1881–1941)
Religious group	1881		1901		1911		1921		1931		1941	
Religious group	Pop.	%	Pop.	%	Pop.	%	Pop.	%	Pop.	%	Pop.	%
Islam	2,539,038	82.68%	3,883,740	79.01%	4,504,312	80%	4,798,526	78.95%	5,725,804	78.22%	7,172,557	77.86%
Hinduism	501,159	16.32%	877,147	17.84%	764,816	13.58%	864,812	14.23%	1,014,922	13.86%	1,292,390	14.03%
Sikhism	28,020	0.91%	142,955	2.91%	316,489	5.62%	342,498	5.64%	492,723	6.73%	620,479	6.74%
Christianity	2,122	0.07%	11,143	0.23%	44,365	0.79%	71,192	1.17%	86,186	1.18%	107,923	1.17%
Jainism	326	0.01%	345	0.01%	611	0.01%	584	0.01%	744	0.01%	1,134	0.01%
Zoroastrianism	70	0%	54	0%	71	0%	57	0%	176	0%	88	0%
Buddhism	0	0%	0	0%	29	0%	2	0%	3	0%	30	0%
Judaism	—N/a	—N/a	0	0%	6	0%	3	0%	0	0%	3	0%
Others	7	0%	0	0%	0	0%	0	0%	0	0%	17,664	0.19%
Total population	3,070,742	100%	4,915,384	100%	5,630,699	100%	6,077,674	100%	7,320,558	100%	9,212,268	100%

The North−West Dry Area geographical division included Montgomery District, Shahpur District, Mianwali District, Lyallpur District, Jhang District, Multan District, Bahawalpur State, Muzaffargarh District, Dera Ghazi Khan District, and the Biloch Trans–Frontier Tract.

==== Post-partition ====
In the present-day, the vast majority of Pakistani Punjabis are Sunni Muslim by faith, but also include significant minority faiths, such as Shia Muslims, Ahmadi Muslims, Hindus, Sikhs and Christians.

Sikhism, founded by Guru Nanak is the main religion practised in the post-1966 Indian Punjab state. About 57.7% of the population of Punjab state is Sikh, 38.5% is Hindu, with the remaining population including Muslims, Christians, and Jains. Punjab state contains the holy Sikh cities of Amritsar, Anandpur Sahib, Tarn Taran Sahib, Fatehgarh Sahib and Chamkaur Sahib.

The Punjab was home to several Sufi saints, and Sufism is well established in the region. Also, Kirpal Singh revered the Sikh Gurus as saints.

Religious groups in the Punjab Region (2011 Census of India & 2017 Census of Pakistan)
Religious group	Punjab Region		Punjab (Pakistan)		Punjab (India)		Haryana		Delhi		Himachal Pradesh		Islamabad		Chandigarh	
Religious group	Total population	Percentage	Pop.	%	Pop.	%	Pop.	%	Pop.	%	Pop.	%	Pop.	%	Pop.	%
Islam	114,130,322	60.13%	107,541,602	97.77%	535,489	1.93%	1,781,342	7.03%	2,158,684	12.86%	149,881	2.18%	1,911,877	95.43%	51,447	4.87%
Hinduism	54,159,083	28.54%	211,641	0.19%	10,678,138	38.49%	22,171,128	87.46%	13,712,100	81.68%	6,532,765	95.17%	737	0.04%	852,574	80.78%
Sikhism	18,037,312	9.5%	—N/a	—N/a	16,004,754	57.69%	1,243,752	4.91%	570,581	3.4%	79,896	1.16%	—N/a	—N/a	138,329	13.11%
Christianity	2,715,952	1.43%	2,063,063	1.88%	348,230	1.26%	50,353	0.2%	146,093	0.87%	12,646	0.18%	86,847	4.34%	8,720	0.83%
Jainism	267,649	0.14%	—N/a	—N/a	45,040	0.16%	52,613	0.21%	166,231	0.99%	1,805	0.03%	—N/a	—N/a	1,960	0.19%
Ahmadiyya	160,759	0.08%	158,021	0.14%	—N/a	—N/a	—N/a	—N/a	—N/a	—N/a	—N/a	—N/a	2,738	0.14%	—N/a	—N/a
Buddhism	139,019	0.07%	—N/a	—N/a	33,237	0.12%	7,514	0.03%	18,449	0.11%	78,659	1.15%	—N/a	—N/a	1,160	0.11%
Others	185,720	0.1%	15,328	0.01%	98,450	0.35%	44,760	0.18%	15,803	0.09%	8,950	0.13%	1,169	0.06%	1,260	0.12%
Total population	189,795,816	100%	109,989,655	100%	27,743,338	100%	25,351,462	100%	16,787,941	100%	6,864,602	100%	2,003,368	100%	1,055,450	100%

=== Tribes ===
Ethnographic photographs from Punjab region (mid-19th century).

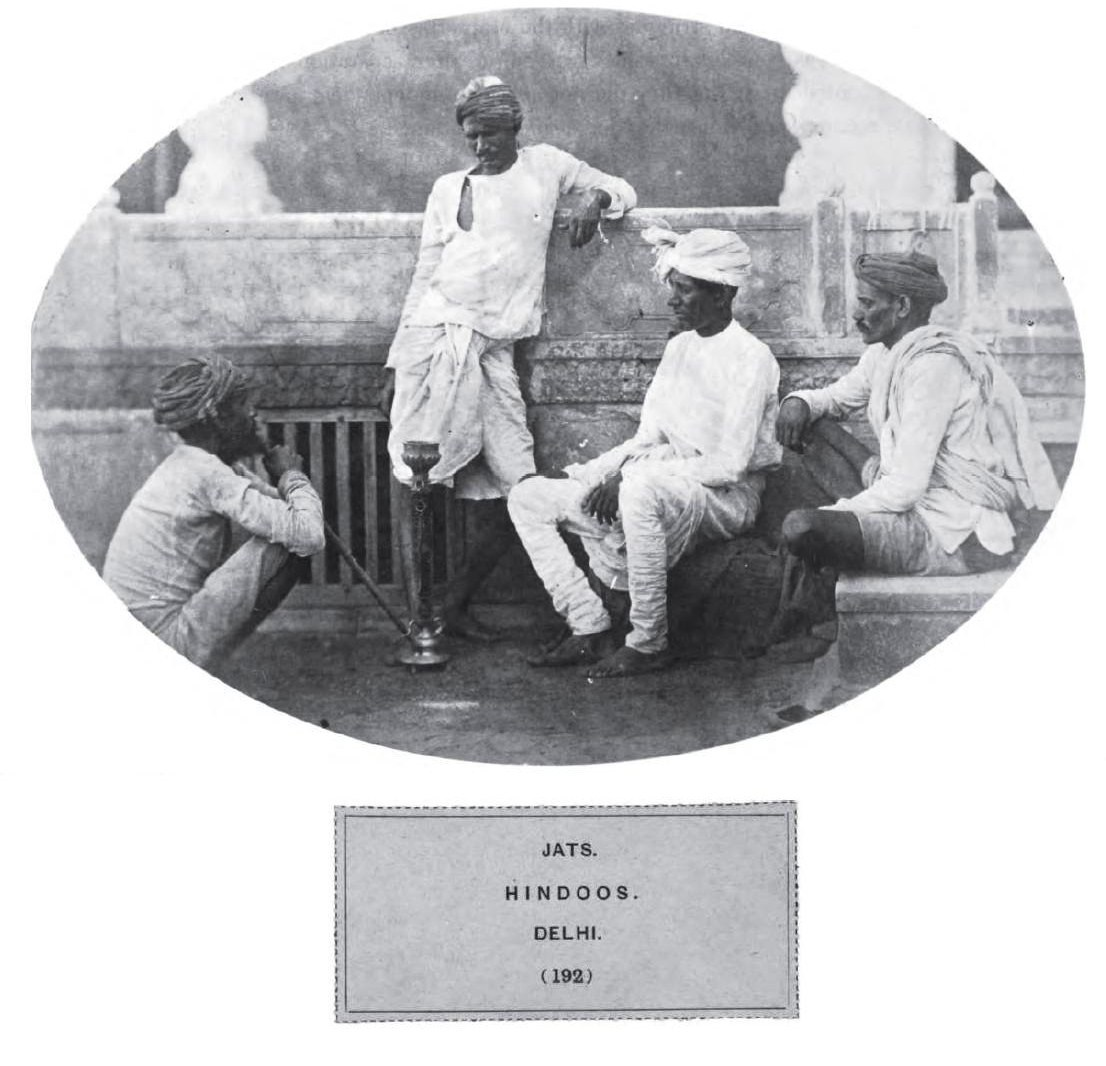
Jats in Delhi (1868)

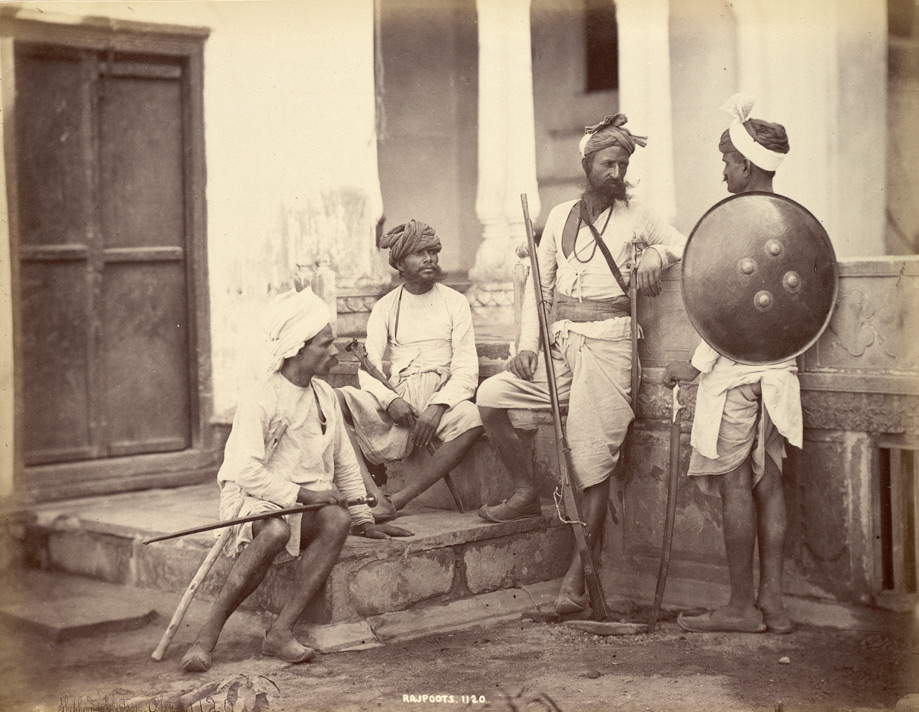
Rajputs in Delhi (1868)

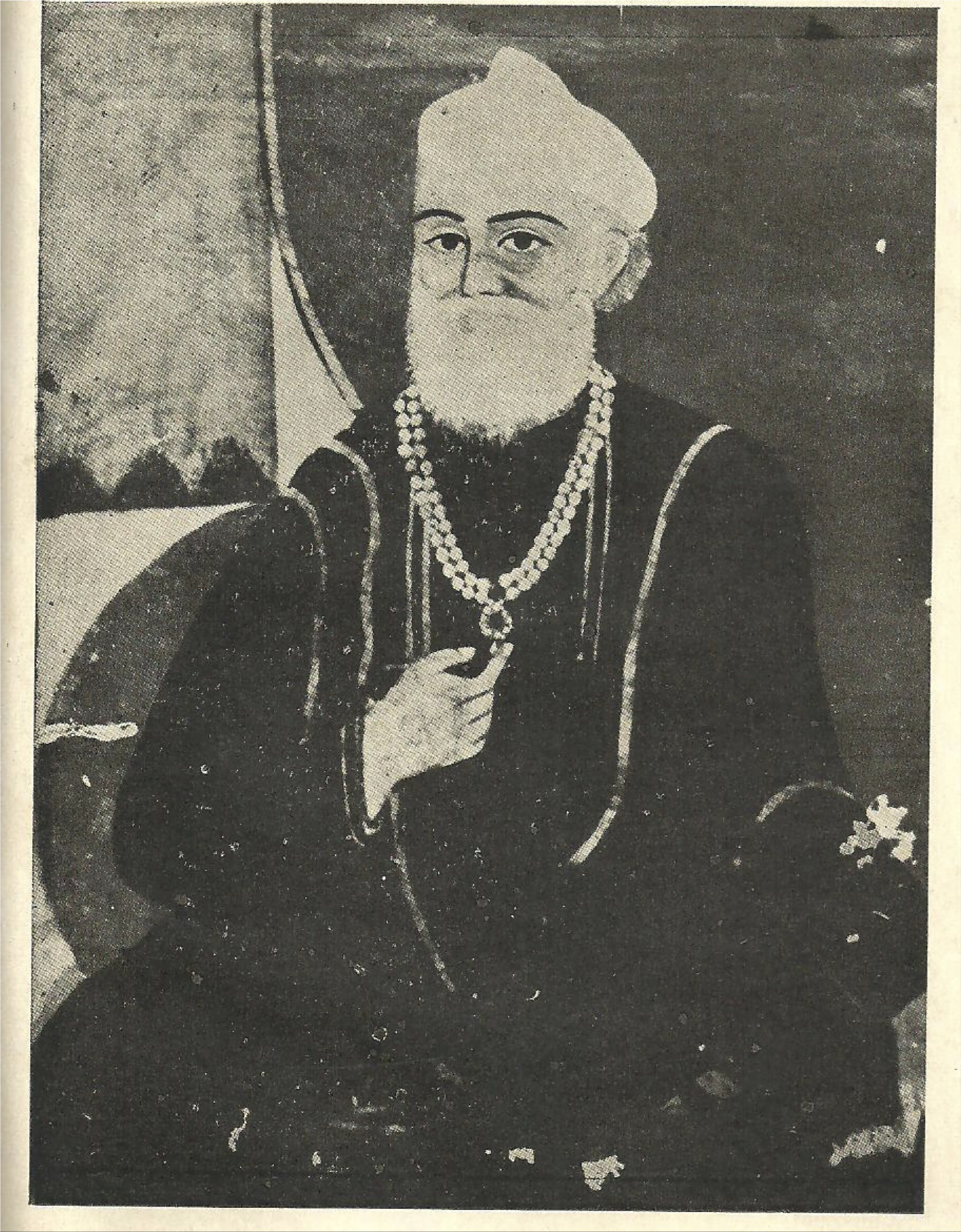
Brahmin in Lahore (c. 1799–1849)

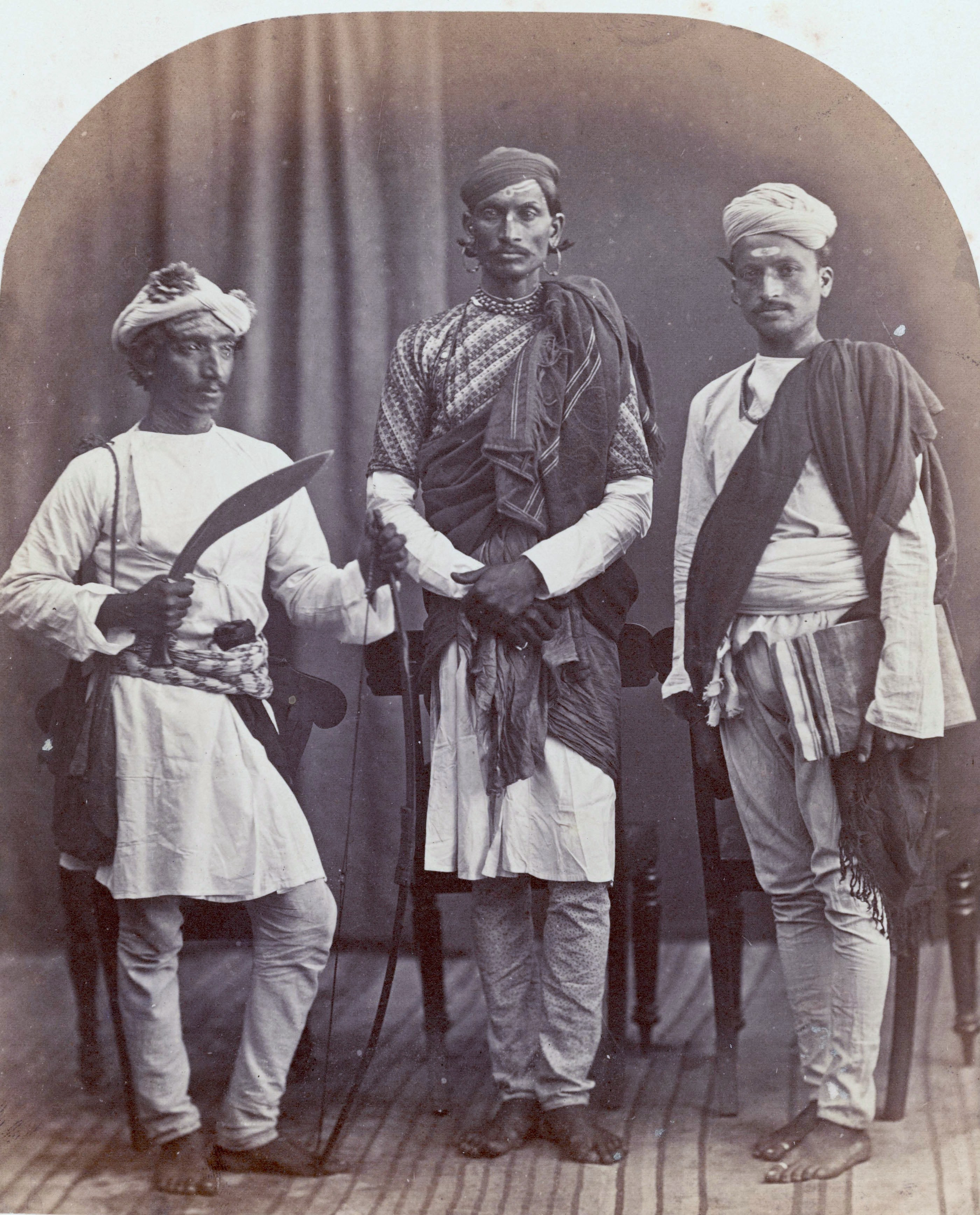
Left to right: Gurkha, Brahmin, and Shudra (Chuhra-Chamar) in Shimla (1868)

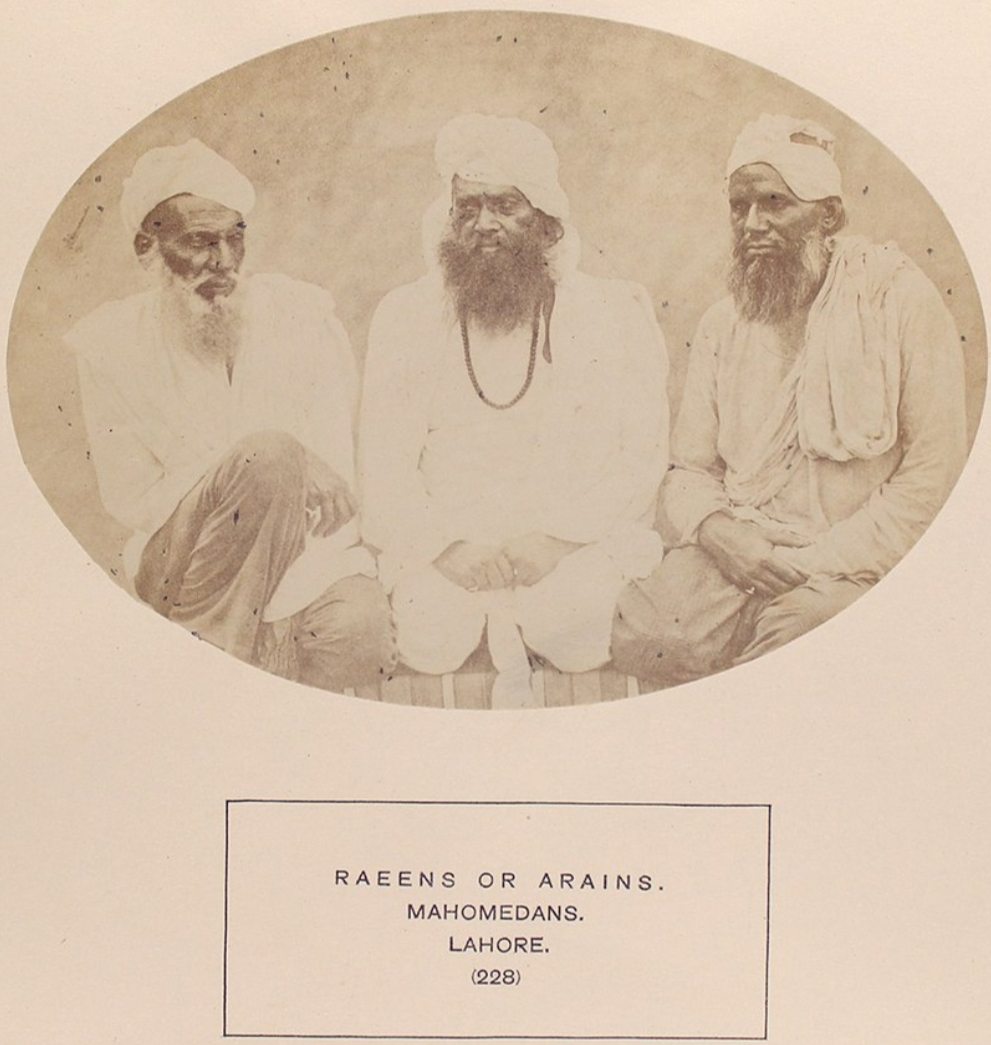
Arains in Lahore (1868)

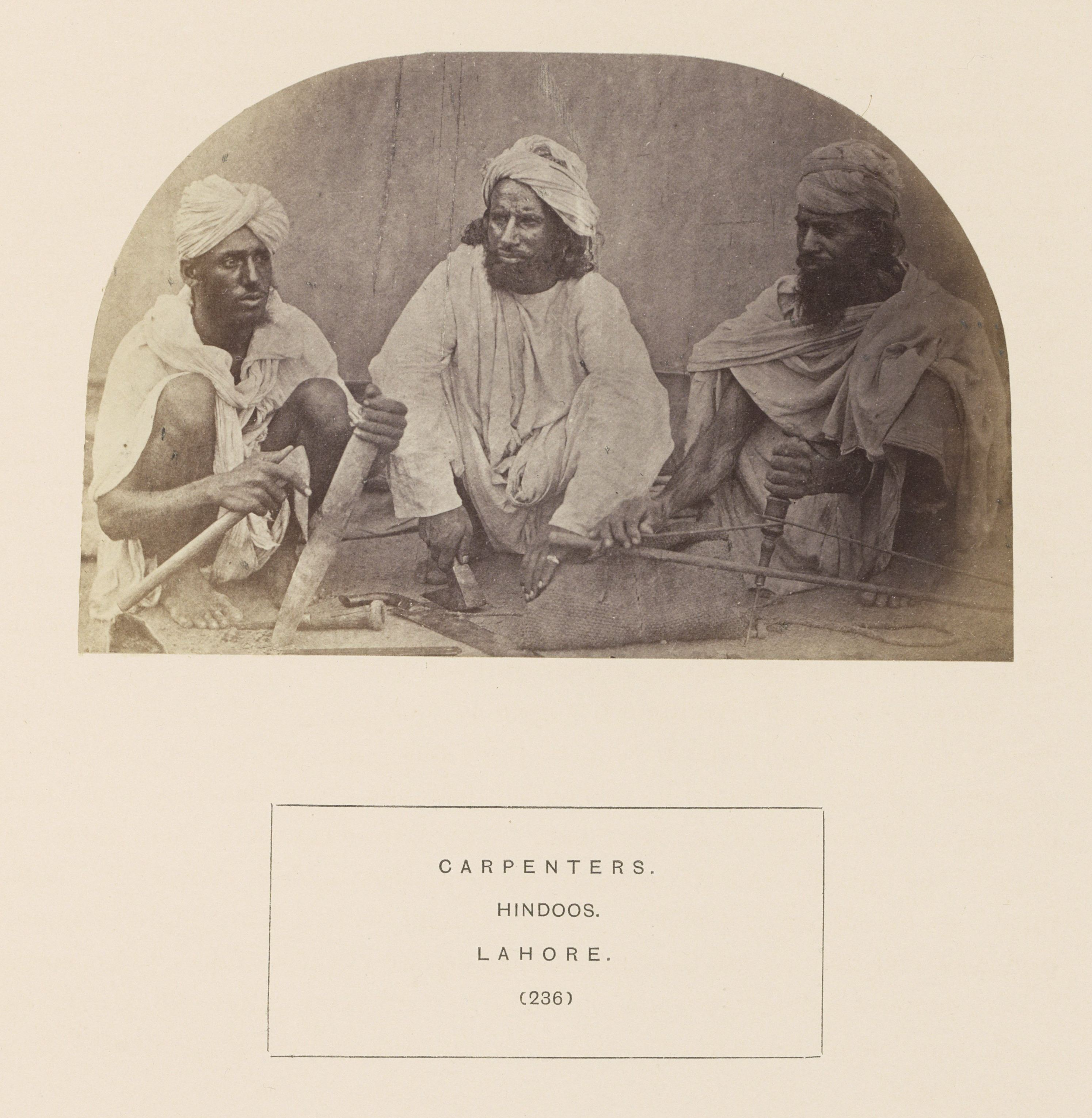
Tarkhans in Lahore (c. 1862–1872)

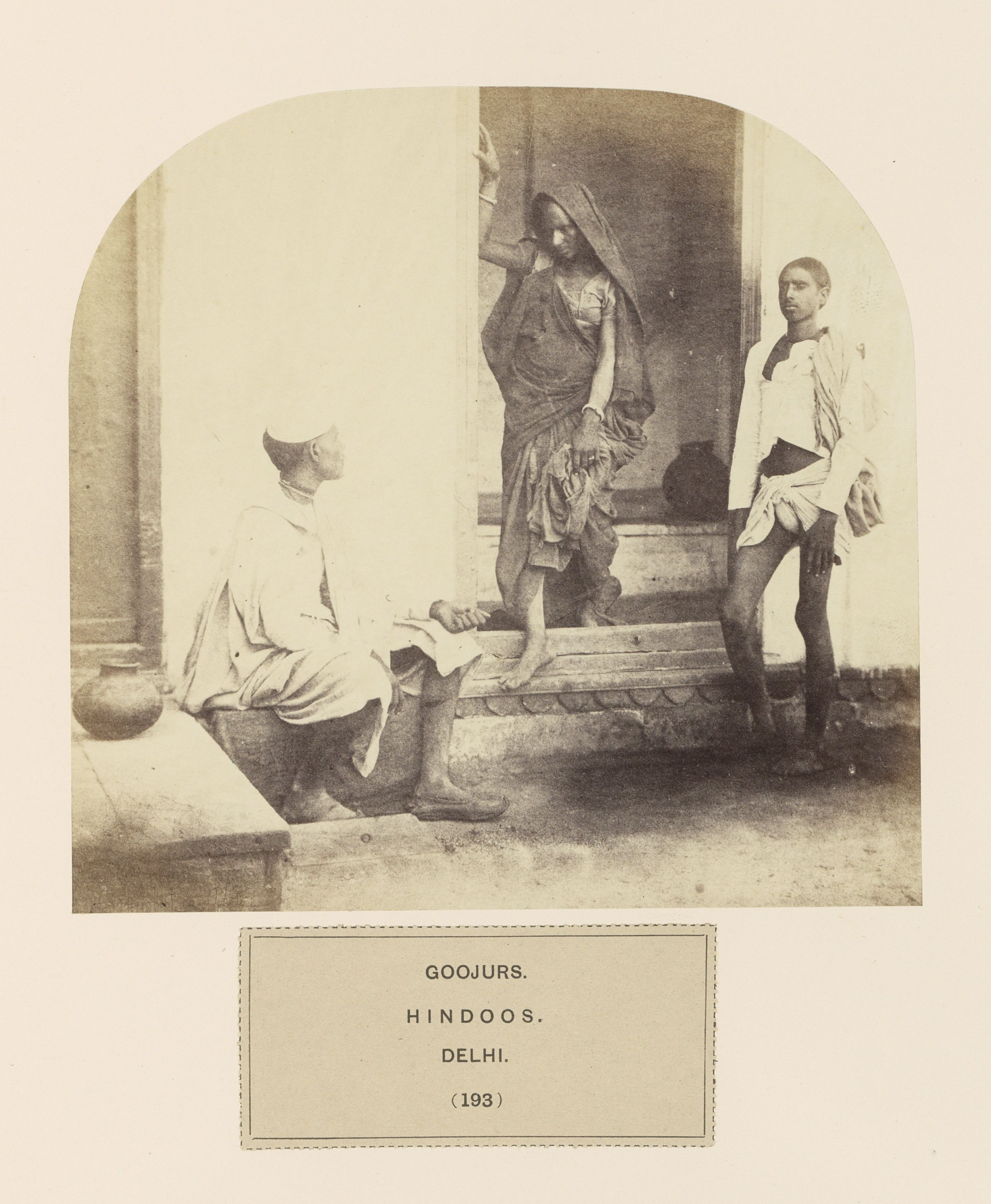
Gujjars in Delhi (c. 1859–1869)

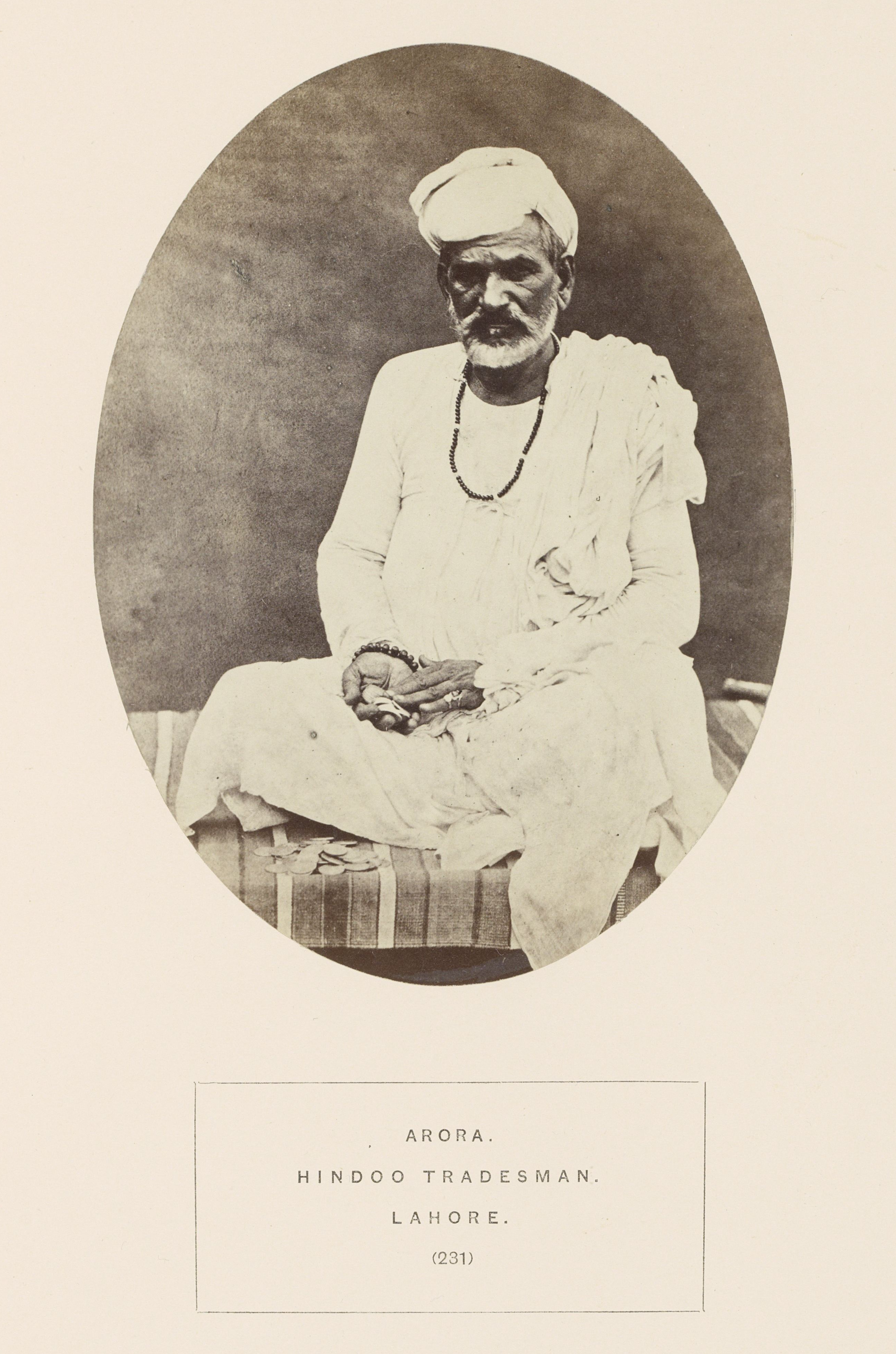
Arora in Lahore (c. 1862–1872)

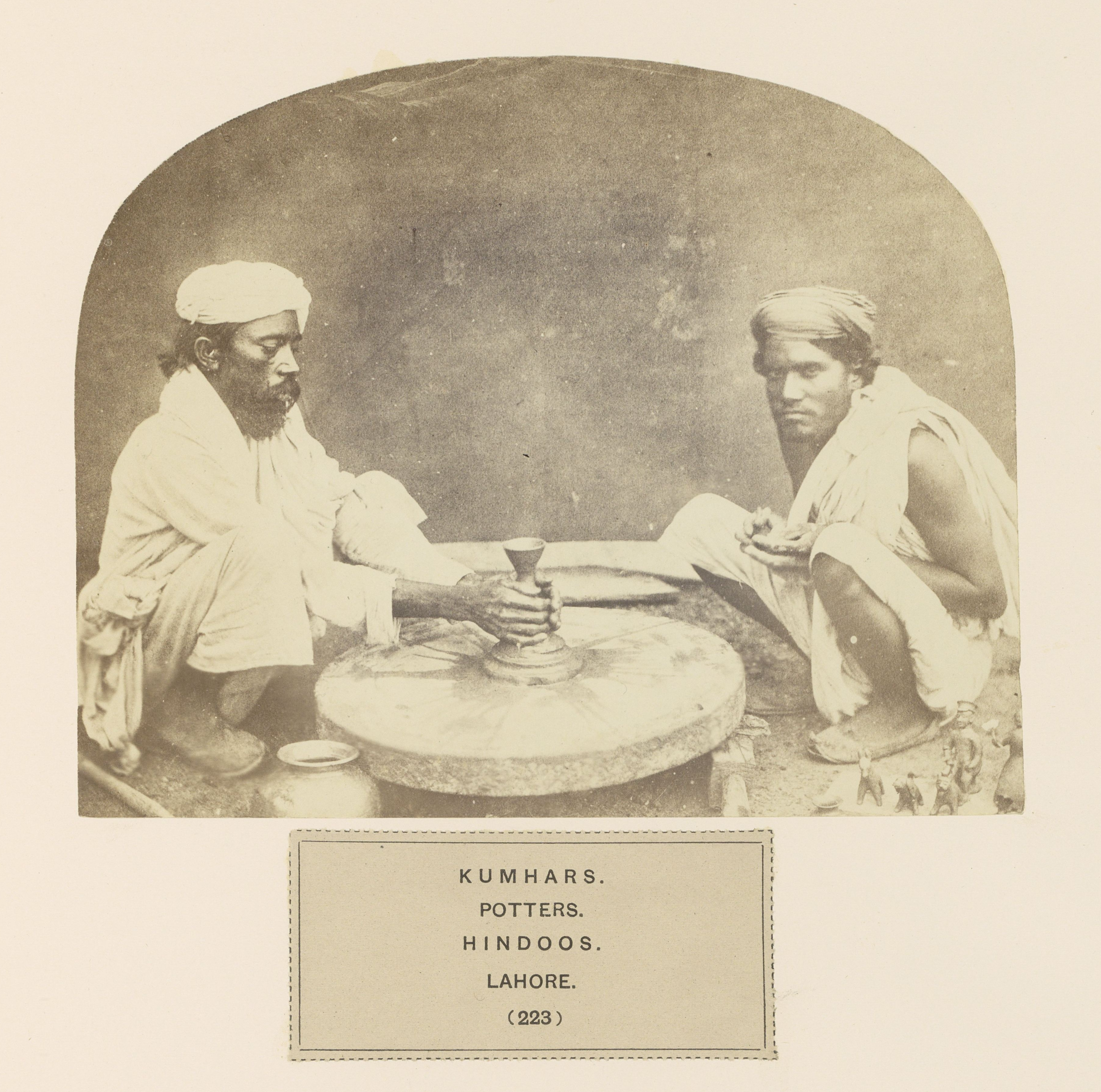
Kumhars in Lahore (c. 1859–1869)

The Punjab region is diverse. Historic census reports taken in the colonial era details the main castes are represented, alongside numerous subcastes and tribes (also known as Jāti or Barādarī), formed parts of the various ethnic groups in the region, contemporarily known as Punjabis, Haryanvis, Hindkowans, Saraikis, Dogras, Paharis, and more.

Tribes of Punjab Province (1881–1931)
Tribe	1881		1891		1901		1911		1921		1931	
Tribe	Pop.	%	Pop.	%	Pop.	%	Pop.	%	Pop.	%	Pop.	%
Jat	4,223,885	20.31%	4,500,340	19.64%	4,884,285	20.04%	4,891,060	20.56%	5,453,747	21.73%	6,070,032	23.74%
Rajput	1,648,426	7.92%	1,747,989	7.63%	1,784,402	7.32%	1,586,274	6.67%	1,853,025	7.38%	2,792,060	10.92%
Brahman	1,040,771	5%	1,069,132	4.67%	1,077,252	4.42%	985,901	4.14%	994,529	3.96%	1,058,598	4.14%
Chuhra	1,039,039	5%	1,175,504	5.13%	1,175,003	4.82%	912,998	3.84%	750,596	2.99%	681,359	2.66%
Chamar	1,033,727	4.97%	1,147,913	5.01%	1,172,118	4.81%	1,075,941	4.52%	1,134,700	4.52%	1,102,465	4.31%
Arain	795,471	3.82%	890,264	3.88%	1,003,698	4.12%	973,888	4.09%	1,086,455	4.33%	1,331,295	5.21%
Julaha	593,199	2.85%	620,401	2.71%	651,800	2.67%	626,960	2.64%	643,403	2.56%	672,243	2.63%
Tarkhan	564,385	2.71%	621,718	2.71%	675,361	2.77%	637,971	2.68%	614,912	2.45%	654,053	2.56%
Gujjar	539,251	2.59%	600,198	2.62%	611,904	2.51%	595,598	2.5%	627,451	2.5%	696,442	2.72%
Arora	538,465	2.59%	603,131	2.63%	647,945	2.66%	667,943	2.81%	707,495	2.82%	775,734	3.03%
Kumhar	465,676	2.24%	515,331	2.25%	561,298	2.3%	542,906	2.28%	570,158	2.27%	620,402	2.43%
Bania	437,000	2.1%	442,000	1.93%	452,000	1.85%	404,000	1.7%	374,169	1.49%	—N/a	—N/a
Jhinwar	418,499	2.01%	458,702	2%	450,362	1.85%	331,951	1.4%	371,418	1.48%	281,512	1.1%
Khatri	392,413	1.89%	418,517	1.83%	433,579	1.78%	423,704	1.78%	452,902	1.8%	516,207	2.02%
Awan	350,848	1.69%	389,402	1.7%	420,504	1.73%	425,450	1.79%	439,975	1.75%	539,242	2.11%
Kanet	346,000	1.66%	370,000	1.61%	390,000	1.6%	404,000	1.7%	288,159	1.15%	305,814	1.2%
Mochi	334,034	1.61%	384,179	1.68%	408,314	1.68%	410,977	1.73%	429,242	1.71%	472,616	1.85%
Baloch	331,851	1.6%	383,138	1.67%	466,645	1.92%	530,976	2.23%	531,084	2.12%	624,695	2.44%
Nai	323,703	1.56%	371,144	1.62%	370,019	1.52%	344,845	1.45%	360,653	1.44%	380,657	1.49%
Sheikh	293,606	1.41%	287,778	1.26%	264,656	1.09%	276,687	1.16%	244,800	0.98%	414,623	1.62%
Lohar	291,506	1.4%	323,420	1.41%	347,099	1.42%	319,847	1.34%	322,195	1.28%	333,910	1.31%
Teli	250,544	1.2%	291,513	1.27%	309,433	1.27%	284,505	1.2%	305,122	1.22%	346,342	1.35%
Pathan	210,613	1.01%	221,262	0.97%	246,790	1.01%	272,547	1.15%	261,729	1.04%	350,008	1.37%
Sayyid	200,728	0.96%	217,034	0.95%	230,802	0.95%	239,160	1.01%	247,087	0.98%	294,223	1.15%
Mirasi	192,107	0.92%	230,700	1.01%	244,506	1%	223,093	0.94%	232,280	0.93%	244,726	0.96%
Machhi	167,882	0.81%	196,574	0.86%	236,122	0.97%	239,702	1.01%	280,956	1.12%	314,862	1.23%
Ahir	165,878	0.8%	188,838	0.82%	197,805	0.81%	201,299	0.85%	201,539	0.8%	221,933	0.87%
Kashmiri	149,733	0.72%	141,280	0.62%	189,878	0.78%	175,334	0.74%	166,449	0.66%	202,920	0.79%
Saini	147,183	0.71%	120,507	0.53%	121,722	0.5%	107,759	0.45%	120,376	0.48%	165,190	0.65%
Sunar	145,903	0.7%	164,087	0.72%	174,628	0.72%	155,993	0.66%	127,090	0.51%	159,655	0.62%
Kamboh	129,468	0.62%	150,646	0.66%	173,780	0.71%	171,536	0.72%	180,870	0.72%	239,582	0.94%
Dhobi	123,767	0.6%	139,421	0.61%	142,342	0.58%	151,566	0.64%	163,908	0.65%	175,557	0.69%
Meo	112,566	0.54%	115,916	0.51%	133,300	0.55%	120,752	0.51%	111,564	0.44%	133,089	0.52%
Faqir	111,995	0.54%	300,214	1.31%	362,266	1.49%	262,511	1.1%	270,070	1.08%	287,445	1.12%
Ghirath	110,507	0.53%	118,631	0.52%	121,718	0.5%	121,107	0.51%	117,949	0.47%	124,340	0.49%
Chhimba	100,448	0.48%	141,819	0.62%	147,152	0.6%	124,090	0.52%	120,695	0.48%	96,269	0.38%
Qassab	92,571	0.45%	109,435	0.48%	114,158	0.47%	117,363	0.49%	120,820	0.48%	127,198	0.5%
Rathi	82,957	0.4%	100,656	0.44%	37,793	0.16%	97,763	0.41%	118,015	0.47%	134,096	0.52%
Dagi & Koli	78,559	0.38%	167,772	0.73%	153,990	0.63%	172,269	0.72%	165,159	0.66%	182,235	0.71%
Mughal	92,000	0.44%	118,000	0.51%	98,000	0.4%	99,000	0.42%	88,951	0.35%	—N/a	—N/a
Jogi-Rawal	90,000	0.43%	91,000	0.4%	76,000	0.31%	83,000	0.35%	80,577	0.32%	—N/a	—N/a
Dumna	66,169	0.32%	64,046	0.28%	53,394	0.22%	72,250	0.3%	36,669	0.15%	37,541	0.15%
Dhanuk	66,000	0.32%	74,000	0.32%	77,000	0.32%	83,000	0.35%	87,278	0.35%	—N/a	—N/a
Dogar	63,000	0.01%	70,000	0.01%	75,000	0.01%	68,000	0.29%	74,369	0.3%	—N/a	—N/a
Khoja	62,000	0.3%	90,000	0.39%	99,000	0.41%	63,000	0.26%	87,461	0.35%	—N/a	—N/a
Mallah	62,000	0.3%	77,000	0.34%	73,000	0.3%	78,000	0.33%	74,233	0.3%	—N/a	—N/a
Mali	58,672	0.28%	95,989	0.42%	105,956	0.43%	96,883	0.41%	92,933	0.37%	85,758	0.34%
Bharai	56,000	0.27%	67,000	0.29%	66,000	0.27%	58,000	0.24%	61,721	0.25%	—N/a	—N/a
Barwala	55,000	0.26%	64,000	0.28%	69,000	0.28%	64,000	0.27%	65,907	0.26%	—N/a	—N/a
Mahtam	50,313	0.24%	56,982	0.25%	82,719	0.34%	81,805	0.34%	94,325	0.38%	65,262	0.26%
Labana	47,000	0.23%	55,000	0.24%	56,000	0.23%	58,000	0.24%	56,316	0.22%	—N/a	—N/a
Megh	37,373	0.18%	41,068	0.18%	44,315	0.18%	39,549	0.17%	30,465	0.12%	23,207	0.09%
Khokhar	36,000	0.17%	130,000	0.57%	108,000	0.44%	60,000	0.25%	69,169	0.28%	—N/a	—N/a
Darzi	30,190	0.15%	36,919	0.16%	39,164	0.16%	35,508	0.15%	38,256	0.15%	45,688	0.18%
Bawaria	22,013	0.11%	26,420	0.12%	29,112	0.12%	32,849	0.14%	34,807	0.14%	32,527	0.13%
Sansi	19,920	0.1%	22,218	0.1%	26,000	0.11%	24,439	0.1%	17,402	0.07%	165,190	0.65%
Od	15,652	0.08%	22,450	0.1%	26,160	0.11%	31,690	0.13%	28,502	0.11%	32,719	0.13%
Sarera	10,792	0.05%	11,366	0.05%	9,587	0.04%	10,743	0.05%	9,873	0.04%	11,230	0.04%
Pakhiwara	3,741	0.02%	3,674	0.02%	3,595	0.01%	3,711	0.02%	2,801	0.01%	4,540	0.02%
Ghosi	2,221	0.01%	2,652	0.01%	3,012	0.01%	2,419	0.01%	502	0%	3,853	0.02%
Harni	1,318	0.01%	4,157	0.02%	3,462	0.01%	3,360	0.01%	2,988	0.01%	3,928	0.02%
Maliar	—N/a	—N/a	—N/a	—N/a	81,000	0.33%	90,000	0.38%	88,755	0.35%	—N/a	—N/a
Mussalli	—N/a	—N/a	—N/a	—N/a	57,367	0.24%	309,543	1.3%	323,549	1.29%	412,300	1.61%
Qureshi	—N/a	—N/a	—N/a	—N/a	53,000	0.22%	71,000	0.3%	97,625	0.39%	—N/a	—N/a
Aggarwal	—N/a	—N/a	—N/a	—N/a	—N/a	—N/a	339,494	1.43%	349,322	1.39%	379,068	1.48%
Bagaria	—N/a	—N/a	—N/a	—N/a	—N/a	—N/a	1,262	0.01%	1,619	0.01%	2,446	0.01%
Ramdasia	—N/a	—N/a	—N/a	—N/a	—N/a	—N/a	—N/a	—N/a	—N/a	—N/a	126,487	0.49%
Kahar	—N/a	—N/a	—N/a	—N/a	—N/a	—N/a	—N/a	—N/a	—N/a	—N/a	88,656	0.35%
Tank Kshatrya	—N/a	—N/a	—N/a	—N/a	—N/a	—N/a	—N/a	—N/a	—N/a	—N/a	37,376	0.15%
Dhiman Brahman	—N/a	—N/a	—N/a	—N/a	—N/a	—N/a	—N/a	—N/a	—N/a	—N/a	13,533	0.05%
No tribe	—N/a	—N/a	—N/a	—N/a	—N/a	—N/a	—N/a	—N/a	—N/a	—N/a	6,816	0.03%
Total responses	—N/a	—N/a	—N/a	—N/a	—N/a	—N/a	—N/a	—N/a	—N/a	—N/a	25,569,792	89.75%
Total population	20,800,995	100%	22,915,894	100%	24,367,113	100%	23,791,841	100%	25,101,514	100%	28,490,869	100%

== Economy ==
The historical region of Punjab produces a relatively high proportion of the food output from India and Pakistan. The region has been used for extensive wheat farming. In addition, rice, cotton, sugarcane, fruit, and vegetables are also grown.

The agricultural output of the Punjab region in Pakistan contributes significantly to Pakistan's GDP. The Indian state of Punjab is currently the 16th richest state or the eighth richest large state of India. Pakistani Punjab produces 68% of Pakistan's foodgrain production. Its share of Pakistan's GDP has historically ranged from 51.8% to 54.7%. and has the highest per capita of any province.

Called "The Granary of India" or "The Bread Basket of India", Indian Punjab produces 1% of the world's rice, 2% of its wheat, and 2% of its cotton. In 2001, it was recorded that farmers made up 39% of Indian Punjab's workforce. In the Punjab region of Pakistan, 42.3% of the labour force is engaged in the agriculture sector.

Alternatively, Punjab is also adding to the economy with the increase in employment of Punjab youth in the private sector. Government schemes such as 'Ghar Ghar Rozgar and Karobar Mission' have brought enhanced employability in the private sector. As of October 2019, more than 32,000 youths have been placed in different jobs and 12,000 have been skill-trained.

== See also ==
- History of Punjab
- Punjabi music
- Punjabi culture
- List of Punjabi people
- List of cities of Punjab

== Bibliography ==
- Dyson, Tim (2018). A Population History of India: From the First Modern People to the Present Day. Oxford University Press. ISBN 978-0-19-882905-8.
- Kumar, Sunil (2020). "The Delhi Sultanate as Empire". In Bang, Peter Fibiger; Bayly, C. A.; Scheidel, Walter (eds.). The Oxford World History of Empire. Vol. 2. Oxford University Press. ISBN 978-0-19-753276-8.
- Halbfass, Wilhelm (1991), Tradition and Reflection: Explorations in Indian Thought, State University of New York Press, ISBN 0-7914-0362-9
- Jackson, Peter (2003). The Delhi Sultanate: A Political and Military History. Cambridge University Press. ISBN 978-0-521-40477-8.
- Mahajan, Vidya Dhar (2007) [1991]. History of Medieval India, Sultanate Period And Mughal Period. New Delhi: S. Chand. ISBN 978-8-1-219-0364-6.
- Michaels, Alex (2004) [1998], Hinduism: Past and Present, translated by Barbara Harshaw, Princeton University Press, ISBN 0691089523
- Rehman, Abdur (January 1976). The Last Two Dynasties of the Sahis: An analysis of their history, archaeology, coinage and palaeography (Thesis). Australian National University.
- Roy, Kaushik (2004). India's Historic Battles: From Alexander the Great to Kargil. Permanent Black, India. pp. 80–1. ISBN 978-81-7824-109-8.
- Shackle, Christopher (1979). "Problems of classification in Pakistan Panjab". Transactions of the Philological Society. 77 (1): 191–210. doi:10.1111/j.1467-968X.1979.tb00857.x. ISSN 0079-1636.
