= Tomb of Sikandar Lodi =

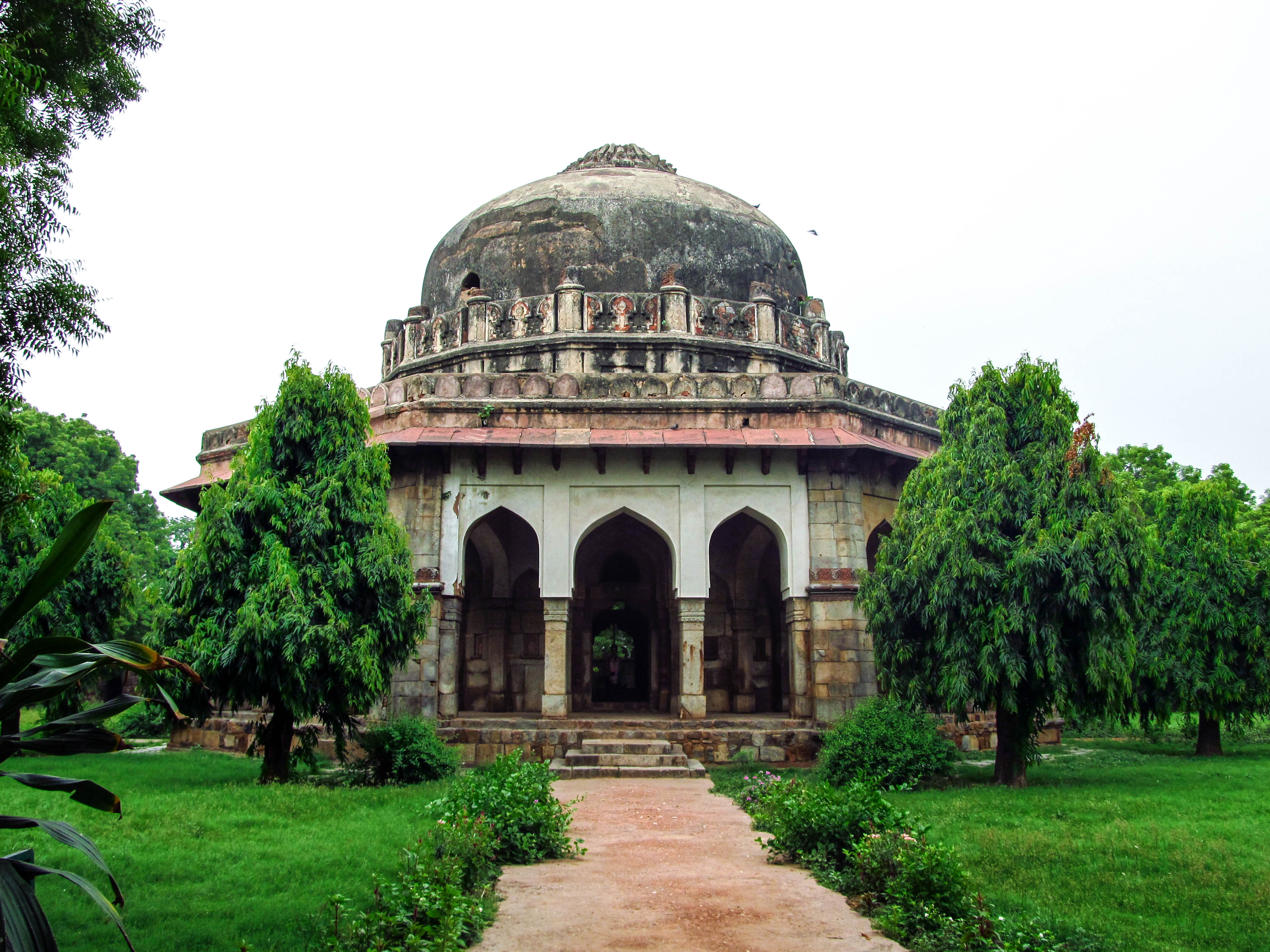
- Sikandar Lodi's tomb at Lodi Gardens

- Location within Delhi
- 28°35′46.5324″N 77°13′17.6340″E
- Type: Historic monument and mausoleum
- Location: Lodi Gardens

History
- Built: 1517–1518; 508 years ago

Site notes
- Architectural styles: Islamic and Hindu architecture
- Governing body: Archaeological Survey of India, NDMC
- Owner: Government of Delhi

Scheduled monument
- Official name: Sikandar Lodi's tomb
- Designated: 9 April 1936
- Reference no.: N-DL-75

The Tomb of Sikandar Lodi is the tomb of the second ruler of the Lodi Dynasty, Sikandar Lodi (reign: 1489–1517 CE) situated in New Delhi, India. The tomb is situated in Lodi Gardens in Delhi and was built in 1517–1518 CE by his son Ibrahim Lodi. The monument is situated 100 meters away from the Bara Gumbad and the area in which it is situated was formerly a village called Khairpur.

== History ==
Sikandar Khan Lodi (born Nizam Khan), was the Sultan of Delhi between 1489 and 1517 CE and was the son of Bahlul Lodi. After the death of his father in 1489, Sikandar Lodi assumed the reign the same year and ruled until his death in 1517 CE. Upon Sikandar Lodi's death in 1517 CE, his son Ibrahim Lodi built the tomb. The Tomb of Sikandar Lodi was inspired in part by the tomb of Muhammad Shah which is also situated in the Lodi Gardens.

== Construction and Architecture ==
The Tomb of Sikandar Lodi was inspired in parts by the tomb of Muhammad Shah. It has octagonal design and the architectural style is Indo-Islamic. The tomb is the first garden tomb in Indian subcontinent and is India's earliest surviving enclosed garden tomb.

The tomb is enclosed within a fortified complex (entered from a south facing gateway) with the main entrance having two umbrella shaped domes (pavilions) which was designed to preserve the symmetry and relative proportions of the body of the building. Both pavilions on the square platform in the front have remains of blue tiles. The tomb is situated in the middle of a large garden and tall boundary walls. The tomb chamber is surrounded by a wide veranda with carved pillars with each side pierced by three arches and the angles occupied by sloping buttresses.

The walls of the tomb have Mughal architectural designs and many foreign languages have been inscribed on the walls. The tomb is decorated with enameled tiles of various colors. Inside the complex, the western wall has also been built to serve as a wall mosque since the Quibla is indicated through arches and paved area in the front.

== Location ==
The Tomb of Sikandar Lodi is located in and is a part of Lodi Gardens in Delhi, India. The village where the monument stands was earlier called Khairpur. The garden is bounded by Amrita Shergill Marg on the west, northwest and north, Max Mueller Marg on the east and Lodi Road on the south side. Safdarjang Tomb is situated in the southwest corner of Lodi Gardens.

== Gallery ==
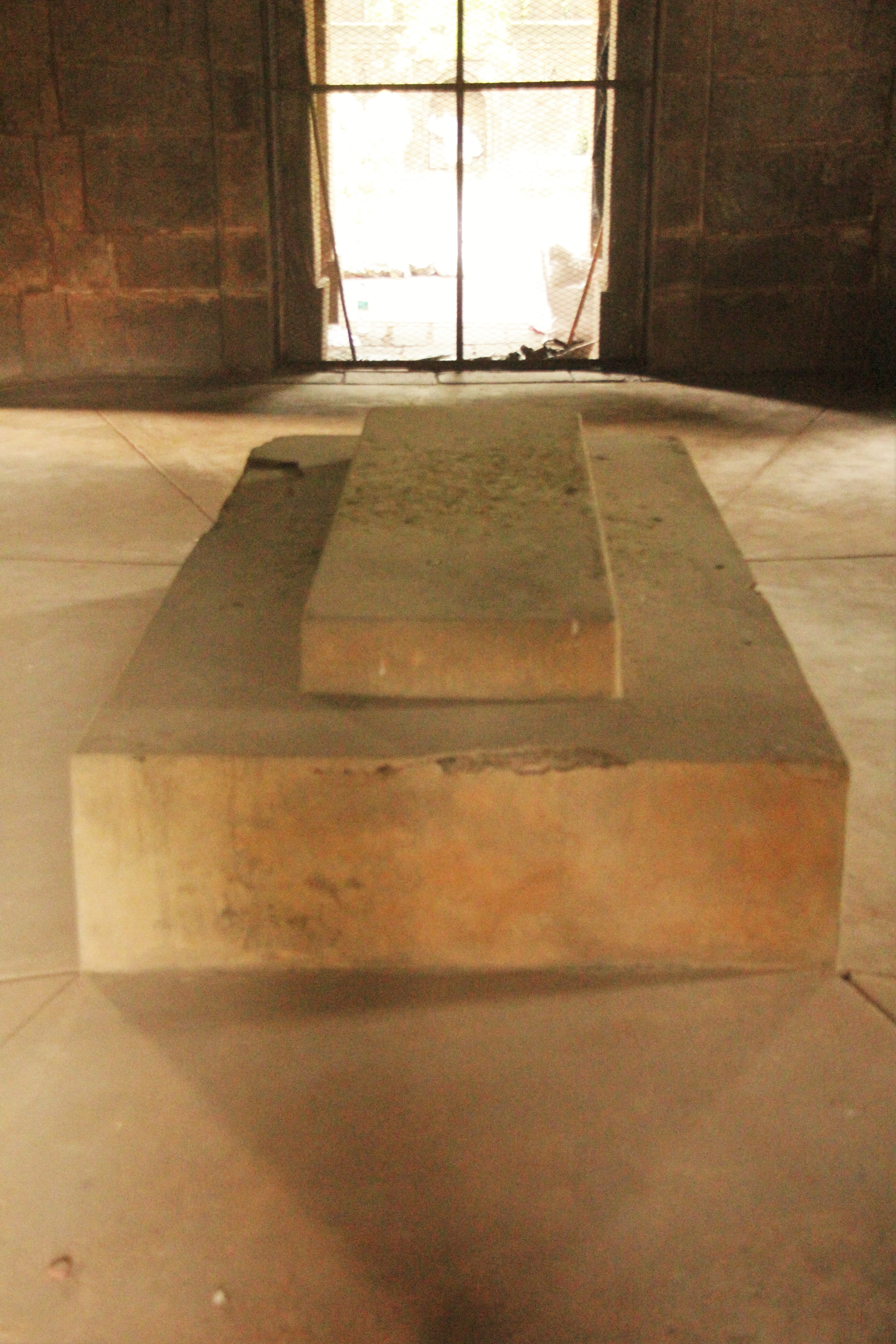
Tomb

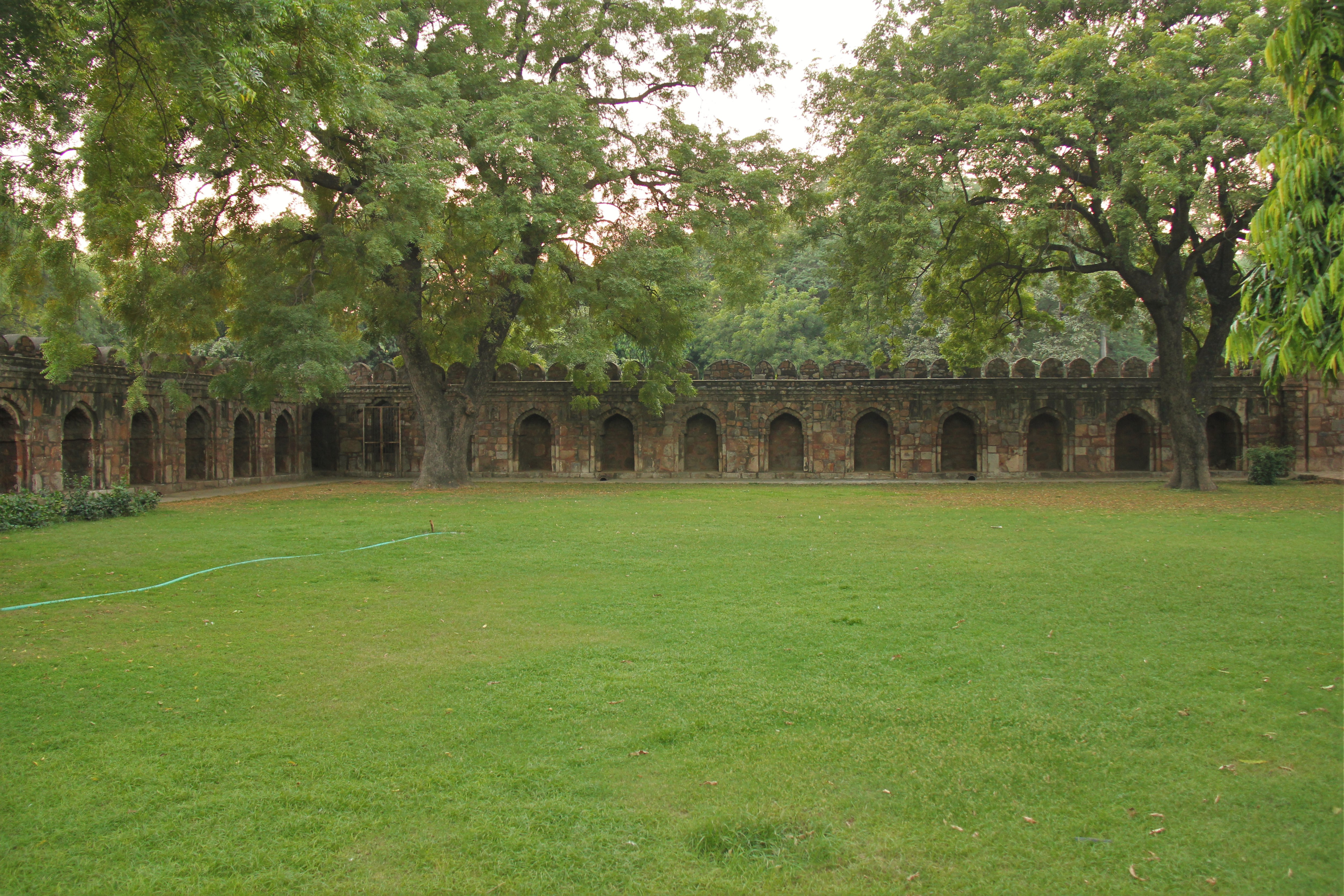
Fortified walls as seen from inside the complex

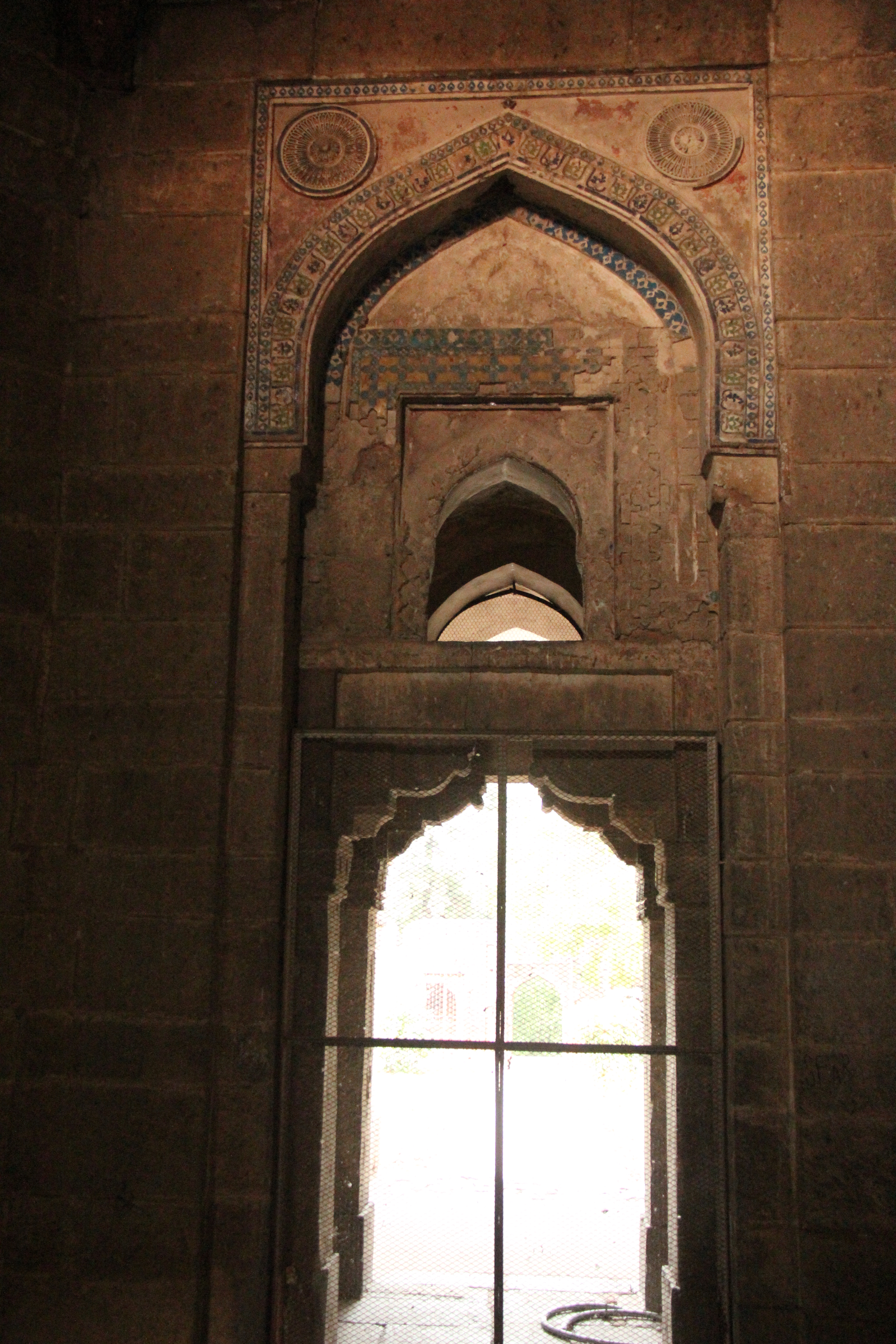
Window inside main chamber

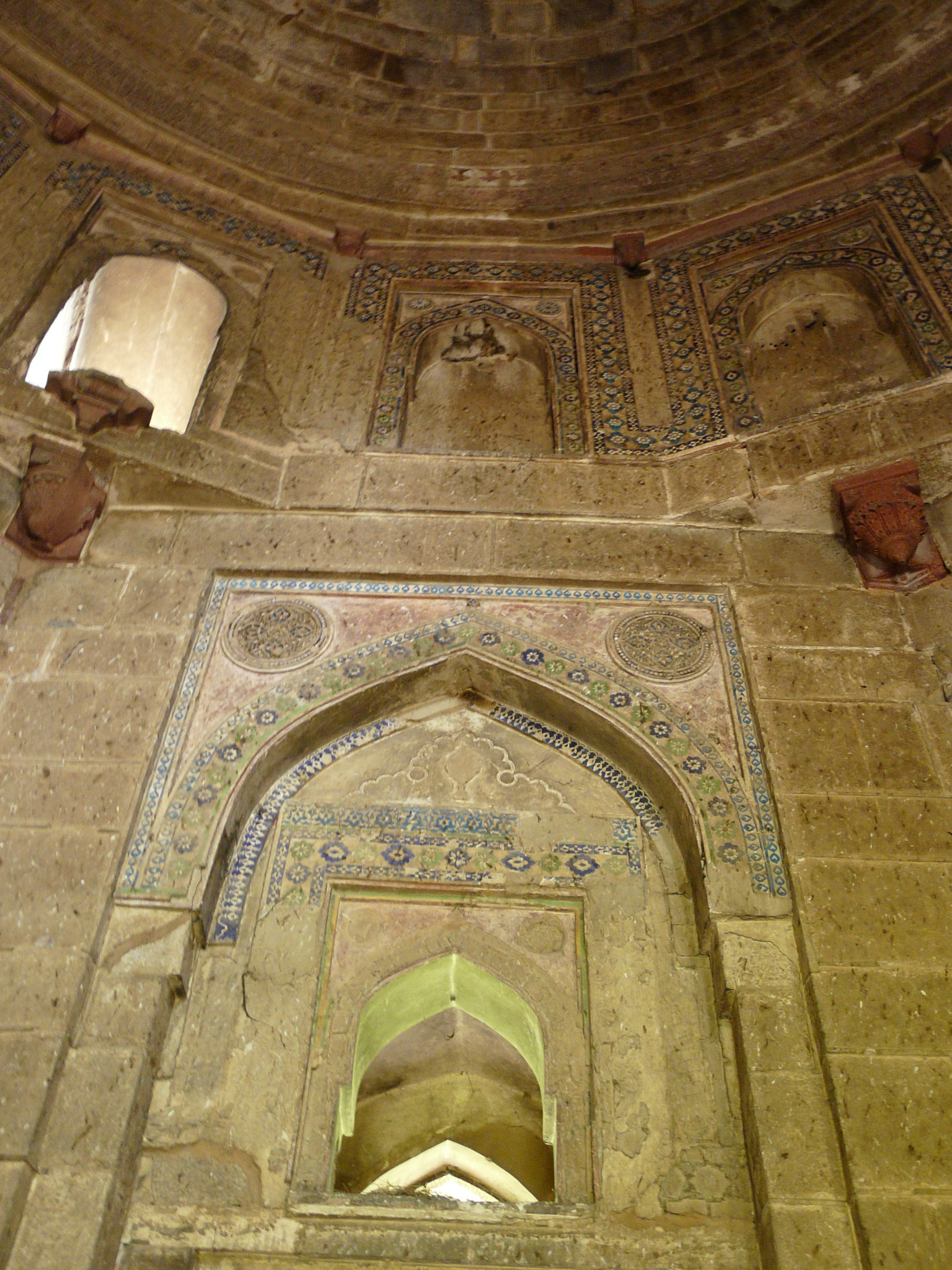
Tomb interior tile-work

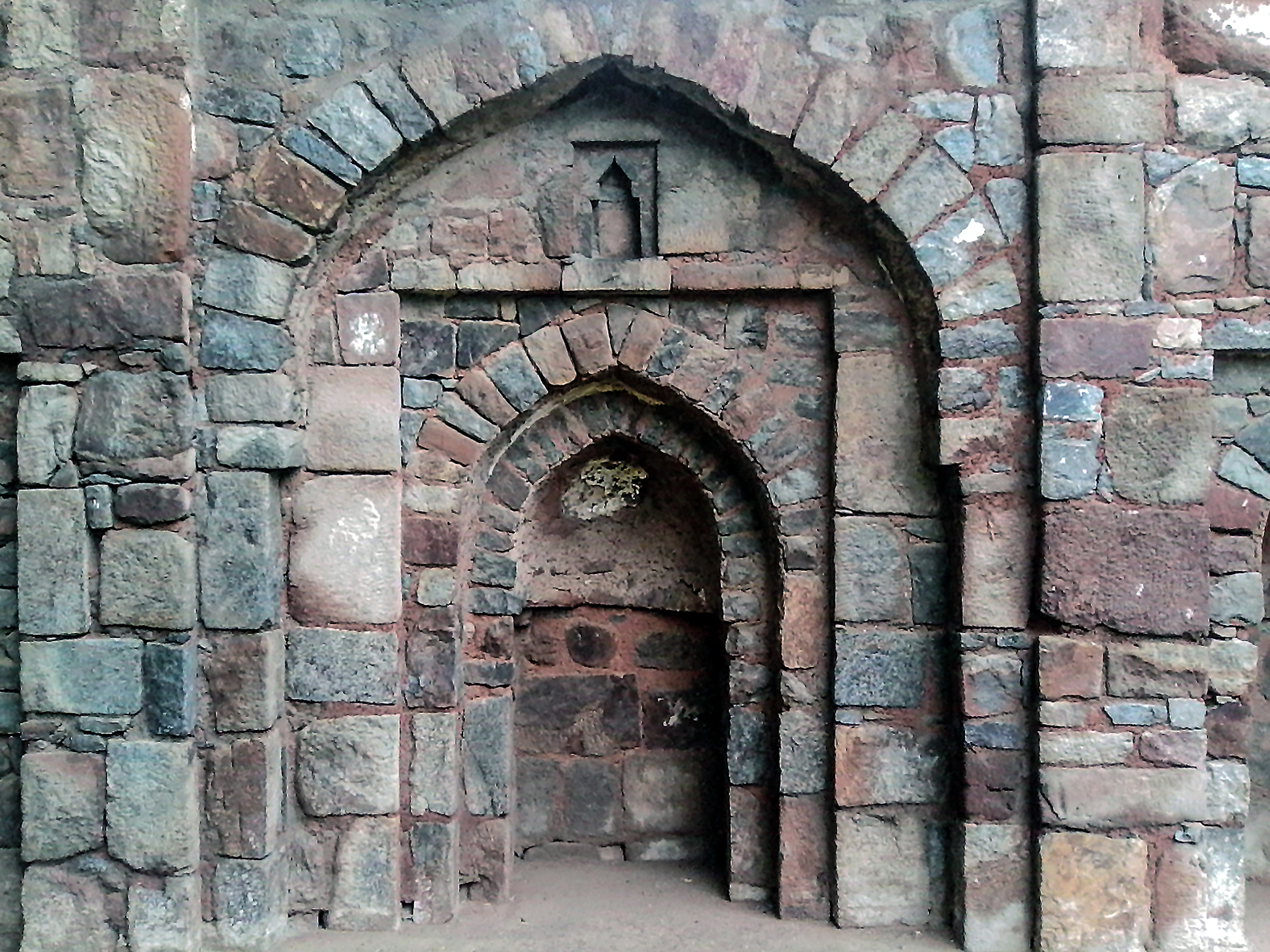
Central Mihrab, Sikander Lodi's Tomb wall mosque

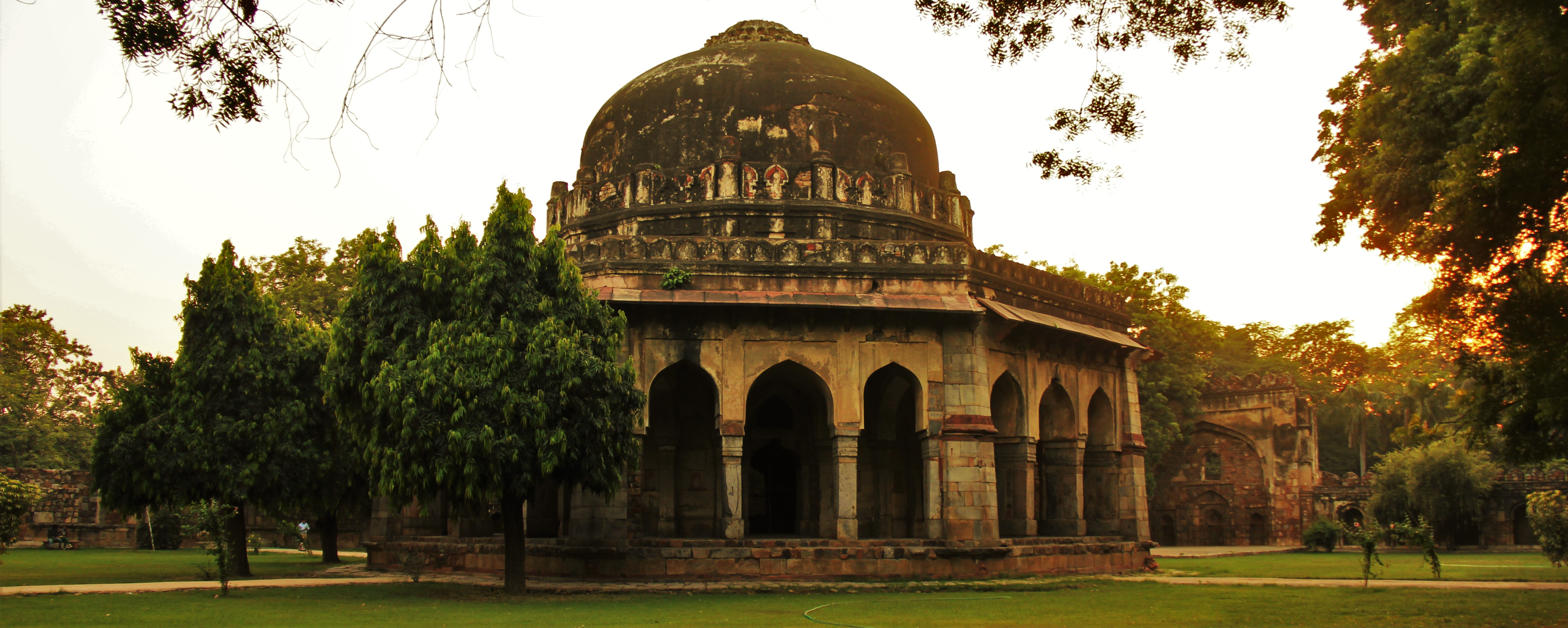
Sikandar Lodi's tomb at sunset

== See also ==
- Tomb of Bahlol Lodi
- Tomb of Ibrahim Lodi
- Bara Gumbad
- List of Monuments of National Importance in Delhi
- Lodi Gardens
- Shisha Gumbad
