= Tomb of Bahlul Lodi =

Tomb in Delhi, India

Tomb of Bahlol Lodi
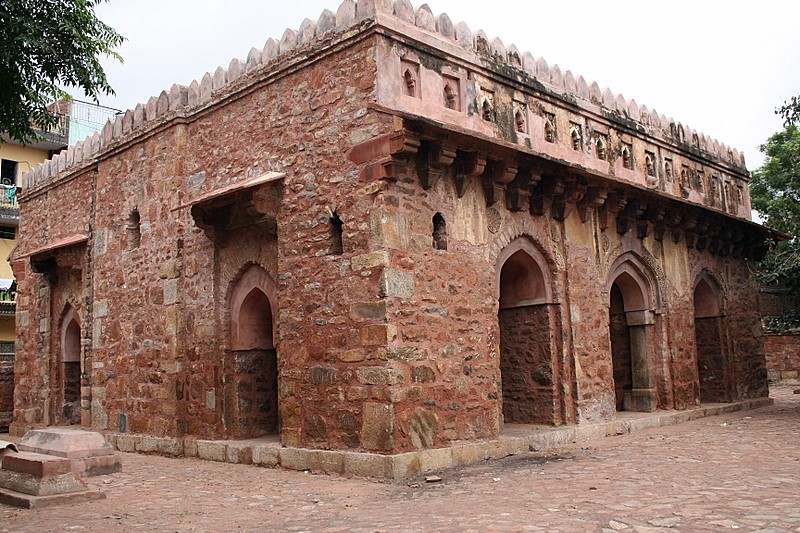
- Main entrance of Bahlol Lodi's tomb

- Location within Delhi

General information
- Type: Tomb
- Architectural style: Afghan architecture
- Location: Chirag Dilli, Delhi, India
- Coordinates: 28.5386944°N 77.2221359°E
- Construction started: 1490 CE
- Completed: 1501 CE
- Governing body: Archaeological Survey of India

Tomb of Bahlul Lodi is a building situated in Delhi, India, which is allegedly the tomb of an emperor of Delhi Sultanate and the founder of the Lodi Dynasty, Bahlul Khan Lodi (r. 1451 – 1489 A.D). The tomb is located in a historic settlement, Chirag Delhi, located within the fort walls of the Jahapanah city (built by the Tughlaqs). This tomb is one of the finest examples which demonstrate the evolution of Lodi architecture. It was built by Sikandar Khan, son and successor of Bahlul Khan Lodi after the demise of his father in July 1489 A.D. The identification of the building in Chirag Delhi as Bahlul's tomb is disputed among historians, some of whom suggest the Sheesh Gumbad in the Lodi Gardens as the site of Bahlul Lodi's grave.

== Architecture ==
The tomb is constructed in rubble masonry. The roof is crowned by five domes, the central one being fluted. The tomb chamber is surmounted by a dome of red sandstone surrounded by a broad dripstone : it has been much modernized at various times. A Gold cup hangs over the grave, as in the Khizri mosque at Nizam-ud-din. In the north-west corner of the enclosure is a fine Assembly Hall. The central columns springs from four monolithic stone columns, a unique architectural feature of that period. Each of its four facades is broken by three archways supported on red sandstone columns and their spandrels are ornamented with medallions. The arches are also decorated with inscriptions incised in plaster.

To the front of it on the south side is a grave enclosure surrounded by a pierced screen of red sandstone, which contrasts with the Green Shade above it. The octagonal motif that juts out between the cramped 3-storey buildings is typical of Lodi Architecture, though the five domes are unusual considering the architecture of that period.

== Premises ==
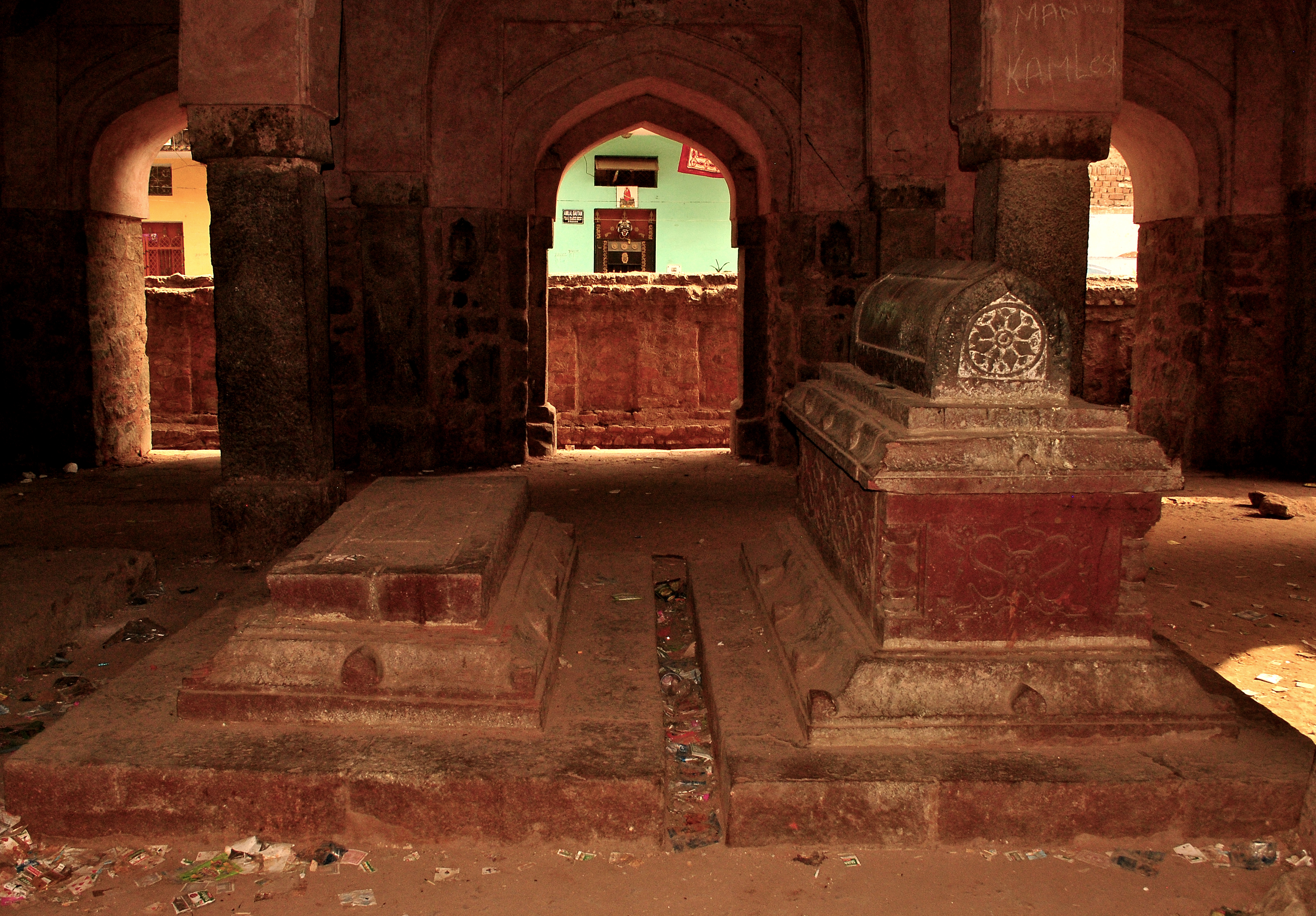
Graves inside Bahlul Lodhi's tomb

The monument is located in the alleys of the modern day Chirag Dilli, behind the shrine of Nasiruddin Mahmud, a disciple of saint Nizamuddin Chishti, commonly referred to as Chirag-e-Dilli, where the king wished to be buried.

About a dozen graves are scattered out in the open; and Bahlul Lodi's grave is located next to two other graves inside the enclosure. It is a simple octagonal structure with 3-arched openings on all sides, perceivably reflecting the king's humble demeanour, bearing inscriptions from the Quran.The structure does not have much decorative materials or heavy precious stones used, only it has some Quranic verses inscribed over the arched walls.

== Conservation ==
The tomb is under the protection of Archaeological Survey of India (ASI), and was repaired and restored in 2005. According to a survey report, the site was under a layer of earth which had to be excavated. With reference to the archival images, the tomb was conserved and the missing portions were reconstructed. As the original site was encroached and boundaries were altered, a new wall and entrance to the tomb were constructed and the site was handed over to ASI for conservation and preservation.

== See also ==
- Ibrahim Lodhi's Tomb
- Tomb of Sikandar Lodi
- Bahlul Lodi
- Delhi Sultanate
- Lodi Gardens
- List of Monuments of National Importance in Delhi
