= Bara Gumbad =

Monument and mosque in Delhi, India

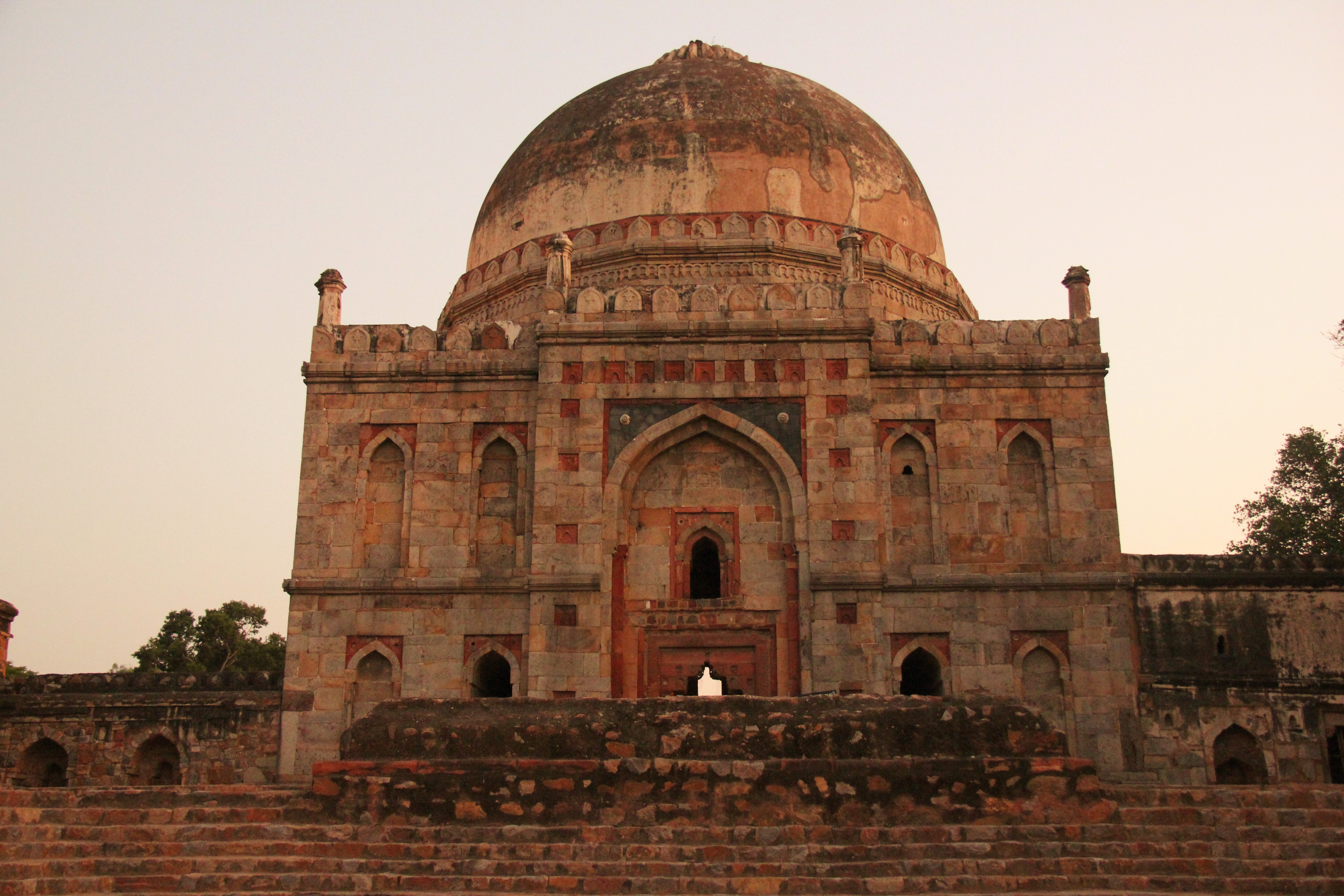
- Bara Gumbad at Lodi Gardens

- Location of the monument site in Central Delhi

Religion
- Affiliation: Islam
- Ecclesiastical or organisational status: Historic monument and mosque
- Ownership: Government of Delhi
- Status: Active (as a mosque)

Location
- Location: Lodi Gardens, Central Delhi, Delhi NCT
- Country: India
- Administration: Archaeological Survey of India; New Delhi Municipal Council
- Coordinates: 28°35′34.4″N 77°13′12.7″E

Architecture
- Type: Mosque architecture
- Style: Indo-Islamic; Lodi
- Founder: Sikandar Lodi (attrib.)
- Completed: 1490 CE (Bara Gumbad); 1494 CE (mosque)

Specifications
- Length: 20 m (66 ft) (Bara Gumbad)
- Width: 20 m (66 ft) (Bara Gumbad)
- Interior area: 361 m^{2} (3,890 ft^{2}) (Bara Gumbad); 20 m^{2} (220 ft^{2}) (mosque)
- Height (max): 29 m (95 ft) (Bara Gumbad)
- Dome: Multiple
- Minaret: Two
- Site area: 1,050 m^{2} (11,300 sq ft)
- Materials: Sandstone

Monument of National Importance
- Official name: Mosque with the dalans and courtyard; Bara Gumbad (the domed entrance to the mosque)
- Designated: 9 April 1936
- Reference no.: N-DL-73

The Bara Gumbad (lit. 'big dome') is a medieval monument located in Lodi Gardens in Delhi, India. It is part of a group of monuments that include a Friday mosque (Jama Masjid) and the "mehman khana" (guest house) of Sikandar Lodi, the ruler of the Delhi Sultanate. The Bara Gumbad was constructed in 1490 CE, during the reign of the Lodi dynasty. Its construction is generally attributed to Sikandar Lodi, and it is believed to have the earliest constructed full dome of any building in Delhi.

The monument is situated near the Tomb of Sikandar Lodi and Shisha Gumbad. Although the three structures, which share a common raised platform, were all built during the Lodi reign, they were not constructed at the same time. The intended purpose of the builders of Bara Gumbad is unclear: it may have been intended as a free-standing tomb, but no tombstone has been identified, or as a gateway. The area in which Bara Gumbad is situated was formally called Khairpur village.

Bara Gumbad and the associated mosque are a Monument of National Importance, under the administration of the Archaeological Survey of India.

== History ==
Bada Gumbad was constructed in 1490 CE, and is believed to have the earliest constructed full dome of any building in Delhi. Its construction is generally attributed to Sikandar Lodi. A mihrab (prayer niche) in the adjacent Friday mosque (Jama Masjid) gives the mosque's date of construction as 900 AH (1494/1495 CE).

Including the Bada Gumbad, there are four monuments in the Lodi Gardens; the other three being Tomb of Sikandar Lodi, Shisha Gumbad, and the tomb of Muhammad Shah (who belonged to the Sayyid dynasty). The Bada Gumbad is situated approximately 400 metres (1,300 ft) southwest of the tomb and 75 metres (246 ft) south of Shisha Gumbad. During the rule of Sikandar Lodi, the Bara Gumbad, the adjacent mosque, and the "mehman khana" (guest house) were constructed. The Bara Gumbad is speculated to serve as a gateway to the Friday mosque. However owing to the construction date, placement and stylistic differences the theory of gateway is not supported. The purpose and significance of the Bara Gumbad is unknown and to date remains a mystery. The Friday mosque was constructed in 1494 CE. It was the first mosque to be built in a style that first appeared during the Lodi Dynasty.

Some historians suggest that the Bara Gumbad was built by an unidentified noble in 1490 CE, before being appropriated by Sikander Lodi in 1494 CE, to provide an entryway to his mosque.

Simon Digby argued, that the Bara Gumbad served as a gateway to a large walled enclosure, which included the Shisha Gumbad, identified by the same scholar as the tomb of Bahlul Lodi.

Initially, all the monuments were built independently, and were not in one confine. In the early twentieth century, a park was developed, bringing the four monuments in one confine. The park was inaugurated on 9 April 1936 by Lady Willingdon, the wife of Viceroy Lord Willingdon. The park was originally called the Lady Willingdon Park after her, but was renamed Lodi Gardens after independence of India in 1947.

== Construction and architecture ==
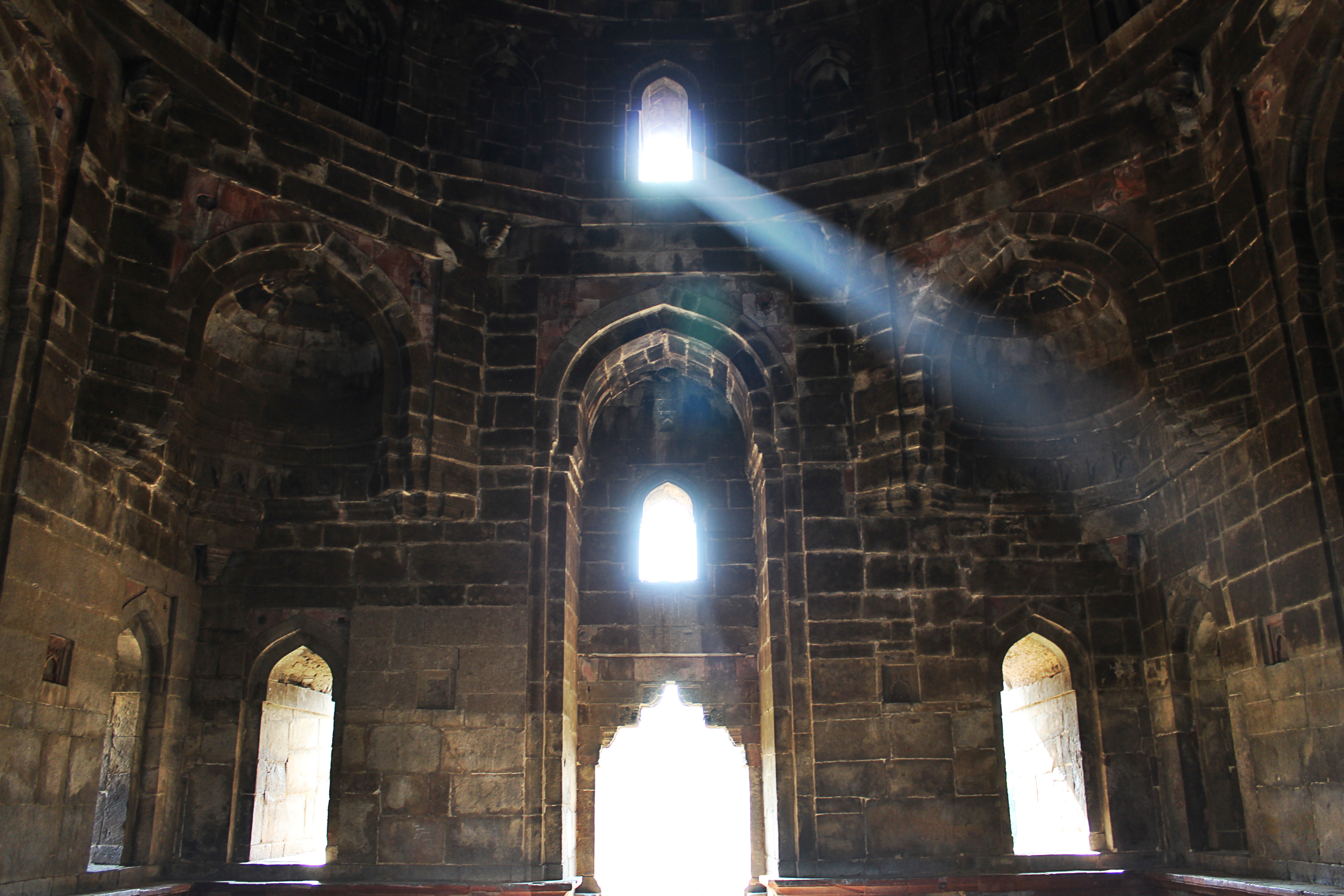
Bara Gumbad interiors.

It is speculated that the Bara Gumbad was constructed to provide a gateway to the nearby mosque or a large walled enclosure. Although the structure does not house any tomb, there is a platform in the central courtyard that suggests the structure to be a burial place. The purpose of Bara Gumbad is unknown. Bara Gumbad is grouped together with a mosque and "mehman khana" which is a smaller structure with five bays. All the structures are constructed on a 4 metres (13 ft) high platform, with a total area of 1,050 square metres (11,302 ft^{2}). The platform measures 30 metres (98 ft) (east-west) and 25 metres (82 ft) (north-south).

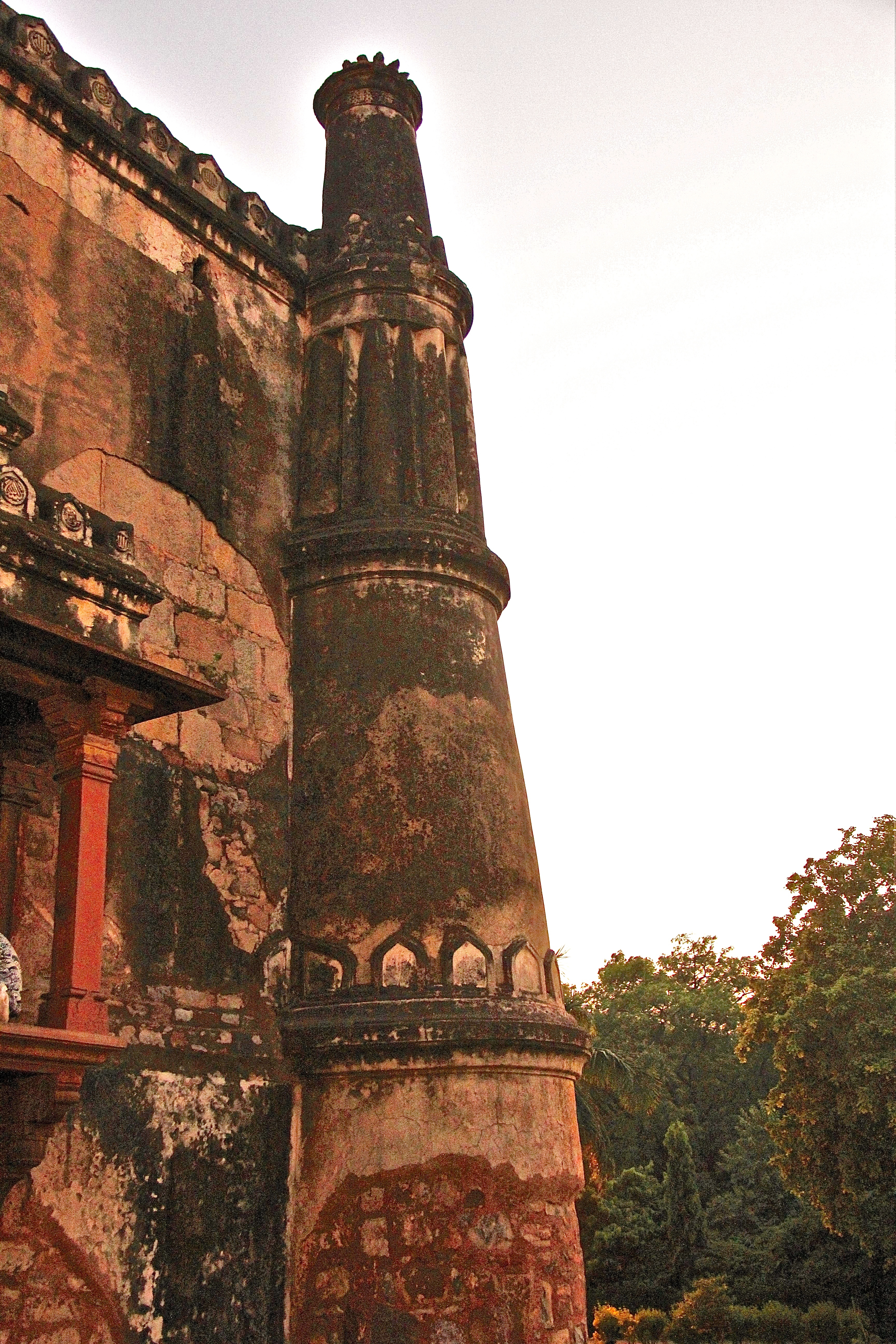
Semi-circular turret of Mosque

Three out of five bays in the mosque have domes whereas the remaining two have vaulted roofs (on mosque and "mehman khana"). The central bays feature low domes, while the end-bays feature flat roofs. There are oriel windows to the north and south. Both the oriel windows and the tapering minarets appear to anticipate later architectural styles.

The Bara Gumbad is square type construction which sits on a plinth. The mosque measures 20 metres (66 ft) on each side. At the rear, the corners and sides of the mosque feature tall tapering semi-circular minars. The east, south, and west are decorated, and feature ogee arch openings, which are set into rectangular frames. The architecture combines bracket and lintel beams, blending Islamic and Hindu architectures.

Bara Gumbad is 29 metres (95 ft) high, 20 metres (66 ft) long and 20 metres (66 ft) wide. The walls are 12 metres (39 ft) tall. Like the Shisha Gumbad, the Bara Gumbad is also a single story structure but has an external semblance of spanning two floors when viewed from outside. Total floor area of Bara Gumbad (excluding the mosque and the guest house) is 361 square metres (3,886 ft^{2}).

The dome, the mosque and the "mehman khana" are constructed of red, grey and black stone, including grey quartzite and red sandstone. The interior is elaborately ornamented with painted stucco. Colored tiles, incised carvings, and painted plaster on the mosque are decorated with foliage, flowers, geometric patterns, and Quranic inscriptions.

== Location ==
The Bara Gumbad is located in and is a part of Lodi Gardens in Delhi, India. The village where the monument stands was earlier called Khairpur. The garden is bounded by Amrita Shergill Marg on the west, northwest and north, Max Mueller Marg on the east and Lodi Road on the south side. Safdarjang Tomb is situated in the southwest corner of Lodi Gardens.

== Gallery ==
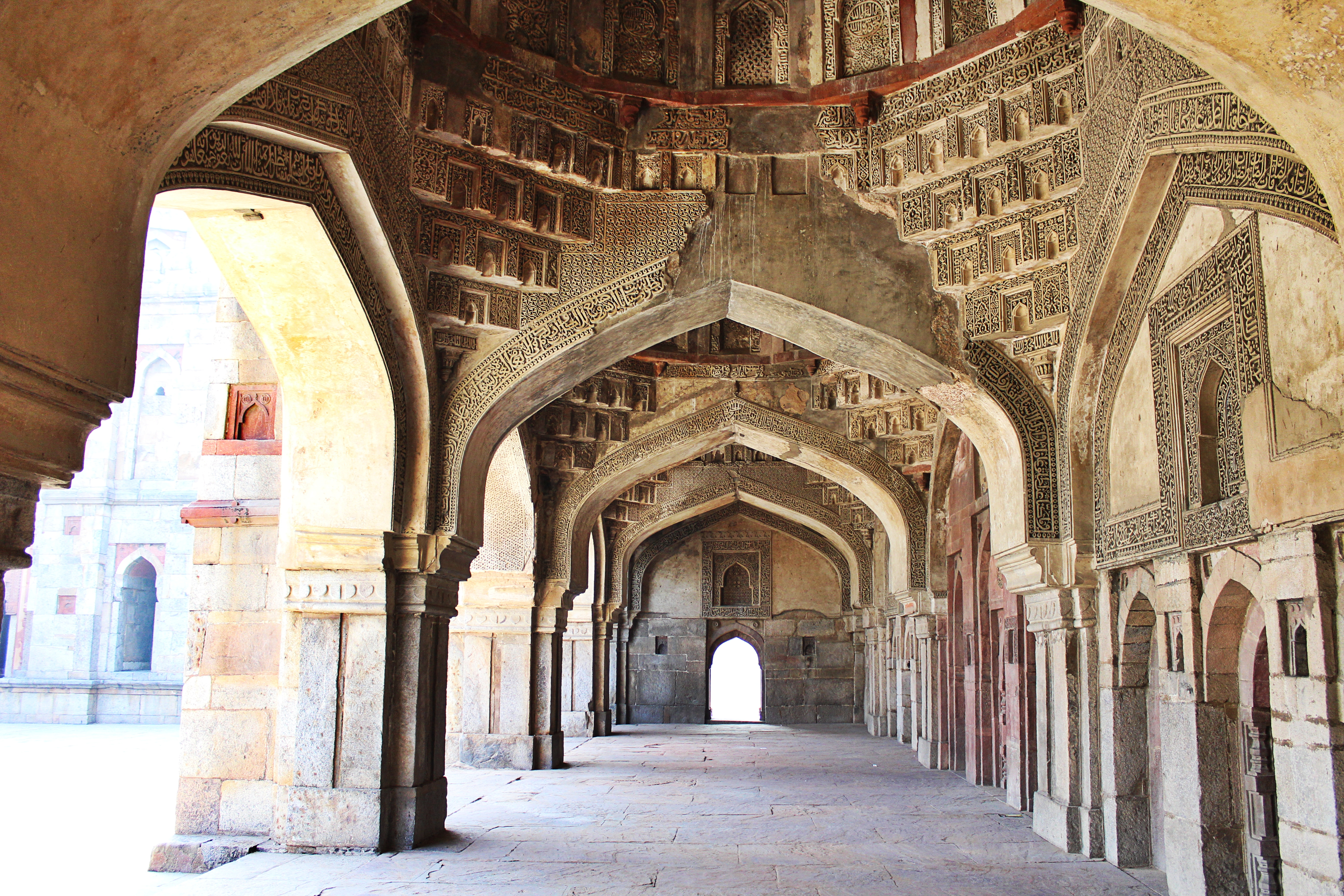
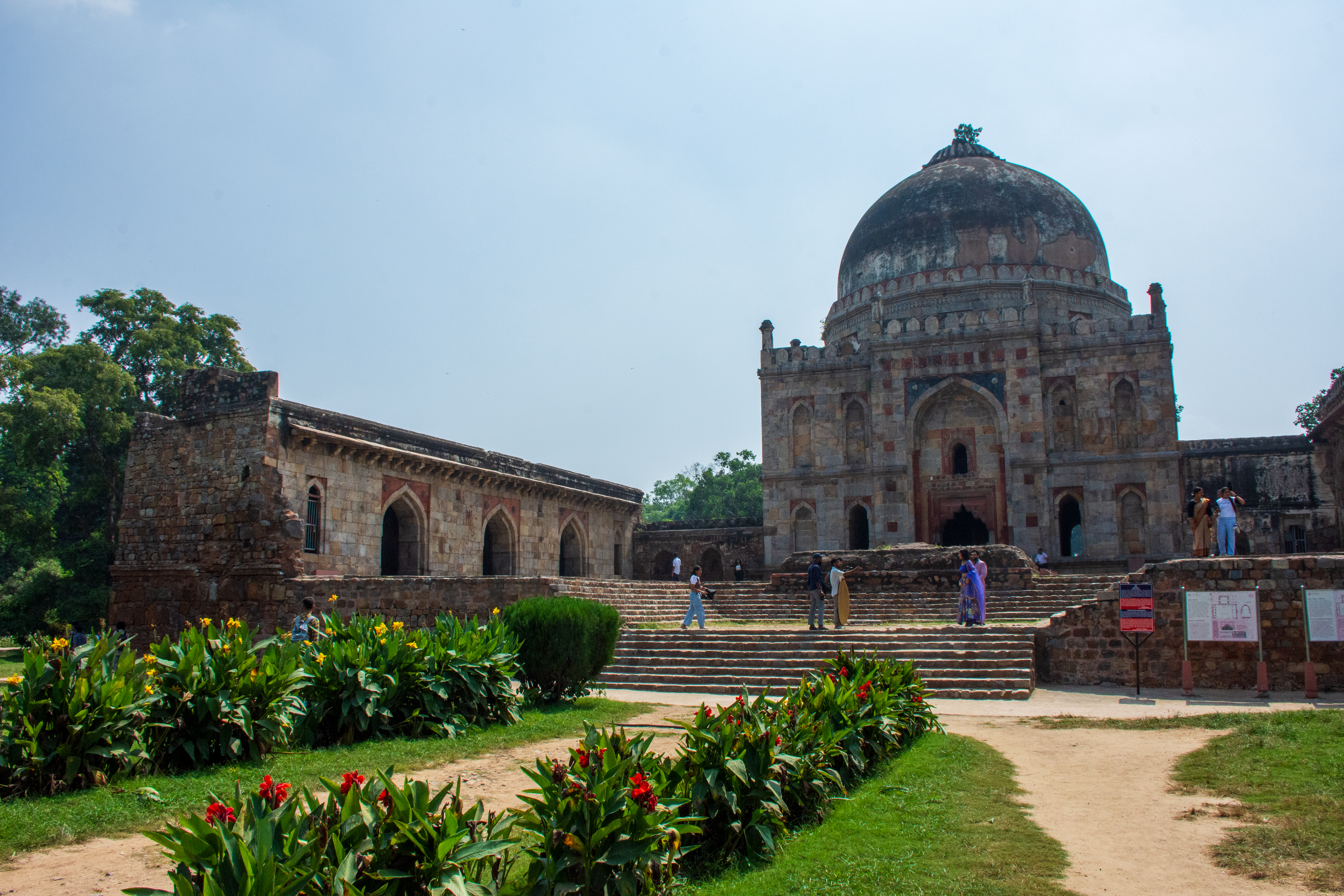
Young Couple in a photoshoot at the Bara Gumbad complex, Lodi Garden, New Delhi.
Bada Gumbad mosque interior

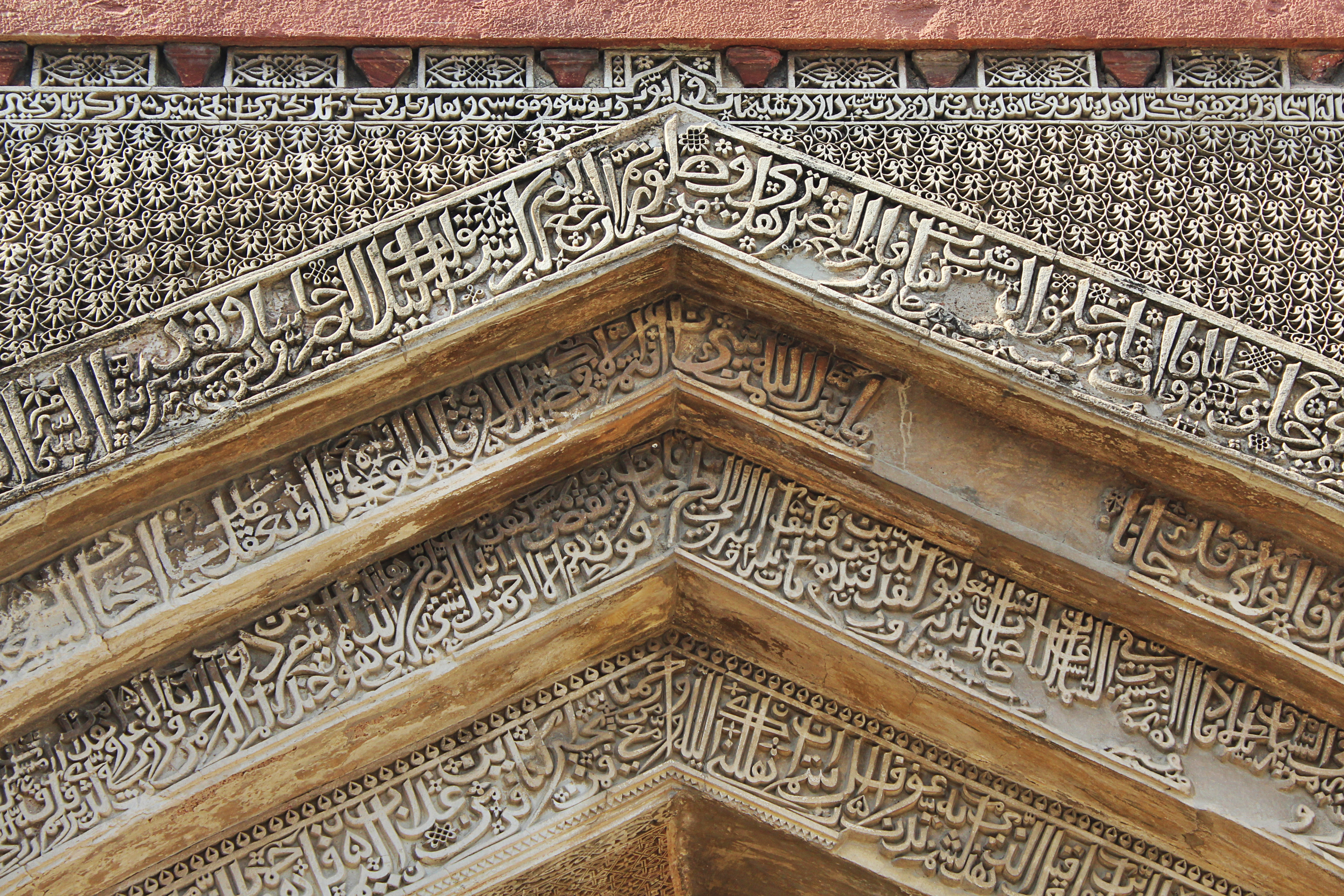
Carvings on the exterior of the mosque

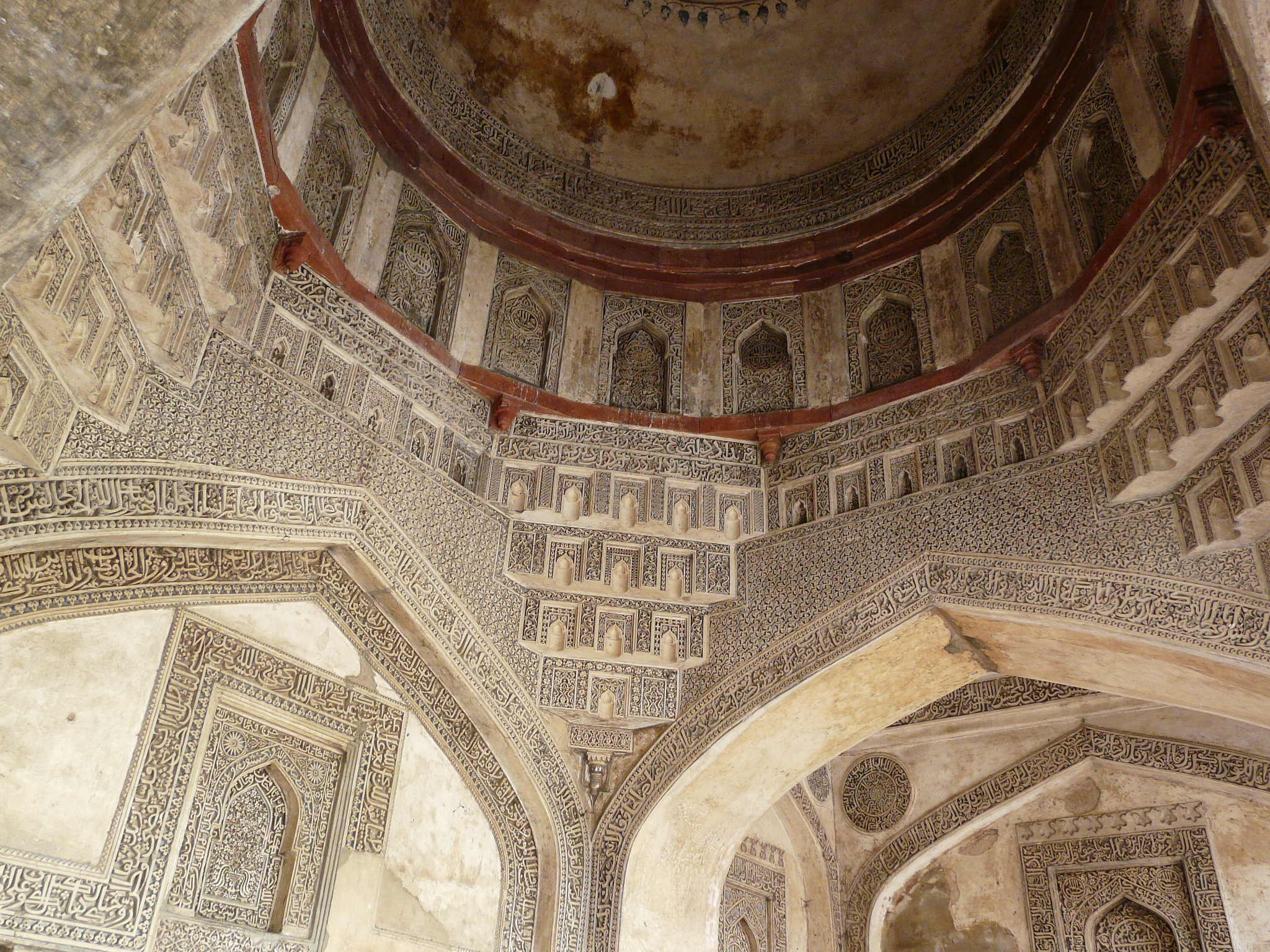
Bara Gumbad mosque central dome

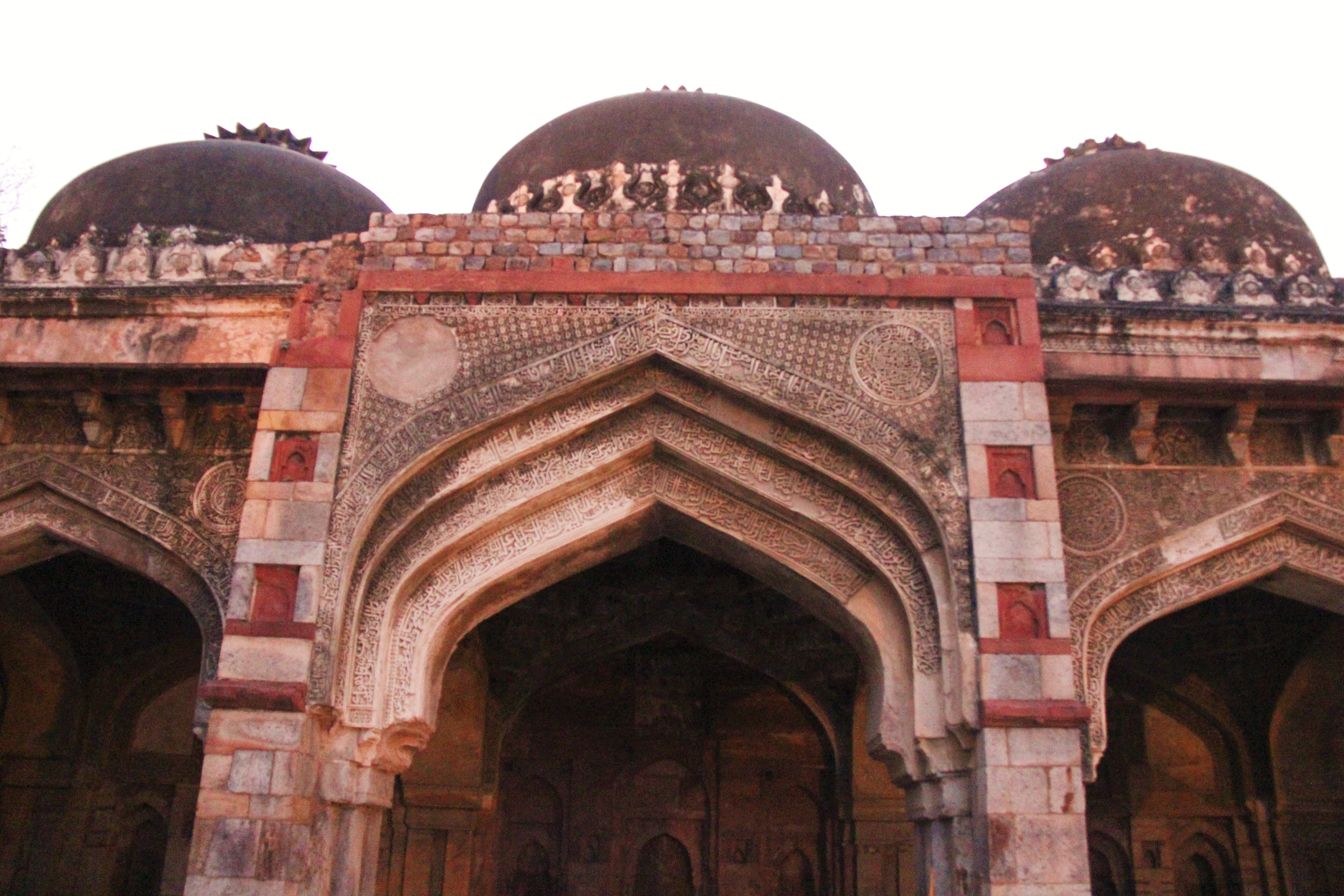
Bara Gumbad mosque

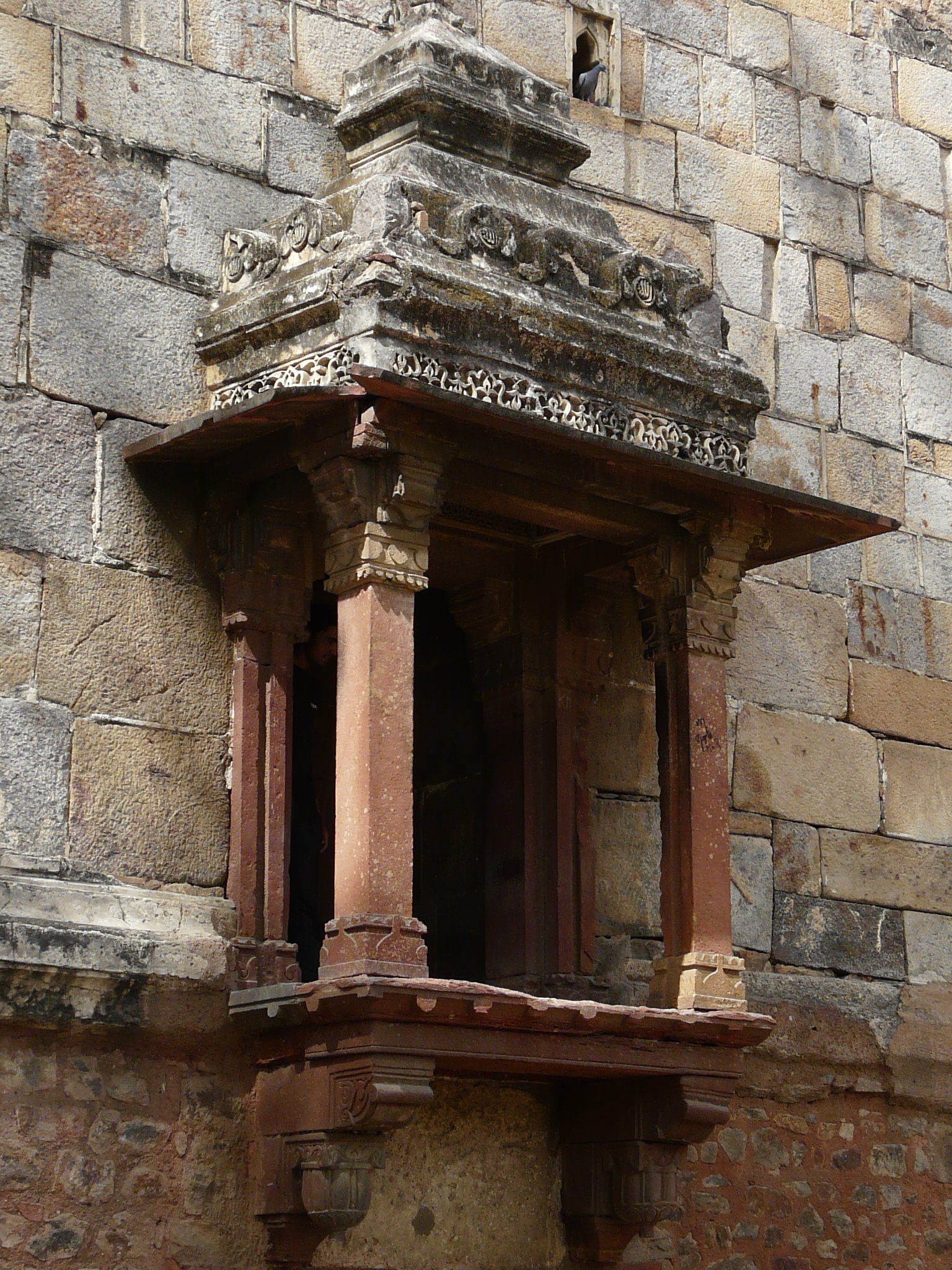
Side balcony of the mosque

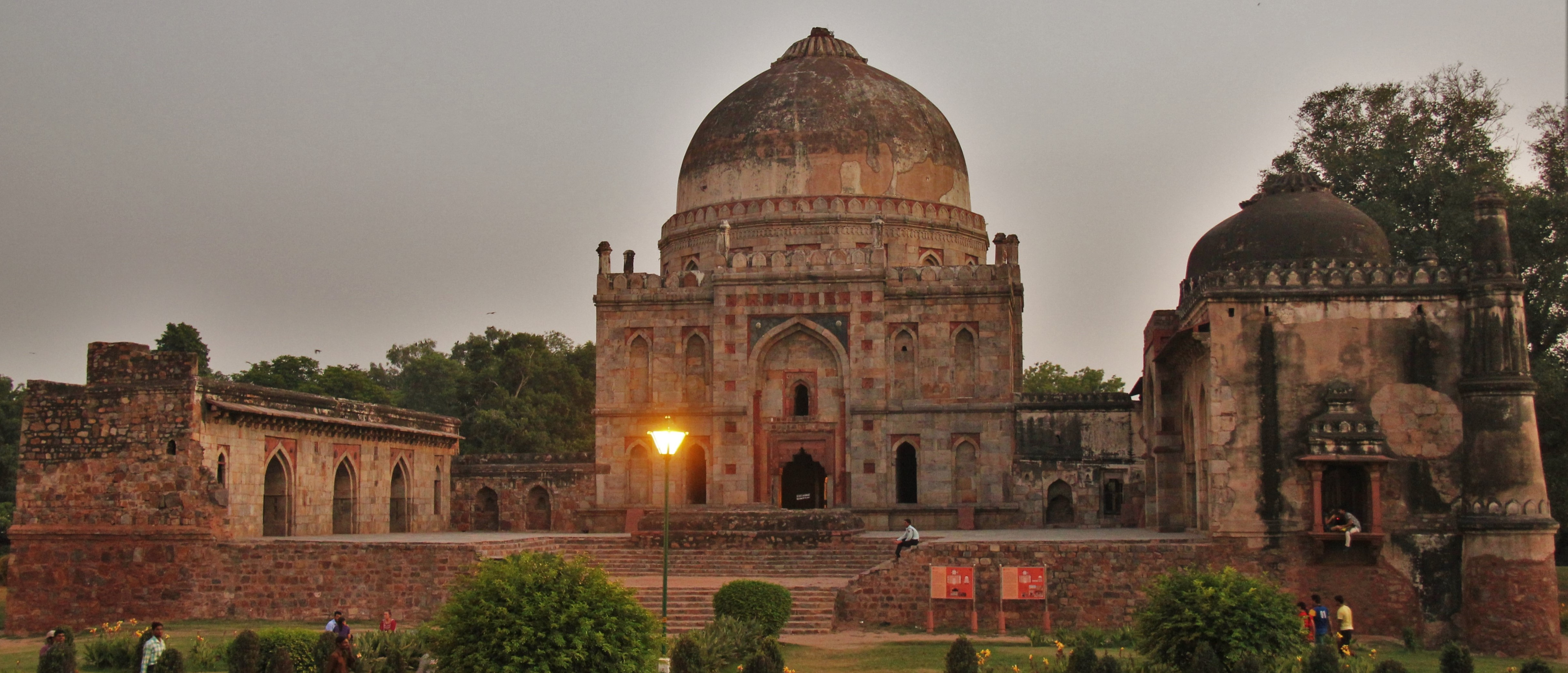
Bara Gumbad and mosque front view

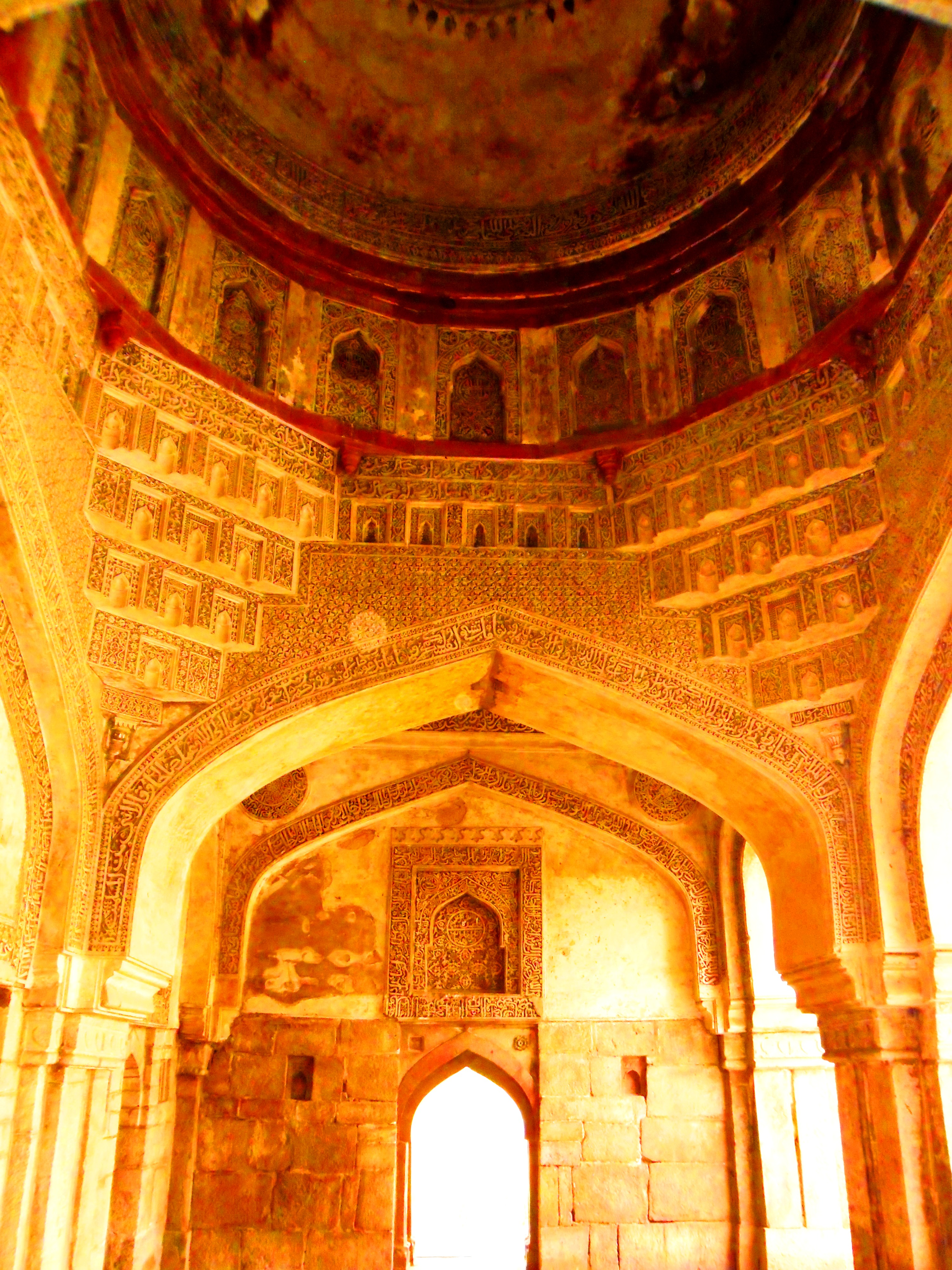
Interior view of the mosque

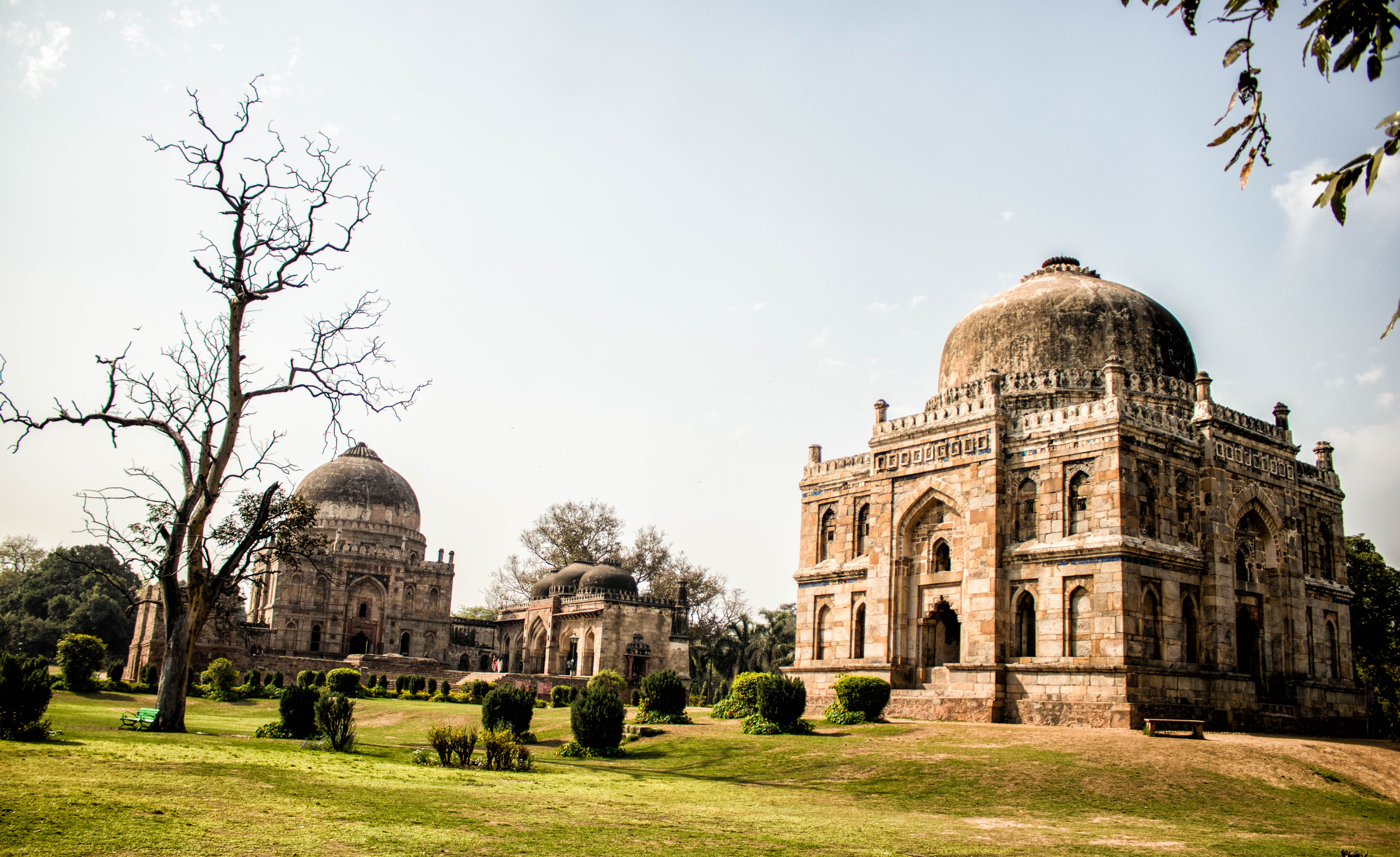
Bara Gumbad and mosque at back; Shisha Gumbad in front

== See also ==
- Islam in India
- List of mosques in India
- List of Monuments of National Importance in Delhi
