= Tomb of Ibrahim Lodi =

Enclosured Tomb of Afghan Sultan of Hindustan

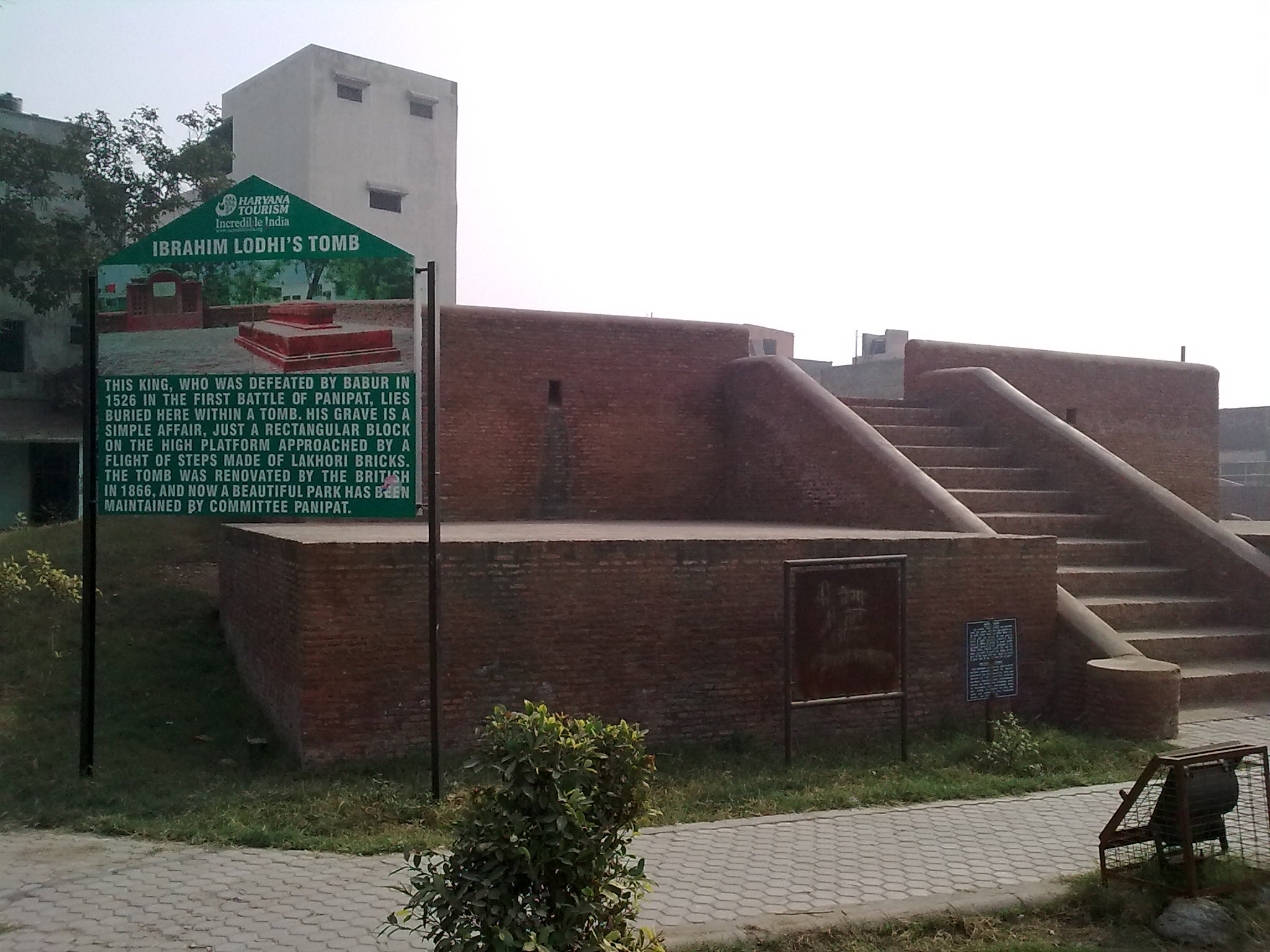

- Location within Haryana Location within India

General information
- Type: Tomb
- Architectural style: Indo-Islamic architecture
- Location: Tehsil office, Panipat, Haryana, India
- Coordinates: 29.39°N 76.97°E

The Tomb of Ibrahim Lodi in Panipat (Haryana, India) is the tomb of Ibrahim Lodi, Sultan of the Lodi dynasty.

== Tomb ==
Ibrahim Lodi's tomb is often mistaken to be the Shisha Gumbad within Lodi Gardens Delhi. Rather Ibrahim Lodi's tomb is actually situated near the tehsil office in Panipat, close to the Dargah of Sufi saint Bu Ali Shah Qalandar. It is a simple rectangular structure on a high platform approached by a flight of steps.

== History ==
Ibrahim Lodi became the Sultan of Delhi in 1517 after the death of his father Sikandar. He was the last ruler of the Lodi dynasty, reigning for nine years from 1517 until being defeated and killed at the battle of Panipat by Babur's invading army in 1526, giving way to the emergence of the Mughal Empire in India.

Ibrahim was an ethnic Pashtun. He attained the throne upon the death of his father, Sikandar, but did not possess the same ruling ability. He faced a number of rebellions. The Mewar ruler Rana Sangram Singh extended his empire right up to western Uttar Pradesh and threatened to attack Agra. There was rebellion in the East also. Ibrahim Lodi also displeased the nobility when he replaced old and senior commanders with younger ones who were loyal to him. His Afghan nobility eventually invited Babur to invade India, so that he could rule Delhi.

In 1526, the Mughal forces of Babur, the king of Kabulistan (Kabul, Afghanistan), defeated Ibrahim's much larger army in the Battle of Panipat. Ibrahim was killed during the battle at Panipat and his tomb now lies there. It is estimated that Babur's forces numbered around 25,000–30,000 men and had between 20 and 24 pieces of field artillery. Ibrahim Lodi had around 30,000–40,000 men along with at least 100 elephants.

== Restoration and relocation ==
In 1866, the British relocated the tomb during construction of the Grand Trunk Road and renovated it with an inscription highlighting Ibrahim Lodi's death in the Battle of Panipat.

Another memorial of some kind, however, appears to have existed which used to form a place of pilgrimage for the people of Gwalior since Vikramaditya the last Raja of the old dynasty of Gwalior, fell in the same battle. This memorial, according to Alexander Cunningham, was destroyed when the Grand Trunk Road was made.

== See also ==
- Tomb of Bahlol Lodi
- Tomb of Sikandar Lodi
- Panipat Places Of Interest
- Lodi Gardens in Delhi
- Humayun's Tomb at Delhi
- Pranpir Badshah tomb at Hisar
- Bu Ali Shah Qalandar at Panipat
- Sheikh Chilli's Tomb at Kurukshetra
- Khwaja Khizr Tomb at Sonipat
- Shah Zia Ud Din Muhammed's tomb at Naraingarh Ambala
- Sheikh Musa's tomb at Nuh
- Shah Nazm al Haq's tomb at Sohna
- Aga Khan Historic Cities Support Programme
