= Shish Gumbad =

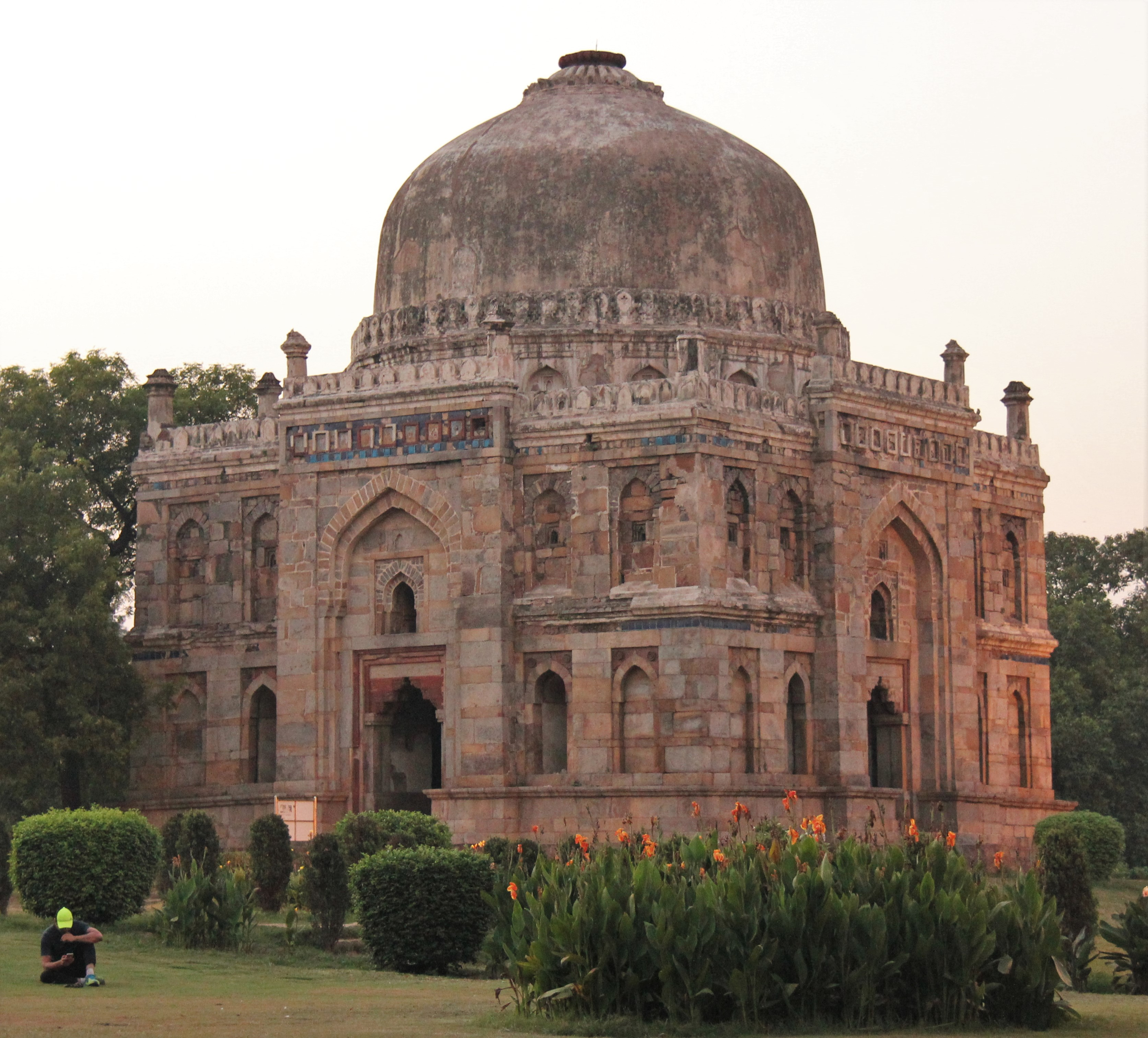
- Shish Gumbad at Lodi Gardens

- Location within Delhi
- 28°35′37.3884″N 77°13′12.6192″E
- Type: Tomb
- Location: Lodi Gardens

History
- Built: 1489-1517 CE

Site notes
- Architectural styles: Islamic & Hindu architecture
- Governing body: Archaeological Survey of India & NDMC
- Owner: Government of Delhi

Scheduled monument
- Official name: Shish Gumbad
- Designated: 9 Apr 1936
- Reference no.: N-DL-76

Shish Gumbad ("glazed dome"), also spelt Shisha Gumbad, is a tomb from the Lodi dynasty and is thought to have possibly been constructed between 1489 and 1517 CE; the historian Simon Digby has argued on the basis of an inscription in the adjoining mosque that it was completed in 1494 CE. The Shish Gumbad (glass dome) houses graves, whose occupants are not unequivocally identifiable. Historians have suggested, the structure might have been dedicated either to an unknown family, which was part of the Lodi family and of Sikandar Lodi's court, or to Bahlul Lodi (died 12 July 1489) himself, who was chief of the Afghan Lodi tribe, founder and Sultan of the Lodi dynasty of the Delhi Sultanate.

Shish Gumbad is situated in the Lodi Gardens in Delhi and the area where the tomb is situated was formally called village Khairpur.

== History ==
The exact date of construction of Shish Gumbad is not known. There are four monuments (tombs) in the Lodi Gardens including the Shish Gumbad. The oldest of the four tombs is the tomb of Muhammad Shah (who belonged to the Sayyid dynasty). Shah's tomb was constructed in 1444 CE by Ala-ud-din Alam Shah. During the rule of Sikander Lodi, the Bara Gumbad and adjacent mosque were constructed. Sikander Lodi's tomb was built by Ibrahim Lodi in 1517. The Shish Gumbad is said to have been constructed between 1489-1517 CE by Ibrahim Lodi.

Among historians there is no agreement on who the occupants of the graves inside the structure are. The Shish Gumbad might have been dedicated either to an unknown family, which was part of the Lodi family and of Sikandar Lodi's court, or to Bahlul Lodi (died 12 July 1489) himself, who was chief of the Afghan Lodi tribe, and founder and Sultan of the Lodi dynasty of the Delhi Sultanate.

Initially, all the monuments were built independently and were not in one confine. In early 20th century, a park was developed which was inaugurated by Lady Willingdon on 9 Apr 1936 bringing the four monuments in one confine.

== Construction ==
Constructed between 1489-1517 CE, the Shish Gumbad is constructed in a square shape. Using a combination of bracket and lintel beams, the architecture is a blend of Islamic and Indian architectures. Although the Gumbad has an external semblance of spanning two floors, the structure is in fact only one floor. The western wall of the Gumbad consists of mihrab which also served as a mosque. The main chamber of the monument measures 10 square metres (108 ft^{2}).

The ceiling is decorated with plaster work that contains Quranic inscriptions and floral designs. The monument was originally decorated with blue enamelled tiles that shined like glass. The Gumbad hence got its name "Shish Gumbad". The blue tile embellishment presently only remains on top of the main frontage in traces.

== Location ==
The Shish Gumbad is located in and is a part of the Lodi Gardens in Delhi, India. The village where the monument stands was previously called Khairpur. The garden is bounded by Amrita Shergill Marg in the West, North-West and North, Max Mueller Marg on the East and Lodi Road on the South Side. Safdarjang Tomb is situated on the South-West corner of the Lodi Garden.

== Picture gallery ==
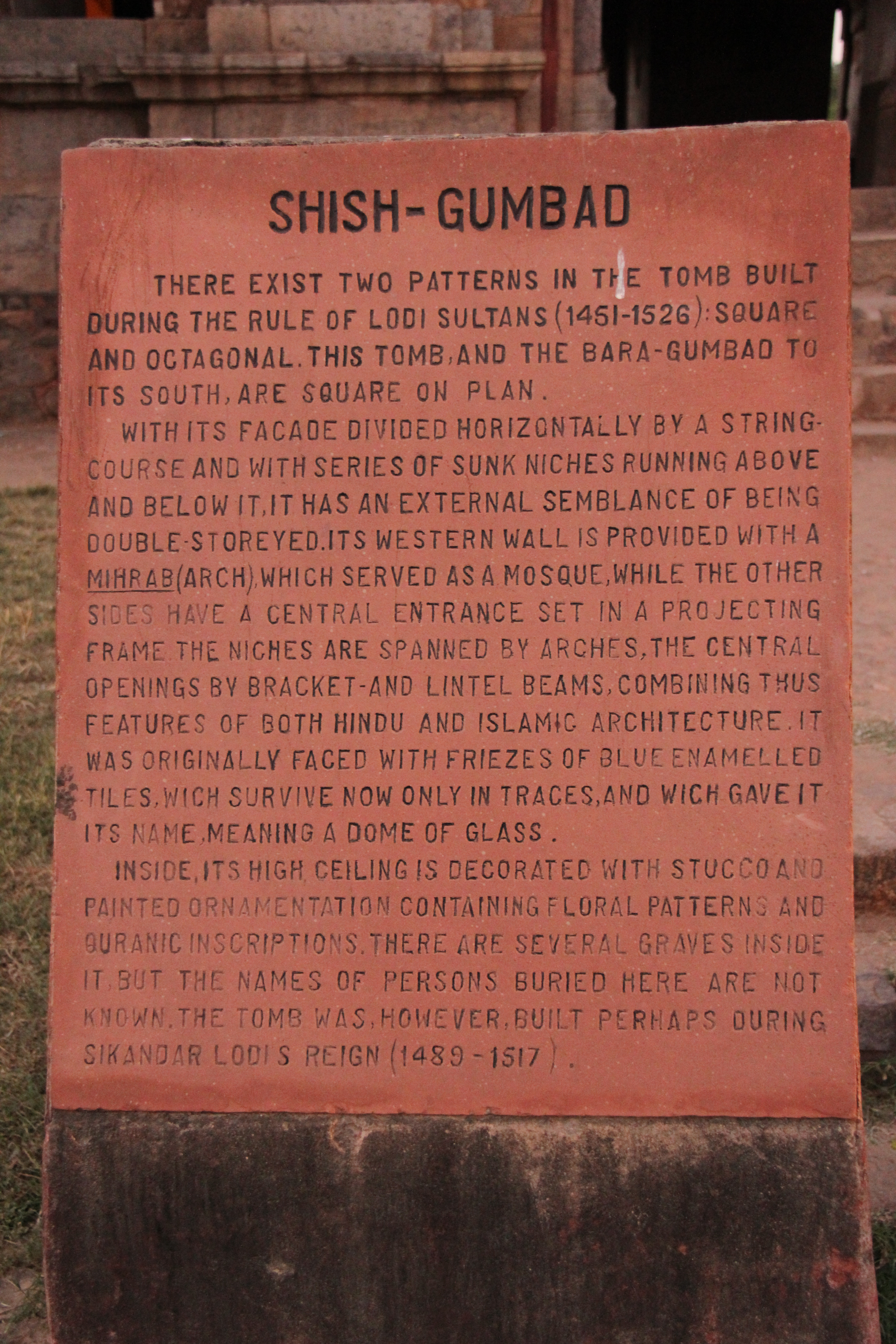
Monument information board displayed in Lodi gardens.

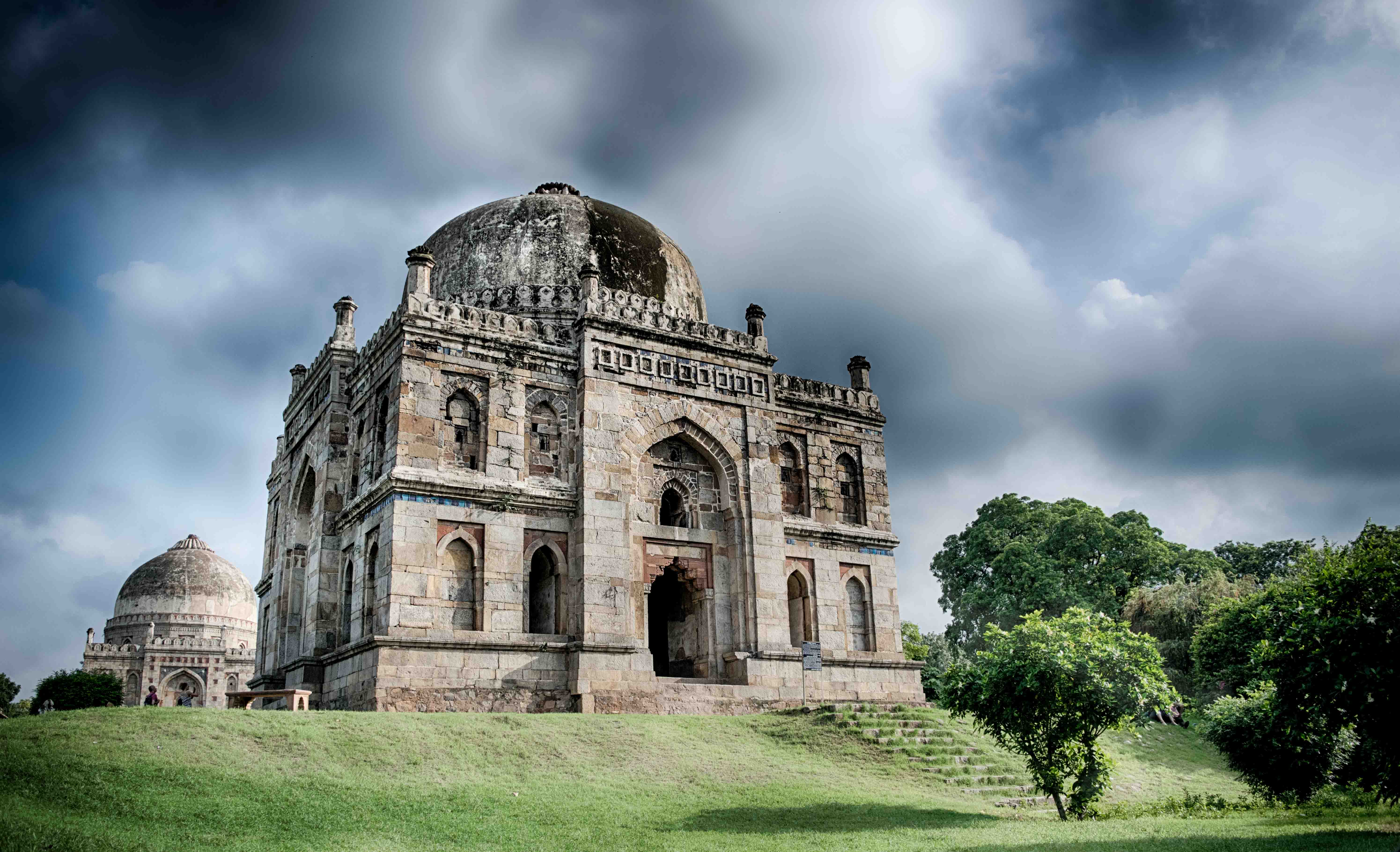
Rear view of Shish Gumbad

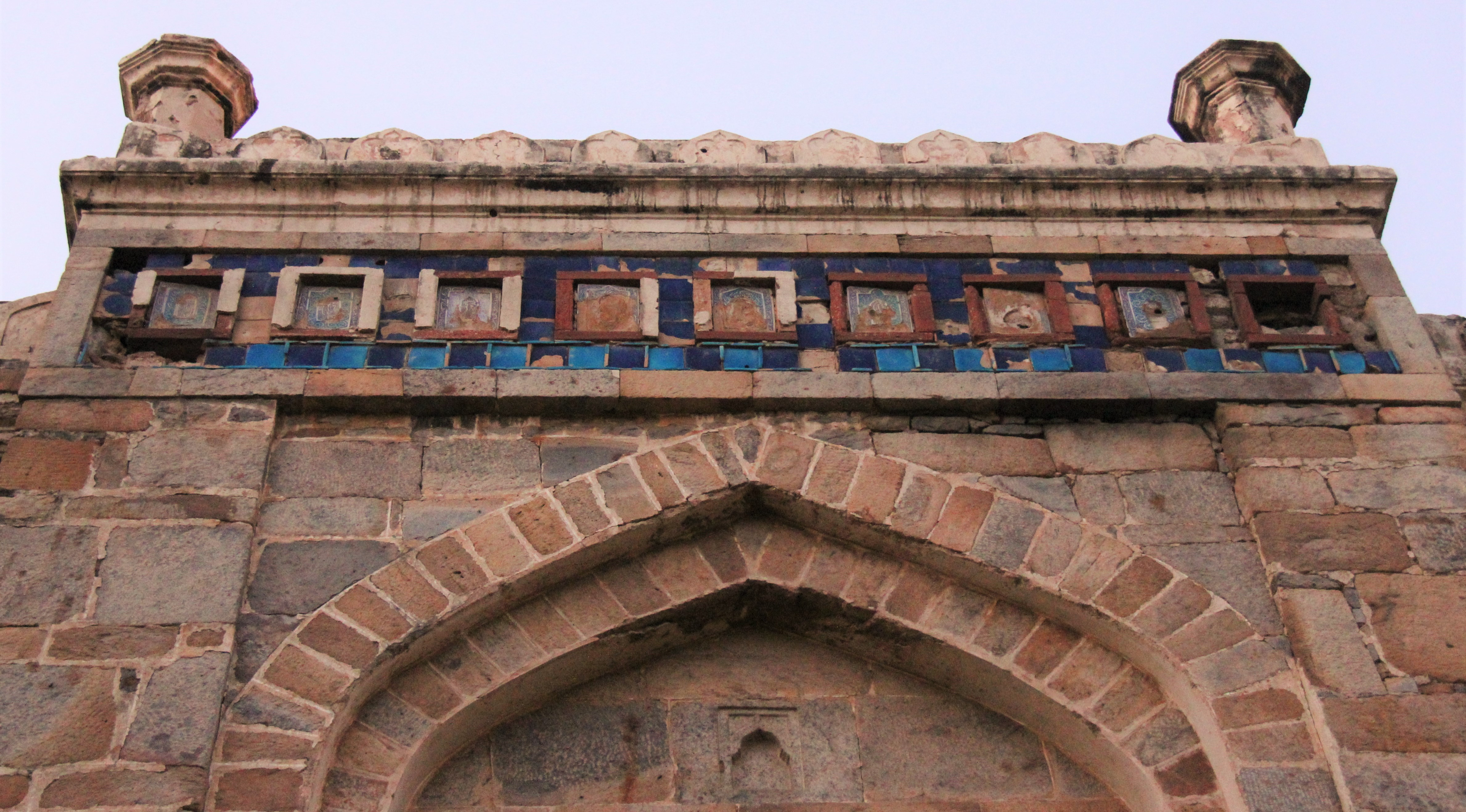
Tiles on top of main entrance

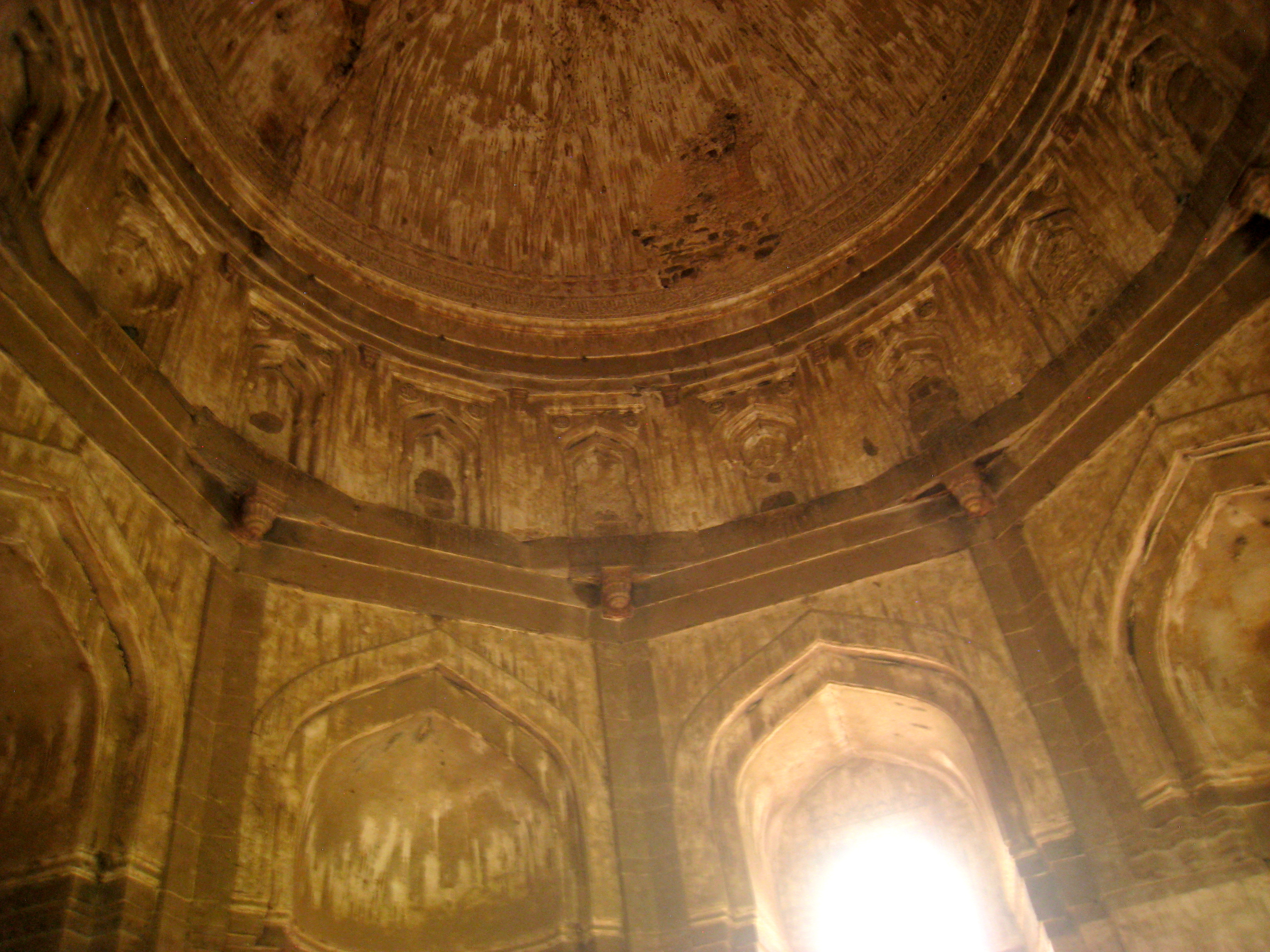
Dome interior ceiling

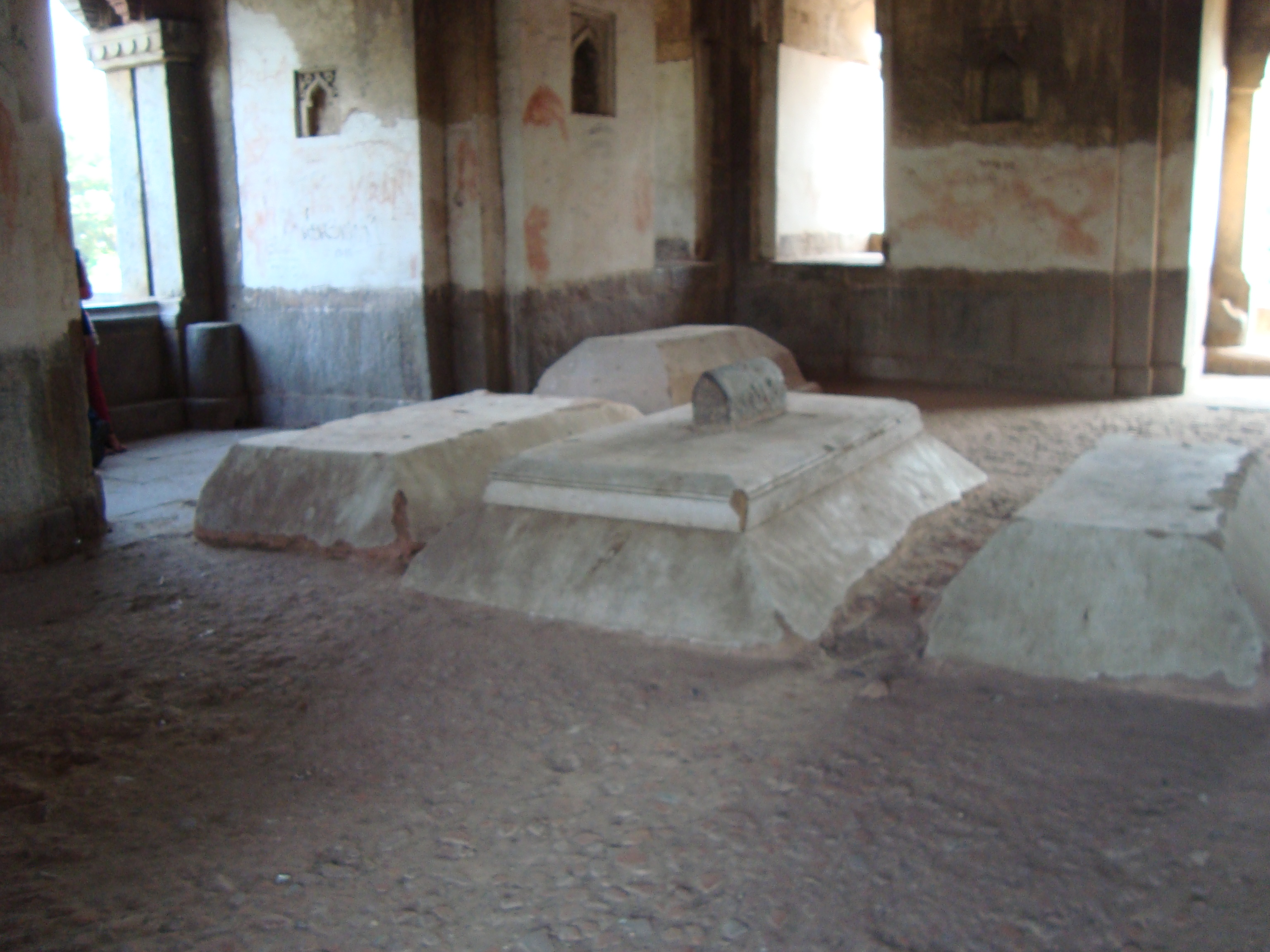
Graves in main chamber

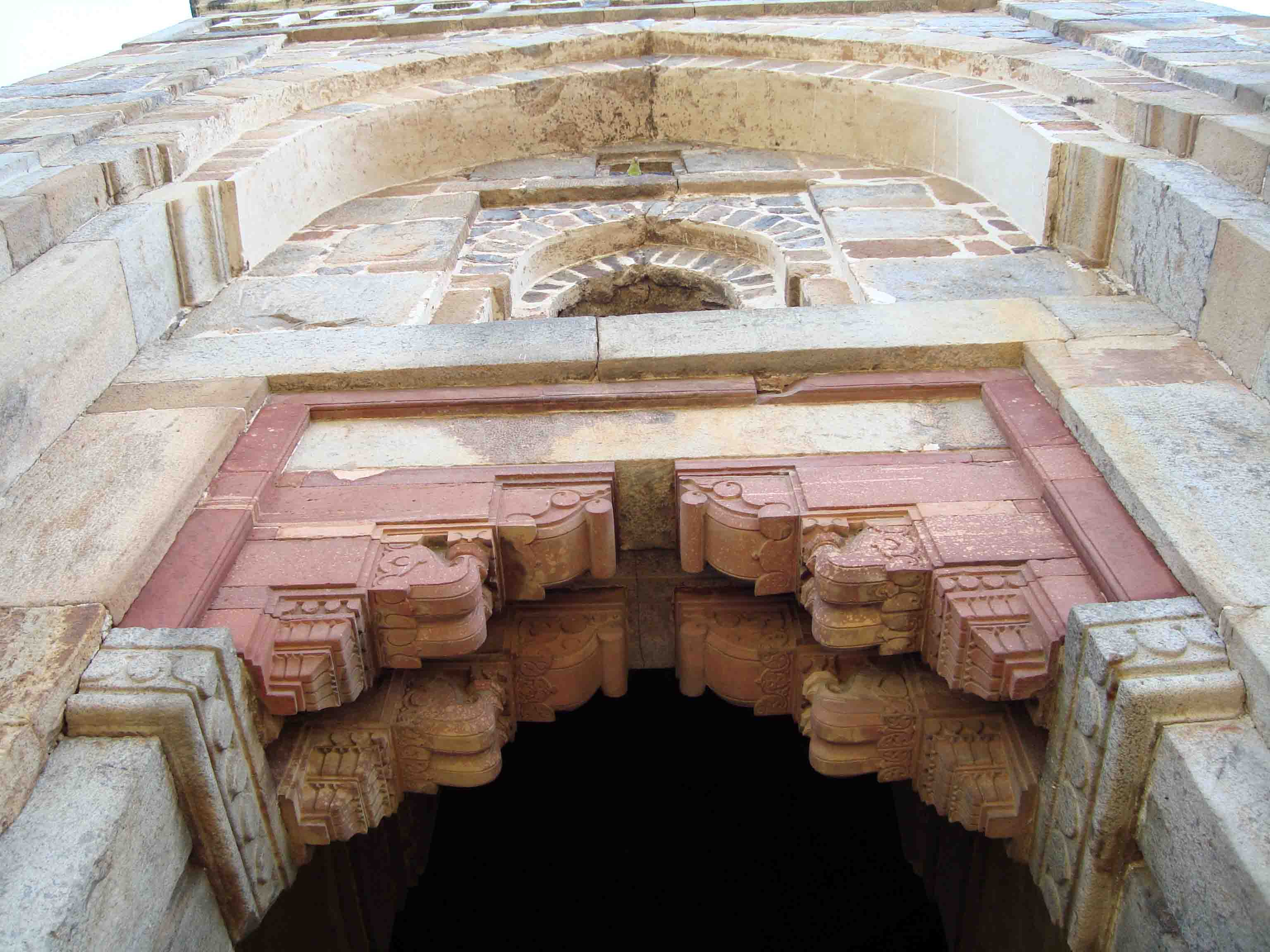
Carvings on South entrance

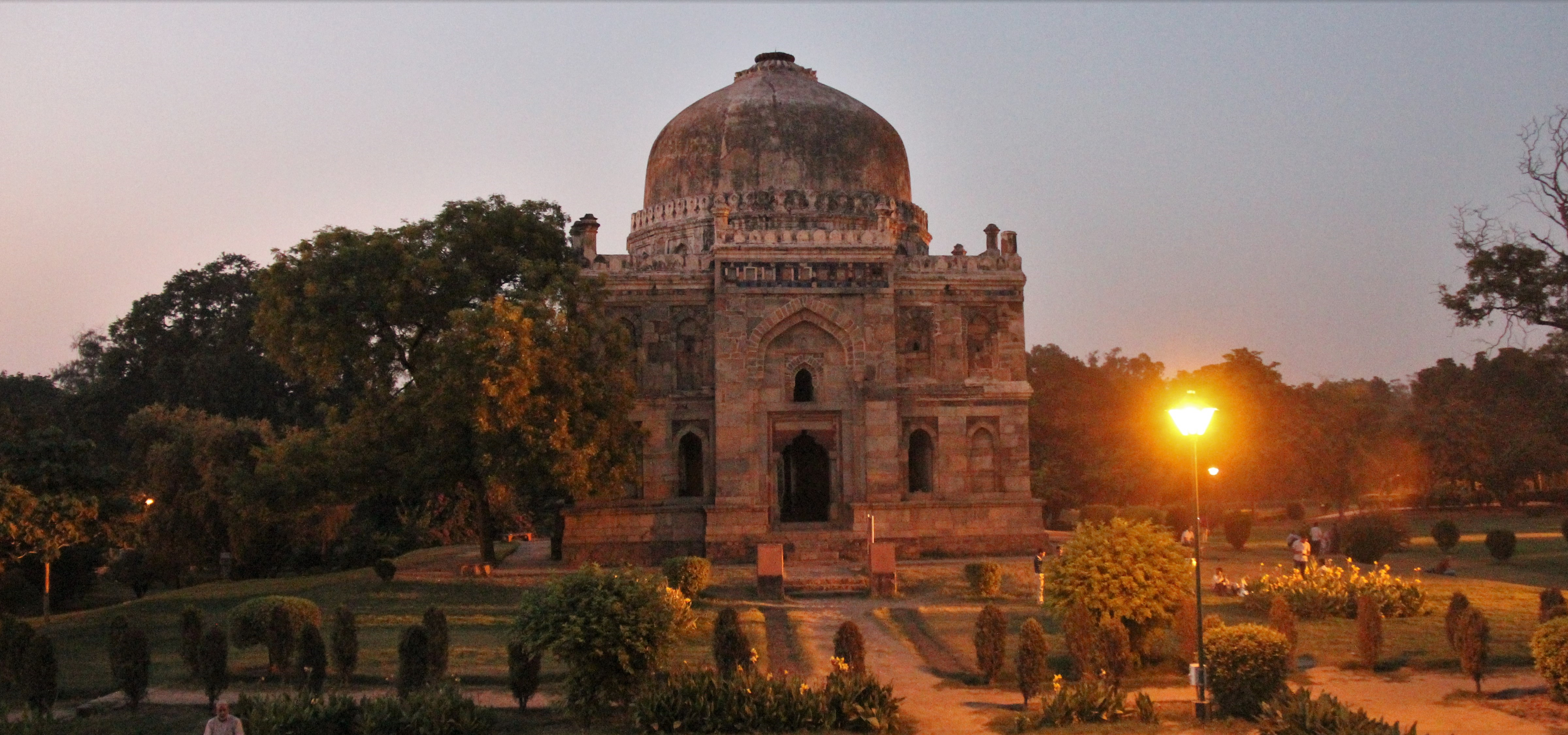
Shish Gumbad view from south (main entrance) side

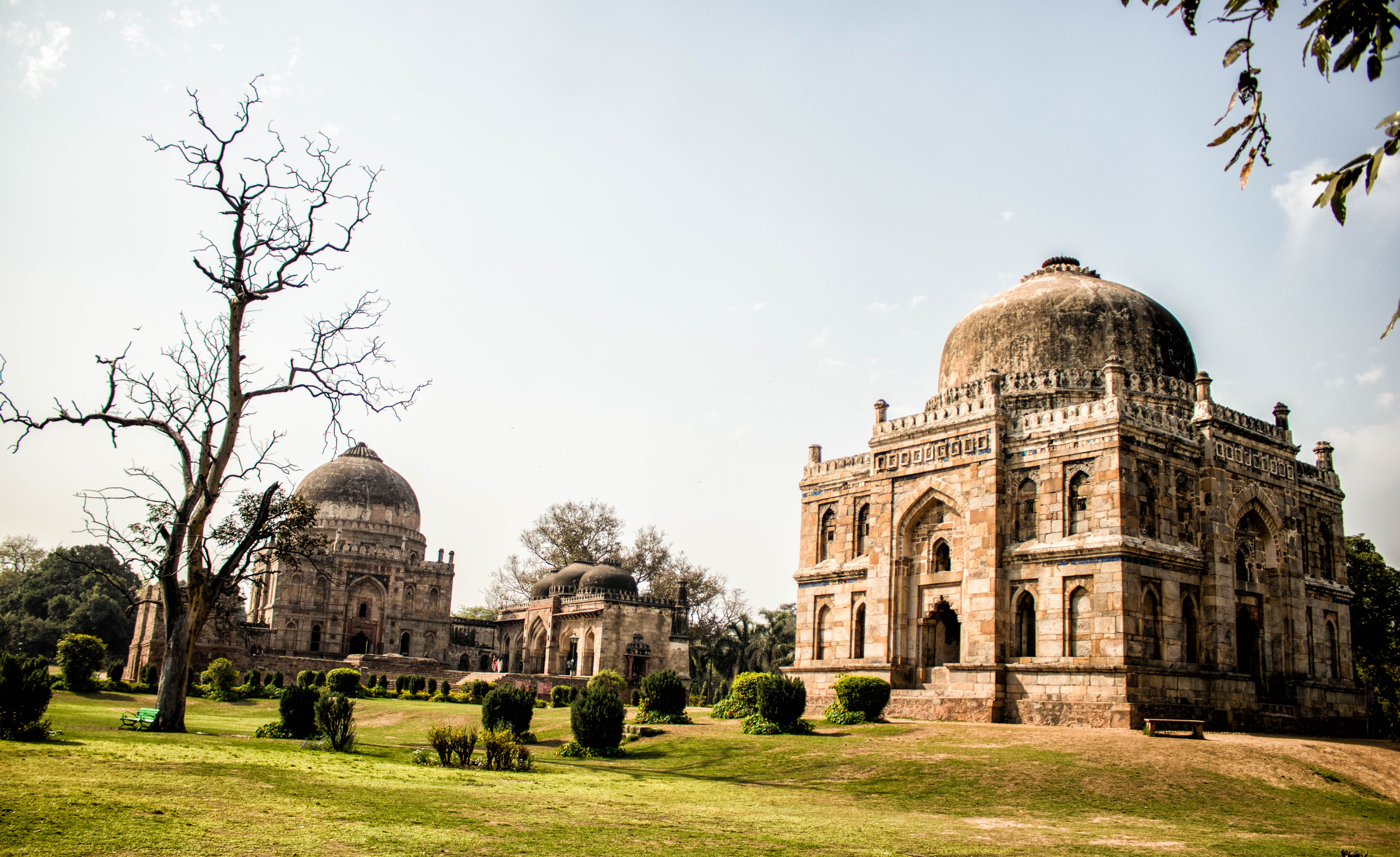
Bara Gumbad Shish Gumbad

== See also ==
- Bara Gumbad
- Lodi Gardens
- Tomb of Bahlol Lodi
- Tomb of Sikandar Lodi
- Ibrahim Lodi's Tomb
- List of Monuments of National Importance in Delhi
