= Ibrahim Khan Lodi =

Sultan of Delhi from 1517 to 1526

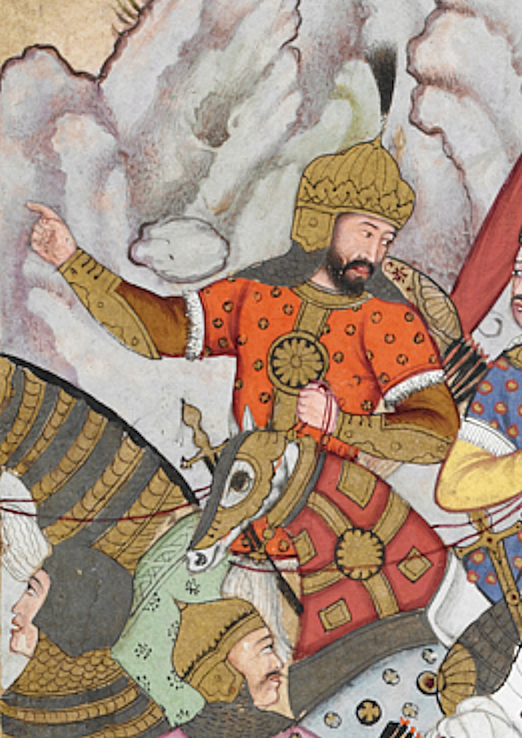
- Ibrahim Lodi during the Battle of Panipat as depicted in the Baburnama, c. 1590

31st Sultan of Delhi Lodi Emperor
- Reign: 21 November 1517 – 21 April 1526
- Coronation: 21 November 1517, Agra
- Predecessor: Sikandar Lodi
- Successor: Babur (as Mughal emperor)
- Born: c. 1480; Delhi, Delhi Sultanate
- Died: 21 April 1526 (aged 45–46); Panipat, Delhi Sultanate
- Burial: Tomb of Ibrahim Lodi
- Issue: Jalal Khan Lodi; A daughter (Note: Married Nusrat Shah of Bengal)
Regnal name
- Al-Mutawakkil Ala'l Rahman Al-Wathiq bil-Malik al-Multaji Abu'l Fath Ibrahim Shah bin Sikandar Shah al-Sultan (Note: المتوكل على الرحمن الواثق بالملک الملتجی ابو الفتح ابراہیم شاہ بن سکندر شاہ السلطان; lit. 'The one who relies in the Most Gracious, the one who trusts the King, the Refuged, the Father of Victory, Ibrahim Shah son of Sikandar Shah, the Sultan')
- House: Lodi
- Father: Sikandar Khan Lodi
- Religion: Sunni Islam

Ibrahim Khan Lodi (Pashto: ابراهیم خان لودی; 1480 – 21 April 1526) was the last Sultan of the Delhi Sultanate, who became Sultan in 1517 after the death of his father Sikandar Khan. He was the last ruler of the Lodi dynasty, reigning for nine years until 1526, when he was defeated and killed at the Battle of Panipat by Babur's invading army, giving way to the emergence of the Mughal Empire in India.

== Biography ==
After Sikandar Lodi's death in late 1517, his eldest son, Ibrahim Lodi, ascended the throne without opposition. Early in his reign, Ibrahim attempted a power‐sharing arrangement by installing his brother Jalal Khan as the autonomous governor of Jaunpur. But when Jalal began to assert his independence, Ibrahim—acting on the counsel of senior courtiers—reversed his decision. He summoned Jalal to Delhi; upon his refusal, Ibrahim secretly directed provincial governors and leading nobles to withhold recognition of Jalal's authority, forcing him to abandon Jaunpur and fall back to his former stronghold at Kalpi.

Undeterred, Jalal secured the backing of the influential noble Azam Humayun Sarwani and quickly seized Awadh. Yet, when Ibrahim advanced with a large force, Azam defected, re-pledging his loyalty to the Sultan and compelling Jalal to withdraw toward Agra. There, Ibrahim's general Malik Adam negotiated a temporary settlement: Jalal could keep Kalpi in return for renouncing any claim to independent rule. This truce proved short-lived.

Resolving to eliminate his brother once and for all, Ibrahim pursued Jalal across the region. Jalal fled first to Gwalior and took shelter from Vikramaditya Tomar and then into Malwa, eventually seeking refuge with the Gonds. Betrayed by his hosts, he was captured en route to Hansi and quietly executed on Ibrahim's orders.

Seizing on Jalal's revolt as a pretext, Ibrahim commissioned an expedition of 30,000 cavalry and 300 elephants—led by Azam Humayun Sarwani—to besiege Gwalior. After the fall of the Gwalior and taking control of its fortress in 1518 and the surrender of Vikramaditya Tomar, Ibrahim dispatched another army against Rana Sanga of Mewar, only to suffer defeat, marking a significant blow to his military reputation.

Jalal's uprising also deepened Ibrahim's mistrust of his own Afghan and Turkish nobles. He tightened court protocol to underscore his supremacy, arresting prominent figures such as Azam Humayun Sarwani and Mian Bhuwah. In retaliation, Islam Khan Sarwani—Azam's son—rallied some 40,000 men with support from leading Lodi chiefs, demanding his father's release. Ibrahim refused, even rebuffing an intercession by a respected saint, and crushed the rebellion in a bloody engagement that claimed around 10,000 lives and the death of Islam Khan.

Rather than moderate his approach, Ibrahim became more draconian. He had Mian Bhuwah executed, and Azam Humayun died in captivity under mysterious circumstances. Mian Husain Farmuli was murdered at Chanderi by Ibrahim's agents. Alarmed nobles in eastern provinces began fortifying their positions: on Darya Khan Lohani's death, his son Bahar Khan proclaimed independence and had the khutba read in his name, joined by Nasir Khan Lohani, Fath Khan, and Sher Khan Sur (later Sher Shah).

Meanwhile, Daulat Khan Lodi, governor of Punjab, secretly negotiated with Babur. After escaping Ibrahim's summons and witnessing the Sultan's harshness, Daulat Khan sent his son to Kabul to enlist Babur's support. At the same time, Ibrahim's uncle Alam Khan also sought Babur's aid. In 1524, Babur seized Lahore, routed Ibrahim's forces under Bahar Khan Lodi, and took control of the Punjab, though he refused to restore Daulat Khan to full power, prompting further realignments among Afghan leaders.

== Death ==
By early 1526, with his rivals fragmented, Babur launched a full-scale invasion of northern India. On 20 April 1526, at the First Battle of Panipat, Ibrahim Lodi's larger army was decisively defeated by Babur's innovative tactics and superior cavalry, leading to Ibrahim's death on the field and the end of Lodi rule in Delhi. Ibrahim Khan Lodi was defeated and killed on 21 April 1526 at the First Battle of Panipat, fought near Panipat (present-day Haryana, India), against the invading forces of Babur. His death marked the end of the Lodi dynasty and of the independent Delhi Sultanate, paving the way for the establishment of the Mughal Empire in India.

== Tomb ==
His tomb is often mistaken to be the Shisha Gumbad within Lodi Gardens, Delhi. Rather Ibrahim Khan Lodi's Tomb is actually situated near the tehsil office in Panipat, close to the Dargah of Sufi saint Bu Ali Shah Qalandar. It is a simple rectangular structure on a high platform approached by a flight of steps. In 1866, the British relocated the tomb during construction of the Grand Trunk Road and renovated it with an inscription highlighting Ibrahim Khan Lodi's death in the Battle of Panipat. He also built a Khwaja Khizr Tomb in Sonipat in 1522.

Another memorial of some kind, however, appears to have existed which used to form a place of pilgrimage for the people of Gwalior since Vikramaditya the last Raja of the Tomar dynasty of Gwalior, fell in the same battle. This memorial, according to Alexander Cunningham, was destroyed when the Grand Trunk Road was made.

== Gallery ==
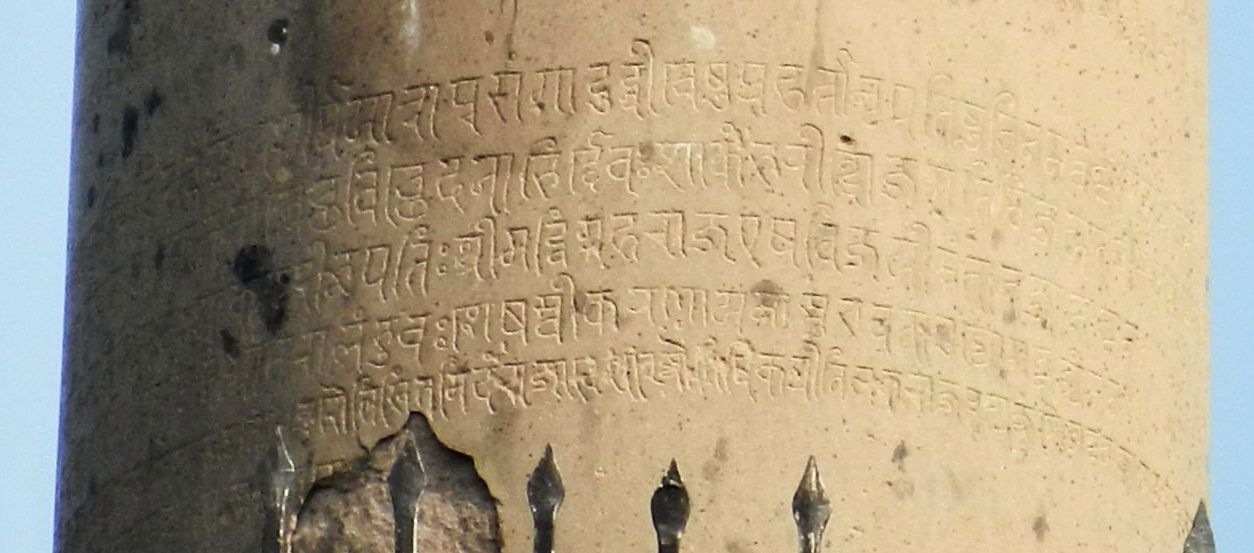
Delhi-Topra inscription of 1524 CE, mentioning Sultan Ibrahim Lodi.

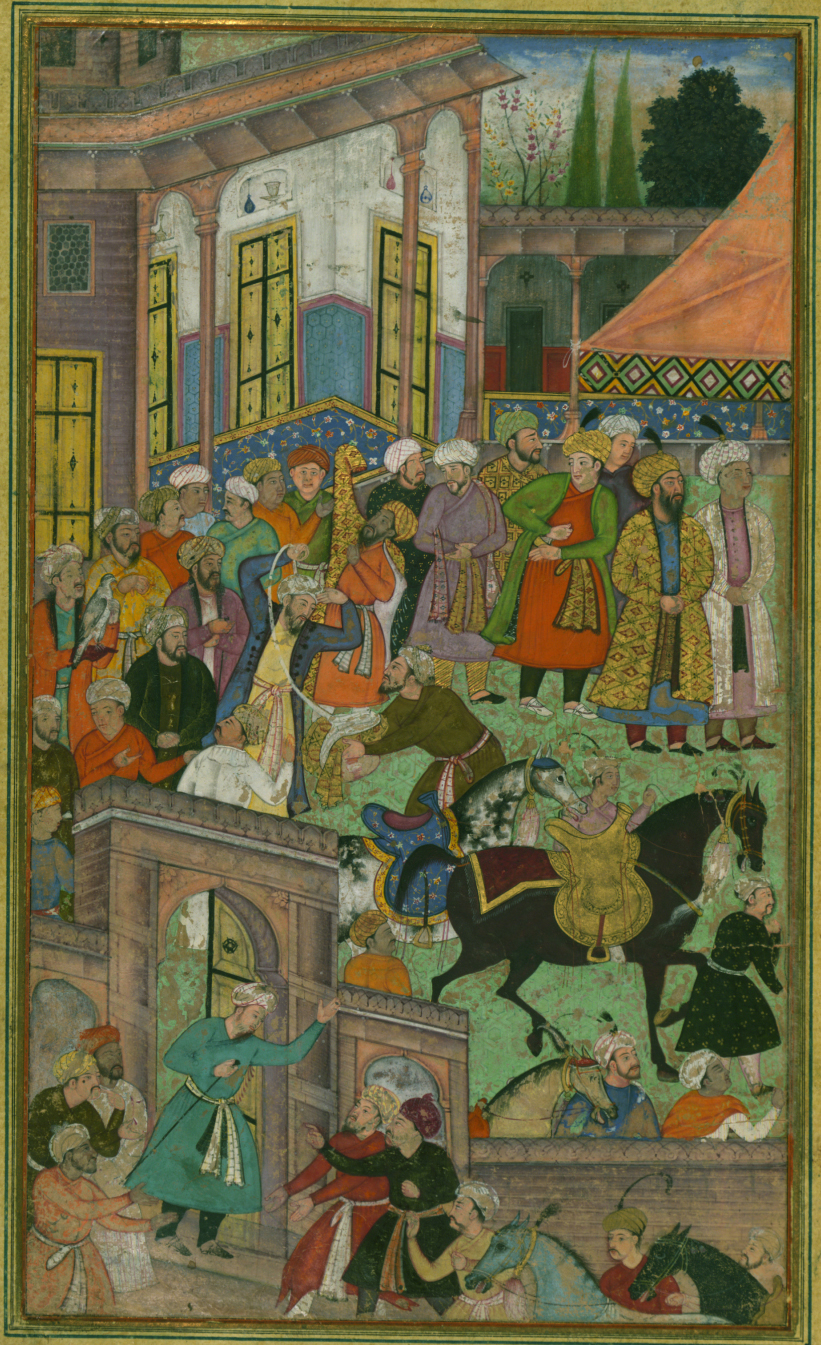
An awards ceremony in the Sultan Ibrahim Khan Lodi's court before being sent on an expedition to Sambhal

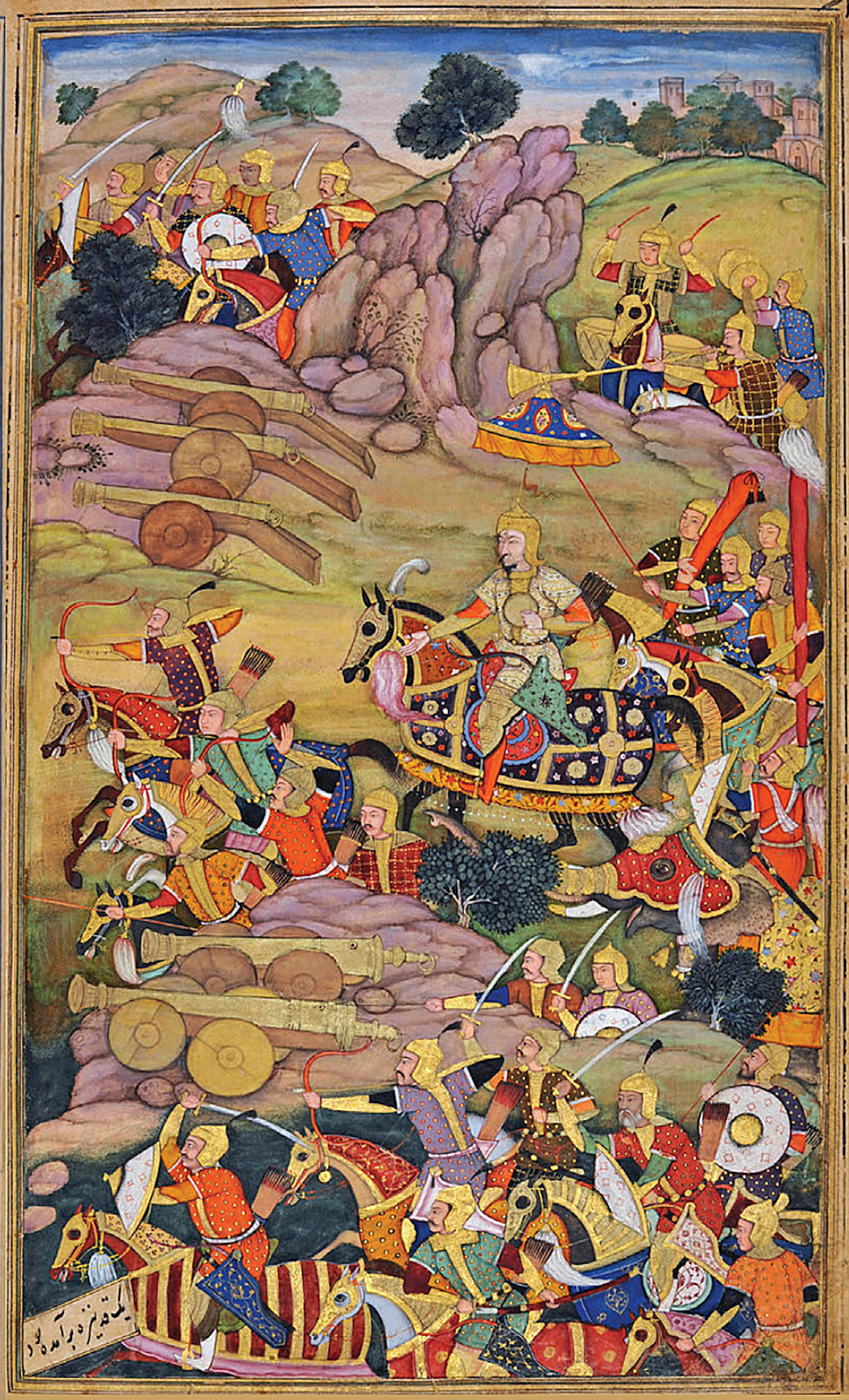
1526 – First Battle of Panipat-Ibrahim Khan Lodi and Babur

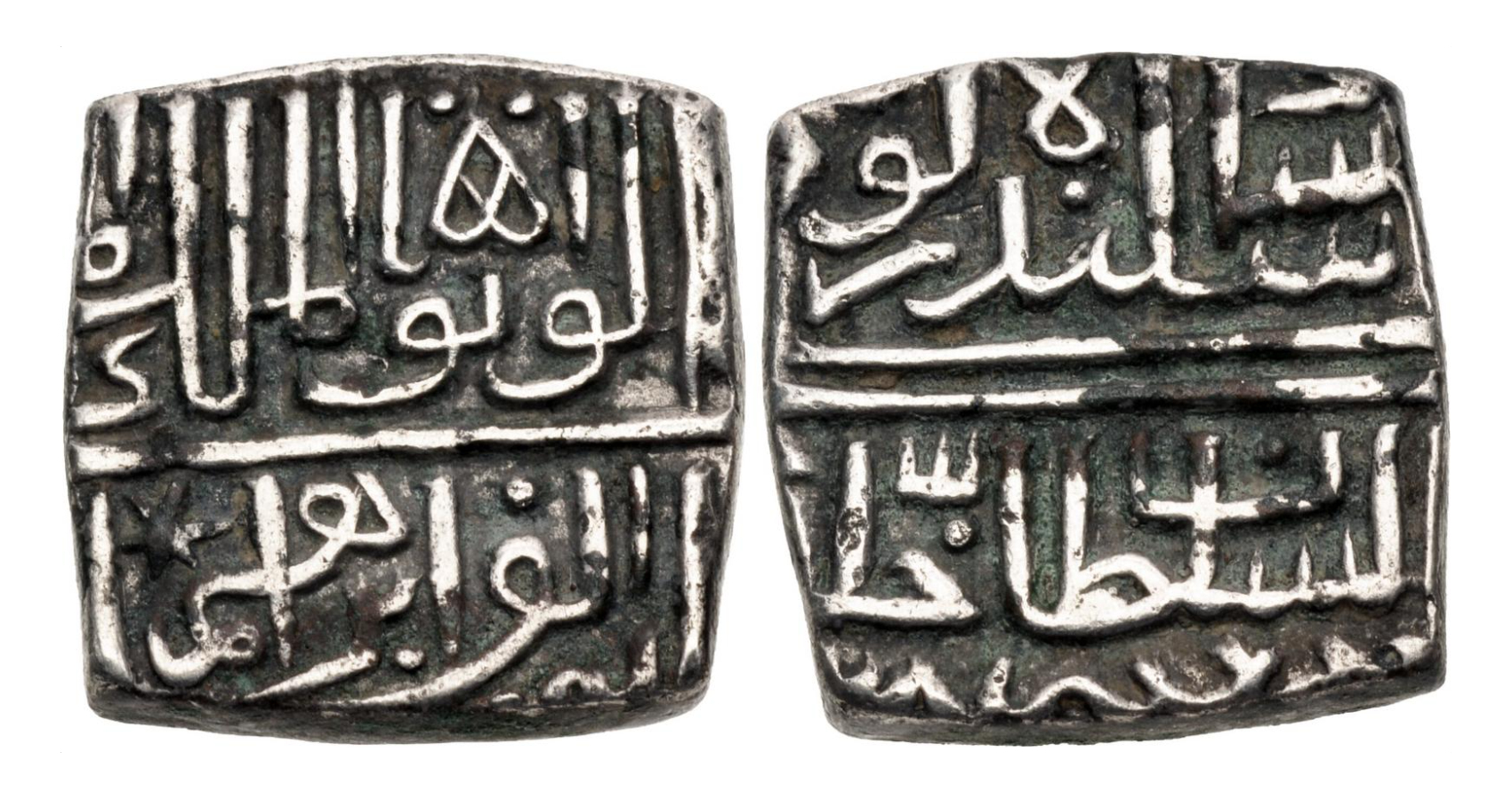
Coinage of Mahmud Shah II (1510–1531 CE) of the Malwa Sultanate, in the name of Ibrahim Lodi Sultan of Dehli, dated 1520–21 CE.

== See also ==
- Sher Shah Suri
- Tomb of Ibrahim Lodi
- Ibrahim Lodi's invasion of Ranthambore

== Notes ==
Regnal titles
Preceded by Sikandar Lodi	Sultan of Delhi; 1517–1526	Succeeded by Babur (Mughal Empire)
