= History of Bareilly =

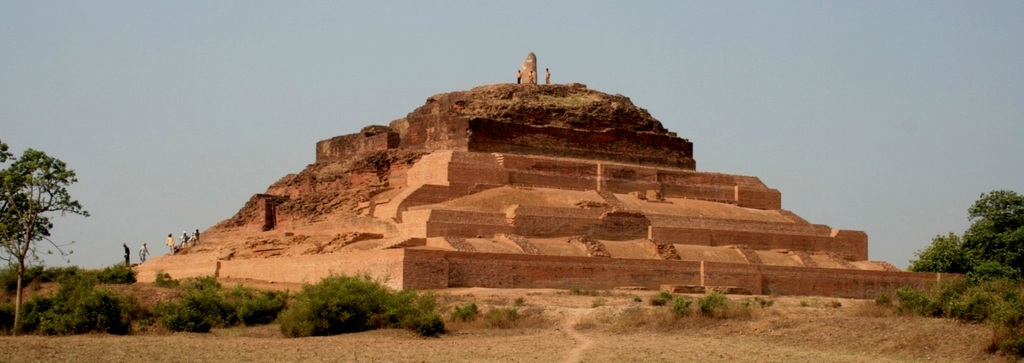
Ahichchhatra (or Ahi-Kshetra) was the ancient capital of Northern Panchala. The remains of this city has been discovered in Bareilly

According to the epic Mahābhārata, Bareilly region (Panchala) is said to be the birthplace of Draupadi, who was also referred to as 'Panchali' (one from the kingdom of Panchāla) by Kṛṣṇā (Lord Krishna). When Yudhishthira becomes the king of Hastinapura at the end of the Mahābhārata, Draupadi becomes his queen. The folklore says that Gautama Buddha had once visited the ancient fortress city of Ahicchattra in Bareilly. The Jain Tirthankara Parshva is said to have attained Kaivalya at Ahichhatra.

In the 12th century, the kingdom was under the rule by Katheriya Rajputs . Muslim Turkic dynasties the region became a part of the Delhi Sultanate before getting absorbed in the emerging Mughal Empire. The foundation of the City of Bareilly was laid by Jagat singh Katehriya. His two sons were responsible for finding bareilly Bans deo and Barel deo. Later a mughal general Mukund rai ruled here in mughal period in 1647.

Later the region became the capital of Rohilkhand region before getting handed over to Nawab Vazir of Awadh and then to East India Company (transferred to the British India) and later becoming an integral part of India. The region has, also, acted as a mint for a major part of its history.

From archaeological point of view the district of Bareilly is very rich. The extensive remains of Ahichhatra, the Capital town of Northern Panchala have been discovered near Ramnagar village of Aonla Tehsil in the district. It was during the first excavations at Ahichhatra (1940–44) that the painted grey ware, associated with the advent of the Aryans in the Ganges–Yamuna Valley, was recognised for the first time in the earliest levels of the site. Nearly five thousand coins belonging to periods earlier than that of Guptas have been yielded from Ahichhatra. It has also been one of the richest sites in India from the point of view of the total yield of terracotta. Some of the masterpieces of Indian terracotta art are from Ahichhatra. In fact the classification made of the terracotta human figurines from Ahichhatra on grounds of style and to some extent stratigraphy became a model for determining the stratigraphy of subsequent excavations at other sites in the Ganges Valley. On the basis of the existing material, the archaeology of the region helps us to get an idea of the cultural sequence from the beginning of the 2nd millennium BC up to the 11th century AD. Some ancient mounds in the district have also been discovered by the Deptt. of Ancient History and culture, Rohilkhand University, at Tihar-Khera (Fatehganj West), Pachaumi, Rahtuia, Kadarganj and Sainthal.

== Historical Empire ==
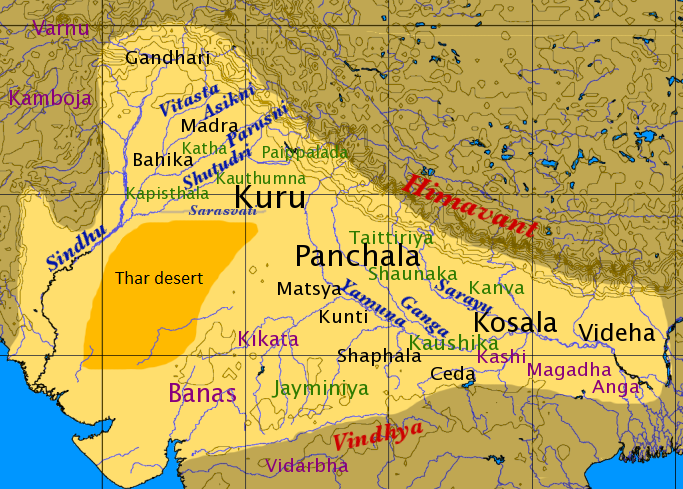
The position of the Panchala kingdom in Iron Age Vedic India.

Historically, Bareilly region was the capital of the ancient Kingdom of Uttara-Panchala (Northern Panchala). The ancient fortress city of Ahicchattra in Bareilly served as a seat of the influential Empire.

The Kingdom occupied the country (region) to the east of the Kuru Kingdom, i.e. between the upper Himalayas and the river Ganges. The country was divided into Uttara-Panchala (Northern Panchala) and Dakshina-Panchala (Southern Panchala).

The Uttara-Panchala (Northern Panchala) had its capital at Ahicchattra (also known as Adhichhatra and Chhatravati, near present-day Ramnagar village in Aonla region of Bareilly, while Dakshina-Panchala (Southern Panchala) had it capital at Kampilya or Kampil in Farrukhabad district.

The names of the last two Panchala clans, the Somakas and the Srinjayas are also mentioned in the Mahabharata and the Puranas. King Drupada, whose daughter Draupadi was married to the Pandavas belonged to the Somaka clan. However, the Mahabharata and the Puranas consider the ruling clan of the northern Panchala as an offshoot of the Bharata clan and Divodasa, Sudas, Srinjaya, Somaka and Drupada (also called Yajnasena) were the most notable rulers of this clan. The Kshatriya Nairs - it is believed, belonged to the Yajnasena clan and migrated from Ahi-Kshetra to Kerala, via Shimoga and Tulunadu.

== Rule of Nanda, Maurya, Gupta and Maukharis Empire ==
The experiment in non-monarchical form of Government in Panchala was soon engulfed in the growing Magadhen imperialism - first under the Nandas and then under the Mauryas. The fall of the Mauryan empire saw the emergence of multiple small and independent states in the whole Ganges Valley. It saw a remarkable revival in the fortunes of Panchala which once again came to occupy a very significant position in the history of north India.

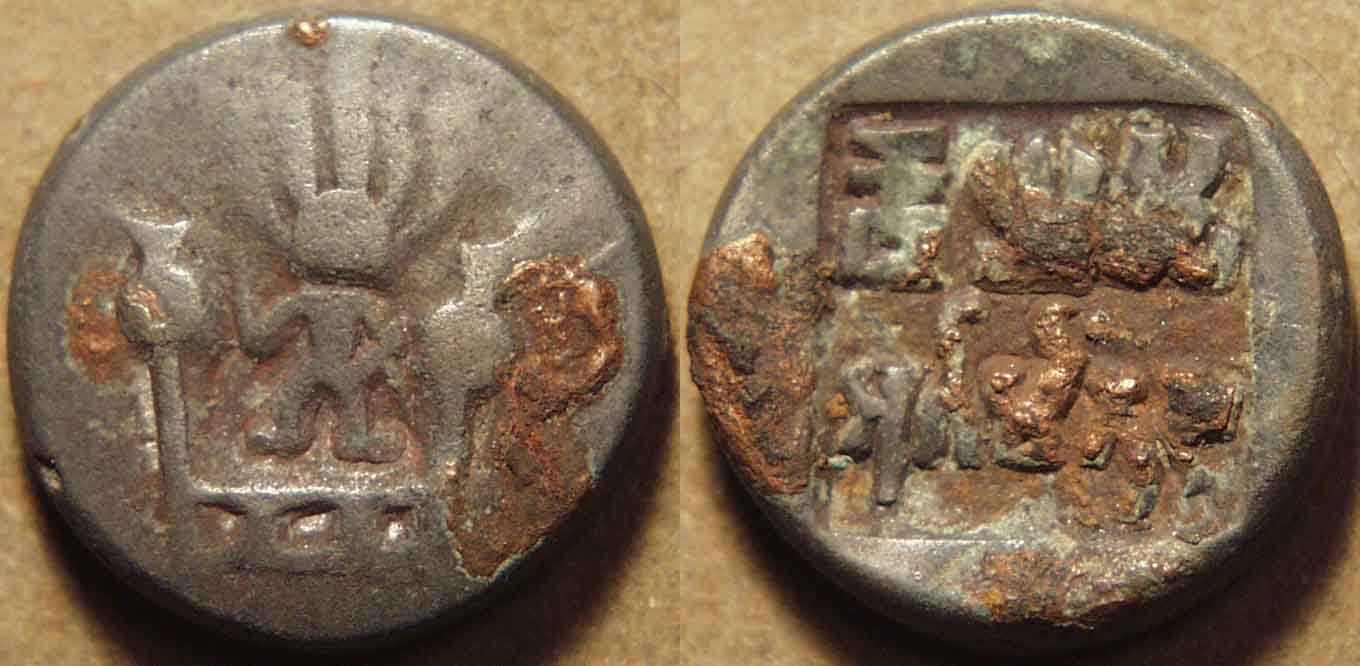
Coin of Agnimitra, showing the depiction of Agni with flaming hair on the obverse, and a reverse showing the three dynastic symbols of the Panchala rulers and a legend naming the king: Agimitasa.

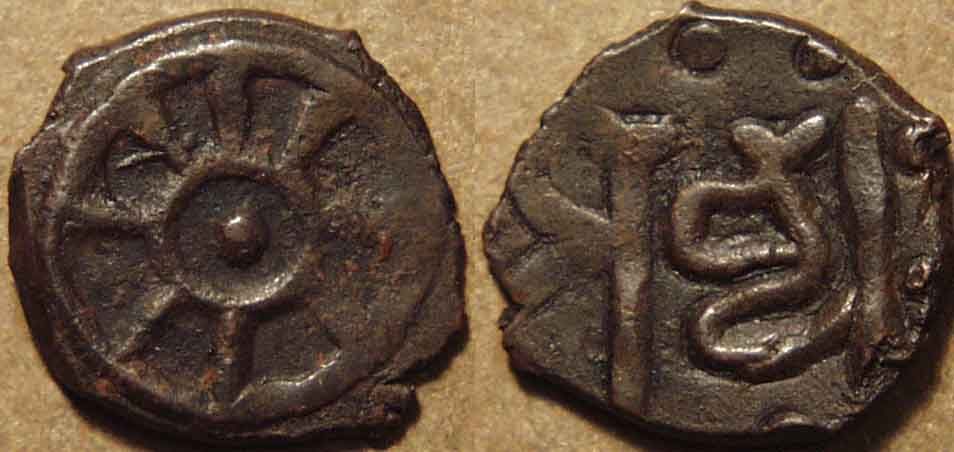
Coin of Achyuta, the last Panchala king, showing an 8-spoked wheel and the king's name: Achyu.

Panchala emerges at this time as one of the strongest powers in India. About 25 kings who have ruled during this period have left behind thousands of coins. During the period between the fall of the Mauryas and the rise of the Guptas, the Panchalas had two phases of power - first the pre Kushana phase i.e. from C-150 BC to AD 125 and secondly a short period of fifty years after the fall of the Kushanas, which ended in CAD 350 when Panchala was assimilated in the Gupta empire by Samudragupta. Under the Guptas Ahichhatra was one of the provinces into which the Gupta empire was divided.

Evidence reveal that the Panchal coins were minted at Bareilly and the surrounding areas during 176 - 166 BC. Kushan and Gupta kings established mints in the region and this status was retained until the Christian era. Found at Ganga Ghati in abundance were the Adi Vigraha and Shree Vigraha coins of the Pratihara Kings that were minted here between the 4th and 9th centuries. Dating to this period are also the silver coins – similar to those of Firoz Second – known as Indo-Sasanian. Later, the city's continued status as a Mint town since the beginning of the Christian era was helped by the fact that Bareilly was never a disturbed area. (except at the time of the Independence Struggle)

The amalgamation of several religious and popular beliefs may be observed throughout the history of Panchala in ancient India. In addition to being associated with the activities of Pravahana Jaivali, Gargayayana, Uddalaka etc. responsible for giving a distinctive touch to the later vedic thought, the region was also a prominent centre of popular beliefs such as the cult of Nagas, Yaksas and Vetalas.

After the fall of the Guptas in the latter half of the 6th century the district of Bareilly came under the domination of the Maukharis. Under the Emperor Harsha (r. 606 - 647 AD) the district was the part of the Ahichhatra Bhukti.

== Rise of Buddhism and Jainism ==
In the 6th century BC, the Panchala was one of the sixteen mehajanapadas of India. The city was also influenced by Buddha and his followers. The remains of Buddhist monasteries at Ahichhatra are quite extensive. The folklore says that Gautama Buddha had once visited the ancient fortress city of Ahicchattra in Bareilly.

The Jain Tirthankara Parshva is said to have attained Kaivalya at Ahichhatra. The echoes of the Bhagavates and the Saivas at Ahichhatrra can still be seen in the towering monuments of a massive temples, which is the most imposing structure of the site.

During Harsha's reign the Chinese pilgrim Hiuen Tsang also visited Ahichhatra about 635 AD.

== Period of anarchy and Muslim dynasties ==
After the death of Harsha this region falls under anarchy and confusion. In the second quarter of 8th century the district was included in the kingdom of Yashavarman (725 - 52 AD) of Kannauj and after him the Ayudha kings also Kannauj became the masters of the district for several decades. With the rise of the power of the Gurjara Pratiharas in the 9th century, Bareilly came under their sway. It continued under their subordination until the end of the 10th century.

Sultan Mahmud Ghaznavi gave a death blow to the already decaying Gurjara Pretihara power. After the fall of the Gurjara Pretiharas Ahichhetra ceases to remain a flourishing cultural centre of the region. The seat of the royal power was shifted from Ahichhatra to Vodamayuta or modern Badaun as the irrefutable evidence of Rashtrakuta Chief Lakhanpalas inscription shows.

== Chamkandi ==
After the fall of the Gurjara Pretihara, the city was under the rule of local rulers.

== Under rule of Delhi Sultanate and Mughal rule ==
This move by Mughal emperor Aurangzeb Alamgir was aimed to suppress Rajput uprisings, which had afflicted this region. Originally, some 20,000 soldiers from various Pashtun tribes ( Yusafzais, Ghoris, Lodis, Ghilzai, Barech, Marwat, Durrani, Tanoli, Tarin, Kakar, Khattak, Afridi and Baqarzai ) were hired by Mughals to provide soldiers to the Mughal armies and this was appreciated by Aurangzeb Alamgir, an additional force of 25,000 men was given respected positions in Mughal Army. However most of them settled in the Katehar region during Nadir Shah's invasion of northern India in 1739 increasing their population up to 100,0000. Due to the large settlement of Rohilla Afghans, the Katehar region gained fame as Rohilkhand.

== Establishment of Rohilkhand ==
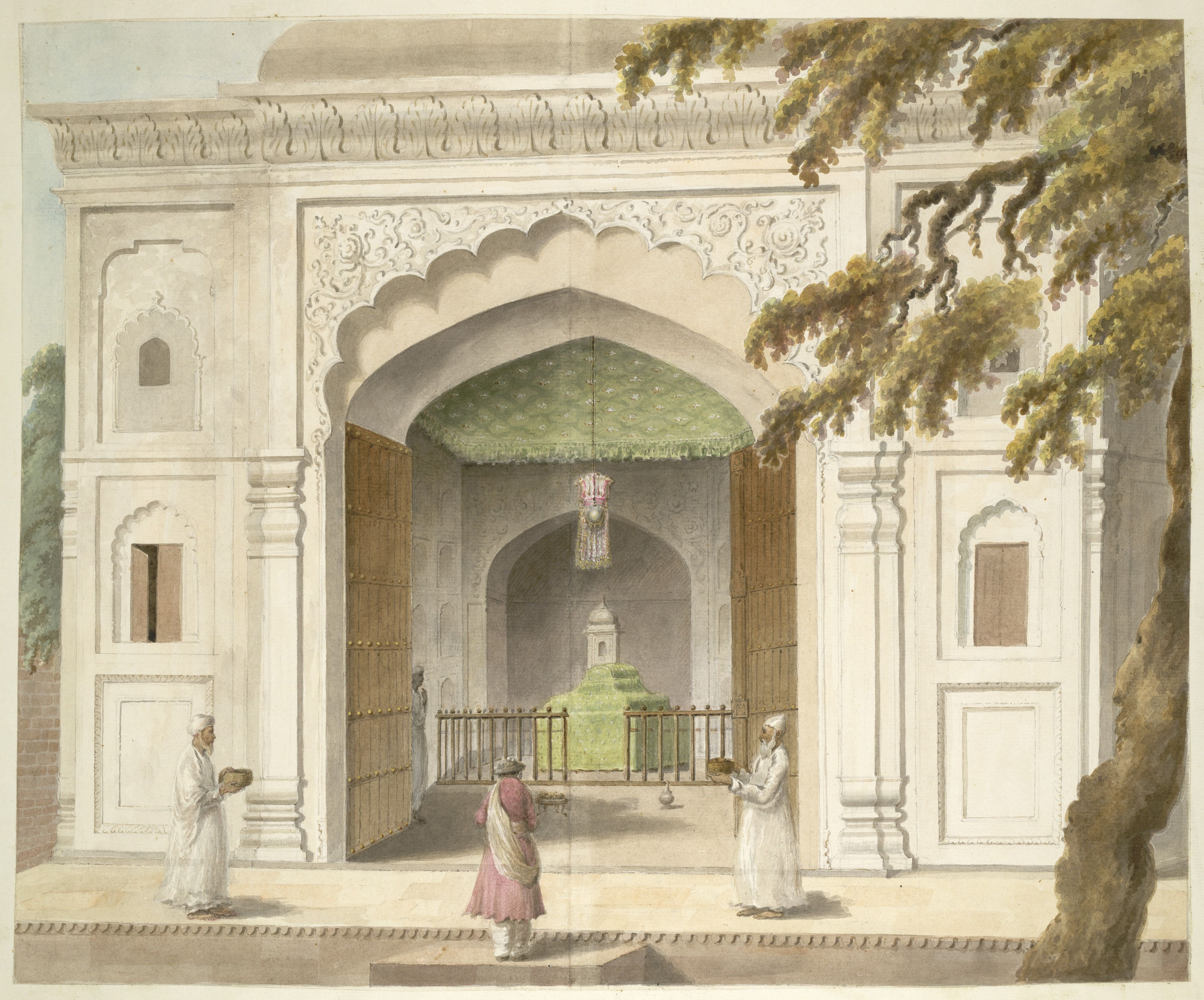
The mausoleum of Rohilla chief, Hafiz Rahmat Khan at Bareilly, India.

In 1623 two Afghan brothers of the Barech tribe, Shah Alam and Husain Khan, settled in the region, bringing with them multiple other Pashtun settlers. It was with the immigration of Daud Khan, an Afghan (who originally hails from Roh in Afghanistan) in the region that the Afghan Rohillas had come into prominence. His adopted son Ali Muhammad Khan succeeded in carving out an estate for himself in the district with his headquarters in the region. He was ultimately made the lawful governor of Kateher by the Mughal emperor Aurangzeb Alamgir (ruled 1658–1707), and the region was henceforth called "the land of the Ruhelas." Eventually after the end of the Mughal Empire multiple Pathans migrated from 'Rohilkhand'.

Bareilly as a ruined city became crowded with unemployed, restless Rohilla Pathans (Afghans or Pashtuns). Multiple urban cities in Uttar Pradesh were experiencing economic stagnation and poverty. Naturally, this led to heavy migration overseas to Suriname and Guyana.

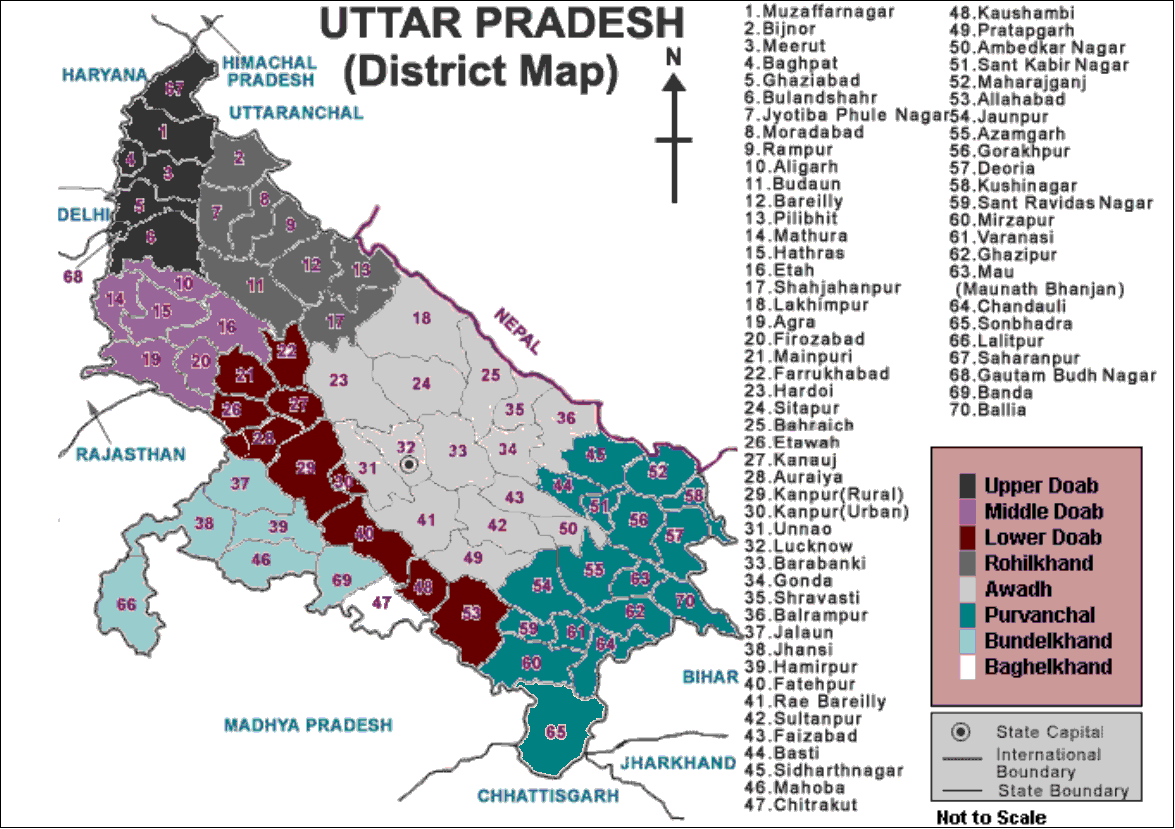
Regions of Uttar Pradeshincluding Rohilkhand(with Bareilly as its capital)

Meanwhile, Ali Muhammad Khan (1737–1749), grandson of Shah Alam, captured the city of Bareilly and made it his capital, later uniting the Rohillas to form the 'State of Rohilkhand', between 1707 and 1720, making Bareilly his capital. He rapidly rose to power and got confirmed in possession of the lands he had seized.

According to 1901 census of India, the total Pathan population in Bareilly District was 40,779, out of a total population of 1,090,117. Their principal clans were the Yusafzais, Ghoris, Lodis, Ghilzai, Barech, Marwat, Durrani, Tanoli, Tarin, Kakar, Khattak, Afridi and Baqarzai. Other important cities were Rampur, Shahjahanpur, Badaun, and others.

The term Rohilla is derived from the Pashto Roh, meaning mountain, and literally means a mountain air, and was used by the Baluch and Jats of the Derajat region to refer to the Pashtun mountains tribes of Loralai, Zhob and Waziristan regions. The Rohillas and are men of a taller stature, a fairer complexion and a more arrogant air than the general inhabitants of the district. The Muslims in the area are chiefly the descendants of Yousafzai Afghans tribe of Pashtuns, called the Rohilla Pathans of the Mandanh sub-section, (but other Pashtuns also became part of the community), who settled in the country about the year 1720. Rohilla's Sardar like Daud Khan, Ali Muhammad Khan, and the legendary Hafiz Rahmat Khan Barech were from the renowned Afghan tribe the Barech, who were originally from the Kandahar Province of Afghanistan. In Uttar Pradesh, it was used for all Pashtuns, except for the Shia Bangashes who settled in the Rohilkhand region, or men serving under Rohilla chiefs. Rohillas were distinguished by their separate language and culture. They spoke Pashto among each other but gradually lost their language over time and now converse in Urdu.

Bishop Heber described them as follows: - "The country is burdened with a crowd of lazy, profligate, self-called sawars (cavaliers), who, though many of them are not worth a rupee, conceive it derogatory to their gentility and Pathan blood to apply themselves to any honest industry, and obtain for the most part a precarious livelihood by sponging on the industrious tradesmen and farmers, on whom they levy a sort of blackmail, or as hangers-on to the wealthy and noble families yet remaining in the province. These men have no visible means of maintenance, and no visible occupation except that of lounging up and down with their swords and shields, like the ancient Highlanders, whom in many respects they much resemble."

=== Rule of Hafiz Rahmat Khan Barech ===
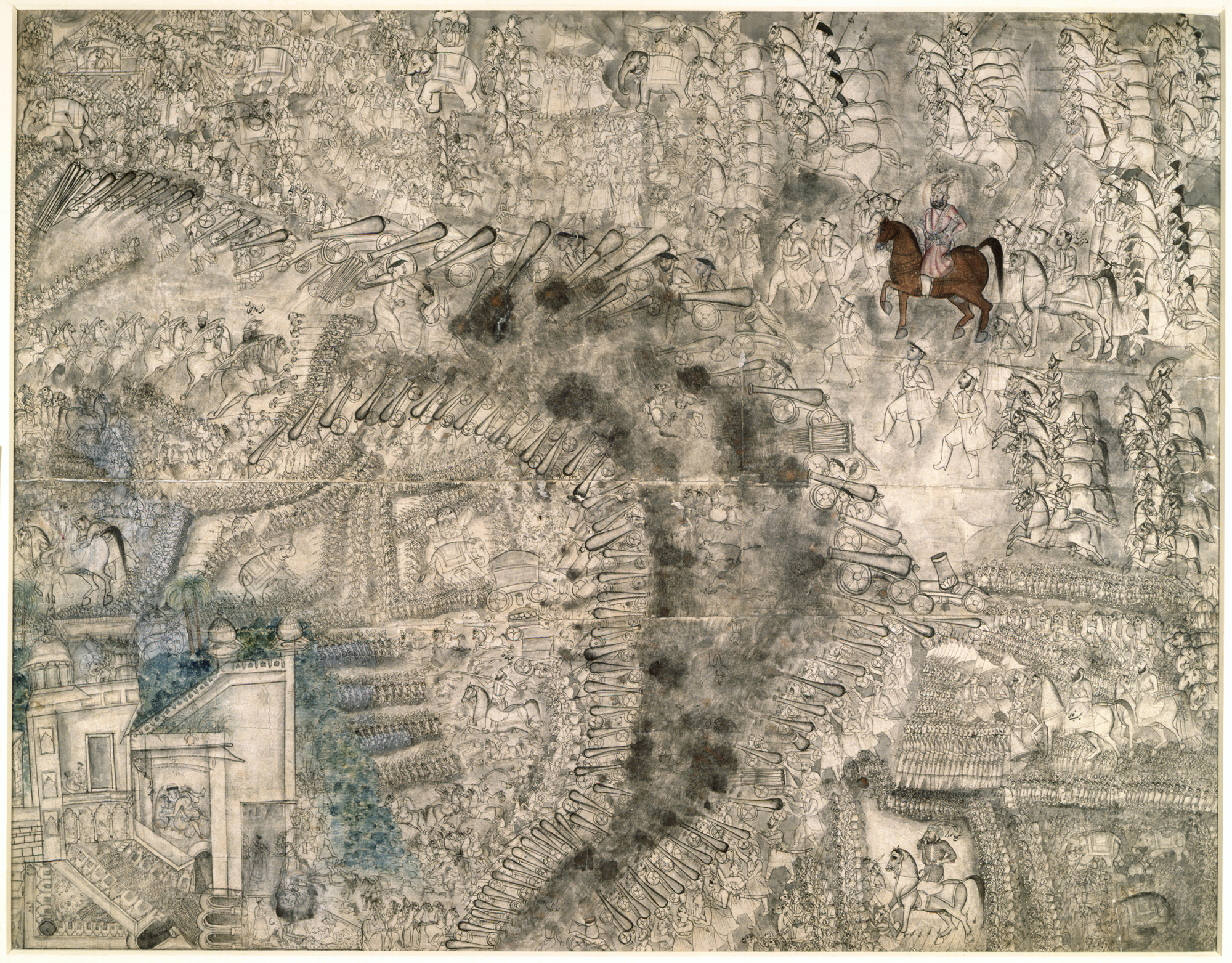
Hafiz Rahmat Khan, standing right to Ahmad Shah Durrani, who is shown on a brown horse.(during The 'Third battle of Panipat') 14 January 1761

Ali Muhammad was succeeded by Hafiz Rahmat Khan Barech (1749–1774), whom he appointed h¹fiz or regent of Rohilkhand on his deathbed. Hafiz Rahmat Khan Barech extended the power of Rohilkhand from Almora in the North to Etawah in the South-West.

== Maratha attack and aid from Oudh ==
After the accession of Shuja-ud-daula as the Nawab of Oudh, Rohilkhand (under Hafiz Rahmat Khan Barech) joined the imperial troops in their attack upon that prince, but the Nawab bought them off with a subsidy of 500,000. Later, Rahmat Khan took advantage of being on the winning side at the Third Battle of Panipat of 1761 and successfully blocked the expansion of the Maratha Empire into north India. He continuously strengthened himself by fortifying his towns and founding new strongholds. Shuja-ud-daula on the other hand engaged in his struggle against British power.

The Marathas defeated Rohilla in 1772 and overran whole of Rohilkhand in 1772, after which Rohilla asked for Nawab of Oudh help but Nawab knew that his forces are no match to the Marathas. After plundering Rohillakhand the Marathas proceed towards Oudh sensing the same fate as Rohilla, the Nawab made frantic calls to British troops in Bengal. The East India Company knew that the Nawab of Oudh did not pose any danger to them whereas Maratha will try to invade Bengal and Bihar after overrunning Oudh. It sent 20,000 British troops to fight the Maratha and the two armies came face to face in Ram Ghat but the sudden demise of the Peshwa and the struggle in Pune to choose the next Peshwa forced the Maratha army to retreat. The Rohilla decided not to pay Nawab of Oudh because there was no war between the two states. The British made Oudh a buffer state in order to protect it from the Maratha and the British troops started protecting Oudh. The subsidy of one British brigade to provide protection to Nawab and Oudh from the Maratha was decided to be Rs 210,000.

After the war Nawab Shuja-ud-Daula demanded payment for their help from the Rohilla chief, Hafiz Rahmat Khan Barech. When the demand was refused, the Nawab joined with the British under Governor Warren Hastings and his Commander-in-Chief, Alexander Champion, to invade Rohilkhand.

== Rohilla War ==
The First Rohilla War of 1773-1774 was a punitive campaign by Shuja-ud-Daula, Nawab of Awadh, against the Rohillas, Afghan highlanders settled in Rohilkhand, northern India. The Nawab was supported by troops of the British East India Company, in a successful campaign brought about by the Rohillas reneging on a debt to the Nawab.

Rohilkhand fell to Awadh, was plundered and occupied. The majority of the Rohillas left. They fled across the Ganges in numbers, to start a guerilla war; or emigrated. A Rohilla state under British protection was set up in Rampur.

The Rohillas, after fifty years' precarious independence, were conquered in 1774 by the confederacy of British troops with the nawab of Oudh's army, which formed so serious a charge against Warren Hastings. There was a second Rohilla War, in 1794.

== Period under the Patronage of Oudh ==
From 1774 to 1800, the province was ruled by the Nawabs of Awadh. Faiz-ullah, the son of Ali Muhammad, escaped to the north-west and became the leader of Rohillas. After multiple negotiations he effected a treaty with Shuja-ud-daula in 1774, by which he accepted nine parganas worth 1.5 million a year, giving up all the remainder of Rohilkhand to the Wazir of Rampur State.

Saadat Ali was appointed governor of Bareilly under the Oudh government.

In 1794 a revolution in Rampur State led to the dispatch of a British force, who fought the insurgents at Bhitaura or Fatehganj (West)-both in Bareilly District, where an obelisk still commemorates the casualties.

Bareilly remained in the hands of the Wazir until 1801, when Rohilkhand, with Allahabad and Kora, was ceded to the British in lieu of tribute.

== Bareilly retaining its status as a major mint ==
During this period too, Bareilly retained its status as a mint. Emperor Akbar and his descendants minted gold and silver coins at mints in Bareilly. The Afghan conqueror Ahmed Shah Durani too minted gold and silver coins at the Bareilly mint.

During the time of Shah Alam II, Bareilly was the headquarters of Rohilla Sardar Hafiz Rehmat Khan and many more coins were issued. After that, the city was in possession of Awadh Nawab Asaf-ud-Daulah. The coins that he issued had Bareilly, Bareilly Aasfabad, and Bareilly kite and fish as identification marks. After that, the minting of coins passed on to the East India Company.

== Rule of British East India Company ==
=== Administrative control and division into districts ===
Mr. Henry Wellesley, brother of the Governor General, was appointed president of the Board of Commissioners sitting in Bareilly. In 1805, Amir khan, the Pindari, made an inroad into Rohilkhand, but was driven off. Disturbance occurred in 1816, in 1837 and in 1842 but the peace of the district was not seriously endangered until the Mutiny of 1857.

After annexation in 1801, Rohilkhand was divided into two districts, Bareilly and a comparatively new city of Moradabad. Shahjahanpur district was formed in 1813–14; Budaun in 1824; the south of Nainital district was taken away in 1858 and sixty-four villages were given, as a reward for loyalty, to the nawab of Rampur. Pilibhit was made a separate district in 1879.

== Indian Rebellion of 1857 ==
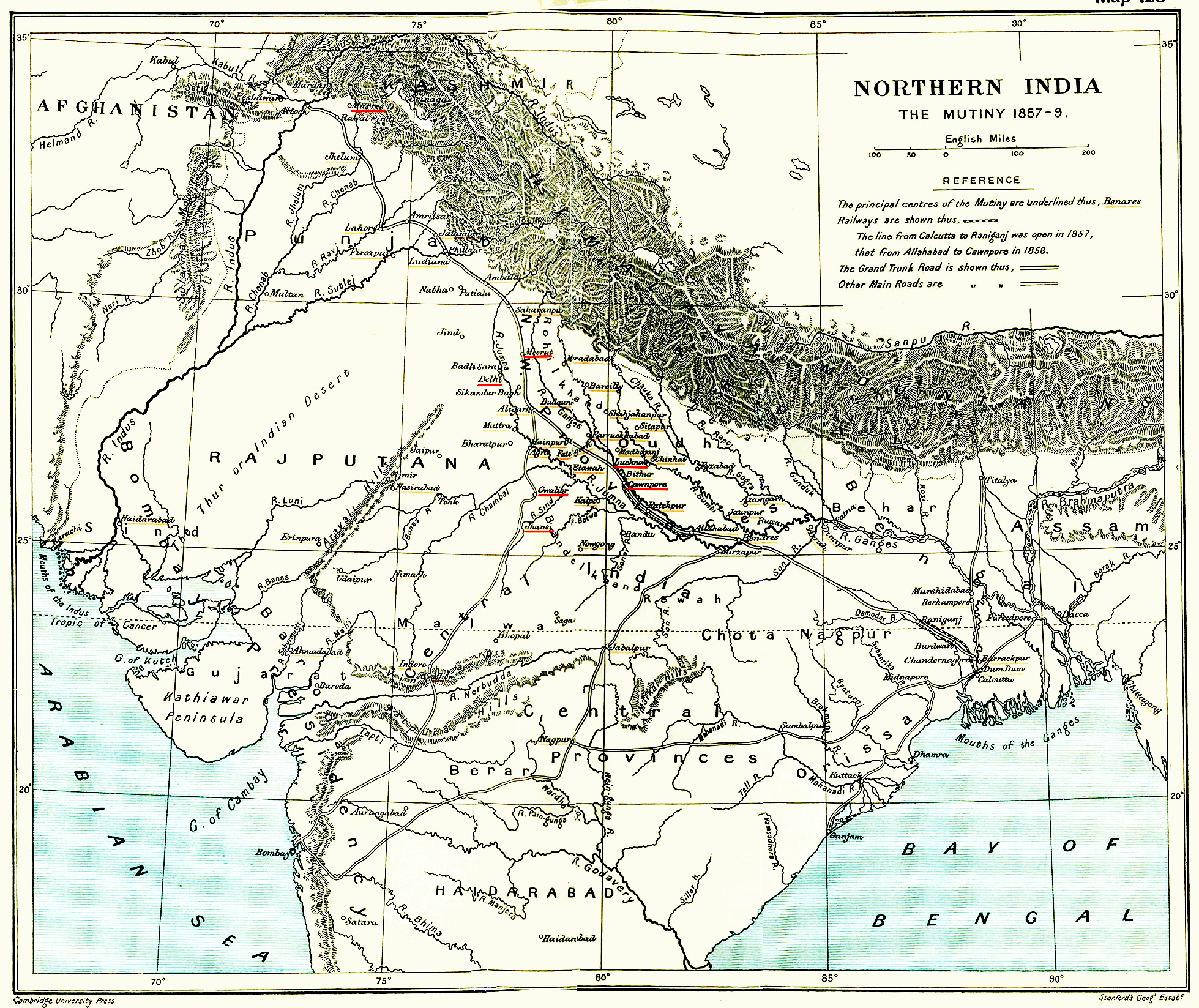
A 1912 map of 'Northern India The Revolt of 1857-59' showing the centres of rebellion including the principal ones: Meerut, Delhi, Bareilly, (Kanpur), Lucknow, Jhansi, and Gwalior

Bareilly (Rohilkhand) was a major centre during the Indian Rebellion of 1857 (also known as India's First War of Independence). The Rebellion which began as a mutiny of native soldiers (sepoys) employed by the three Presidency armies, against perceived race- based injustices and inequities, on 10 May 1857, in the town of Meerut, soon erupted into other mutinies and civilian rebellions which were mainly centred on north central India along the several major river valleys draining the south face of the Himalayas [See red annotated locations on Map at right] but with local episodes extending both northwest to Peshawar on the north-west frontier with Afghanistan and southeast beyond Delhi.

The news of the outbreak of the struggle of independence which started at Meerut reached Bareilly on 14 May 1857. The people rose in revolt, occupied treasury and burnt the records of Kotwali, Khan Bahadur khan, the grandson of Hafiz Rahmat Khan was able to form his own government by appointing Sobha Ram Diwan, Madar Ali Khan and Niyaz Muhammed Khan generals and Hori Lal as paymaster.

During the Mutiny of 1857 the Rohillas, though already been disarmed, took a very active part against the English. Khan Badur Khan Rohilla, the grandson of Hafiz Rahmat Khan formed his own government in Bareilly in 1857 Indian revolt against British. During the period troops were raised at Bareilly from 1 June 1857, and tumults at once broke out amongst the population in the city, while the surrounding villages remained prey to the rapacity and extortion of the rival Zamindars. The Joint Magistrate was forced to flee to Nainital. The mutineers of city nominally admitted the authority of Khan Bahadur Khan Rohilla, the self-declared Nawab of Bareilly.

British order was restored on 13 May 1858 by an expeditionary force lent by Commander Colin Campbell of 9th Regiment of Foot with the help of Captain George Stewart of 93rd Regiment of Foot, after winning the Bareilly battle. Some of the mutineers were captured and sentenced to death. When the Indian Rebellion of 1857 failed Bareilly, too, was subjugated. Khan Bahadur Khan was sentenced to death and hanged in the Kotwali on 24 February 1860.

Communal hatred led to communal riots in multiple parts of U.P. The green flag was hoisted and Muslims in Bareilly, Bijnor, Moradabad, and other places the Muslims shouted for the revival of Muslim kingdom.

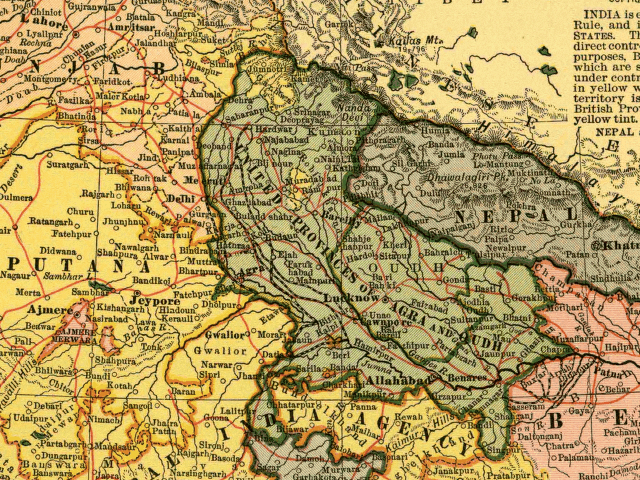
Bareilly was made the part of United Provinces of Agra and Oudh

During the First War of Indian Independence in 1857, Khan Bhadur Khan issued silver coins from Bareilly as an independent ruler. These coins are a novelty as far as the numismatist is concerned.

The main conflict occurred largely in the upper Gangetic plain and central India, with the major hostilities confined to present-day Uttar Pradesh, Bihar, northern Madhya Pradesh, and the Delhi region. The rebellion posed a considerable threat to British East India Company's power in that region, and it was contained only with the fall of Gwalior on 20 June 1858. Some regard the rebellion as the first of several movements over ninety years to achieve independence, which was finally achieved in 1947.

The population in 1901 was 1,090,117. Bareilly, also, was the headquarters of a brigade in the 7th division of the eastern army corps in British period.

=== Railway in Bareilly ===
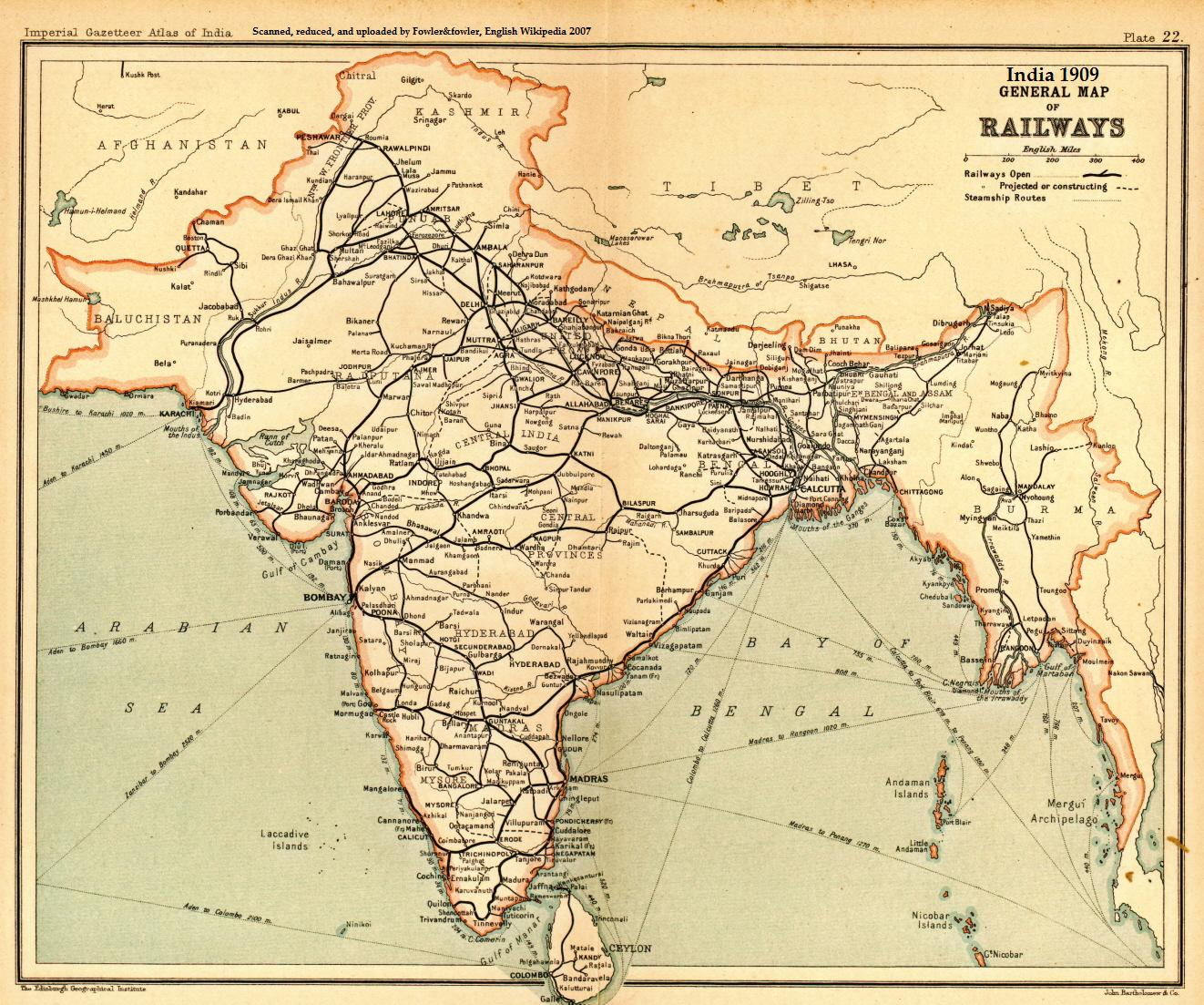
Indian Railways Network in 1909.

Bareilly is well connected with the rest of the country through railways from the 19th century. An official map of 1909 shows that Bareilly was a prominent junction of Railway even during the commence of the 20th century with six railway tracks intersecting in the city. In 1890, the Bengal and North Western Railway took over management of the Tirhoot State Railway (under a lease) in an effort to increase the latter's profitability. The Lucknow-Sitapur-Seramow Provincial State Railway merged with the Bareilly-Pilibheet Provincial State Railway to form the Lucknow-Bareilly Railway on 1 January 1891. The Lucknow-Bareilly Railway was owned by the Government of India and worked by the Rohilkund and Kumaon Railway.

The Oudh and Tirhut Railway was a Railway company operated the railway line until 1943 and managed a number of lines until 1943, when it was amalgamated with the Rohilkund and Kumaon Railway, and the Lucknow Bareilly Railway. It became the Oudh-Tirhut Railway. All existing contracts were determined and it became an entirely state-owned enterprise.

The Oudh and Tirhut Railway was formed on 1 January 1943 by the amalgamation of the Bengal and North Western Railway, the Tirhut Railway (BNW worked), the Mashrak-Thawe Extension Railway,(BNW worked), the Rohilkund and Kumaon Railway and the Lucknow-Bareilly Railway (R&K worked). The Oudh and Tirhut Railway was later renamed the Oudh Tirhut Railway and merged with the Assam Railway to form the North Eastern Railway on 14 April 1952.

Its headquarters was at Gorakhpur. On 14 April 1952, the Oudh and Tirhut Railway was amalgamated with the Assam Railway and the Kanpur-Achnera section of the Bombay, Baroda and Central India Railway to form North Eastern Railway, one of the 16 zones of the Indian Railways.

== India independence movement ==
The Indian National Congress came into prominence in Bareilly during the khilafat movement when Gandhiji visited this town twice and a number of Hindus were arrested. In response to the call given by Gandhiji, the Civil Disobedience Movement in the district was launched on Jan 26,1930. In 1936, a conference of the Congress was held in Bareilly under the presidency of Acharya Narendra Deo. It was addressed by Jawaharlal Nehru, M.N. Roy, Purushottam Das Tandon and Rafi Ahmad Kidwai. In 1942 when the 'Quit India' movement was launched, multiple processions and meetings were organised and nearly 200 persons were arrested.

More prominent among them were Damodar Swaroop Seth, Brijmohan Lal Shastri, P.C. Azad, Rammurti, Naurang Lal, Chiranjivi Lal, Udho Narain D.D. Vaidya and Darbari Lal Sharma. In the Bareilly Central Jail at that time were confined such prominent leaders as Jawahar Lal Nehru. Rafi Ahmad Kidwai, Mahavir Tyagi, Sukh Lal Rastogi, Manzar Ali Sokhata and Maulana Hifazul Rahman.

== Bibliography ==
- Bayly, Christopher Alan (1987), Indian Society and the Making of the British Empire, The New Cambridge History of India, vol. II.1, Cambridge University Press, ISBN 978-0-521-38650-0
- Bose, Sugata; Jalal, Ayesha (2003), Modern South Asia: History, Culture, Political Economy (2nd ed.), London: Routledge, p. 253, ISBN 0-415-30787-2
- Metcalf, Barbara D.; Metcalf, Thomas R. (2006), A Concise History of Modern India (2nd ed.), Cambridge University Press, p. 337, ISBN 0-521-68225-8
- Bandyopadhyay, Sekhara (2004), From Plassey to Partition: A History of Modern India, New Delhi: Orient Longman, p. 523, ISBN 81-250-2596-0
- Brown, Judith M. (1994), Modern India: The Origins of an Asian Democracy (2nd ed.), Oxford University Press, p. 480, ISBN 0-19-873113-2
