= Mirganj =

Mirganj may refer to:

- Mirganj, Bihar
- Mirganj, Uttar Pradesh
