= Kargaina =

- Census town
- Location in Uttar Pradesh, India
- Coordinates: 28.325°N 79.398°E
- Country: India
- State: Uttar Pradesh
- District: Bareilly

Population (2001)
  - Total: 9,691

Languages
  - Official: Hindi
- Time zone: UTC+5:30 (IST)

Kargaina is a census town in Bareilly district in the Indian state of Uttar Pradesh.

== History ==
Due to its proximity with Bareilly city, the Kargaina housing scheme was launched by the Bareilly Development Authority (BDA) in 1990. Under the scheme, houses for 732 families from economically weaker section were built in the town. However, the housing scheme didn't take off properly resulting in the degeneration of the area into a slum.

== Demographics ==
As of 2001 India census, Kargaina had a population of 9,691. Males constitute 53% of the population and females 47%. Kargaina has an average literacy rate of 52%, lower than the national average of 59.5%: male literacy is 60%, and female literacy is 44%. In Kargaina, 17% of the population is under 6 years of age.
