= Peer Bahoda =

Peer Bahora
- Village
- Location within Uttar Pradesh
- Coordinates: 28.364°N 79.415°E
- Country: India
- State: Uttar Pradesh
- District: Bareilly
- Established: 1657

Government
  - Member: Mr. Mohammad Salman
  - MLA: Dr. Arun Kumar
  - Mayor: Umesh Gautam

Area
  - Total: 1.2 km^{2} (0.46 sq mi)
- Elevation: 268 m (879 ft)

Population
  - Total: 20,000
- Demonym: Bareilite (Barelvi)
- Time zone: IST
- PIN codes: 243122

Peer Bahora, is a village in the Bareilly District of Uttar Pradesh, India.
