= Serai Niamat Khan =

Serai Niamat Khan Sarai Naimat Khan
- Town and union council
- Interactive map of Serai Niamat Khan
- Coordinates: 34°5′0″N 73°2′0″E
- Country: Pakistan
- Region: Khyber Pakhtunkhwa
- District: Haripur District
- Time zone: UTC+5 (PST)

Serai Niamat Khan, also known as Sarai Niamat Khan, is one of the 44 union councils of the Haripur District in the Khyber Pakhtunkhwa province of Pakistan. It is divided into smaller areas including Mohallah Khu, Jora Pind, Moriyan, Najeeb Abad and Mohalla Ziarat.

== Economy ==
Serai Niamat Khan is a local economic hub surrounding several villages, located about 15 km (9.3 mi) from the Haripur District. The primary income source relies on agriculture; however, due to a lack of water and other resources, several residents have moved into larger cities to find other jobs.

== Transport ==
Serai Niamat Khan is also connected to Havelian, the second largest district in the Abbottad District, which is located about 27 km (17 mi) away. The most common means of transport is by road with most people traveling via local buses, pickups or vans.

== Education ==
There are several government and private sector schools that operate in town. Students from surrounding villages attend these schools with a significant number attending in the nearby city of Haripur. Two schools operate in the area, serving as an all -boys and all-girls school.

== Demographics ==
Most of the people residing in the region belong to the Tanoli, Lodhi, Raja, Awan, Gakhar or Turkish tribes.

== Religion ==
The population is predominantly Muslim. A Jamia mosque occupies the town center.

== Climate ==
The local weather is characterized by the lack of a dry season and a hot summer. The rainiest months are July and August, and summer heats reach over 90 °F (32 °C). Sunlight hours tay similar throughout the year. The Köppen Climate Classification subtype for this climate is "Cfa" (humid subtropical climate).

Climate data for Serai Niamat Khan
Month	Jan	Feb	Mar	Apr	May	Jun	Jul	Aug	Sep	Oct	Nov	Dec	Year
Mean daily maximum °F (°C)	63 (17.2)	65 (18.3)	75 (23.8)	83 (28.3)	92 (33.3)	96 (35.5)	93 (33.8)	91 (32.7)	90 (32.2)	85 (29.4)	75 (23.8)	68 (20)	81.3 (27.3)
Daily mean °F (°C)	51.5 (10.8)	54.5 (12.5)	63 (17.2)	70.5 (21.4)	78.5 (25.8)	83.5 (28.6)	83.5 (28.6)	82.5 (28.1)	79 (26.1)	71.5 (21.9)	62 (16.6)	55.5 (13.1)	69.6 (20.9)
Mean daily minimum °F (°C)	40 (4.4)	44 (6.6)	51 (10.5)	58 (14.4)	65 (18.3)	71 (21.6)	74 (23.3)	74 (23.3)	68 (20)	58 (14.4)	49 (9.4)	43 (6.1)	57.9 (14.3)
Average precipitation inches (mm)	2.18 (55.3)	5.41 (137.5)	4.97 (126.3)	3.63 (92.2)	1.98 (50.3)	1.81 (46.1)	8.5 (216)	9.52 (241.8)	3.93 (99.9)	1.52 (38.7)	0.76 (19.4)	0.96 (24.3)	45.19 (1,147.8)
Average rainfall inches (mm)	2.18 (55.3)	5.41 (137.5)	4.97 (126.3)	3.63 (92.2)	1.98 (50.3)	1.81 (46.1)	8.5 (216)	9.52 (241.8)	3.93 (99.9)	1.52 (38.7)	0.76 (19.4)	0.96 (24.3)	45.19 (1,147.8)
Average snowfall inches (mm)	0 (0)	0 (0)	0 (0)	0 (0)	0 (0)	0 (0)	0 (0)	0 (0)	0 (0)	0 (0)	0 (0)	0 (0)	0 (0)
Average precipitation days	7	10	12	14	10	9	20	21	12	5	4	3	127
Mean monthly sunshine hours	338.5	309.3	345.7	350.7	364.7	355.3	357.3	355.1	356.3	369.4	347.7	351.3	4,201.3
Average ultraviolet index	4	4	6	7	8	8	7	8	7	6	5	4	6.2
