= Nagaria Sadat railway station =

Railway station in Uttar Pradesh

- Indian Railways logo

General information
- Location: Mirganj, Bareilly, Uttar Pradesh; India
- Coordinates: 28.5500°N 79.2058°E
- Elevation: 178 metres (584 ft)
- System: Indian Railways station
- Owner: Indian Railways
- Operator: Northern Railway
- Line: Lucknow–Moradabad line
- Platforms: 3
- Connections: Auto stand

Construction
- Structure type: Standard (on-ground station)

Other information
- Station code: NRS
- Zone(s): Northern Railway
- Division(s): Moradabad
Location
- Location within Uttar Pradesh Location within India

Nagaria Sadat railway station (station code: NRS) is a railway station on the Lucknow–Moradabad line located in the town of Mirganj in Bareilly, Uttar Pradesh, India. It is under the administrative control of the Moradabad Division of the Northern Railway zone of the Indian Railways.

The station consists of one platform, and is located at a distance of 31 kilometres (19 mi) from Rampur Junction and 32 kilometres (20 mi) from Bareilly Junction. Four trains (Two Passenger / Two Express) stop at the station.
