= Pipra Nankar =

Coordinates: 28.66933°N 79.56921°E

Pipra Nankar is a village situated in the Damkhauda Mandal of Bareilly District in Uttar Pradesh, India. It is located 2.273 kilometres from the mandal headquarters Damkhoda, and is 36.38 km far from the district headquarters in Bareilly.

Villages nearby include Bakainia Swale (1.4 km), Rath (1.9 km), Gargaiya (2.1 km), Damkhoda (2.2 km), Magri Nawada (2.3 km), Basant Nagar Jagir (2.7 km), and Rahpura Ganimat (2.7 km).
