= Bhadpura =

- Town and Mandal headquarters
- Location in Uttar Pradesh, India
- Coordinates: 28.483°N 79.483°E
- Country: India
- State: Uttar Pradesh
- District: Bareilly
- Time zone: UTC+5:30 (IST)

Bhadpura is a town and mandal headquarters in Bareilly District of Uttar Pradesh, India. It is located at a distance of 35.82 kilometres from the district headquarters at Bareilly.

Villages located within Bhadpura Mandal include Abhai Rajpur, Adhkata Rabbni Begam, Alhiya, Allahpur, Amberpur, Amir Nagar, Amsaha, Atanga Chandpur, Bahir Jagir, Baragaonn, and Barkhan. Those nearest to Bhadpura include Methi Nawadia (1.3 km), Karua Sahib Ganj (1.5 km), Purenia (2.2 km), Atanga Chandpur (2.5 km), Dhakia Barkali Sahib (2.5 km), Amir Nagar (2.9 km), and Nakti Narianpur (3.1 km).
