= Atanga Chandpur =

- Village
- Location within Uttar Pradesh Location within India
- Coordinates: 28.50°N 79.75°E
- Country: India
- State: Uttar Pradesh
- District: Bareilly
- Established: 1556
- Founder: Amaan Ullaah (Mullah Aman ullah)

Languages
  - Official: Hindi
- Time zone: UTC+5:30 (IST)
- PIN: 262406
- Nearest city: Nawabganj, Bareilly, Bisalpur
- Literacy: 65%
- Climate/hot, cold and mansoon: cold (Köppen)

Atanga Chandpur is a village situated in Bhadpura Mandal of Bareilly District in Uttar Pradesh in India. The village is 2.507 km distance from the mandal headquarters in Bhadpura, and is 36.52 km distance from Bareilly.

Atanga Chandpur is a mid sized village and has a population of about 2,439 persons living in around 374 households. Most of the population is Muslim, belonging to the Afghani Kabuli Pathan, Ansari, Mansoori, Qassab and Faqir communities.

Villages nearby include Methi Nawadia (1.1 km), Purenia (1.3 km), Surajpur Parauria (2.0 km), Karua Sahib Ganj (2.4 km), Bhadpuraa (2.5 km), Delel Nagar (3.4 km) and Dhakia Barkali Sahib (3.7 km).
