= Pipalsana Chaudhari =

- Census town
- Location in Uttar Pradesh, India
- Coordinates: 28°56′N 78°49′E
- Country: India
- State: Uttar Pradesh
- District: Bareilly

Population (2001)
  - Total: 7,964

Languages
  - Official: Hindi
- Time zone: UTC+5:30 (IST)

Pipalsana Chaudhari is a census town in Bareilly district in the Indian state of Uttar Pradesh.

== Demographics ==
As of 2001 India census, Pipalsana Chaudhari had a population of 7,964. Males constitute 53% of the population and females 47%. Pipalsana Chaudhari has an average literacy rate of 55%, lower than the national average of 59.5%: male literacy is 65%, and female literacy is 45%. In Pipalsana Chaudhari, 19% of the population is under 6 years of age.
