= Mukrand Rai =

17th century Mughal governor

Mukrand Rai was appointed as governor of Bareilly region, modern Uttar Pradesh in India, in 1657 by Mughal emperor Aurangzeb. Mukrand Rai fortified and built the town of Bareilly. The foundation of the 'modern' City of Bareilly was laid by Mukrand Rai in 1657.

The city of Bareilly was founded in 1537 by Basdeo, a Katehriya Rajput. The city is mentioned in the histories for the first time by Budayuni who writes that one Husain Quli Khan was appointed the governor of 'Bareilly and Sambhal' in 1568. The divisions and revenue of the district "being fixed by Todar Mal" were recorded by Abul Fazl in 1596. In 1658, Bareilly was made the headquarters of the province of Budaun.
