= Ramnagar, Bareilly =

Ramnagar
- village
- Location in Uttar Pradesh, India Ramnagar (India)
- Coordinates: 28.366669°N 79.11654°E
- Country: India
- State: Uttar Pradesh
- District: Bareilly

Government
  - Body: Gram panchayat

Languages
  - Official: Hindi
- Time zone: UTC+5:30 (IST)
- PIN: 243203
- Vehicle registration: up25 barielly district
- Nearest city: Aonla
- Literacy: 70%%
- Lok Sabha constituency: Aonla
- Vidhan Sabha constituency: ramnagar
- Website: up.gov.in

Ramnagar is a town situated in the Ramnagar Mandal of Bareilly District in Uttar Pradesh, India. It is about 29 kilometres (18 mi) from the district headquarters at Bareilly, 247 kilometres (153 mi) from the state capital at Lucknow and more than 200 km 300 miles from the border with Nepal.

Villages in Ramnagar Mandal are Ramnagar, Ajmer, Alampur Kot, Anjani Mustkil, Atta Urfh Funda Nagar, Barathanpur, Bari Khera, Barsera Sikandarpur, Beudhan Buzurg, Beudhan Khurd, Prathvipur(Ramnagar) and Chakarpur Gahi.

Villages near the town include ( 9.4 km ), Alampur Kot ( 2.0 km ), Udaybhanpur Urf Anandpur ( 2.7 km ), Bari Khera ( 2.8 km ), Tigra Khanpur ( 2.8 km ), Islamnagar Urf Dalippur ( 2.9 km ), and Mauchand Pur ( 2.9 km )
