= Ahichchhatra Jain temples =

Jain temple in Uttar Pradesh, India

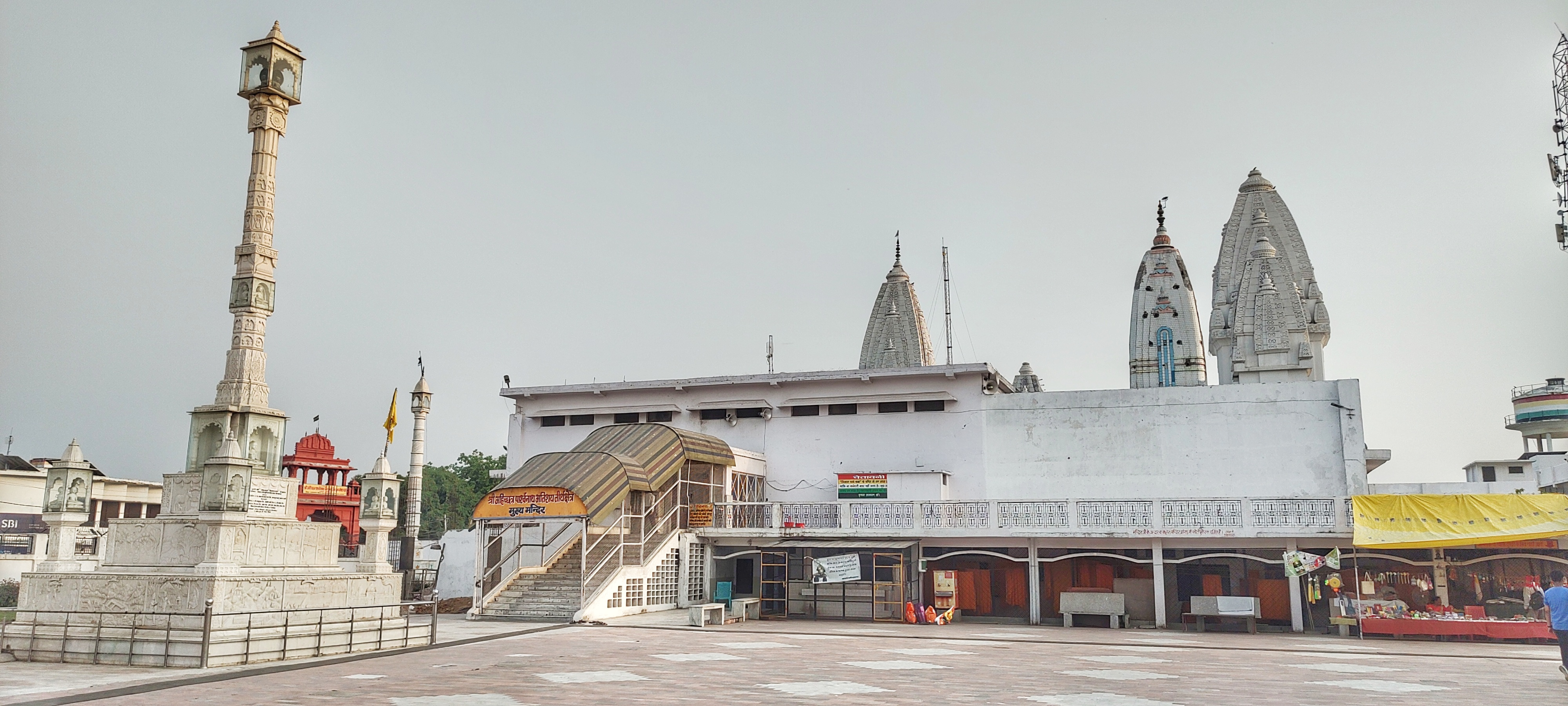
- Shri Ahichchhatra Parshvanath Atishaya Kshetra Digamber Jain Mandir

- Location within Uttar Pradesh

Religion
- Affiliation: Jainism
- Sect: Digambara and Śvētāmbara
- Deity: Parshvanatha
- Festivals: Mahavir Jayanti, Ahichhatra Jain Mela

Location
- Location: Ahichchhatra, Bareilly, Uttar Pradesh
- Interactive map of Ahichchhatra Jain temples
- Coordinates: 28°22′23″N 79°07′06″E

Architecture
- Creator: King Vasupal
- Temple: 7

The Ahichchhatra Jain temples is a group of Jain temples in Ahichchhatra village in Aonla tehsil of Bareilly district in Uttar Pradesh, North India. Ahichchhatra is believed to be the place where Parshvanatha, the 23rd Tirthankar of Jainism, attained Kevala Jnana.

== Jain tradition ==
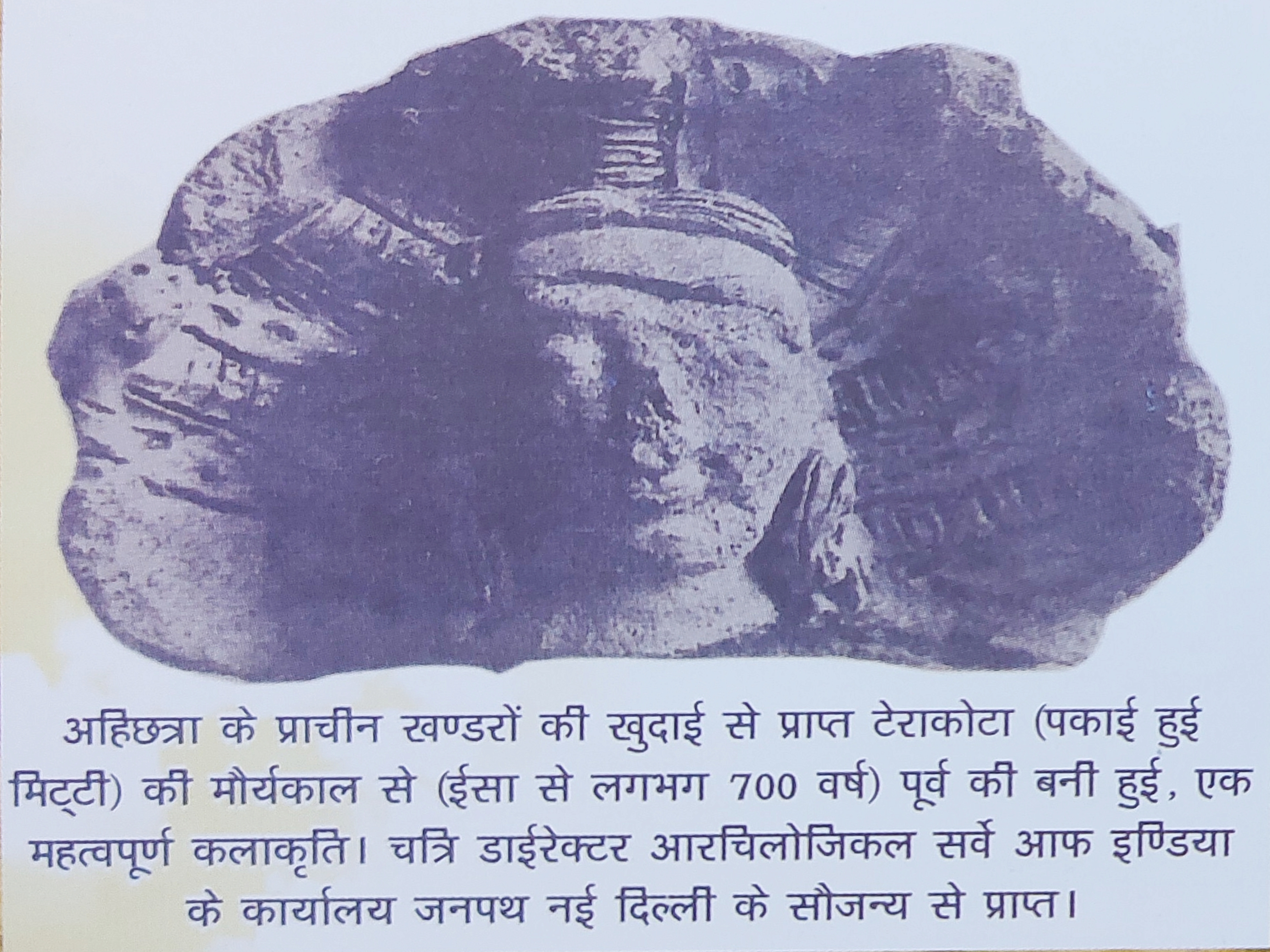
Parshvanatha sculpture excavated from Ahichchhatra, 7th century BCE

The history of Ahichchhatra traditionally starts from the period of Rishabhanatha, the first tirthankara. According to Digambara belief, it was visited by all 24 Tirthankaras. Ahichchhatra is believed to be the place where Parshvanatha, the 23rd Tirthankar of Jainism, attained Kevala gyana (omniscience). According to Jain texts, it was visited by Parshvanatha during vihara; in an attempt to obstruct Parshvanatha from achieving Kevala Jnana, Kamath, his elder brother, caused continuous rain. Parshvanatha was immersed in water up to his neck but was protected by the serpent God Dharanendra, who held a canopy of a thousand hoods over his head, and the Goddess Padmavati who coiled herself around his body. Following this event, the place was renamed to Ahichchhatra (transl. Serpent umbrella).

== History ==
Ahichchhatra was one of the sixteen Mahajanapadas. It was considered an important town when Hiuen Tsang visited India in the 7th century CE. Several ancient Jain āyāgapaṭa were excavated from this site, including the famous Nāṃdighoṣa āyāgapaṭa dated early c. 15 CE. 27 Jain inscriptions discovered here bear dates prior to 100 CE.

Alois Anton Führer excavated a Jain temple constructed during the reign of Indo-Scythians dynasty, enhrining idols from 96—152 CE. A number of Jain temples were discovered by Alexander Cunningham during excavation. Many idols, stupas and pillars from the Kushan and Gupta periods have been discovered in Ahichchhatra.

Vividha Tirtha Kalpa, composed by Śvetāmbara Acharya Jinaprabha Suri in the 14th century CE, mentions Samkhyāvatǐ as the earlier name of Ahichchhatra and describes two Jain temples dedicated to Parshvanatha in the area. According to Ahicchatra-nagri-kalpa, this place was visited by Goddess Ambika. Kaivalyamala, written by Śvetāmbara Jain acharya Udyotansuri in c. 778 CE, mentions that Harigupta of the Gupta Empire took diksha here.

== Temples ==
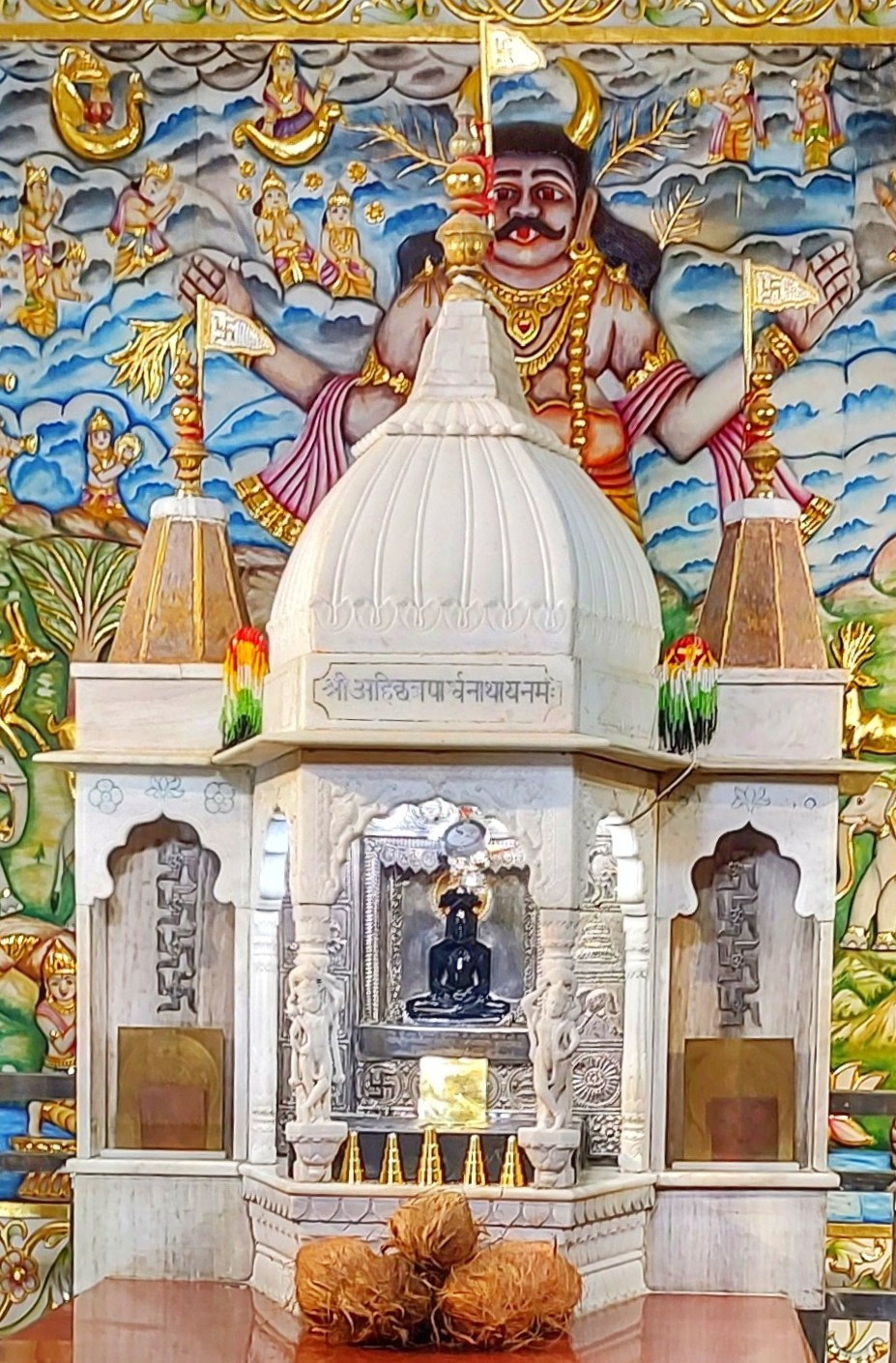
Parshvanath idol commonly known as Tikhal wale Baba

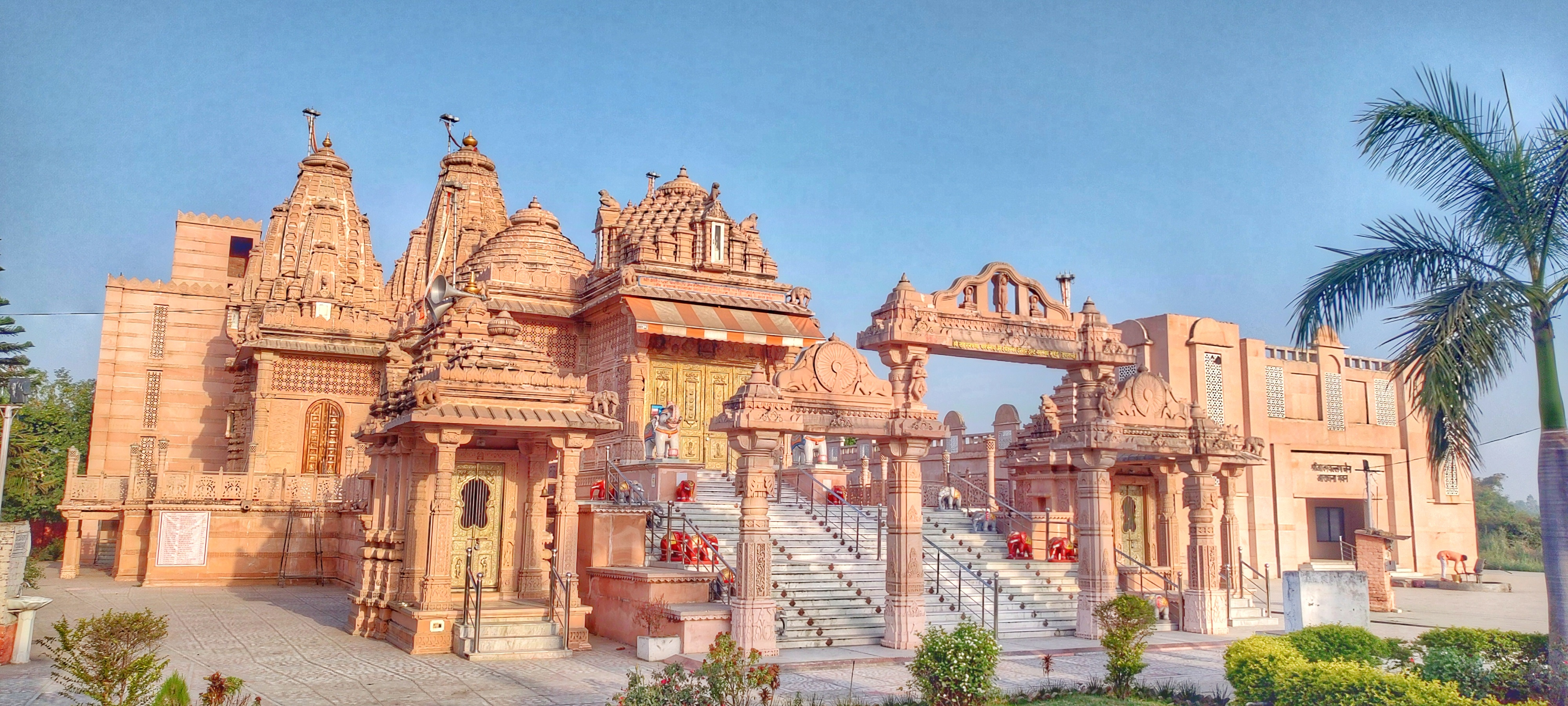
Shwetambar Jain temple

The temples in Ahichchhatra were built to commemorate Parshvanatha attaining Kēvalajñāna kalyāṇaka.

Digambara Jain temple

The Digambara Jain temple was initially constructed during the reign of King Vasupal. The temple was later reconstructed in 1975. The temple contains 7 vedis, one of which has a 6-foot (1.8 m) idol of Mahavira while others house idols of Parshvanatha in different postures. The main idol of the temple dates back to the 10th century and is popularly known as Tikhal wale Baba.

This temple, dedicated to Parshvanatha, is a major Jain pilgrimage center. According to Uttar Pradesh Tourism, over 436,000 people visited Ahichchhatra Jain Temple in 2019.

Tis Chaubisi temple

The Tis Chaubisi temple was constructed in 2002 CE. The temple houses 720 idols of the 24 Tirthankaras. The mulnayak of this temple is a 13.5-foot (4.1 m) idol of Parshvanatha.

Bhagwan Parshvanath-Padmavati temple

The Bhagwan Parshvanath-Padmavati temple was constructed in 2007 CE. The temple houses an idol of Parshvanatha in the centre with idols of Dharanendra and Padmavati on either side.

Chaubisi temple

The Chaubisi temple is built beside the old Digambara Jain temple in an area spanning 17,500 square metres (188,000 sq ft).

Shwetambar Jain temple

The Shwetambar temple is a beautiful structure known for its unique architecture. The temple is made of buff sandstone and houses a thousand images of the Jain pantheon.

Both Digambara and Shwetambar Jain temple also have a dharamshala equipped with all modern facilities and bhojnalaya.

== Fair ==
Ahichchhatra Jain Mela is the primary festival of this temple and is organized annually in March.

== Gallery ==
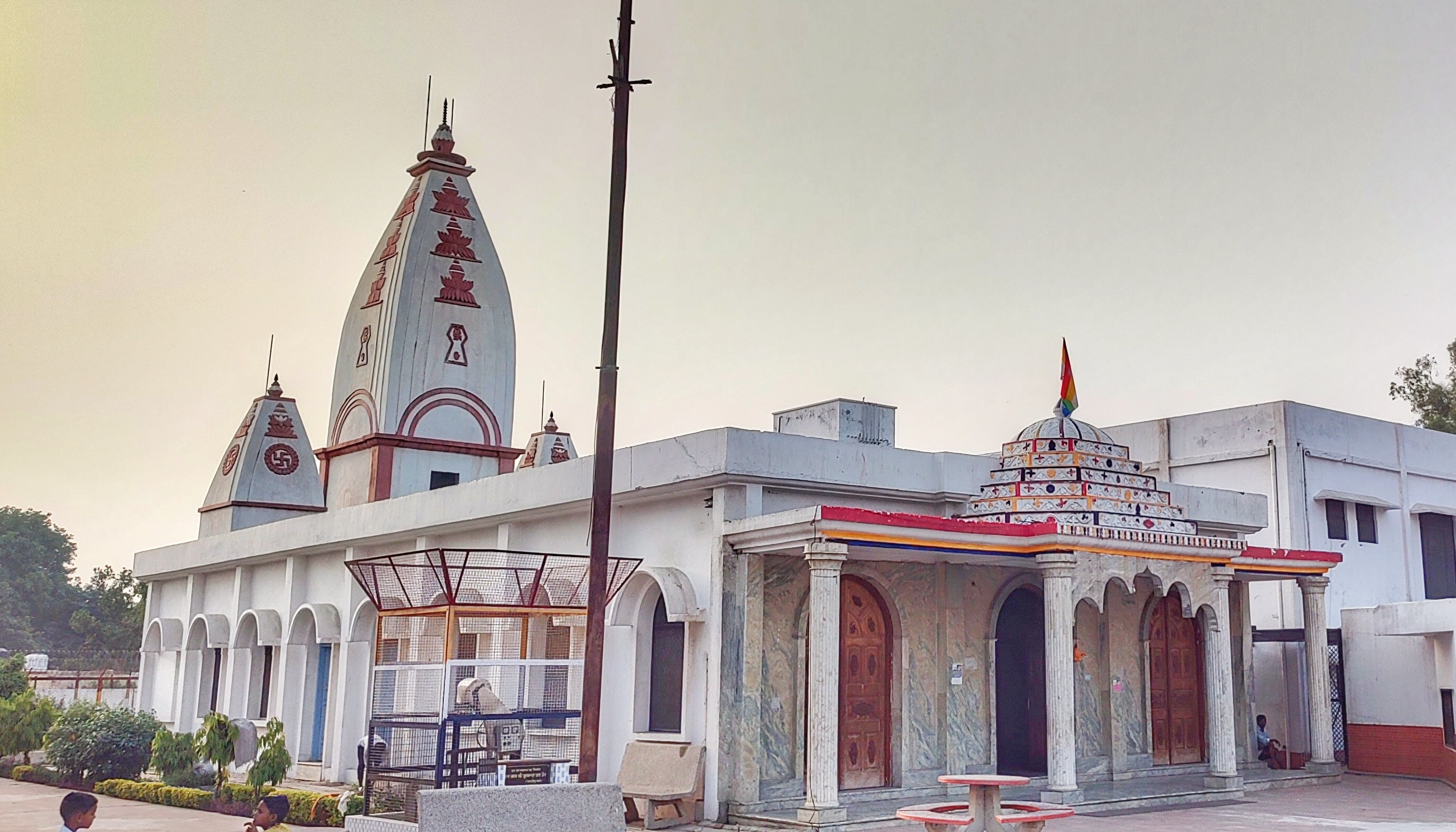
Bhagwan Parshvanath-Padmavati temple

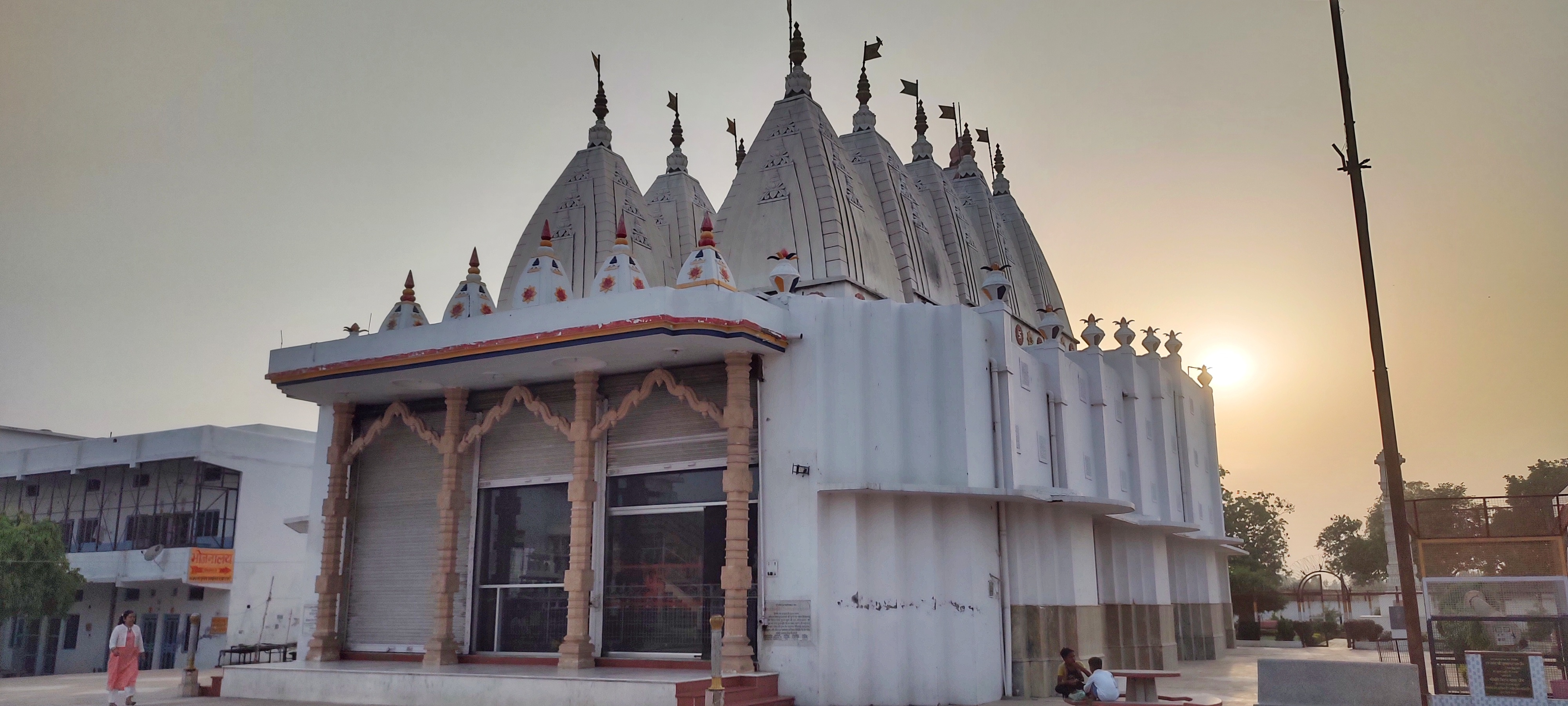
Tis Chaubisi temple

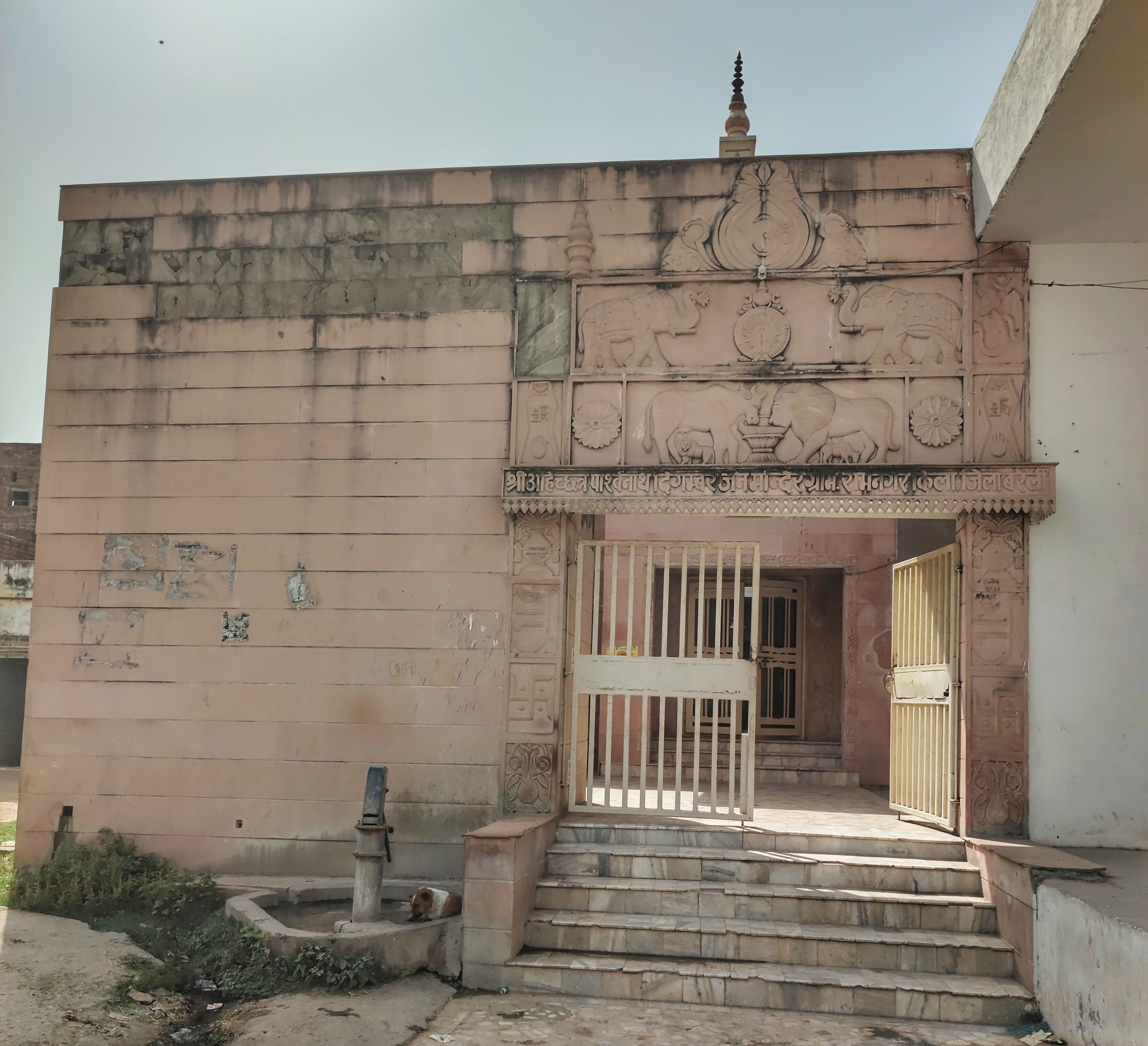
Ahichchhatra ancient village temple

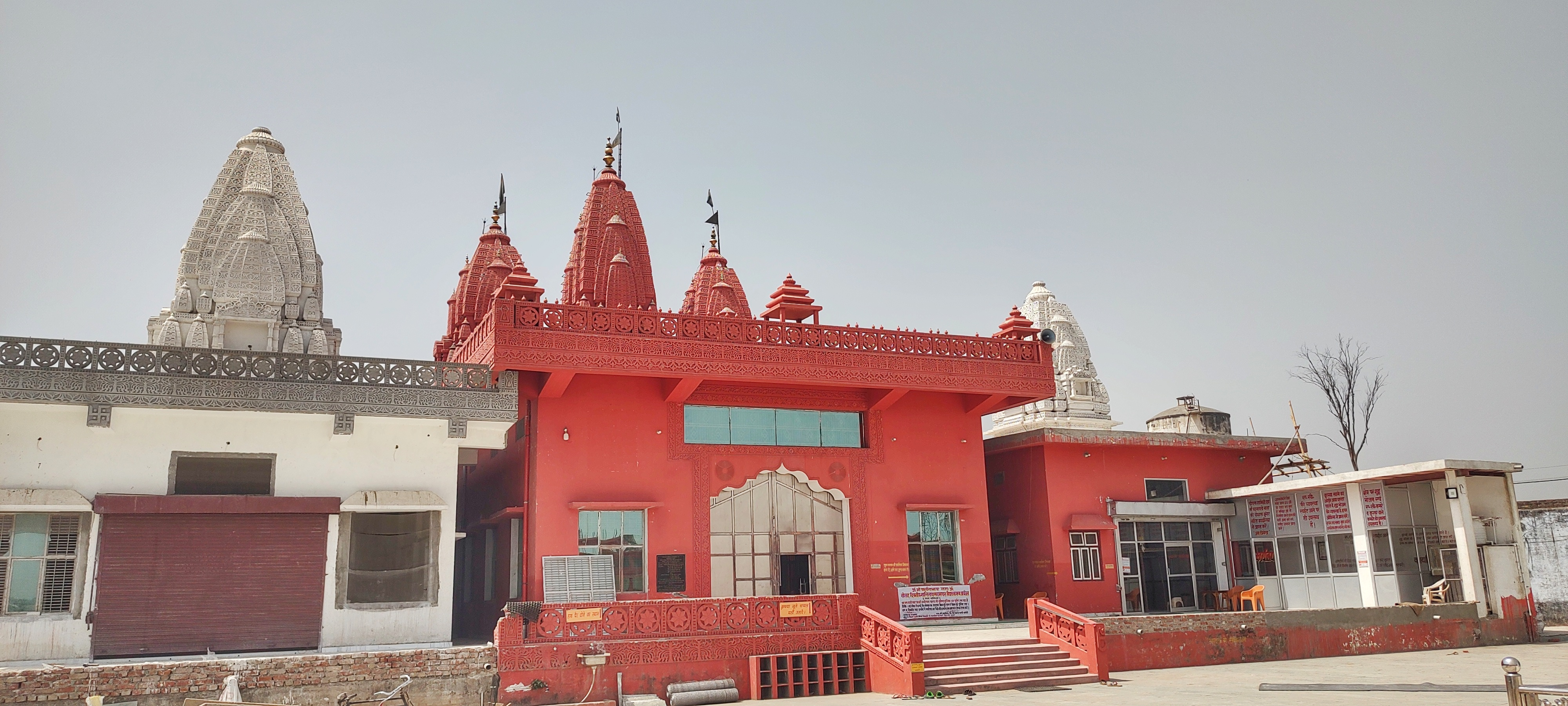
Ahichchhatra Digambar Lal temple

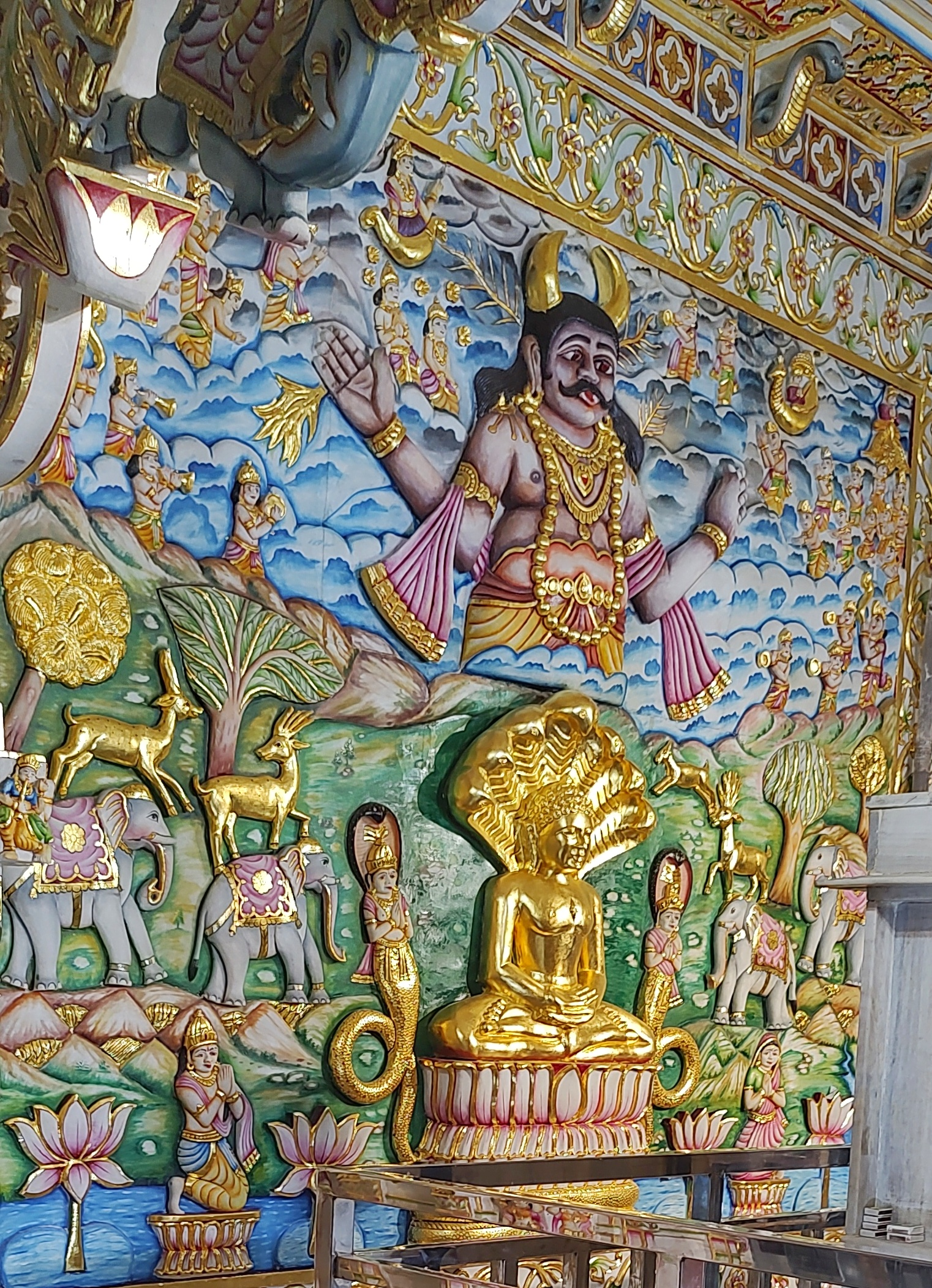
Digamabar Jain temple murals

== See also ==
- Bijolia Parshvanath temple
- Kampilya
- Sarnath Jain Tirth
- Digamber Jain Bada Mandir Hastinapur

== Bibliography ==
- Tandon, O. P. (1986). Jaina Shrines in India. Division Ministry of Information & Broadcasting. ISBN 9788123024547.
