= Mirganj, Uttar Pradesh =

Mirganj
- Town
- Location in Uttar Pradesh, India Mirganj (India)
- Coordinates: 28.541°N 79.208°E
- Country: India
- State: Uttar Pradesh
- District: Bareilly
- Elevation: 170 m (560 ft)

Population (2001)
  - Total: 13,336

Languages
  - Official: Hindi
- Time zone: UTC+5:30 (IST)
- Vehicle registration: UP 25
- Website: up.gov.in

Mirganj is a town and a nagar panchayat in Bareilly district in the Indian state of Uttar Pradesh.

== Geography ==
Mirganj is located at 28.541°N 79.208°E. It has an average elevation of 170 metres (557 feet).

== Demographics ==
As of the 2001 Census of India, Mirganj had a population of 13,336. Males constitute 53% of the population and females 47%. Mirganj has an average literacy rate of 44%, lower than the national average of 59.5%: male literacy is 52%, and female literacy is 35%. In Mirganj, 16% of the population is under 6 years of age.

== Transport ==
Mirganj is located on the National Highway 530, which connects Rampur with Bareilly. The town is served by the Nagaria Sadat railway station.
