= Shamsul-hasan Shams Barelvi =

Pakistani Islamic scholar, professor and translator

Shamsul Hasan Shams Barelvi

Personal life
- Born: 1917 Bareilly, British India
- Died: 1997 (aged 79–80) Karachi, Pakistan
- Notable work: Sarwar-e-Kaunain ki Fasahat

Religious life
- Religion: Islam
- Denomination: Sunni
- Jurisprudence: Hanafi
- Creed: Maturidi
- Movement: Barelvi

Muslim leader
- Awards: Sitara-i-Imtiaz

Shamsul-hasan Shams Barelvi (1917 – 12 March 1997) was a Pakistani Islamic scholar and translator of classical Islamic texts from Persian and Arabic into Urdu. He was a professor of Persian and Arabic at the Manzar-e-Islam seminary in Bareilly, prior to his migration to Karachi, Pakistan.

His book Sarwar-e-Kaunain ki Fasahat won an award from the Government of Pakistan.

He lived and died in Karachi, Sindh, Pakistan where he migrated from British India. The later years of his life were plagued by health problems. He had nine children in various countries. His wife predeceased him. He received the Sitara-i-Imtiaz for his academic work in 1995.

== Literary works ==
The works he authored include:

- Nizam-e-Mustufa (LCCN 88-931463)
- Sarwar-e-Kaunain ki Fasahat
- Ḥaz̤rat Ḥasan Raz̤ā Barelvī kī nʻat goʾī aur un ke divān-i zoq-i nʻat par nāqadānah naẓar
- Auranzeb-Khutut ke Ayenah Mae
- Aʻlā Ḥaz̤rat Imām Ahl-i Sunnat Maulānā Shāh Ḥāfiz Aḥmad Raz̤ā K̲h̲ān̲ Raz̤ā ke naʻtiyah kalām kā taḥqīqī aur adabī jāʾizah (LCCN 77-930773)

=== Translation works ===
- Awaarif-ul-muwaarif (translation) by Shaikh-ul-Shuyukh Shihabuddin al-Suhrawardi
- Al-Ghunya li-talibi tariq al-haqq wa al-din (translation) by Shaikh Abdul-Qadir Gilani
- Nafahat al Uns (translation) by Shaikh Nuruddin Jami
- Sad Maktubat (translation) by Shaikh Muniri
- Tareekh-ul-Khulufaa (translation) by Imam al-Suyuti
- Imām Aḥmad Raz̤ā kī ḥāshiyah nigārī/jāʼizah nigār (translation) by Imam Ahmad Raza Khan (LCCN 85-930203)
- Qadiri Ridwi Majmu’ah Wazaaif (translation) by Shaykh Iqbal Nuri
- Ruq'at-e-Alamgir (translation) by Alamgir I
- Mukāshafat al-qulūb (translation) by Imam al-Ghazali
- Kitābulḥaqūq o kitābuṣṣidq (translation) by Imam al-Ghazali
