= Lodi (Pashtun tribe) =

Lodi Pashtun tribe in Afghanistan and Pakistan

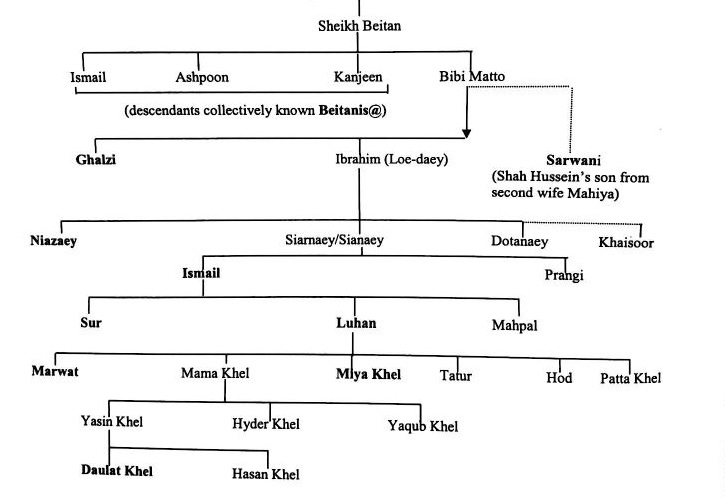
- The list of Lodi sub-tribes

Lodi (Pashto: لودهی) is a Pashtun tribe of the Bettani Pashtun confederacy. It consists of a number of sub-tribes, most of which are settled in the Tank, Lakki Marwat and Dera Ismail Khan districts of Khyber Pakhtunkhwa, with smaller population found in Punjab and Azad Kashmir. These tribes were nomadic for most of their history and migrated to their present-day locations by crossing the Gomal Pass throughout different times.

Two sub-tribes among the Lodi established their own empires: the Sur tribe established the Sur dynasty and the Prangi tribe established the Lodi dynasty.

== Historical mentions of sub-tribes ==
=== Shahu Khel ===
Ain-i-Akbari mentions that Bahlol Lodi belonged to the Shahu Khel tribe. It says that Bahlol's grandfather, Malik Bahram, settled in Multan during the reign of Mahmud Shah II Tughlaq, while Tarikh-i-Firishta mentions this migration took place during the reign of Firuz Shah Tughlaq. Tarikh-i-Firoz Shahi records an Afghan named Shahu who in 1341, during the reign of Muhammad bin Tughluq, killed the governor of Multan, gathered a following of Afghans, and launched a rebellion. When Shahu learned that the Sultan was marching toward Multan to suppress the revolt, he once again proclaimed his allegiance to the Sultan and fled toward Afghanistan. Ibn Battuta in his Rihla also recounts this rebellion.

=== Lohani ===
Lohani, also known as Nuhani, is the largest sub-group among the Lodi tribe. The Lohani migrated and crossed the Gomal Pass en masse during the late 1500s, into present-day Lodi territory, and displaced other Lodi tribes such as Sur and Prangi that had settled in the region in prior times. Other Lohani tribes had also made earlier deeper incursions into India, as far as Bihar, and settled therein during the days of the Lodi dynasty.

The earliest mention of the Lohani tribes comes in the form of an inscription written on a tablet from 1496 in Bihar during the days of the Lodi dynasty. The inscription records the construction of a certain gate by Darya Khan Nuhani who is thereafter mentioned as one of the ''governors of the kingdom". The Lohani tribes were also mentioned by the Mughal Emperor Babur in his memoirs, the Baburnama, as Nuhani Afghans around 1529. The earliest records mentions them as Nuhani rather than Lohani, which is the primary designation by which they are currently known today.

=== Sur and Niazi ===
When Babur passed from Bangash territory into Bannu in the early 16th century, he recorded that the plain was cultivated by several Afghan tribes, including the Sur and the Niazi. This early reference places the Sur and the Niazi tribes among the established tribal communities of the region in Babur's time.
