= Bareilly district =

- District
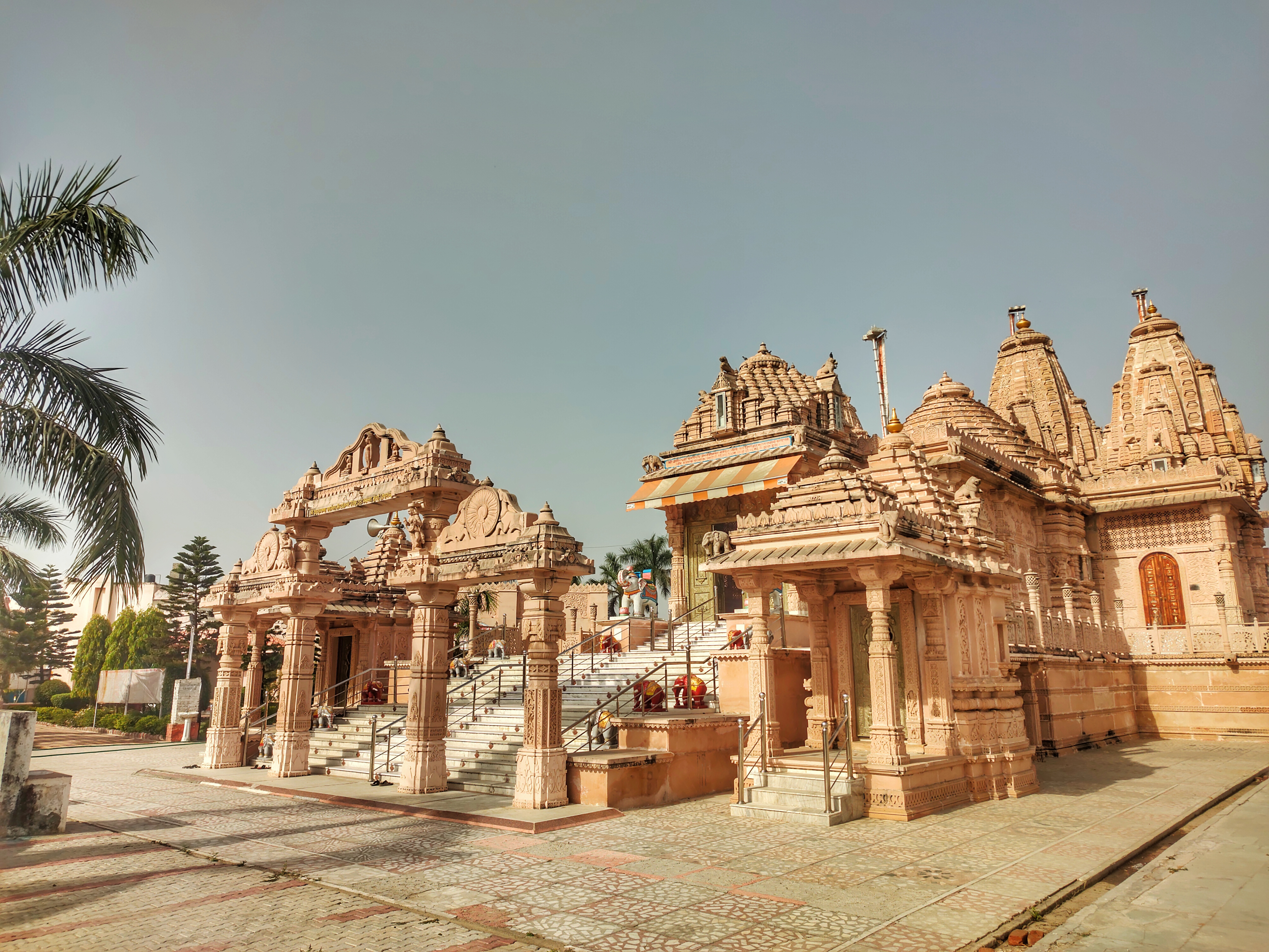
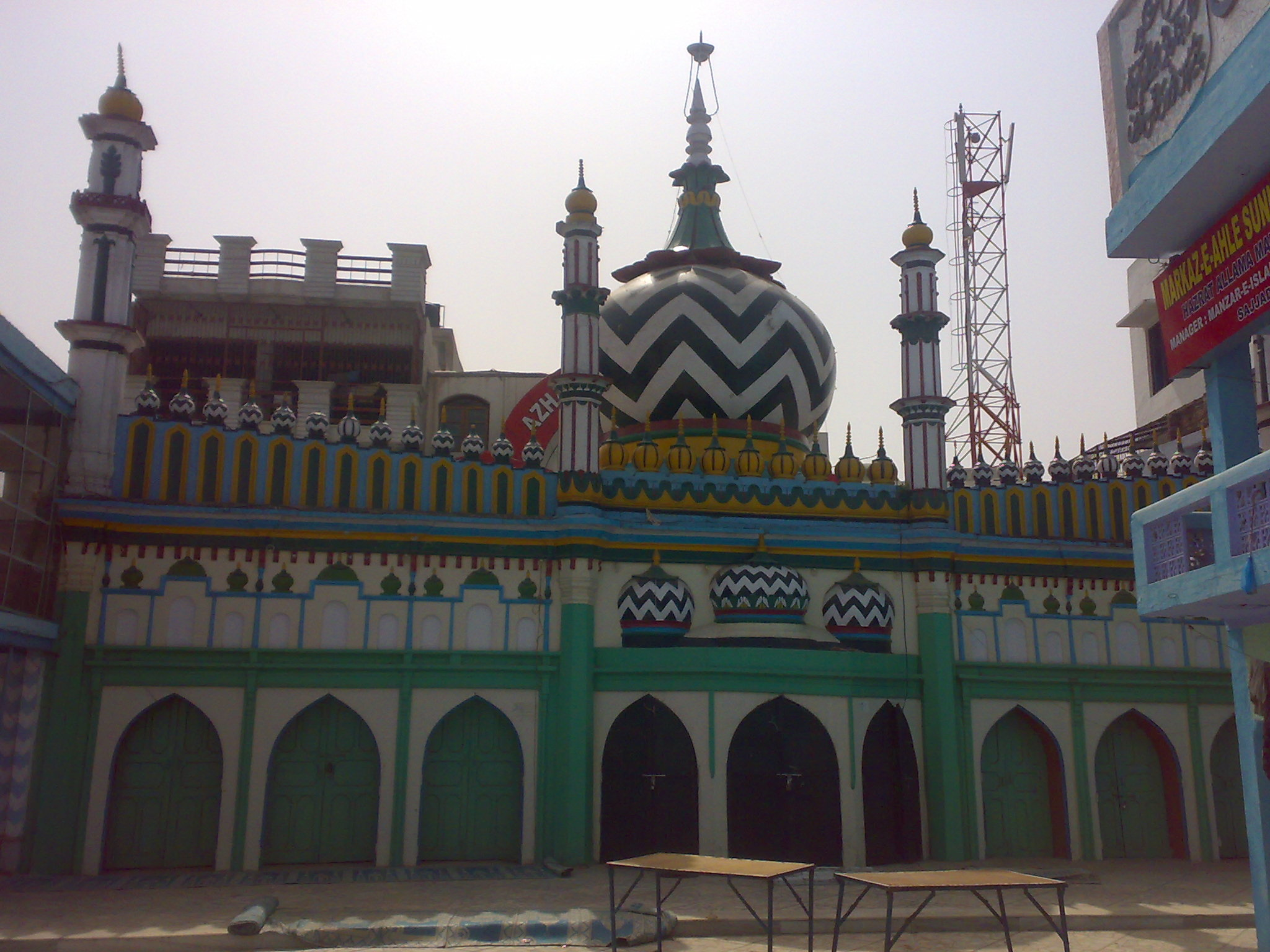
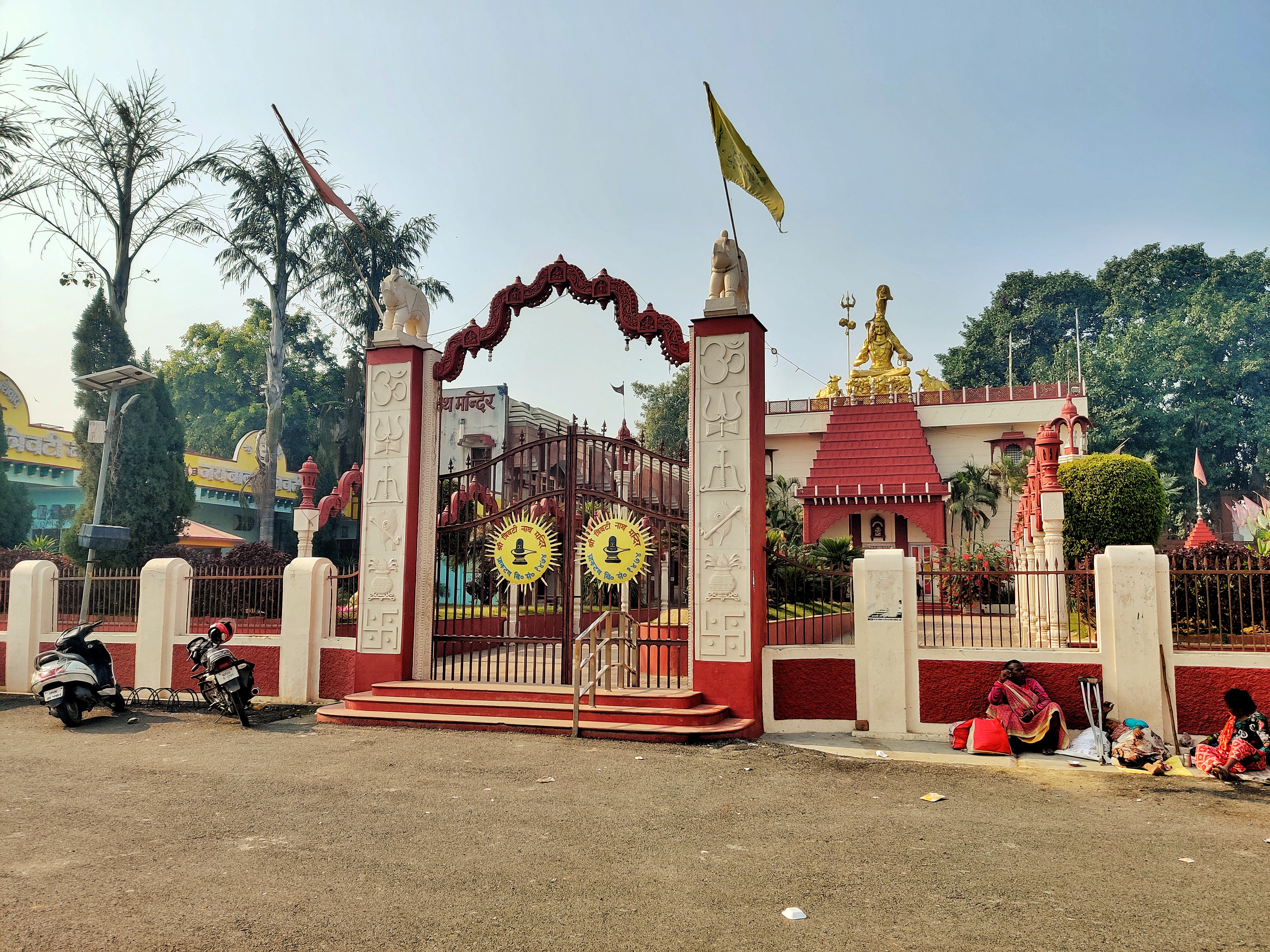
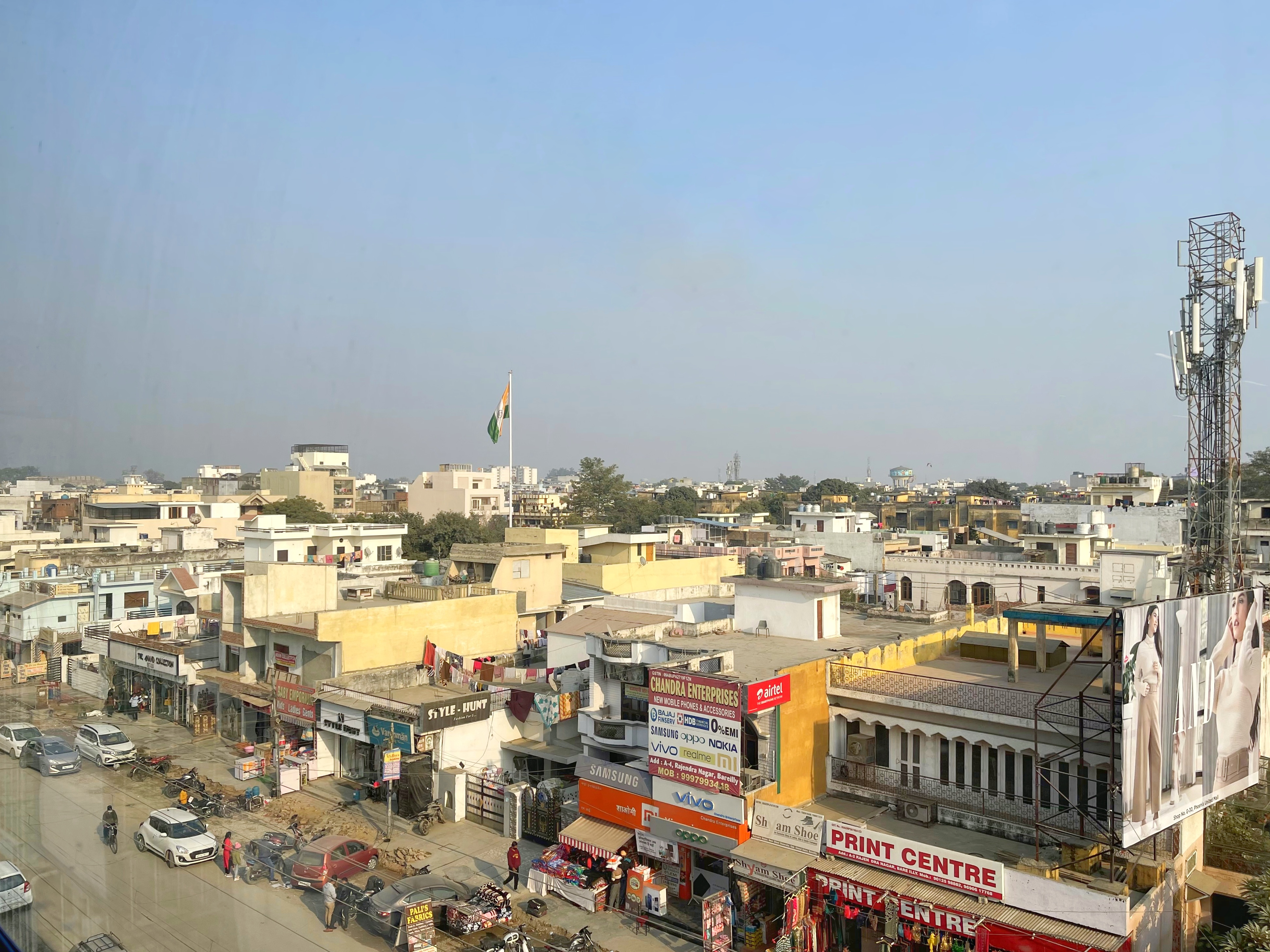
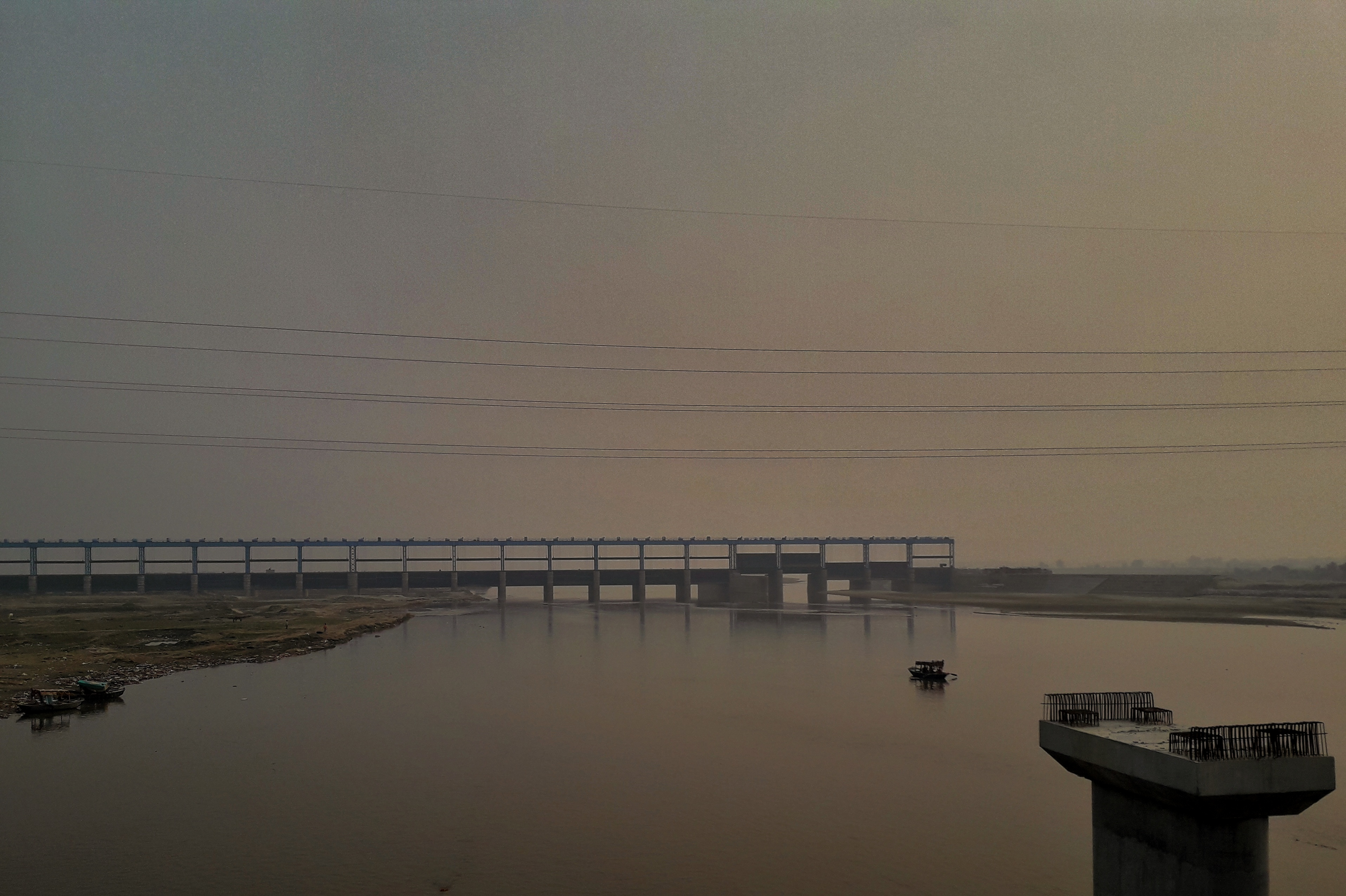
- Clockwise from top-left: Ahichchhatra Jain temples, shrine of Imam Ahmad Raza, skyline of Rajendra Nagar in Bareilly, Ramganga, Trivatinath Temple

- Location of Bareilly district in Uttar Pradesh
- Country: India
- State: Uttar Pradesh
- Division: Bareilly
- Headquarters: Bareilly

Government
  - Lok Sabha constituencies: Bareilly, Aonla (partly)

Area
  - Total: 4,120 km^{2} (1,590 sq mi)

Population (2011)
  - Total: 4,448,359
  - Density: 1,080/km^{2} (2,800/sq mi)
  - Urban: 1,568,409

Demographics
  - Literacy: 85%
- Time zone: UTC+05:30 (IST)
- Website: bareilly.nic.in

Bareilly district (Hindi pronunciation: [bəɾeːliː]) belongs to the state Uttar Pradesh in northern India. Its capital is Bareilly city and it is divided into six administrative divisions or tehsils: Aonla, Baheri, Bareilly city, Faridpur, Mirganj, and Nawabganj. The Bareilly district is a part of the Bareilly Division and occupies an area of 4120 km^{2} with a population of 4,448,359 people (previously it was 3,618,589) according to the census of 2011.

The modern City of Bareilly was founded by Mukrand Rai in 1657. Later it became the capital of the Rohilkhand region before getting handed over to Nawab Vazir of Awadh and then to the East India Company, becoming an integral part of India.

== History ==
=== Ancient period ===
Historically, the region was the capital of the ancient kingdom of Panchala. The Panchalas occupied the country to the east of the Kurus, between the upper Himalayas and the river Ganges. The country was divided into Uttara-Panchala and Dakshina-Panchala. The northern Panchala had its capital at Ahichatra (also known as Adhichhatra and Chhatravati, near present-day Aonla) tehsil of Bareilly district, while southern Panchala had it capital at Kampilya or Kampil in Farrukhabad district. The famous city of Kannauj or Kanyakubja was situated in the kingdom of Panchala. According to the epic Mahābhārata, Bareilly region (Panchala, in present - day Uttar Pradesh and nearby regions) is said to be the birthplace of Draupadi, who was also referred to as 'Panchali'.

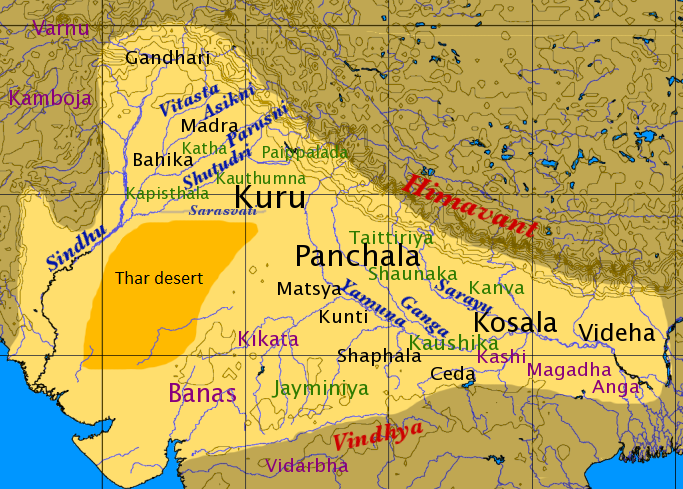
The position of the Panchala kingdom in Iron Age Vedic India.

The last two Panchala clans, the Somakas and the Srinjayas are mentioned in the Mahabharata and the Puranas. King Drupada, whose daughter Draupadi was married to the Pandavas belonged to the Somaka clan. However, the Mahabharata and the Puranas consider the ruling clan of the northern Panchala as an offshoot of the Bharata clan. Divodasa, Sudas, Srinjaya, Somaka and Drupada (also called Yajnasena) were the most notable rulers of this clan.

During 176 – 166 BC, Panchala coins were minted at Bareilly and the surrounding areas. It was the Kushan and Gupta kings who established mints here. The city's continued status as a mint town since the beginning of the Christian era was helped by the fact that Bareilly was never a disturbed area (except at the time of the Indian Independence Struggle).

Found at Ganga Ghati in abundance were the Adi Vigraha and Shree Vigraha coins of the Pratihara Kings that were minted here between the 4th to the 9th centuries. Dating to this period are also the silver coins – similar to those of Firoz Second – known as Indo-Sasanian.

=== Medieval period ===
After the fall of the Kingdom of Panchala, the city was under the rule of local rulers.

According to British historian Matthew Atmore Sherring the district of Bareilly was formerly a dense jungle inhabited by a race of Ahirs and was called Tappa Ahiran.

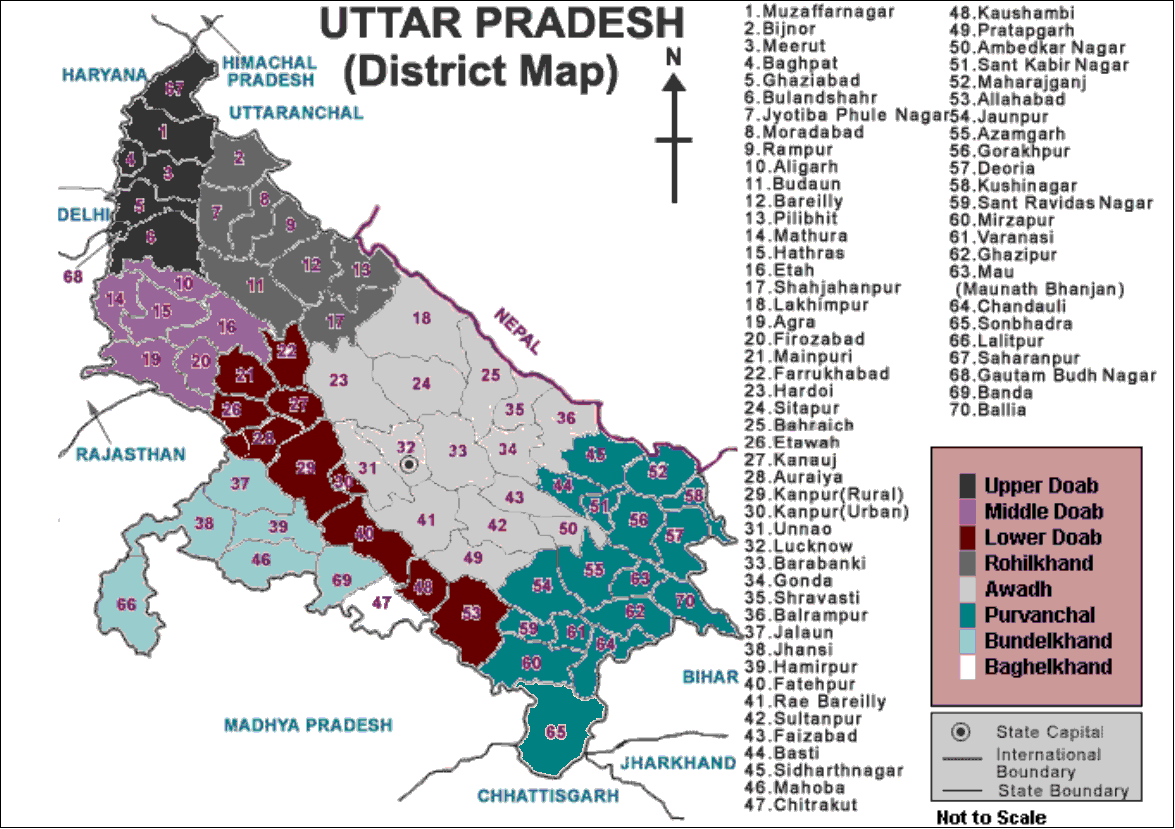
Regions of Uttar Pradesh including Rohilkhand(with Bareilly as its capital)

In 1623 two Afghan brothers of the Barech tribe, Shah Alam and Husain Khan, settled in the region, bringing with them a number of other Pashtun settlers. The Rohilla Daud Khan was awarded the Katehr region in the then northern India by Mughal emperor Aurangzeb Alamgir (ruled 1658–1707) to suppress Rajput uprisings, which had afflicted this region. Originally, some 20,000 soldiers from various Pashtun Tribes (Yusafzais, Ghoris, Lodis, Ghilzai, Barech, Marwat, Durrani, Tanoli, Tarin, Kakar, Khattak, Afridi and Baqarzai) were hired by Mughals to provide soldiers to the Mughal armies and this was appreciated by Aurangzeb Alamgir, an additional force of 25,000 men was given respected positions in Mughal army. However most of them settled in the Katehar region during Nadir Shah's invasion of northern India in 1739 increasing their population up to 100,0000. Due to the large settlement of Rohilla Afghans, the Katehar region gained fame as Rohilkhand.

Meanwhile, Ali Mohammed Khan (1737–1749), captured the city of Bareilly and made it his capital, later uniting the Rohillas to form the state of 'Rohilkhand', between 1707 and 1720, making Bareilly his capital. According to 1901 census of India, the total Pathan population in Bareilly District was 40,779, out of a total population of 1,090,117. Their principal clans were the Yusafzais, Ghoris, Lodis, Ghilzai, Barech, Marwat, Durrani, Tanoli, Tarin, Kakar, Khattak, Afridi and Baqarzai. Other important cities were Rampur, Shahjahanpur, Badaun, and others.

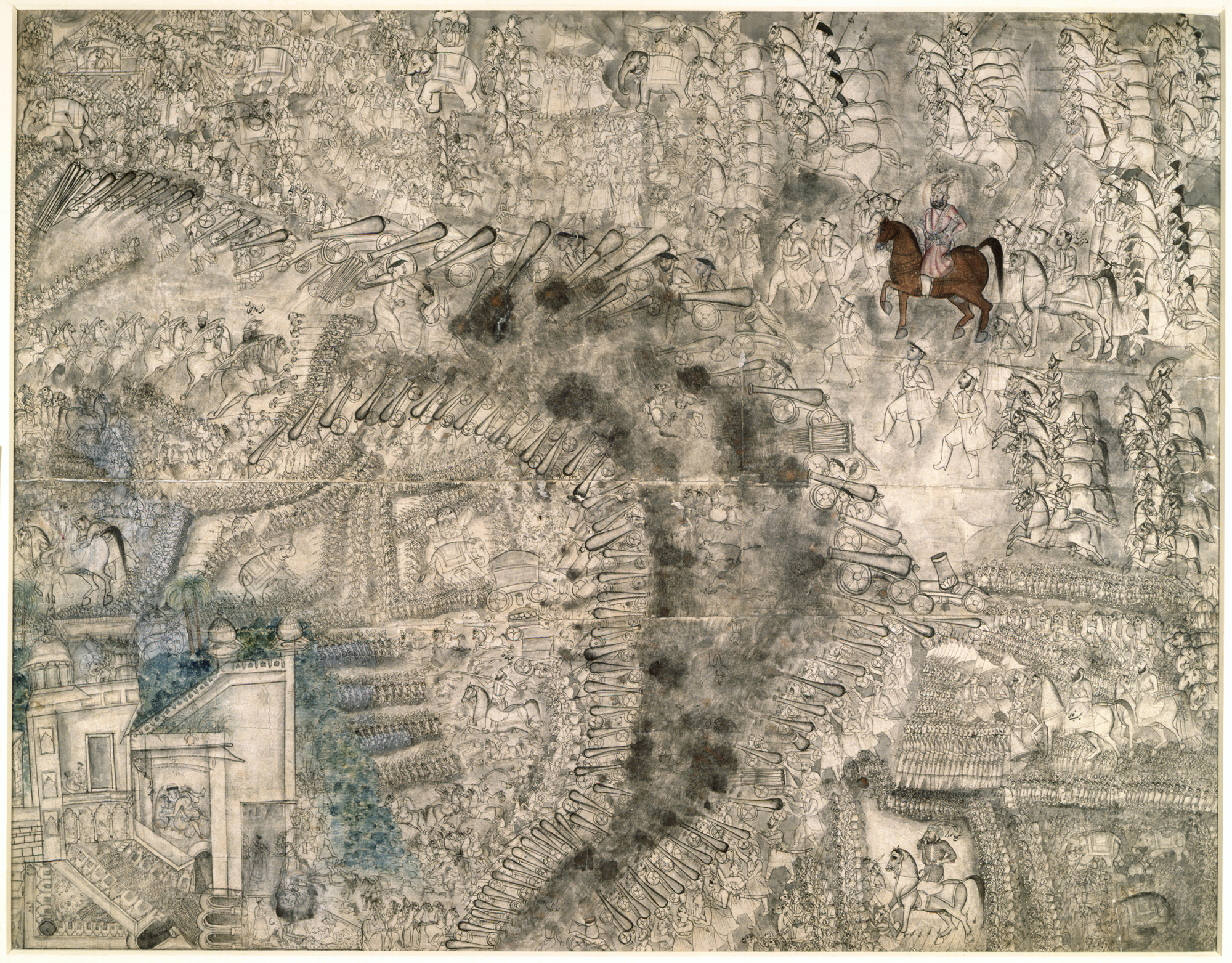
Hafiz Rahmat Khan, standing right to Ahmad Shah Durrani, who is shown on a brown horse.(during The 'Third battle of Panipat') 14 January 1761

Ali Muhammad was succeeded by Hafiz Rahmat Khan Barech (1749–1774), whom he appointed as the regent of Rohilkhand on his deathbed. Hafiz Rahmat Khan Barech extended the power of Rohilkhand from Almora in the North to Etawah in the South-West.

The term Rohilla is derived from the Pashtu Roh, meaning mountain, and literally means a mountain air, and was used by the Baluch and Jats of the Derajat region to refer to the Pashtun mountains tribes of Loralai, Zhob and Waziristan regions. The Rohillas and are men of a taller stature and a fairer complexion than the general inhabitants of the district. The Muslims in the area are chiefly the descendants of Yousafzai Afghans tribe of Pashtuns, called the Rohilla Pathans of the Mandanh sub-section, (but other Pashtuns also became part of the community), who settled in the country about the year 1720. Rohilla's Sardar like Daud Khan, Ali Muhammad Khan, and the legendary Hafiz Rahmat Khan Barech were from the renowned Afghan tribe the Barech, who were originally from the Kandahar Province of Afghanistan. In Uttar Pradesh, it was used for all Pashtuns, except for the Shia Bangashes who settled in the Rohilkhand region, or men serving under Rohilla chiefs. Rohillas were distinguished by their separate language and culture. They spoke Pashto among each other but gradually lost their language over time and now converse in Urdu.

Bishop Heber described them as follows – "The country is burdened with a crowd of lazy, profligate, self-called sawars (cavaliers), who, though many of them are not worth a rupee, conceive it derogatory to their gentility and Pathan blood to apply themselves to any honest industry, and obtain for the most part a precarious livelihood by sponging on the industrious tradesmen and farmers, on whom they levy a sort of blackmail, or as hangers-on to the wealthy and noble families yet remaining in the province. These men have no visible means of maintenance, and no visible occupation except that of lounging up and down with their swords and shields, like the ancient Highlanders, whom in many respects they much resemble."

Rohilkhand (under Hafiz Rahmat Khan Barech) was on the winning side at the Third Battle of Panipat of 1761 and successfully blocked the expansion of the Maratha Empire into north India. In 1772 Rohilkhand was invaded by the Marathas; however the Nawabs of Awadh came to the aid of the Rohillas in repulsing the invasion. After the war Nawab Shuja-ud-Daula demanded payment for their help from the Rohilla chief, Hafiz Rahmat Khan Barech. When the demand was refused the Nawab joined with the British under Governor Warren Hastings and his Commander-in-Chief, Alexander Champion, to invade Rohilkhand. Hafiz Rahmat Khan Barech was killed in the ensuing battle at Miranpur Katra in 1774.

Nawab Saadat Ali Khan surrendered Rohilkhand to the East India Company by the treaty of 10 November 1801.

During this period too, Bareilly retained its status as a mint. Emperor Akbar and his descendants minted gold and silver coins at mints in Bareilly. The Afghan conqueror Ahmed Shah Durani too minted gold and silver coins at the Bareilly mint.

During the time of Shah Alam II, Bareilly was the headquarters of Rohilla Sardar Hafiz Rehmat Khan and many more coins were issued. After that, the city was in possession of Awadh Nawab Asaf-ud-Daulah. The coins that he issued had Bareilly, Bareilly Aasfabad, and Bareilly kite and fish as identification marks. After that, the minting of coins passed on to the East India Company.

The Rohillas, after fifty years' precarious independence, were subjugated in 1774 by the confederacy of British troops with the Nawab of Oudh's army, which formed a charge against Warren Hastings. Their territory was in that year annexed to Oudh. In 1801 the Nawab of Oudh ceded it to the Company in commutation of the subsidy money.

=== Modern period ===
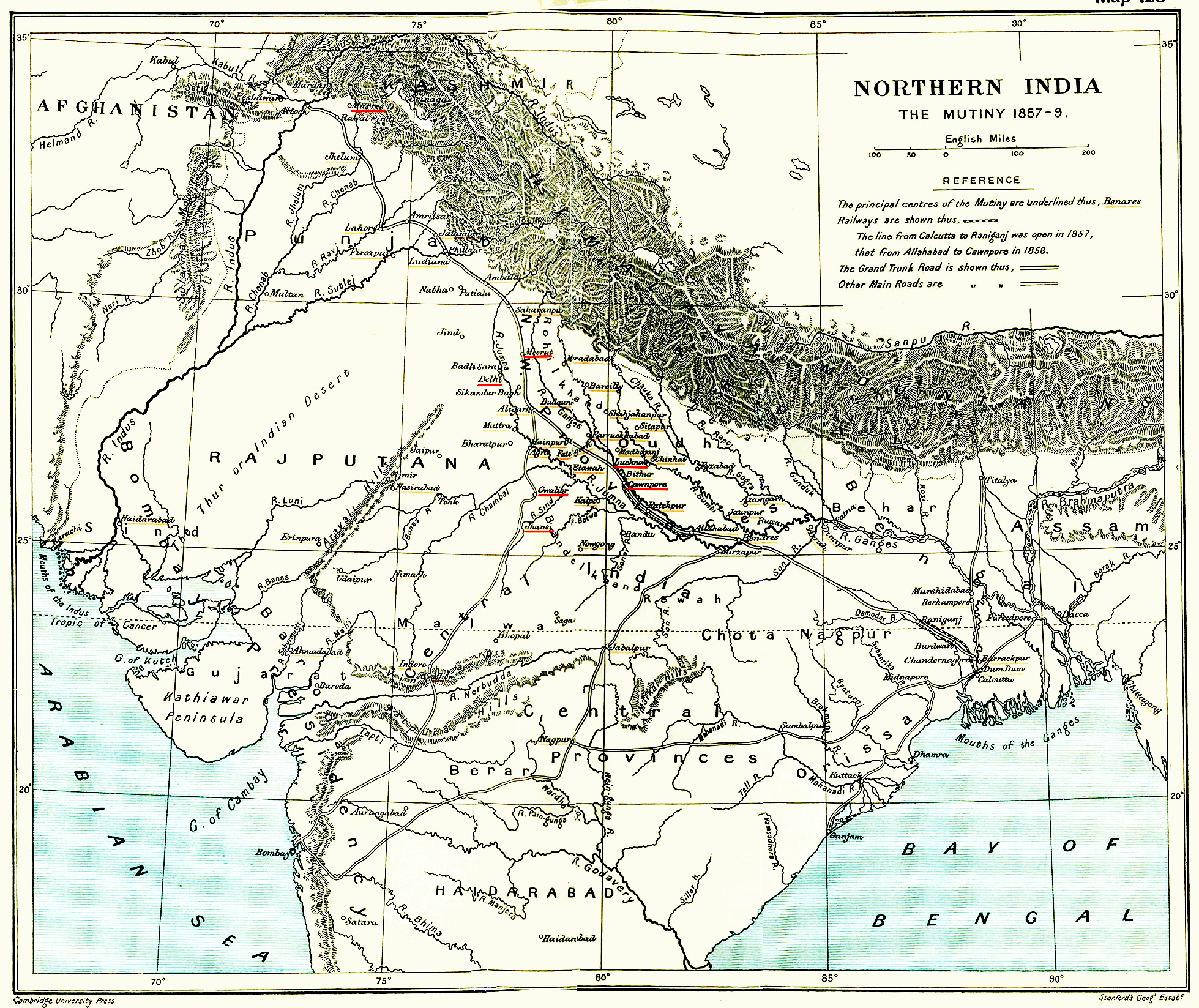
A 1912 map of 'Northern India The Revolt of 1857–59' showing the centres of rebellion including the principal ones: Meerut, Delhi, Bareilly, (Kanpur), Lucknow, Jhansi, and Gwalior

Bareilly (Rohilkhand) was a major centre during the Indian Rebellion of 1857 (also known as India's First War of Independence).

It began as a mutiny of native soldiers (sepoys) employed by the British East India Company's army, against perceived race based injustices and inequities, on 10 May 1857, in the town of Meerut, and soon erupted into other mutinies and civilian rebellions which were mainly centred on north central India along the several major river valleys draining the south face of the Himalayas [See red annotated locations on Map at right] but with local episodes extending both northwest to Peshawar on the north-west frontier with Afghanistan and southeast beyond Delhi.

There was a widespread popular revolt in multiple areas such as Awadh, Bundelkhand and Rohilkhand. The rebellion was therefore more than just a military rebellion, and it spanned more than one region. The communal hatred led to communal riots in a number of parts of U.P. The green flag was hoisted and Muslims in Bareilly, Bijnor, Moradabad and other places the Muslims shouted for the revival of Muslim kingdom.

The main conflict occurred largely in the upper Gangetic plain and central India, with the major hostilities confined to present-day Uttar Pradesh, Bihar, northern Madhya Pradesh, and the Delhi region. The rebellion posed a considerable threat to British East Indian Company power in that region, and it was contained only with the fall of Gwalior on 20 June 1858. Some regard the rebellion as the first of several movements over ninety years to achieve independence, which was finally achieved in 1947.

During the Mutiny of 1857 the Rohillas took an active part against the English, but since then they had been disarmed. During the First War of Indian Independence in 1857, Khan Bhadur Khan issued silver coins from Bareilly as an independent ruler. These coins are a novelty as far as the numismatist is concerned.

The population in 1901 was 1,090,117. Bareilly, also, was the headquarters of a brigade in the 7th division of the eastern army corps in British period.

== Geography ==
Bareilly is located at 28°10′N, 78°23′E, and lies in northern India. It borders Pilibhit and Shahjahanpur on East and Rampur on west, Udham Singh Nagar (Uttarakhand) in North and Badaun in South. It is a level terrain, watered by a number of streams, the general slope being towards the south. The soil is fertile and highly cultivated, groves of noble trees abound, and the villages have a neat, prosperous look. A tract of forest jungle called the tarai stretches along the extreme north of the district and teems with large game such as tigers, bears, deer and wild pigs. The river Sarda or Gogra forms the eastern boundary of the district and is the principal stream. Next in importance is the Ramganga, which receives as its tributaries most of the hill torrents of the Kumaon mountains. The Deoha is another great drainage artery and receives multiple minor streams. The Gomati or Gumti also passes through the district.

== Demographics ==
Historical population
Year	Pop.	±% p.a.
1901	1,089,874	—
1911	1,094,419	+0.04%
1921	1,013,649	−0.76%
1931	1,072,140	+0.56%
1941	1,175,935	+0.93%
1951	1,268,950	+0.76%
1961	1,478,490	+1.54%
1971	1,779,867	+1.87%
1981	2,273,030	+2.48%
1991	2,834,616	+2.23%
2001	3,618,589	+2.47%
2011	4,448,359	+2.09%

According to the 2011 census Bareilly district has a population of 4,448,359, roughly equal to the nation of Croatia or the US state of Louisiana. This gives it a ranking of 39th in India (out of a total of 640). The district has a population density of 1,084 inhabitants per square kilometre (2,810/sq mi). Its population growth rate over the decade 2001–2011 was 23.4%. Bareilly has a sex ratio of 883 females for every 1000 males, and a literacy rate of 60.52%. 35.26% of the population lives in urban areas. Scheduled Castes make up 12.52% of the population.

=== Religion ===
Religions in Bareilly district (2011)
Religion	Percent
Hinduism	63.64%
Islam	34.54%
Sikhism	0.63%
Other or not stated	1.19%
Distribution of religions

Hindus form 63.6% of population. Islam is a significant minority. Bareilly is the seat of one of the most important modern Islamic revival movements in India, the Barelvis. The Barelvi madrassas mobilised Islamic scholars across the country to issue a joint Fatwa against the Islamic State. There is a Roman Catholic Diocese of Bareilly.

=== Languages ===
Languages of Bareilly district (2011)
1. Hindi (90.8%)
2. Urdu (8.48%)
3. Others (0.76%)

At the time of the 2011 Census of India, 90.76% of the population in the district spoke Hindi, 8.48% Urdu and 0.47% Punjabi as their first language.

== Administrative divisions ==
The Bareilly district has six tehsils namely, Aonla, Baheri, Bareilly (Sadar), Faridpur, Meerganj and Nawabganj.

== Notable people ==
=== Minister in UP Govt ===
- Arun Kumar – Politician

Forest Minister Second Yogi Adityanath ministry.

=== Other ===
- Ahmad Raza Khan Barelvi – Islamic scholar
- Shamsul-hasan Shams Barelvi – Pakistani Islamic scholar and translator
- Santosh Gangwar – Governor, Jharkhand
- Rajesh Agarwal – Treasurer, Bharatiya Janata Party
- Rati Agnihotri – Actress
- Shah Niyaz Ahmad – Sufi mystic and preacher
- Paras Arora – Actor
- Wasim Barelvi – Urdu poet
- Clementina Butler – Evangelist and author
- Clementina Rowe Butler – Missionary
- Priyanka Chopra – Actress
- Kanan Gill – Actor, comedian
- Mahmud al-Hasan – Sunni Deobandi Islamic scholar
- Anwar Jamal – Documentary film maker
- Kritika Kamra – Actress
- Akhtar Raza Khan – Islamic scholar
- Hamid Raza Khan – Islamic scholar
- Hassan Raza Khan – Indian scholar and poet
- Kaif Raza Khan – Islamic scholar and activist
- Tauqeer Raza Khan – Politician
- Hiba Nawab – Actress
- Disha Patani – Indian Actress
- Gopal Swarup Pathak – Former Vice-President of India
- Percy Pratt – First-class cricketer
- Sunita Rajwar - Actress
- Mustafa Raza Khan Qadri – Islamic scholar
- Priyanka Singh Rawat – Member of Parliament, Barabanki
- Clayton Robson – Cricketer
- Kavita Seth – Playback singer
- Dharmpal Singh – Politician

== Economy ==
Bareilly is a category "A" district i.e. having socio-economic and basic amenities parameters below the national average.

== Education ==
Rohilkhand University in Bareilly was established in 1975. In August 1997, it was renamed as Mahatma Jyotiba Phule Rohilkhand University. Presently, 80 colleges are affiliated to it.

== See also ==
- History of Bareilly

== Bibliography ==
- Bayly, Christopher Alan (1987), Indian Society and the Making of the British Empire, The New Cambridge History of India, vol. II.1, Cambridge University Press, ISBN 978-0-521-38650-0
- Bose, Sugata; Jalal, Ayesha (2003), Modern South Asia: History, Culture, Political Economy (2nd ed.), London: Routledge, p. 253, ISBN 0-415-30787-2
- Metcalf, Barbara D.; Metcalf, Thomas R. (2006), A Concise History of Modern India (2nd ed.), Cambridge University Press, p. 337, ISBN 0-521-68225-8
- Bandyopadhyay, Sekhara (2004), From Plassey to Partition: A History of Modern India, New Delhi: Orient Longman, p. 523, ISBN 81-250-2596-0
- Brown, Judith M. (1994), Modern India: The Origins of an Asian Democracy (2nd ed.), Oxford University Press, p. 480, ISBN 0-19-873113-2
