= List of sultans of Delhi =

Five dynasties of Delhi Sultanate

Sultan of Delhi
- Sulṯan-i-Dihlī
- Flag

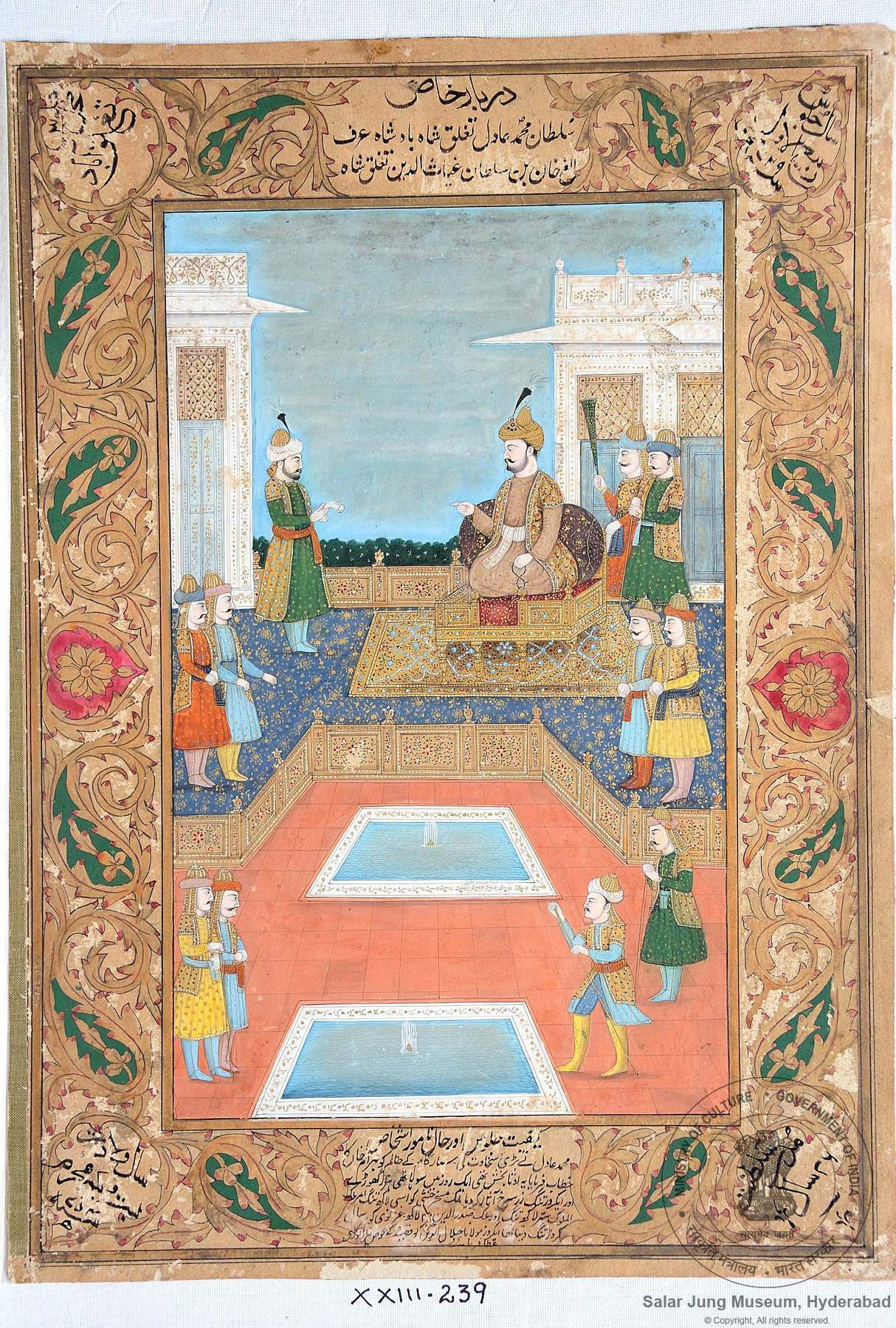
- Muhammad bin Tughlaq; 1 February 1325 – 20 March 1351

Details
- Style: Sultan; Sultan of Sultans; Shah; Ghazi; Khan; Sikander; Malik
- First monarch: Aibak
- Last monarch: Ibrahim Lodi
- Formed: 25 June 1206
- Abolished: 21 April 1526 (319 years)
- Residences: Lahore (1206–1210); Badayun (1210–1214); Delhi (1214–1327, 1334–1506); Daulatabad (1327–1334); Agra (1506–1526)

The Sultan of Delhi was the absolute monarch of the Delhi Sultanate which stretched over large parts of the medieval Indian subcontinent from 1206 to 1526. Following the Ghurid conquest of India, five dynasties ruled over the Sultanate sequentially: the Mamluk dynasty (1206–1290), the Khalji dynasty (1290–1320), the Tughlaq dynasty (1320–1414), the Sayyid dynasty (1414–1451), and the Lodi dynasty (1451–1526). It covered large swaths of territory of modern-day India, Pakistan, and Bangladesh.

This list contains the rulers of Delhi Sultanate in chronological order.

== Mamluk dynasty (1206–1290) ==
No.	Coin	Name	Reign	Life details
1		Aibak قطب ‌الدین ایبک; Qutb ad-Dīn Aibak	25 June 1206 – 14 November 1210 (~4 years)	1150 – 14 November 1210 (aged 60): Mamluk general of Muhammad of Ghor; governor of his Indian holdings.; Declared himself sultan after Muhammad's assassination.; Died after a fall from his horse during polo.
2		Aram آرام شاه; Ārām Shāh	December 1210 – June 1211 (~6 months)	1176 – June 1211 (aged 35): Possibly son of Aibak; defeated by Iltutmish.
3		Iltutmish شمس الدین التتمش; Shams ad-Dīn Iltutmish	June 1211 – 30 April 1236 (~25 years)	1192 – 30 April 1236 (aged 44): Mamluk general and son-in-law of Aibak; moved the capital to Delhi (1214).; Received formal recognition from caliph al-Mustansir (1229).
4		Firuz I رکن الدین فیروز; Rukn ad-Dīn Fīrūz	30 April 1236 – 19 November 1236 (~7 months)	1211 – 19 November 1236 (aged 25): Son of Iltutmish; deposed and killed by nobility.
5		Razia جلالة الدین رضیه; Jalālat ud-Dīn Razia	November 1236 – 20 April 1240 (~3 years)	1205 – 15 October 1240 (aged 35): Daughter and original heir of Iltutmish.; Overthrown and killed by nobility.
6		Bahram معز الدین بهرام; Muʿizz ad-Dīn Bahrām	20 April 1240 – 15 May 1242 (~2 years)	9 July 1212 – 15 May 1242 (aged 29): Son of Iltutmish; installed, controlled and eventually killed by nobles.
7		Masud I علاءالدین مسعود ʿAlāʾ ad-Dīn Masʿūd	May 1242 – 10 June 1246 (~4 years)	1227 or 1232 – 10 June 1246 (aged 19 or 14): Son of Firuz I; installed, controlled and eventually killed by nobles.
8		Mahmud I ناصر الدین محمود; Nāṣir ad-Dīn Maḥmūd	10 June 1246 – 18 February 1266 (~20 years)	1229 or 1230 – 18 February 1266 (aged 37 or 36): Son or grandson of Iltutmish; de facto rule by Balban, who possibly had him killed.
9		Balban غیاث الدین بلبن; Ghiyāth ad-Dīn Balban	18 February 1266 – 13 January 1287 (~21 years)	1266 – 13 January 1287 (aged 71): Mamluk of Iltutmish; father-in-law of Mahmud I.; Broke the power of nobility; held off Mongol invasions.; Died of grief over his son's death.
10		Kayqabad معز الدین کیقباد; Muʿizz ad-Dīn Kayqabād	13 January 1287 – 1 February 1290 (~3 years)	1287 – 1 February 1290 (aged 21): Grandson of Balban; installed by nobles as a puppet.; Murdered by the nobility.
11		Kayumars شمس الدین کیومرث; Shams ad-Dīn Kayūmars	1 February 1290 – 13 June 1290 (~4 months)	1285/1287 – 13 June 1290 (aged 3-5): Infant son of Kayqabad; installed as a puppet.; Killed during Khalji seizure of power.

== Khalji dynasty (1290–1320) ==
No.	Coin	Name	Reign	Life details
12		Firuz II جلال الدین فیروز; Jalāl ad-Dīn Fīrūz	13 June 1290 – 19 July 1296 (~6 years)	1220 – 19 July 1296 (aged 76): Noble of Afghan-Turkic descent; seized power after Kayqabad's murder.; Murdered by Muhammad I.
–		Ibrahim رکن الدین ابراهیم; Rukn ad-Dīn Ibrāhīm	19 July 1296 – November 1296 (~4 months)	d. 1297: Young son of Firuz II; titular ruler under his mother's regency.
13		Muhammad I علاء الدین محمد ʿAlāʾ ad-Dīn Muḥammad	19 July 1296 – 4 January 1316 (~19 years)	1266 – 4 January 1316 (aged 50): Nephew and son-in-law of Firuz II; took power after murdering him.; Repelled Mongol invasions; conquest of Deccan and South India under Malik Kafur.
14		Omar شهاب الدین عمر; Shihāb ad-Dīn ʿUmar	5 January 1316 – 14 April 1316 (~3 months)	1310 or 1311 – 14 April 1316 (aged 6 or 5): Son of Muhammad I; installed by Malik Kafur as a child figurehead.; Deposed and exiled after Kafur's overthrow.
15		Mubarak I قطب الدین مبارک; Quṭb ad-Dīn Mubārak	14 April 1316 – 1 May 1320 (~4 years)	1299 – 9 July 1320 (aged 21): Son of Muhammad I; imprisoned by Kafur before being released and overthrowing him.; Briefly regent for Omar, before deposing him.; Assassinated by Khusrau Khan.
16		Khusrau ناصر الدین خسرو; Nāṣir ad-Dīn Khusrau	10 July 1320 – 5 September 1320 (~2 months)	d. 1320: Non-dynastic; a court favorite of Mubarak I; murdered him, before being killed himself.

== Tughluq dynasty (1320–1413) ==
No.	Coin	Name	Reign	Life details
17		Tughluq I غیاث الدین تغلق; Ghiyāth ad-Dīn Tughluq	8 September 1320 – 1 February 1325 (~4 years)	d. 1 February 1325: Governor under Mubarak I; took power after defeating Khusrau.; Died in a accident, with suspicions of foul play by his son.
18		Muhammad II فخر الدین محمد; Fakhr ad-Dīn Muḥammad	1 February 1325 – 20 March 1351 (~26 years)	c. 1290 – 20 March 1351 (aged c. 61): Son of Tughluq I; succeeded him after his death.; Forced and failed relocation of capital to Daulatabad (1327); failed attempt at creating a token currency.
19		Firuz III ناصر الدین فیروز; Nāṣir ad-Dīn Fīrūz	23 March 1351 – 20 September 1388 (~37 years)	1309 – 20 September 1388 (aged 79): Son-in-law of Tughluq I; installed by nobility after Muhammad II died without an heir.
20		Tughluq II غیاث الدین تغلق; Ghiyāth ad-Dīn Tughluq	20 September 1388 – 14 March 1389 (~6 months)	d. 14 March 1389: Great-grandson of Firuz III; assassinated in a palace coup.
21		Abu Bakr ابو بکر شاه; Abū Bakr Shāh	15 March 1389 – 31 August 1390 (~1 year)	d. after 1390: Grandson of Firuz III; installed by nobility.; Deposed by his uncle Muhammad III Shah
22		Muhammad III ناصر الدین محمد; Nāṣir ad-Dīn Muḥammad	31 August 1390 – 20 January 1394 (~3 years)	17 June 1352 – 20 January 1394 (aged 41): Son of Firuz III; took power from Abu Bakr Shah.
23		Sikandar I علاء الدین سکندر ʿAlāʾ ad-Dīn Sikandar	22 January 1394 – 8 March 1394 (~1 month)	d. 8 March 1394: Son of Muhammad III; died of natural causes.
24		Mahmud II ناصر الدین محمود; Nāṣir ad-Dīn Maḥmūd Shāh	8 March 1394 – February 1413 (~19 years)	d. February 1413: Brother of Sikandar I; rule heavily contested by rival Nusrat Shah.; Timurid invasion of India; Sack of Delhi (1398).; Died of natural causes.

== Sayyid dynasty (1414–1451) ==
No.	Coin	Name	Reign	Life details
25		Khizr خضر خان; Khiḍr Khān	28 May 1414 – 20 May 1421 (~7 years)	d. 20 May 1421: Governor of Multan; Took power by overthrowing Sayyid loyalists in Delhi.; Ruled as a deputy of Timur; died of illness.
26		Mubarak II معز الدین مبارک; Muʿizz ad-Dīn Mubārak	21 May 1421 – 19 February 1434 (~13 years)	d. 19 February 1434: Son of Khizr; first Sultan of the dynasty.; Assassinated.
27		Muhammad IV محمد شاه; Muḥammad Shāh	February 1434 – 1 January 1445 (~11 years)	d. 1 January 1445: Grandson of Khizr; installed by nobility as a puppet.; Rise of Bahlul Lodi; died of natural causes.
28		Alam علاءالدین عالم ʿAlāʾ ad-Dīn ʿĀlam	1 January 1445 – 19 April 1451 (~6 years)	d. July 1478: Son of Muhammad IV; actual rule by his ministers.; Ceded Delhi to Bahlul Lodi, ending the dynasty.

== Lodi dynasty (1451–1526) ==
No.	Coin	Name	Reign	Life details
29		Bahlul بهلول خان لودی; Bahlūl Khān Lodī	19 April 1451 – 12 July 1489 (~38 years)	1420 – 12 July 1489 (aged 69): Afghan governor of Punjab; took power from Alam Shah.
30		Sikandar II سکندر خان لودی; Sikandar Khān Lodī	17 July 1489 – 21 November 1517 (~28 years)	17 July 1458 – 21 November 1517 (aged 59): Son of Bahlul Lodi; founded Agra as the new capital.
31		Ibrahim ابراهیم خان لودی; Ibrāhīm Khān Lodī	November 1517 – 21 April 1526 (~8 years)	1480 – 21 April 1526 (aged 46): Son of Sikandar Lodi; mistreated and alienated his nobles, who invited Babur to take the throne.; Defeated and killed at the First Battle of Panipat (1526).; End of Delhi Sultanate; Mughal rule begins.

== Family trees ==
=== Mamluk dynasty (1206-1290) ===
Mamluk dynasty

Qutb ud-Din; Aibak^{(1)} r. 1206-1210
Aram Shah^{(2)} r. 1210-1211
Shams ud-Din; Iltutmish^{(3)} r. 1211-1236
Rukn ud-Din; Firuz^{(4)} r. 1236	Razia; Sultana^{(5)} r. 1236-1240	Muiz ud-Din; Bahram^{(6)} r. 1240-1242	Nasir ud-Din; Mahmud^{(8)} r. 1246-1266
Ala ud-Din; Masud^{(7)} r. 1242-1246	Ghiyath ud-Din; Balban^{(9)} r. 1266-1286
Nasir ud-Din; Bughra Khan
Muiz ud-Din; Qaiqabad^{(10)} r. 1287-1290
Shams ud-Din; Kayumars^{(11)} r. 1290

=== Khalji/Khilji dynasty (1290-1320) ===
Khalji dynasty

Yughrush
Jalal ud-Din; Khalji^{(12)} r. 1290-1296	Shihab ud-Din; Mas'ud
Ala ud-Din; Khalji^{(13)} r. 1296-1316
Shihab ud-Din; Omar^{(14)} r. 1316	Qutb ud-Din; Mubarak^{(15)} r. 1316-1320	Khusrau; Khan^{(16)} r. 1320

=== Tughluq dynasty (1320-1414) ===
Tughluq dynasty

Ghiyath al-Din; Tughluq I^{(17)} r. 1320-1325	Malik Rajab
Muhammad bin Tughluq^{(18)} r. 1325-1351	Firuz Shah; Tughlaq^{(19)} r. 1351-1388
Fateh Khan	Zafar Khan	Nasir ud-Din; Muhammad^{(22)} r. 1390-1394
Ghiyath ud-Din; Tughluq II^{(20)} r. 1388-1389	Abu Bakr; Shah^{(21)} r. 1389-1390	Ala ud-Din; Sikandar^{(23)} r. 1394	Nasir ud-Din; Mahmud^{(24)} r. 1394-1414

=== Sayyid dynasty (1414-1451) ===
Sayyid dynasty

Khizr Khan^{(25)} r. 1414-1421
Mubarak; Shah^{(26)} r. 1421-1434	Farid Khan
Muhammad; Shah^{(27)} r. 1434-1445
Ala ud-Din; Alam Shah^{(28)} r. 1445-1451

=== Lodi dynasty (1451-1526) ===
Lodi dynasty

Bahlul; Khan Lodi^{(29)} r. 1451-1489
Sikandar; Khan Lodi^{(30)} r. 1489-1517
Ibrahim Lodi^{(31)} r. 1517-1526

== Sources ==
- Dynastic Chart, The Imperial Gazetteer of India, v. 2, p. 368.
- "Sayyid dynasty". Encyclopedia Britannica.
- Lodī dynasty - Encyclopædia Britannica
- City List – Delhi Sultanate Rulers, First to Last
- The Delhi Sultanate : How Many Lists of Dynasties and Rulers Delhi Sultanate?

== Other literature ==
- Sen, Sailendra (2013). A Textbook of Medieval Indian History. Primus Books. ISBN 978-9-38060-734-4.
