= Lodi Gardens =

City park in New Delhi

Coordinates: 28.593°N 77.220°E

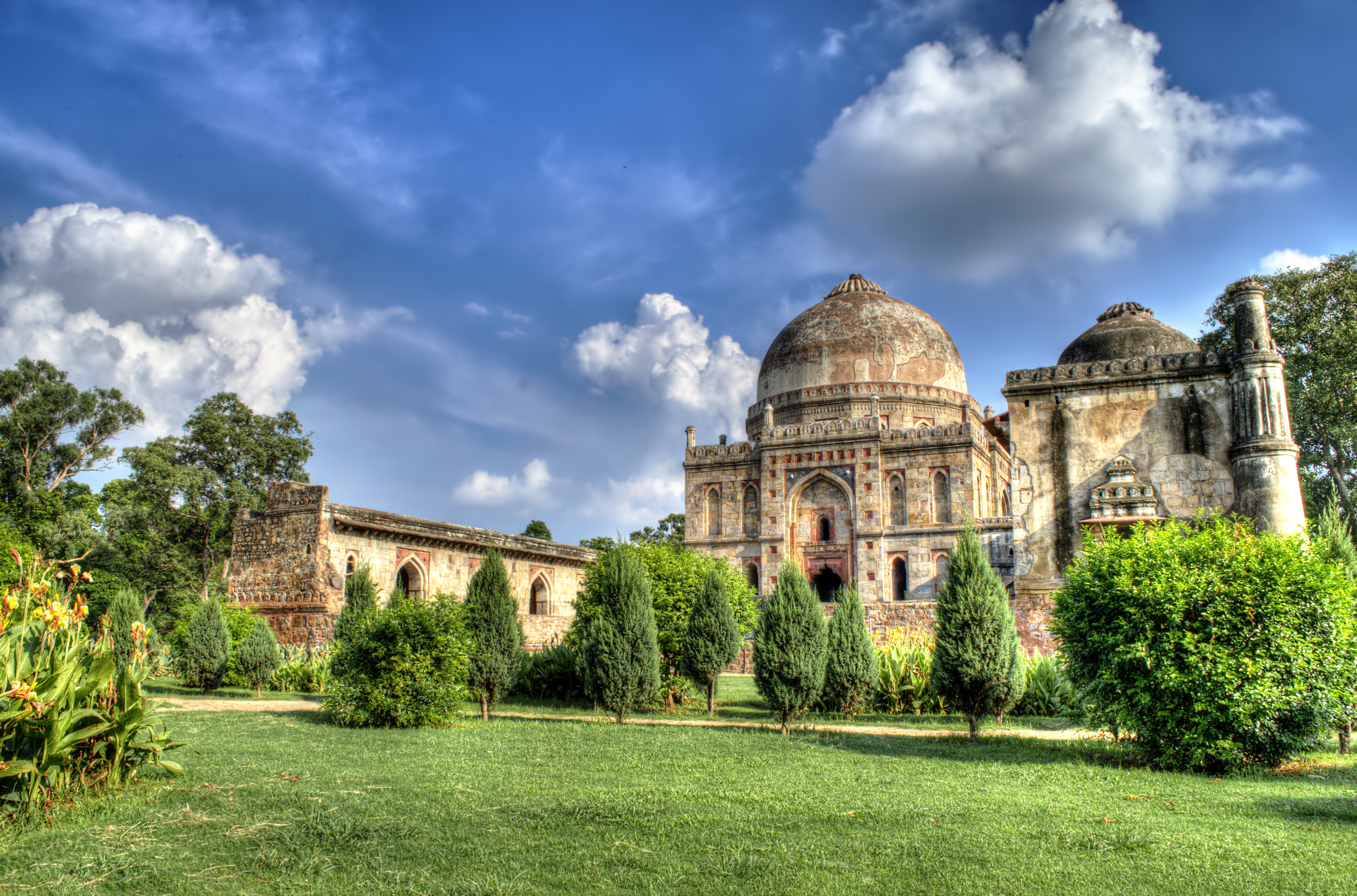
- The Bara Gumbad within the Lodhi gardens

- Location within Delhi
- Type: Public park
- Location: New Delhi, India
- Area: 90 acres (360,000 m^{2})
- Status: Open year round

Lodi Gardens is a city park situated in New Delhi. Spread over 90 acres (360,000 m^{2}), it contains Muhammad Shah's tomb, the tomb of Sikandar Lodi, the Shisha Gumbad and the Bara Gumbad. These monuments date from the late Delhi Sultanate, during the Sayyid dynasty (r. 1414–1451) and Lodi dynasty (r. 1451–1526).

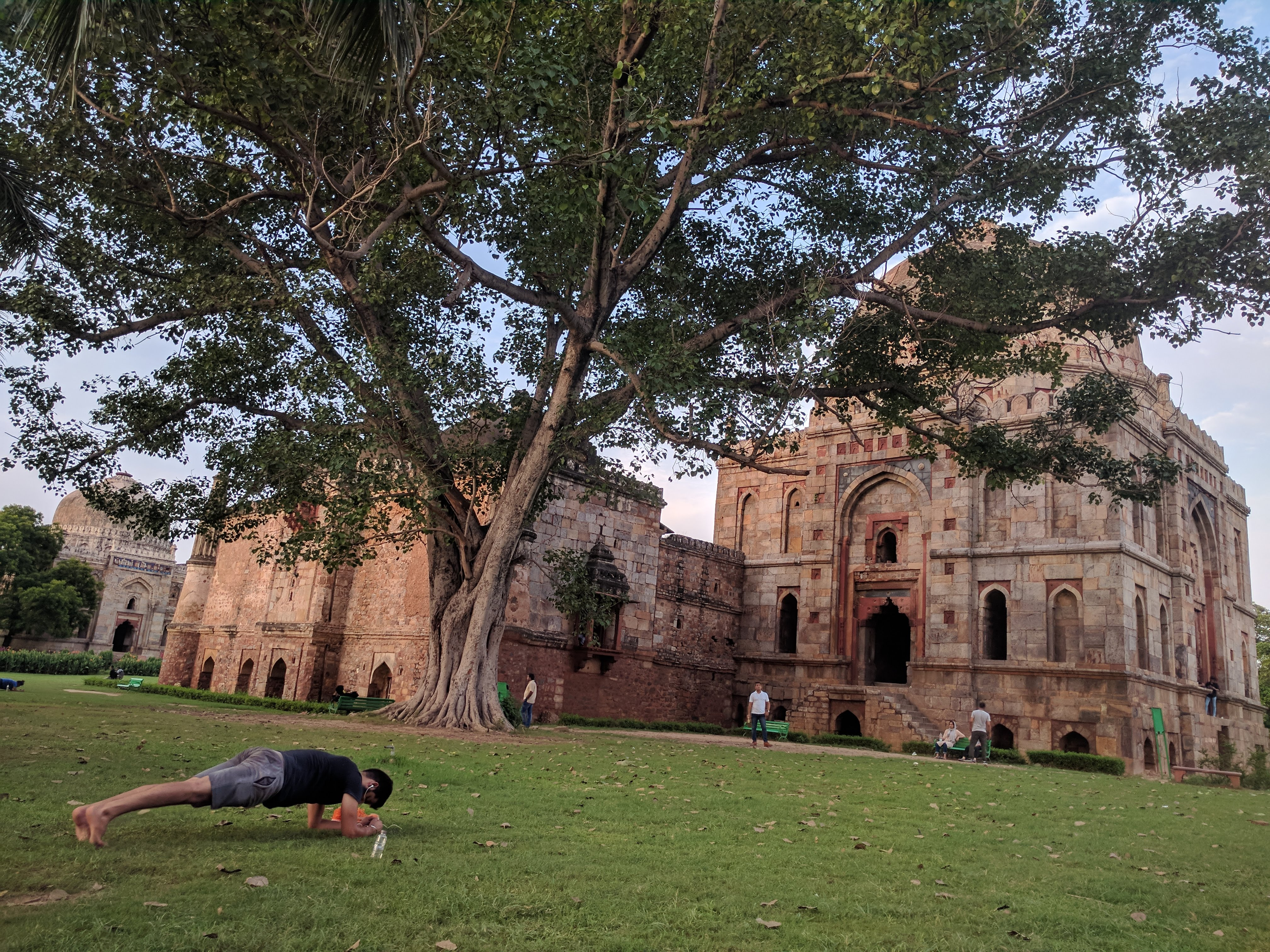
Lodi Gardens is popular for exercise and walking enthusiasts

As there is little architecture dating to the Sayyid and the Lodi periods still standing, Lodi Gardens is an important archaeological site, and is protected by the Archaeological Survey of India (ASI). The gardens are situated between Khan Market and Safdarjung's Tomb on Lodi Road and are a popular spot for morning walks for Delhiites.

== Architecture ==
In the middle of the gardens is the Bara Gumbad (lit. 'big dome'), consisting of a large rubble-construct dome and is not a tomb but was constructed as a gateway to either the attached three domed masjid (mosque) or a large walled enclosure. Both the Bara Gumbad and the mosque were built in 1494 during the reign of Sikander Lodi, there is also a residence surrounding a central courtyard, where the remains of a water tank can be seen. Opposite the Bara Gumbad is the Shish Gumbad (lit. 'glazed dome', for the glazed tiles used in its construction), which contains graves whose occupants are not clearly identifiable – either an unknown family of Sikandar Lodi's court or Bahlul Lodi.

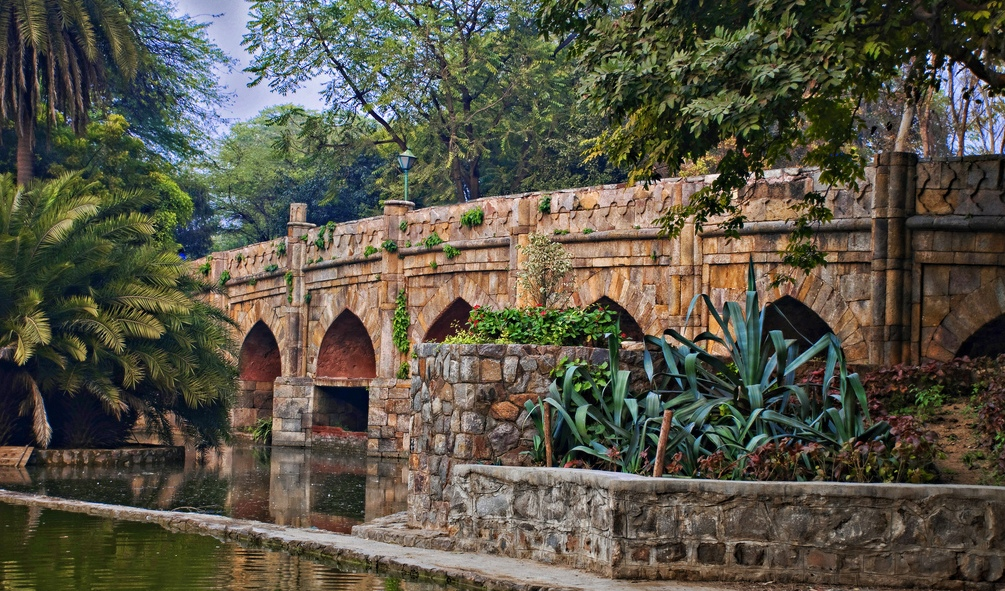
The Athpula ('eight-piered') Bridge in Lodi Gardens

To the north of the garden are the remains of a stream which may once have run as far as the Yamuna River, and by its side is the tomb of Sikandar Lodi. This structure still has the battlements enclosing it. Visible from Sikander's tomb is the Athpula ('eight-piered') Bridge, one of the few monuments in Delhi that was built during the reign of Mughal emperor Akbar. The bridge contains seven arches, with the central one being the largest.

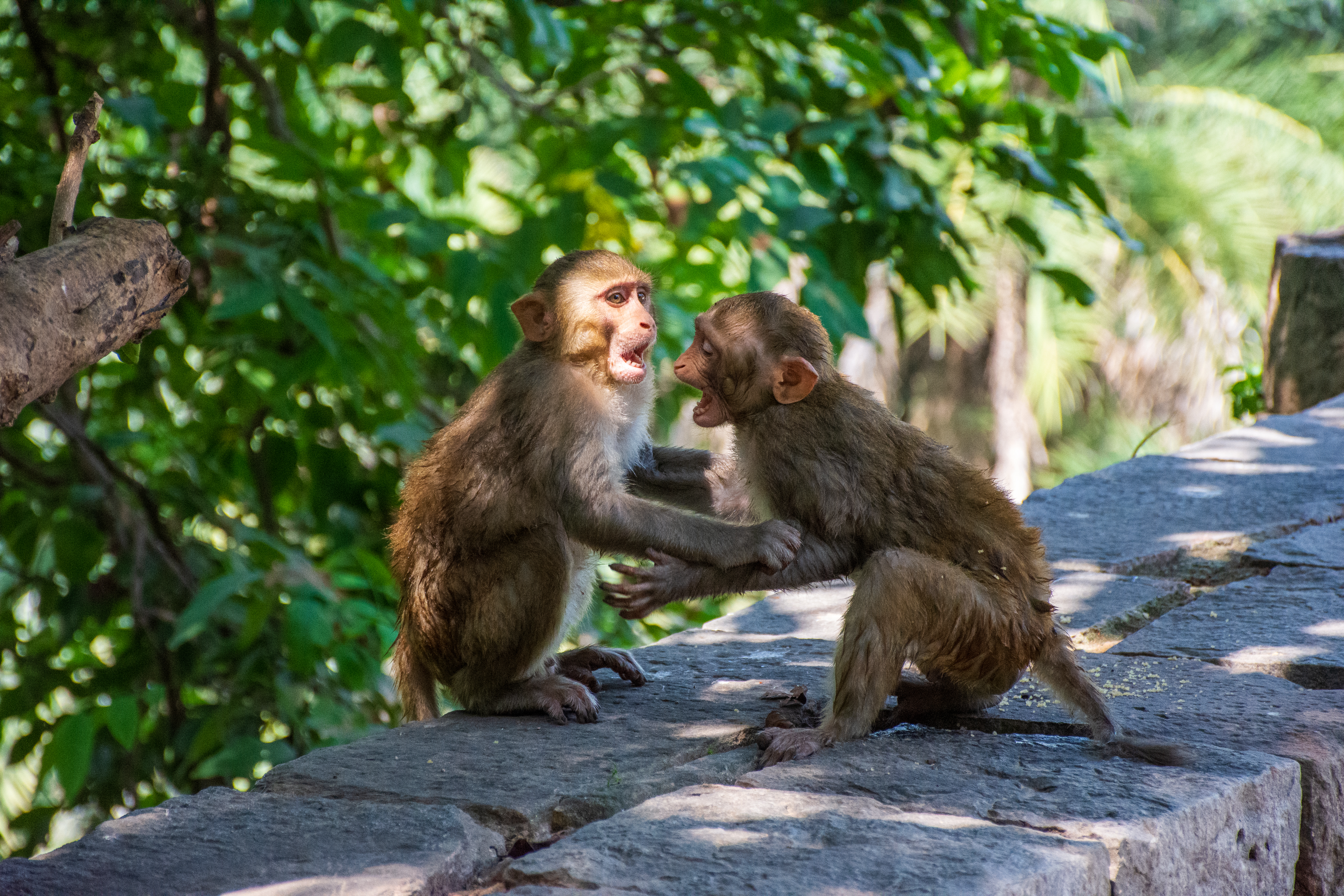
Two Rhesus macaque monkeys play in the Lodhi Gardens

The tomb of Muhammad Shah, the last of the Sayyid dynasty rulers, is the earliest of the tombs in the garden, having been built in 1444 by Muhammad Shah's successor Ala-ud-din Alam Shah. The tomb is octagonal in shape, and is a good example of the inclusion of features from Hindu architecture into Indo-Islamic buildings. Numerous Hindu-style chhatri surround the central dome, each of them capped by a lotus finial with a decorative band around the base. Sloping buttresses at the corners are each topped with an ornamental guldasta (lit. 'bouquet'), and a chhajja overhangs the numerous arches which open onto a veranda. The main tomb is supported by a 16-sided base. It is of a flattened type and the surrounding chhatris make it appear diminutive compared to its substantially larger base. The later tomb of Sikandar Lodi seems to have been copied from this Sayyid tomb.

== Gallery ==
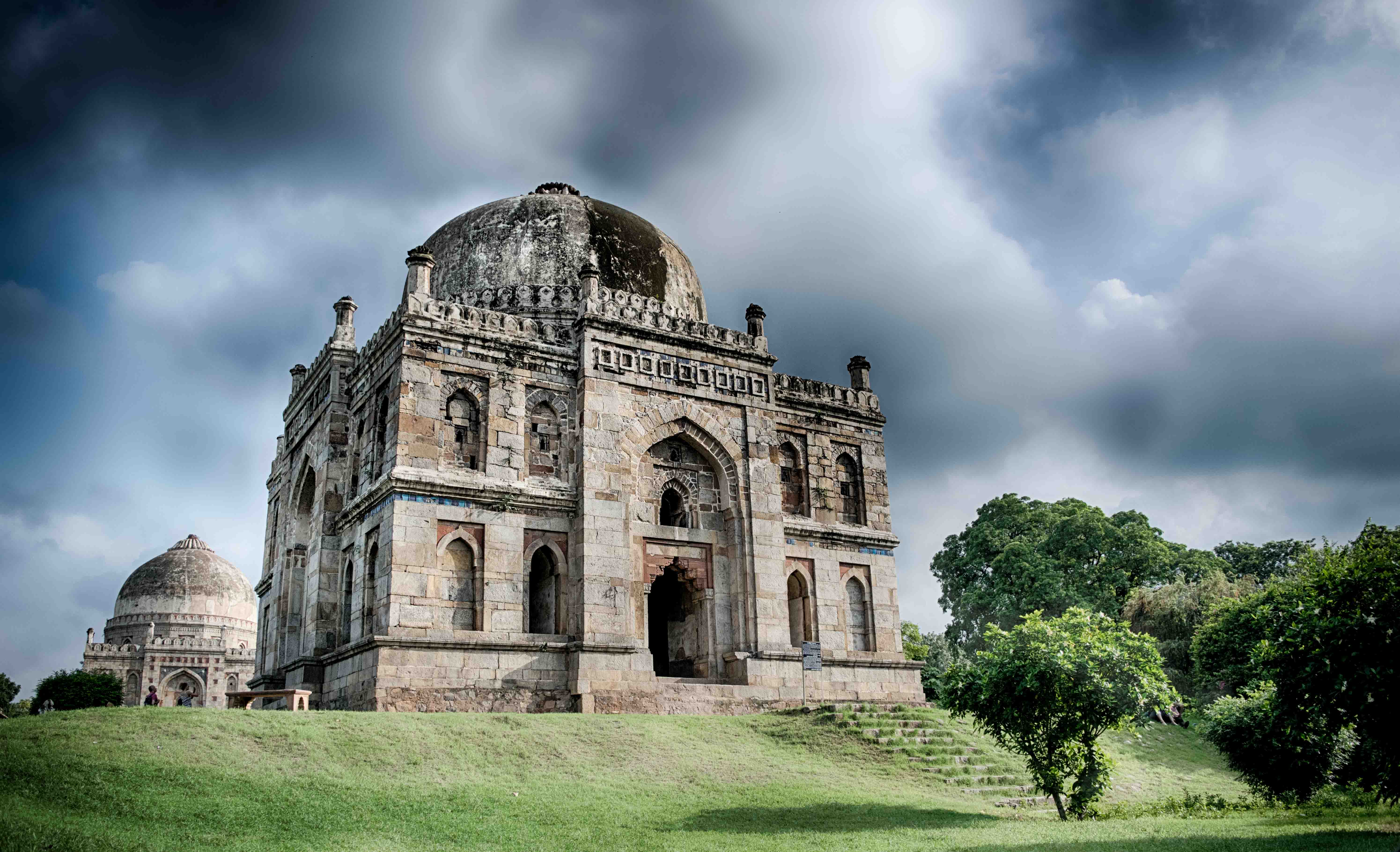
Shish Gumbad

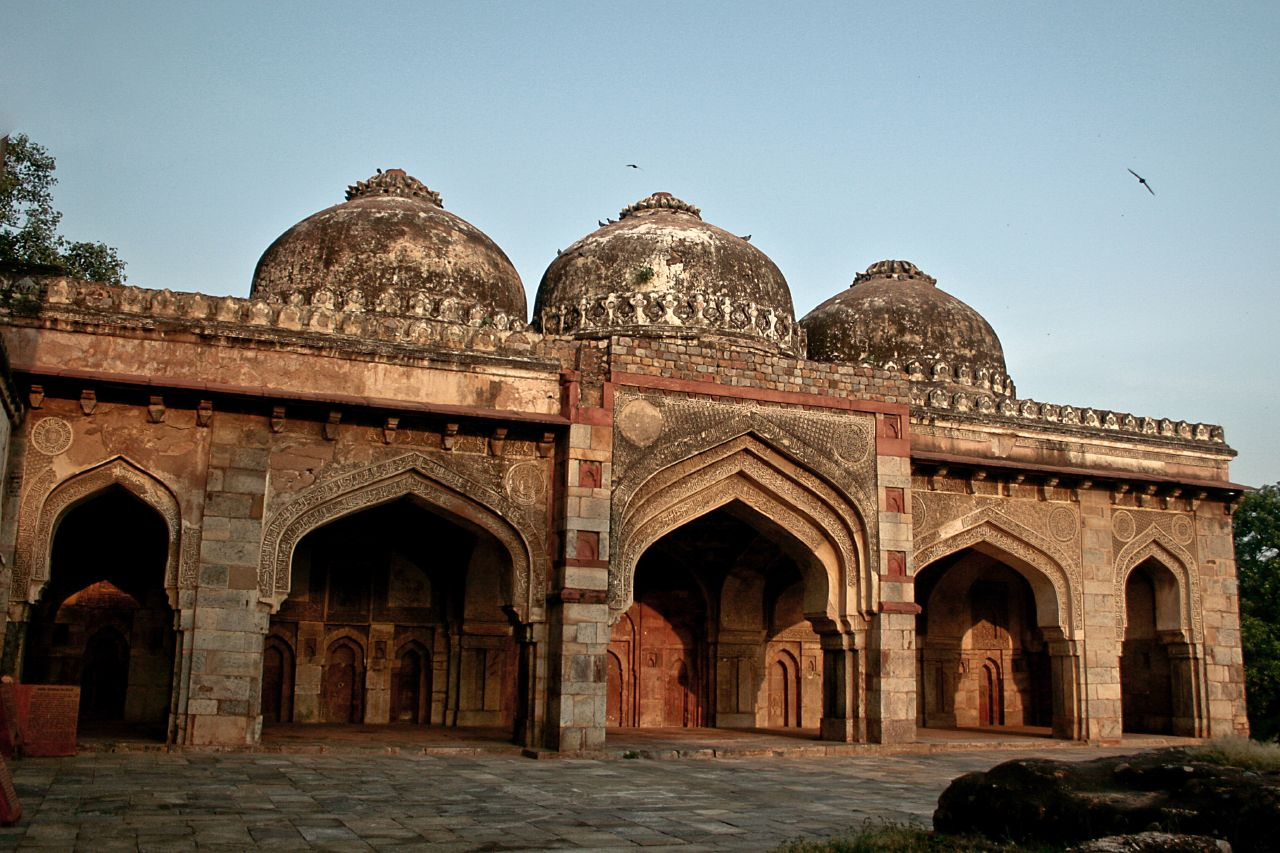
Three-domed mosque adjacent to Bara Gumbad

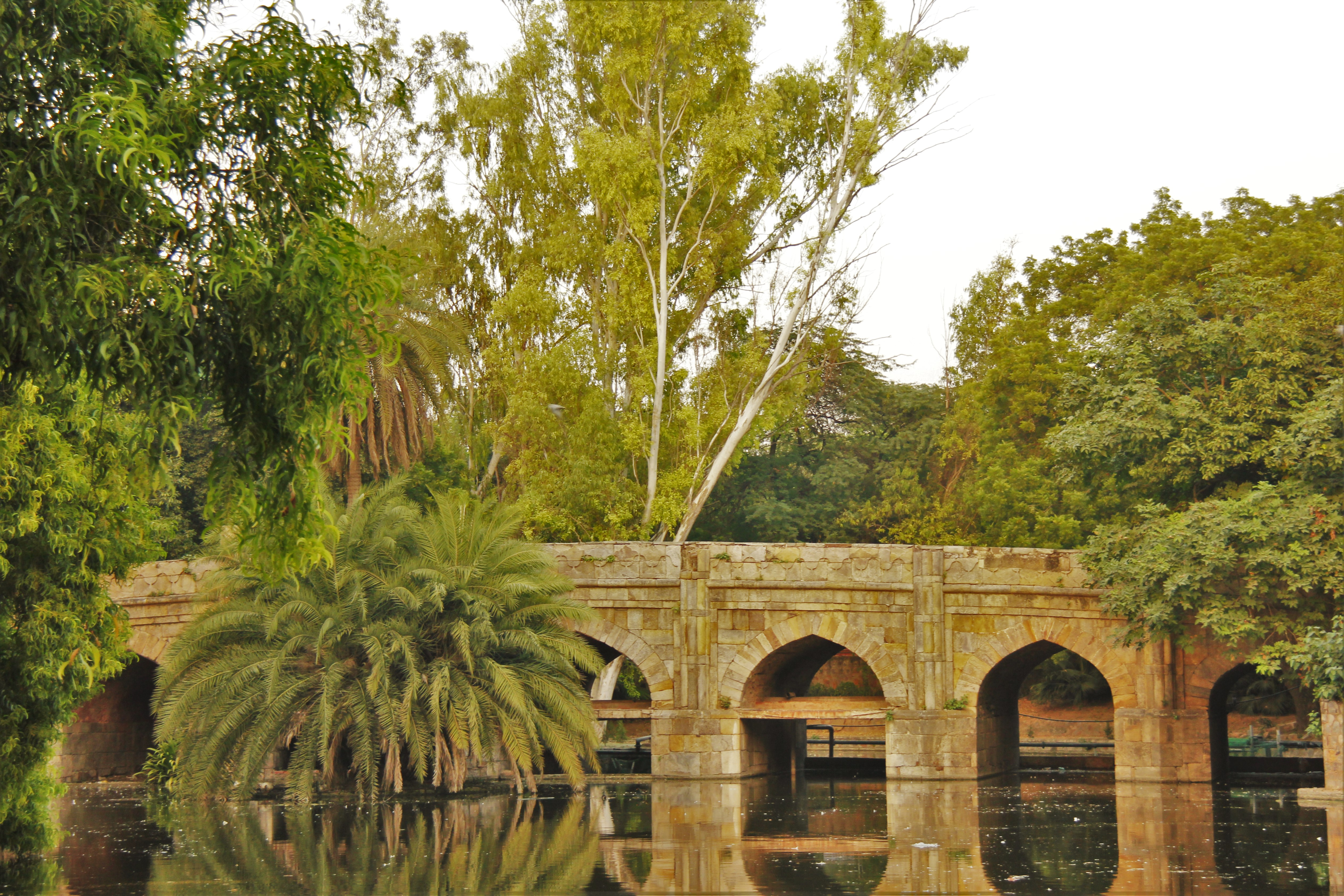
Eight-piered bridge

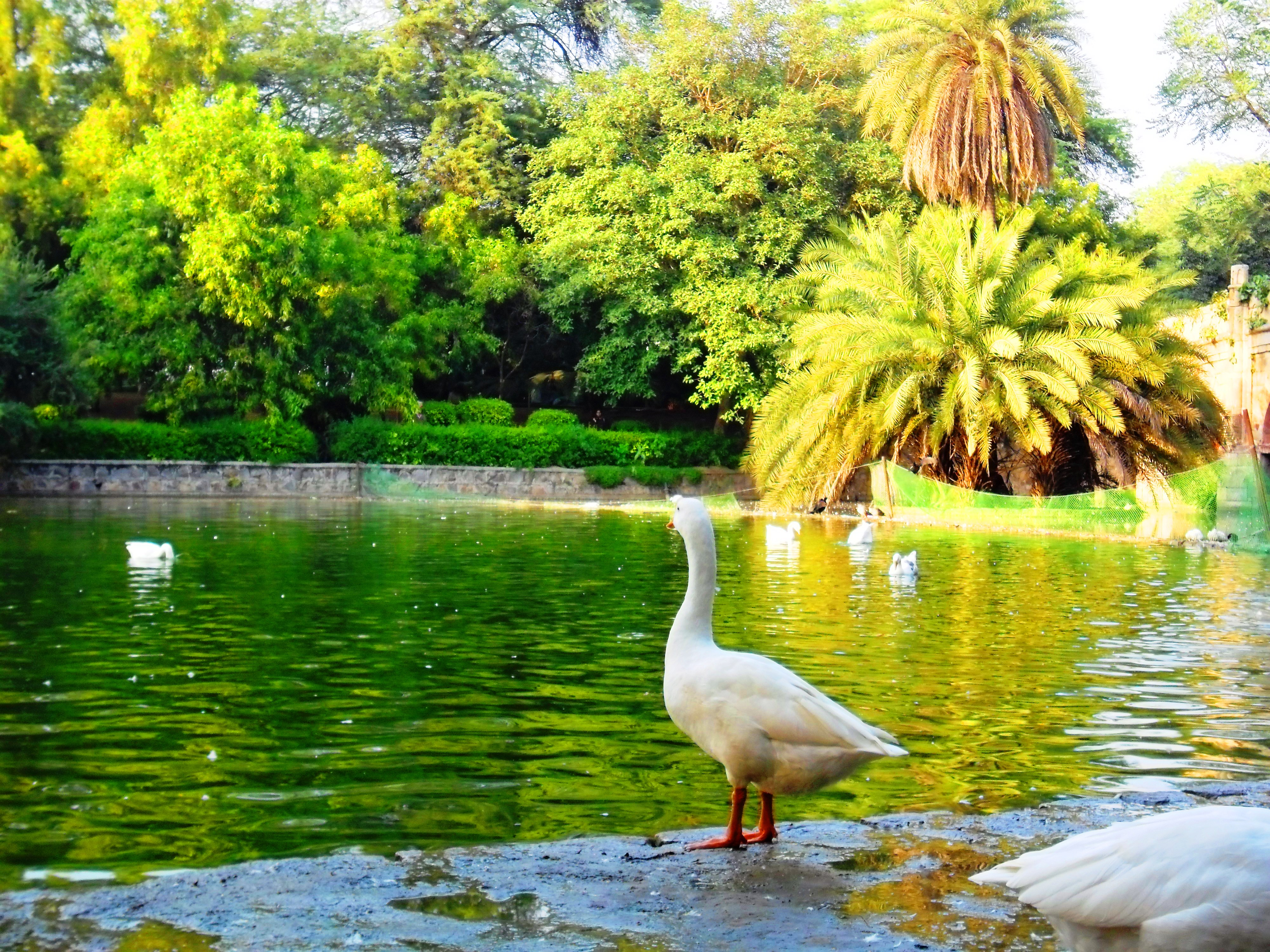
A goose stands beside the lake at Lodi Gardens

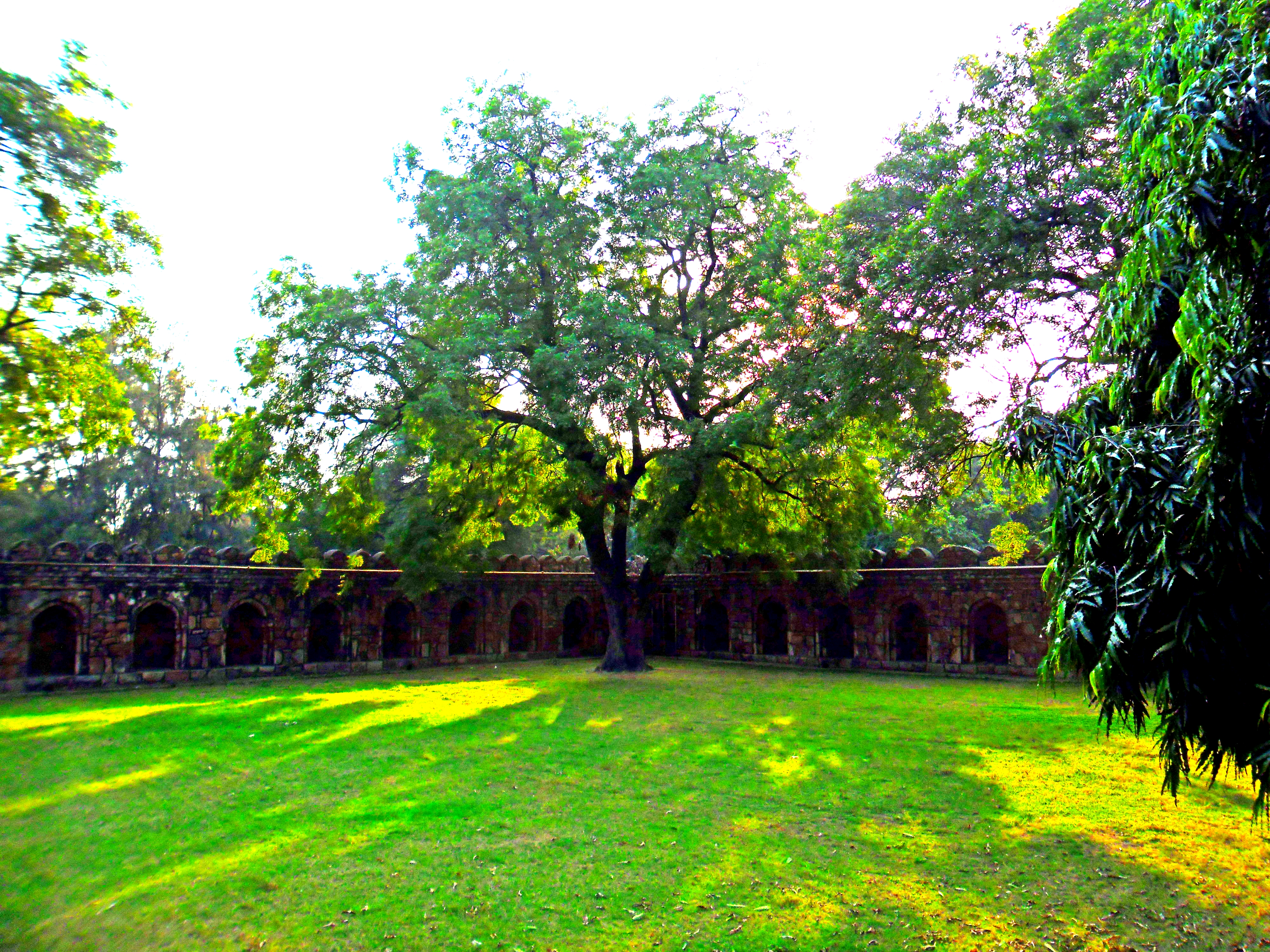
Walled enclosure of Sikander Lodi's tomb

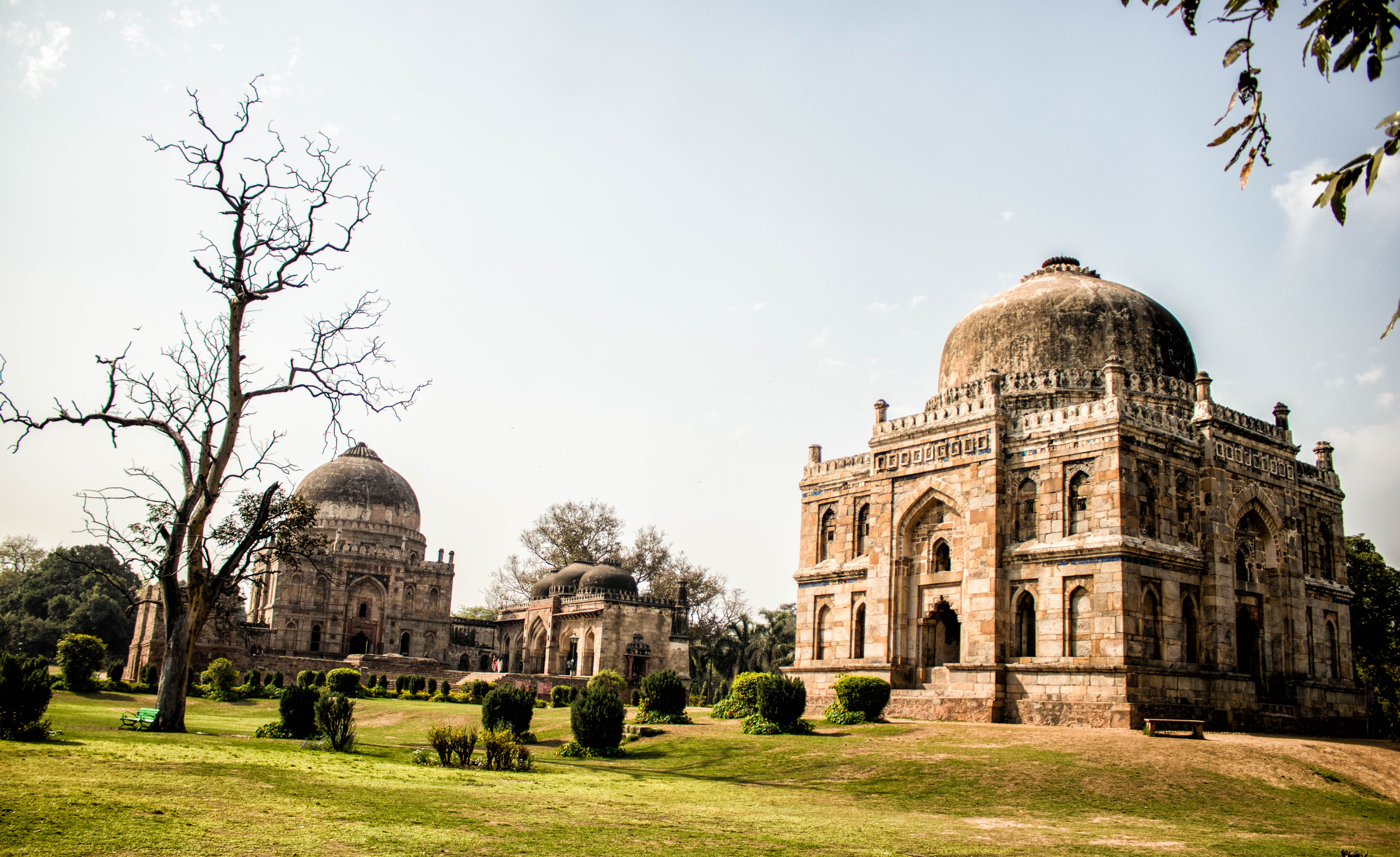
Shish Gumbad in front and Bara Gumbad with mosque at back

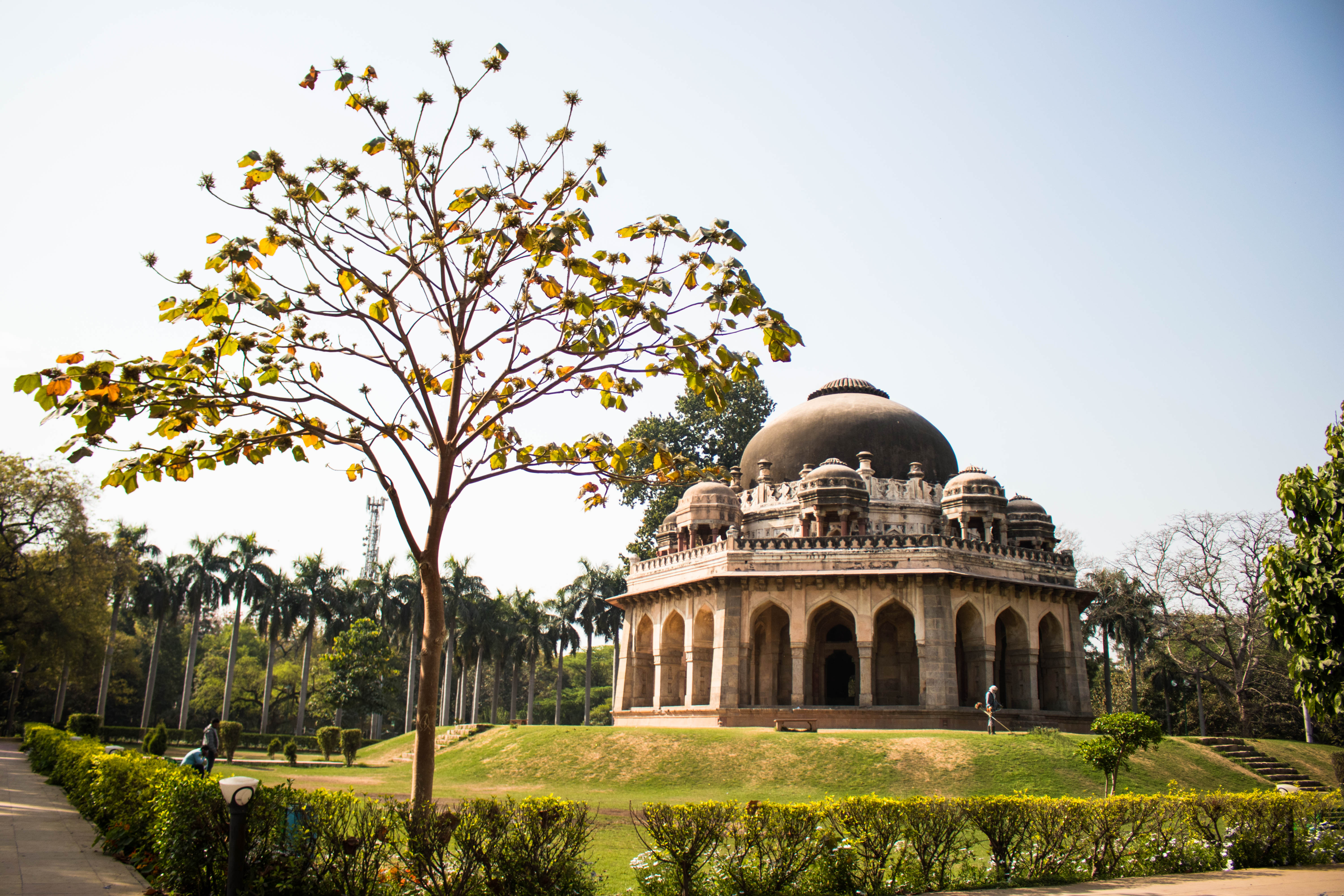
Tomb of Muhammad Shah, known as Mubarak Khan-Ka-Gumbaz

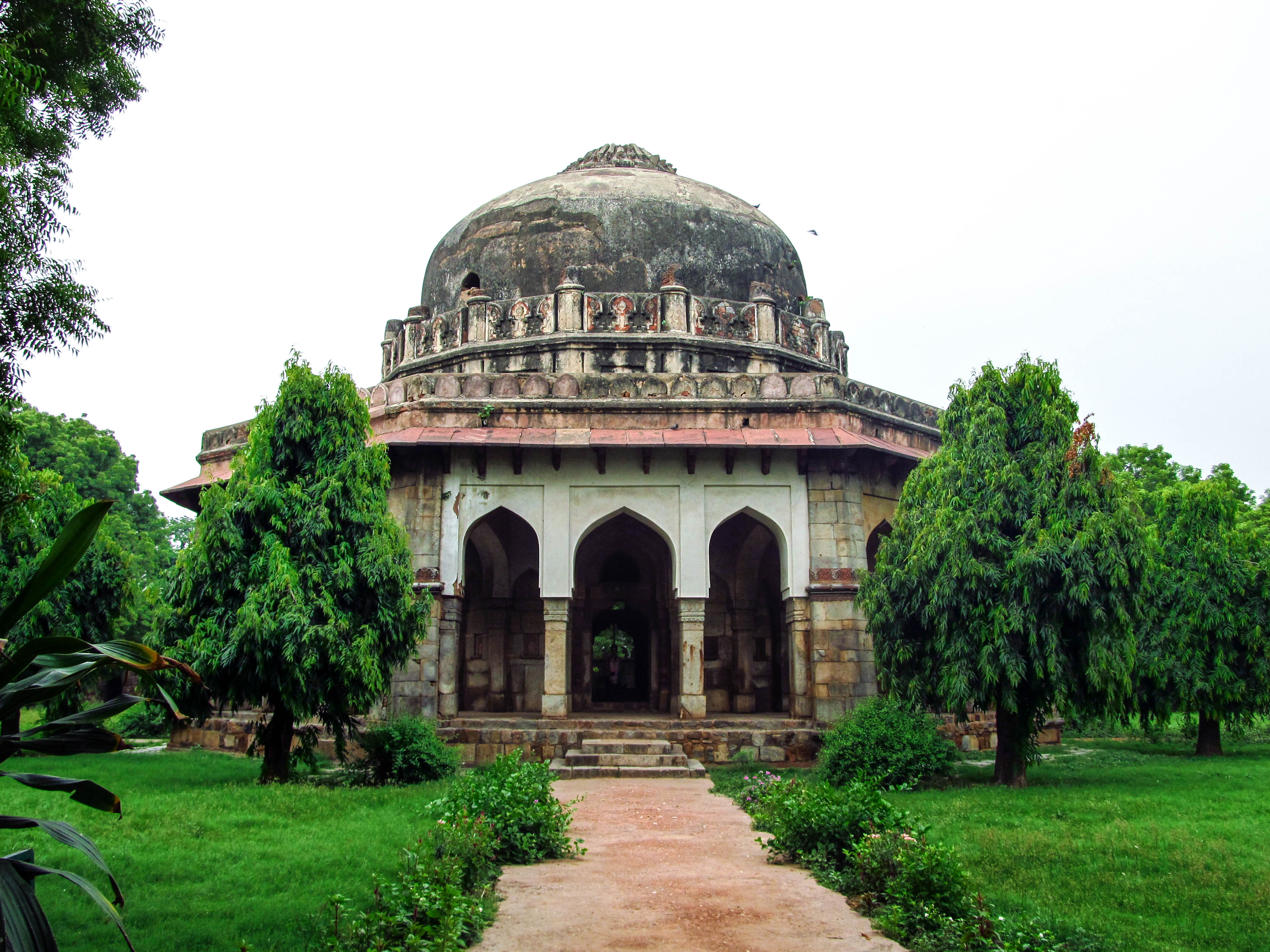
Tomb of Sikandar Lodi, built 1494

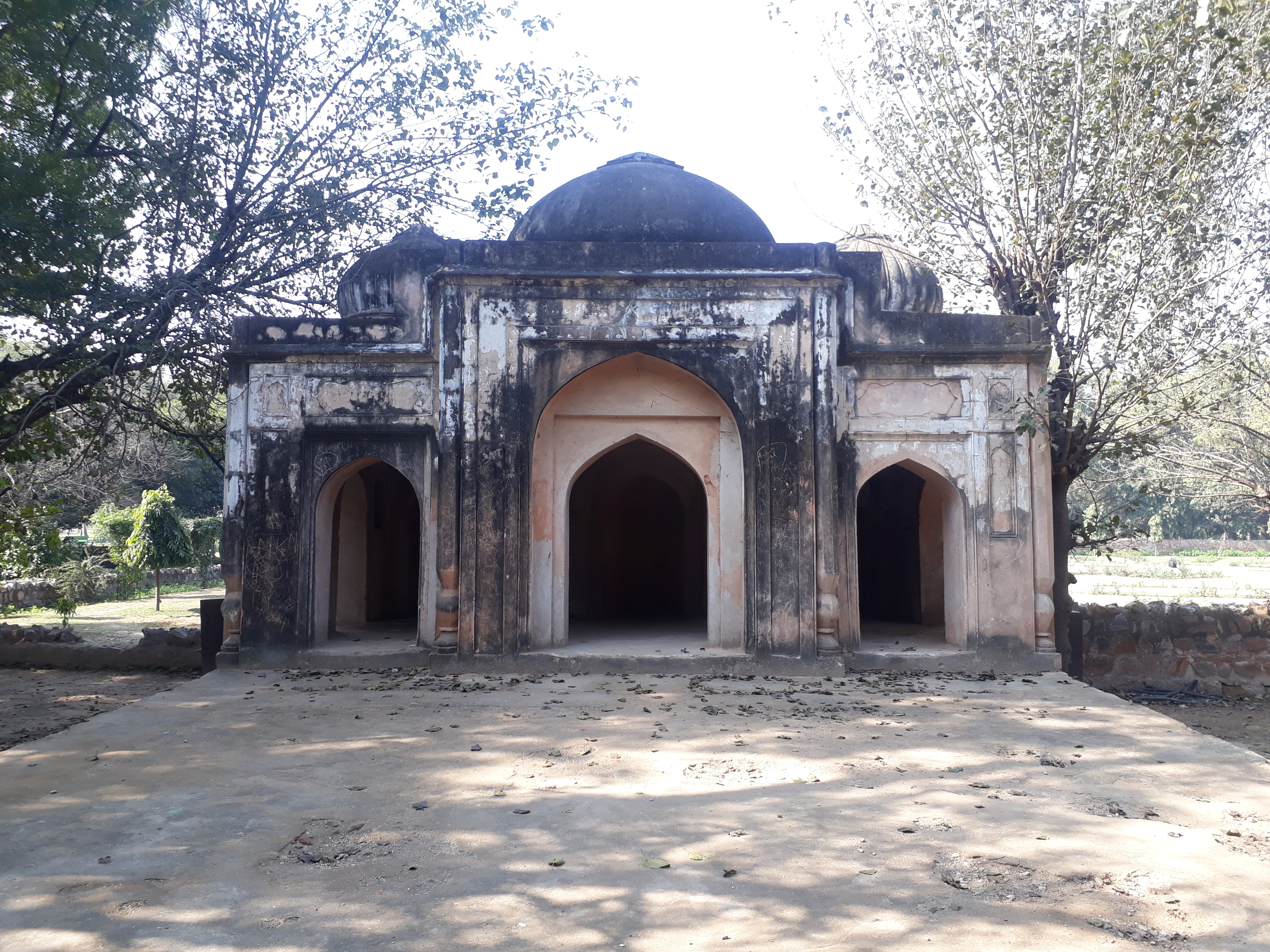
A mosque with the four walls of an enclosed garden behind

== See also ==
- The Lodhi
- Sunder Nursery
- List of Monuments of National Importance in Delhi
- List of parks in Delhi
- Tomb of Bahlul Lodi
- Tomb of Ibrahim Lodi
- Khwaja Khizr Tomb
