= Mardan Daulat =

Khwaja Dhia 'al-Din, whose complete title was Malik al-Sharq Mardan Daulat Nasir al-Mulk, and better known as Malik Mardan Daulat, was the governor of Multan under the Tughlaq dynasty, succeeding Ayn al-Mulk Mahru in 1362.

A descendant of Khwaja Abdullah Ansari of Herat, he arrived in Delhi Sultanate during the reign of Feroz Shah Tughlaq in 1353 and quickly rose to the governorship of important frontier region of Multan. He patronised saints and scholars such as Syed Jalaluddin Bukhari.

He was the adoptive father of Malik Sulaiman, whose son Khizr Khan later founded the Sayyid dynasty. Malik Mardan Daulat was known to recruit Afghans in his army; he had employed Bahram Khan Lodi, a horse merchant, at Multan. Bahram Khan was the grandfather of Bahlol Lodi, who went on to establish the fifth and last dynasty of Delhi Sultanate, the Lodi dynasty.

Malik Mardan was succeeded by his son Malik Shaikh as governor of Multan, who in turn was succeeded by Malik Sulaiman. Khizr Khan, the son of Malik Sulaiman, succeeded his father on the governorship of Multan and later founded own independent dynasty at Delhi.
