= Bahlul Khan Lodi =

Founder of the Lodi Dynasty (reigned 1451–1489)

- Bahlul Shah Ghazi
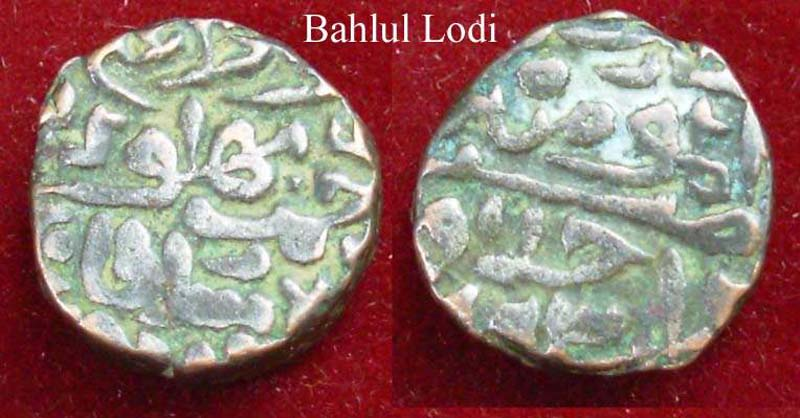
- Billon Tanka (80 ratti) of Bahlul Lodi

29th Sultan of Delhi Lodi Emperor
- Reign: 19 April 1451 – 12 July 1489
- Coronation: 19 April 1451
- Predecessor: Alam Shah
- Successor: Sikandar Lodi
- Born: c. 1421; Punjab
- Died: 12 July 1489 (aged 67–68); Delhi, Delhi Sultanate
- Burial: Tomb of Bahlul Lodi
- Spouse: Shams Khatun; Bibi Ambha
- Issue: Khawja Bayazid; Barbak Shah; Sikandar Shah; Mubarak Khan; Alam Khan; Taj Murassa; Jamal Khan; Yaqub Khan; Fath Khan; Musa Khan; Jalal Khan
Names
- Bahlul Shah Lodi
Regnal name
- Al-Mutawakkil Ala'l Rahman Bahlul Shah al-Sultan (Note: المتوکل على الرحمن بھلول شاہ السلطان, lit. 'The one who relies in the Most Gracious, Bahlul Shah, the Sultan')
- House: Shahu Khel
- Dynasty: Lodi
- Father: Kala Khan Lodi
- Religion: Sunni Islam

Bahlul Khan Lodi (Pashto: بہلول لودی; died 12 July 1489) was the chief of the Afghan Lodi tribe. He was the founder of the Lodi dynasty from the Delhi Sultanate, upon the abdication of the last claimant from the previous Sayyid dynasty. Bahlul became sultan of the dynasty on 19 April 1451 (855 AH).

== Early life ==
Bahlul's grandfather, Malik Bahram Khan Lodi, was a Lodi tribal chief from Dera Ismail Khan. He later took service under the governor of Multan, Malik Mardan Daulat. Bahram had five sons. His eldest son, Malik Sultan Shah Lodi, later served the Sayyid dynasty under Khizr Khan and distinguished himself by killing in the battle Khizr's worst enemy, Mallu Iqbal Khan. He was rewarded with the title of Islam Khan, and in 1419 appointed the governor of Sirhind. Bahlul, the son of Malik Kala Khan Lodi (the younger brother of Malik Sultan) was married to Malik Sultan's daughter.

In his youth, Bahlul was involved in the trading of horses and once sold his finely bred horses to the Sayyid Sultan Muhammad Shah. As a payment he was granted a pargana and raised to the status of amir. After the death of Malik Sultan, he became the governor of Sirhind. He was then allowed to add Lahore to his charge. Once, Sultan Muhammad Shah asked for his help when the Malwa Sultan Mahmud Khalji invaded his territory. Bahlul joined the imperial army with 20,000 mounted soldiers. By his cleverness, he was able to project himself as a victor over the army of the Malwa Sultan and Sultan Muhammad Shah conferred on him the title of Khan-i-Khanan. He also accepted Bahlul's occupation over a large part of Punjab.

In 1443, Bahlul attacked Delhi but he did not succeed. During the reign of last Sayyid ruler Sultan Alam Shah, Bahlul again made an unsuccessful attempt to capture Delhi in 1447. In 1448, when Alam Shah retired to Badaun, a minister of Alam Shah, Hamid Khan invited him to occupy the throne of Delhi. After the voluntary abdication of the throne by Alam Shah, Bahlul Shah ascended the throne of Delhi on 19 April 1451 and adopted the title of Bahlul Shah Ghazi. Alam Shah continued to live in Badaun until his death in July 1478.

== Reign ==
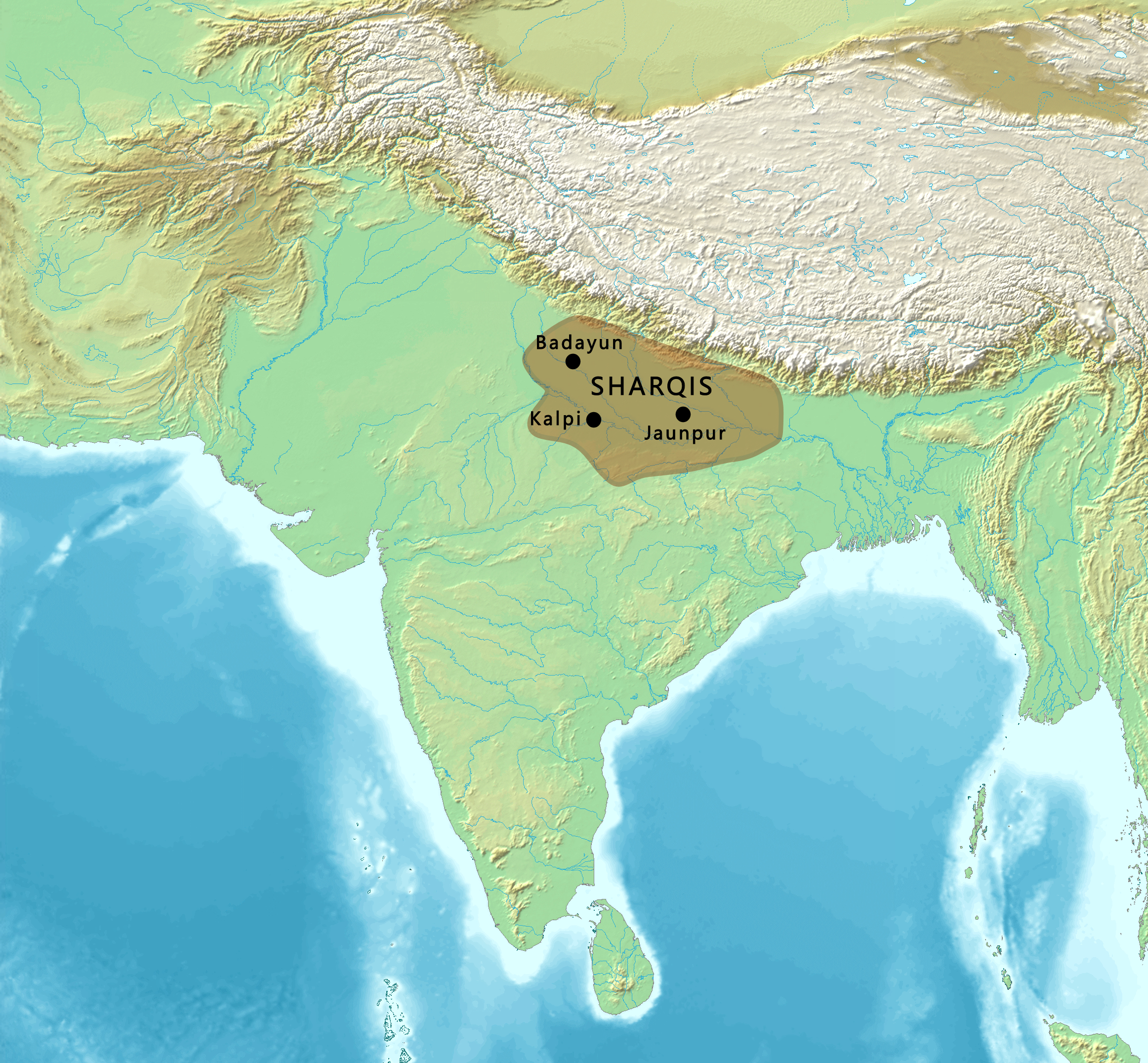
Bahlul Lodi conquered the Jaunpur Sultanate (Sharqi dynasty) in 1479.

After ascending to the throne, Bahlul decided to dispose of Hamid Khan. His cousin and brother-in-law Malik Mahmud Khan alias Qutb-ud-Din Khan (governor of Samana) imprisoned Hamid Khan.

In 1479, Sultan Bahlul Khan Lodi defeated and annexed the Jaunpur Sultanate based at Jaunpur. He fortified the city of Jaunpur and turned it into a kasbah with several mosques and madrasas.

Bahlul did much to stop rebellions and uprisings in his territories, and extended his holdings over Jaunpur and upper Uttar Pradesh. Just like the previous Delhi Sultans, he kept Delhi the capital of his kingdom.

In 1486, he appointed his son, Babrak Shah as viceroy of Jaunpur. In time, this proved to be problematic, as his second son, Nizam Khan (Sikandar Lodi) was named successor, and a power struggle ensued upon his death in July 1489.

The site of his grave is disputed. The Archeological Survey of India has long designated a building close to the shrine of the noted Sufi saint Nasiruddin Chirag-e-Delhi in a locality that goes by his name, 'Chirag Delhi', as Bahlul Lodi's tomb. Other historians argue that the Sheesh Gumbad in the Lodi Gardens is actually to be identified with his tomb.

== Marriages ==
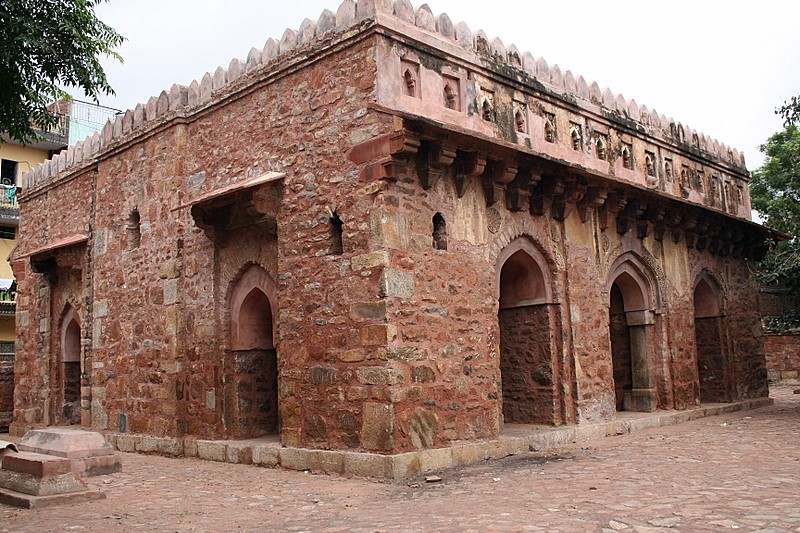
Tomb of Bahlol Lodi

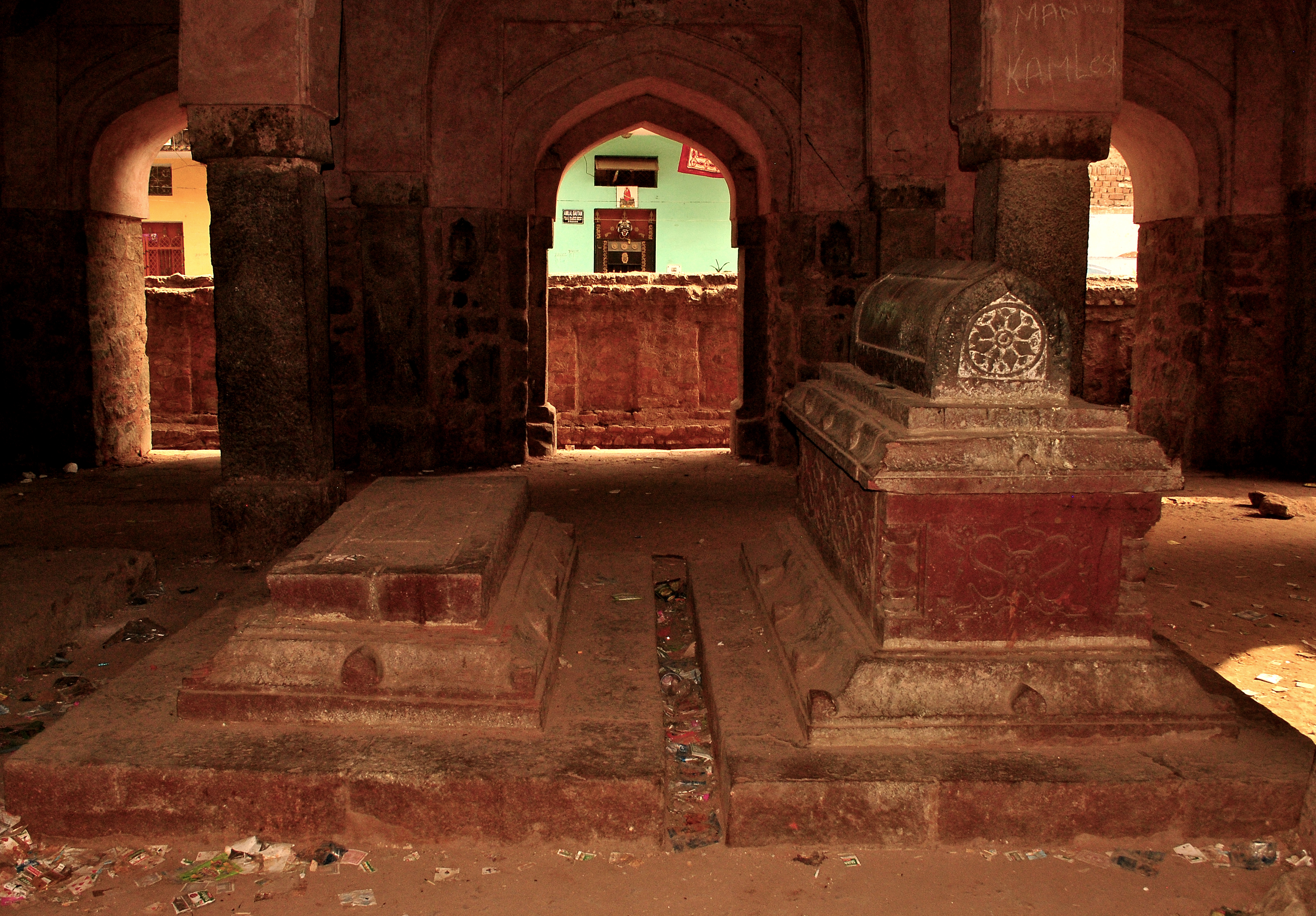
Graves inside Bahlol Lodi's tomb.

Bahlul married two times:

- Shams Khatun, daughter of Malik Sultan Shah Lodi, his first cousin; (Note: also identified by the name of Firdausi.)
- Bibi Ambha, daughter of a Hindu goldsmith (Note: original name, Ziba; romanized as Zībā.)

== See also ==
- Sher Shah Suri
- Shaikh Sama'al-Din Kamboh

Regnal titles
Preceded by Ala-ud-Din	Sultan of Delhi; 1451–1489	Succeeded by Sikandar Lodi
New dynasty	Lodi dynasty 1451–1525	Succeeded by Sikandar Lodi
