= Sikandar Khan Lodi =

Sultan of Delhi from 1489 to 1517

- Sūlṭān-ī-Dihlī; Sūlṭān-ī-Hindusṭān
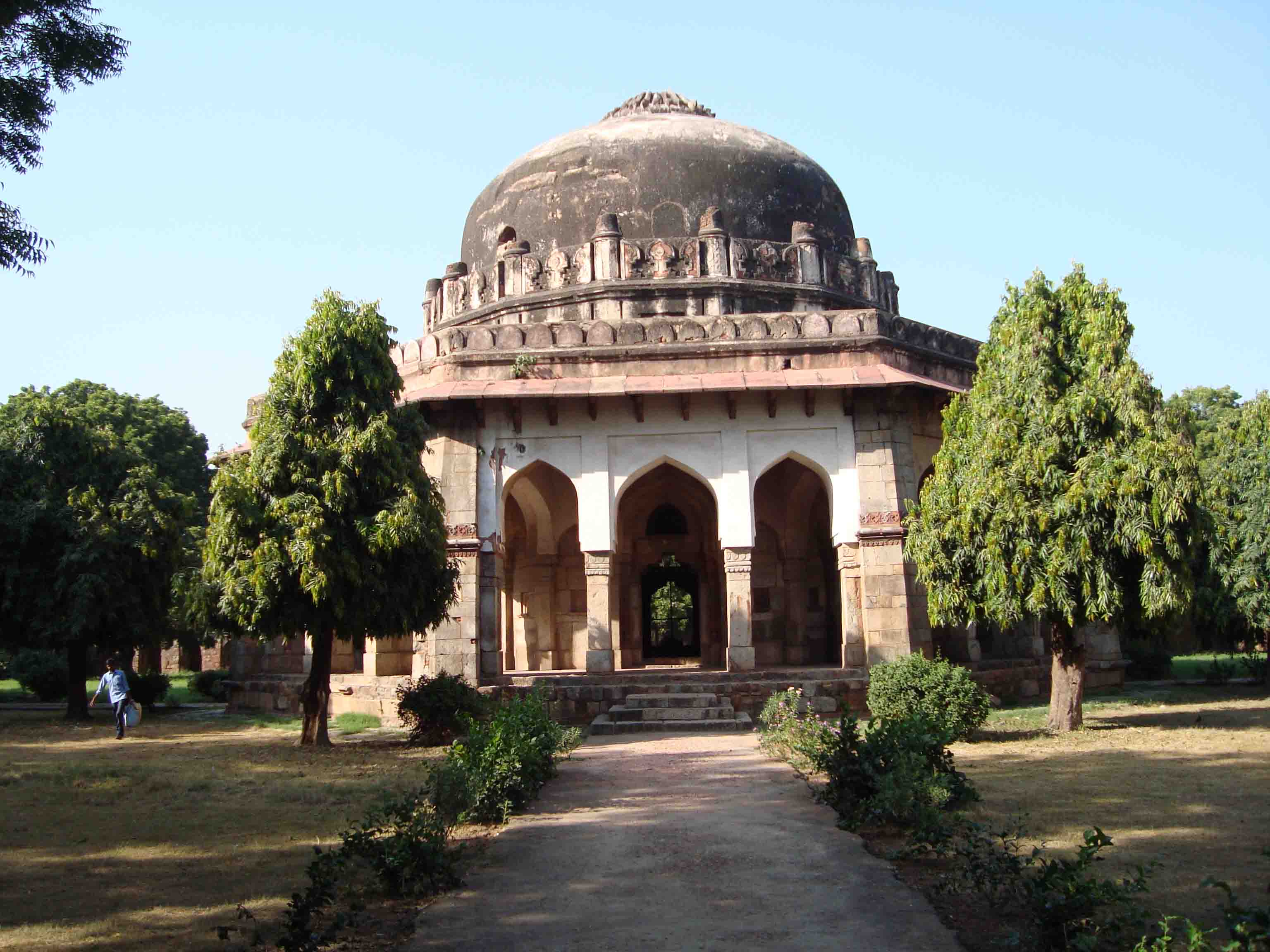
- The tomb of Sikandar Khan Lodi

30th Sultan of Delhi Lodi Emperor
- Reign: 17 July 1489 – 21 November 1517
- Coronation: 17 July 1489
- Predecessor: Bahlul Khan Lodi
- Successor: Ibrahim Khan Lodi
- Born: Nizam Khan; 17 July 1458; Delhi, Sultanate of Delhi
- Died: 21 November 1517 (aged 59); Agra, Delhi Sultanate
- Burial: Lodi Gardens, Delhi
- Issue: Ibrahim Lodi; Mahmud Khan Lodi; Ismail Khan Lodi; Hussain Khan Lodi; Jalal Khan Lodi; Daulat Khan Lodi; Burhan Lodi
Names
- Sikandar Shah Lodi
Regnal name
- Al-Mutawakkil Ala'l Rahman Sikandar Shah bin Bahlul Shah al-Sultan (Note: المتوکل على الرحمن سکندر شاہ بن بھلول شاہ السلطان, lit. 'The one who relies in the Most Gracious, Sikandar Shah son of Bahlul Shah, the Sultan')
- Dynasty: Lodi
- Father: Bahlul Lodi
- Mother: Bibi Ambha
- Religion: Sunni Islam

Sikandar Khan Lodi (Pashto: سکندر لودی; 17 July 1458 – 21 November 1517), born Nizam Khan (Pashto: نظام خان) also known as Sikandar II, was Sultan of the Delhi Sultanate between 1489 and 1517. An ethnic Afghan, he became ruler of the Lodi dynasty after the death of his father Bahlul Khan Lodi in July 1489. Being the second and most successful ruler of the Lodi dynasty of the Delhi Sultanate, he was also a poet of the Persian language and prepared a diwan of 9000 verses. He made an effort to recover the lost territories which once were a part of the Delhi Sultanate and was able to expand the territory controlled by the Lodi Dynasty.

== Biography ==
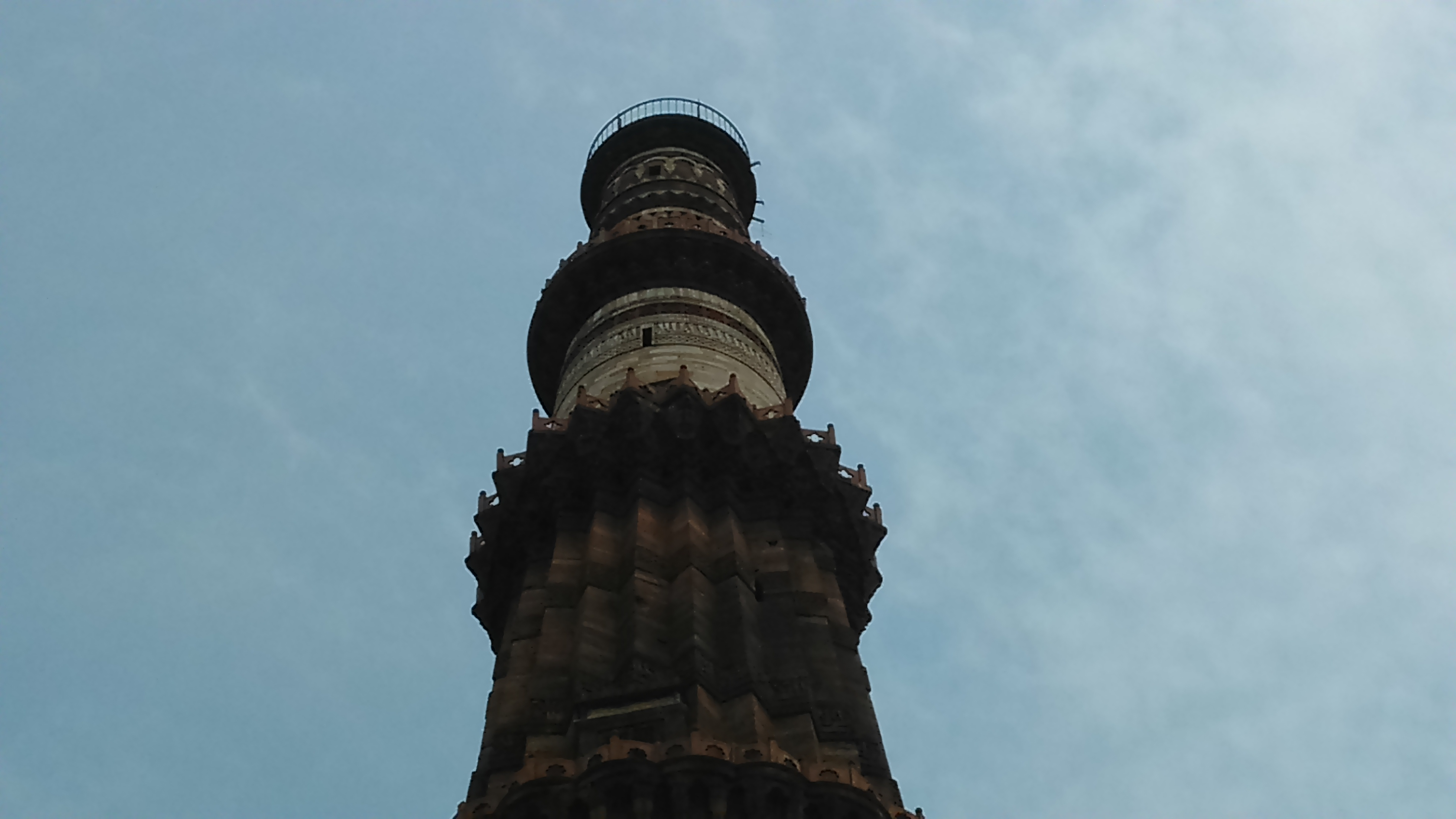
The top two storeys of the Qutub Minar were reconstructed in marble by Sikandar Lodi

Sikandar was born into the Afghan Lodi tribe, being the second son of Sultan Bahlul Lodi, who had founded the Lodi ruling dynasty of the Delhi Sultanate.

Sikandar was a capable ruler who encouraged trade across his territory. He expanded Lodi rule into the regions of Gwalior and Bihar. He made a treaty with Alauddin Hussain Shah and his Sultanate of Bengal. In 1503, he commissioned the building of the present-day city of Agra.

== Conflict with Gwalior ==
The newly crowned Raja Man Singh Tomar was not prepared for an invasion from Delhi, and decided to avoid a war by paying Bahlul Lodi a tribute of 800,000 tankas (coins). In 1489, Sikandar Lodi succeeded Bahlul Lodi as the Sultan of Delhi. In 1500, Manasimha provided asylum to some rebels from Delhi, who had been involved in a plot to overthrow Sikandar Lodi. The Sultan, wanting to punish Raja Man Singh Tomar, and to expand his territory, launched a punitive expedition against Gwalior. In 1501, he captured Dholpur, a dependency of Gwalior, whose ruler Vinayaka-deva fled to Gwalior.

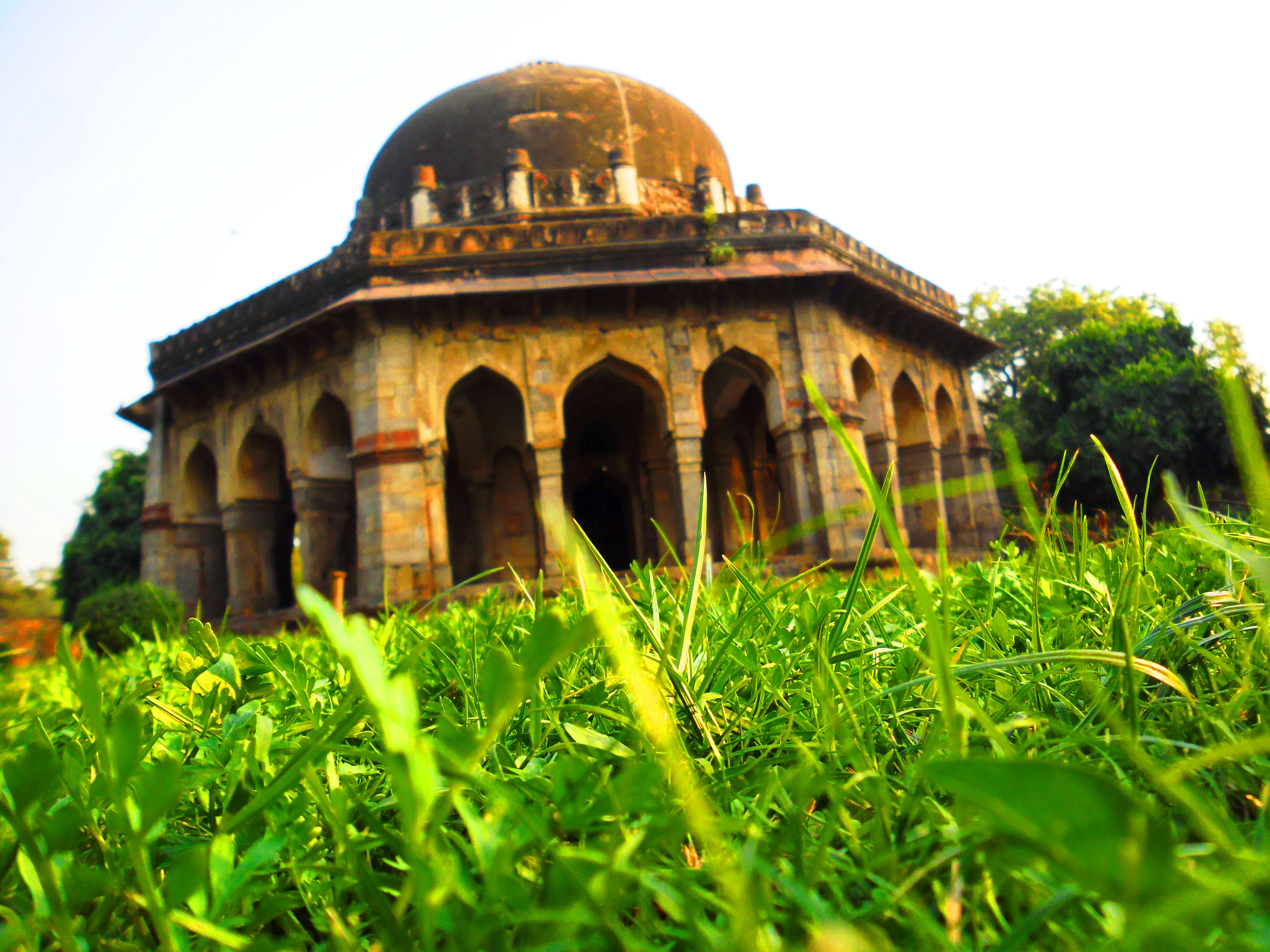
Sikandar Lodi's tomb

Sikandar Lodi then marched towards Gwalior, but after crossing the Chambal River, an epidemic outbreak in his camp forced him to halt his march. Raja Man Singh Tomar used this opportunity to reconcile with Lodi, and sent his son Kunwar Vikramaditya to the Lodi camp with gifts for the Sultan. He promised to expel the rebels from Delhi, on the condition that Dholpur be restored to Vinayaka-deva. Sikandar Lodi agreed to these terms, and left. Historian Kishori Saran Lal theorizes that Vinayaka Deva had not lost Dholpur at all: this narrative was created by the Delhi chroniclers to flatter the Sultan.

In 1504, Sikandar Lodi resumed his war against the Tomar Kings of Gwalior. First, he captured the Mandrayal fort, located to the east of Gwalior. He ransacked the area around Mandrayal, but many of his soldiers lost their lives in a subsequent epidemic outbreak, forcing him to return to Delhi. Sometime later, Lodi moved his base to the newly established city of Agra, which was located closer to Gwalior. He captured Dholpur, and then marched against Gwalior, characterizing the expedition as a jihad. From September 1505 to May 1506, Lodi managed to ransack the rural areas around Gwalior, but was unable to capture the Gwalior Fort because of Raja Man Singh Tomar's hit-and-run tactics. A scarcity of food resulting from Lodi's destruction of crops forced Lodi to give up the siege. During his return to Agra, Raja Man Singh Tomar ambushed his army near Jatwar, inflicting heavy casualties on the invaders. The Rajputs were defeated when support arrived from Lodi's main army, resulting in deaths of many Rajput soldiers.

Having failed to capture the Gwalior fort, Lodi decided to capture the smaller forts surrounding Gwalior. Dholpur and Mandrayal were already in his control by this time. In February 1507, he captured the Uditnagar (Utgir or Avantgarh) fort lying on the Narwar-Gwalior route. In September 1507, he marched against Narwar, whose ruler (a member of the Tomara clan) fluctuated his allegiance between the Tomaras of Gwalior and the Malwa Sultanate. He captured the fort after a year-long siege. In December 1508, Lodi placed Narwar in charge of Raj Singh Kachchwaha, and marched to Lahar (Lahayer) located to the south-east of Gwalior. He stayed at Lahar for a few months, during which he cleared its neighbourhood of rebels. Over the next few years, Lodi remained busy in other conflicts with various different sultanates. In 1516, he made a plan to capture Gwalior, but an illness prevented him from doing so. Raja Man Singh Tomar died in 1516, and Sikandar Lodi's illness also led to his death in November 1517.

== Patron and Poet ==
Sikander patronized learning and scholarship during his reign. His influence initiated a renaissance of poetry and music in Delhi, with the Hindu poet Dungar teaching at a Muslim college. He was not just a generous patron of writers, but also a talented scholar and poet who wrote Persian poetry under the pen name Gul Rukhi or Gulrukhi which means rose-faced.

The Lahdjat Sikandar Shahi wa-lata'if-i la-mutanahi, a rare musical composition, was put together as a result of Sikandar's patronage of musical training. This composition demonstrated Sikandar's deep interest in Indian music.

== Religion ==
Because Sikandar's mother was a Hindu, he tried to prove his Islamic credentials by resorting to strong Sunni orthodoxy as a political expediency. He destroyed Hindu temples, and under the pressure from the ulama, allowed the execution of a Brahmin who declared Hinduism to be as veracious as Islam. He also banned women from visiting the mazars (mausoleums) of Muslim saints, and banned the annual procession of the spear of the legendary Muslim martyr Ghazi Salar Masud.

Before Sikandar's time, the judicial duties in smaller villages and towns were performed by local administrators, while the Sultan himself consulted the scholars of the Islamic law (sharia). Sikandar established sharia courts in several towns, enabling the qazis to administer the sharia law to a larger population. Although such courts were established in areas with significant Muslim population, they were also open to the non-Muslim population, including for non-religious matters such as property disputes.

== Notes ==
Preceded by Bahlul Lodi	Sultan of Delhi; 1489–1517	Succeeded by Ibrahim Lodi
