= Muhammad Shah IV =

Sultan of Delhi from 1434 to 1445

Sultan of Delhi
- Reign: 19 February 1434 – 1 January 1445
- Predecessor: Mubarak Shah
- Successor: Alam Shah
- Under the nominal suzerainty: Shah Rukh
- Born: 1397; Delhi
- Died: 1 January 1445 (aged 47–48)
- Issue: Alam Shah
- Dynasty: Sayyid
- Religion: Islam

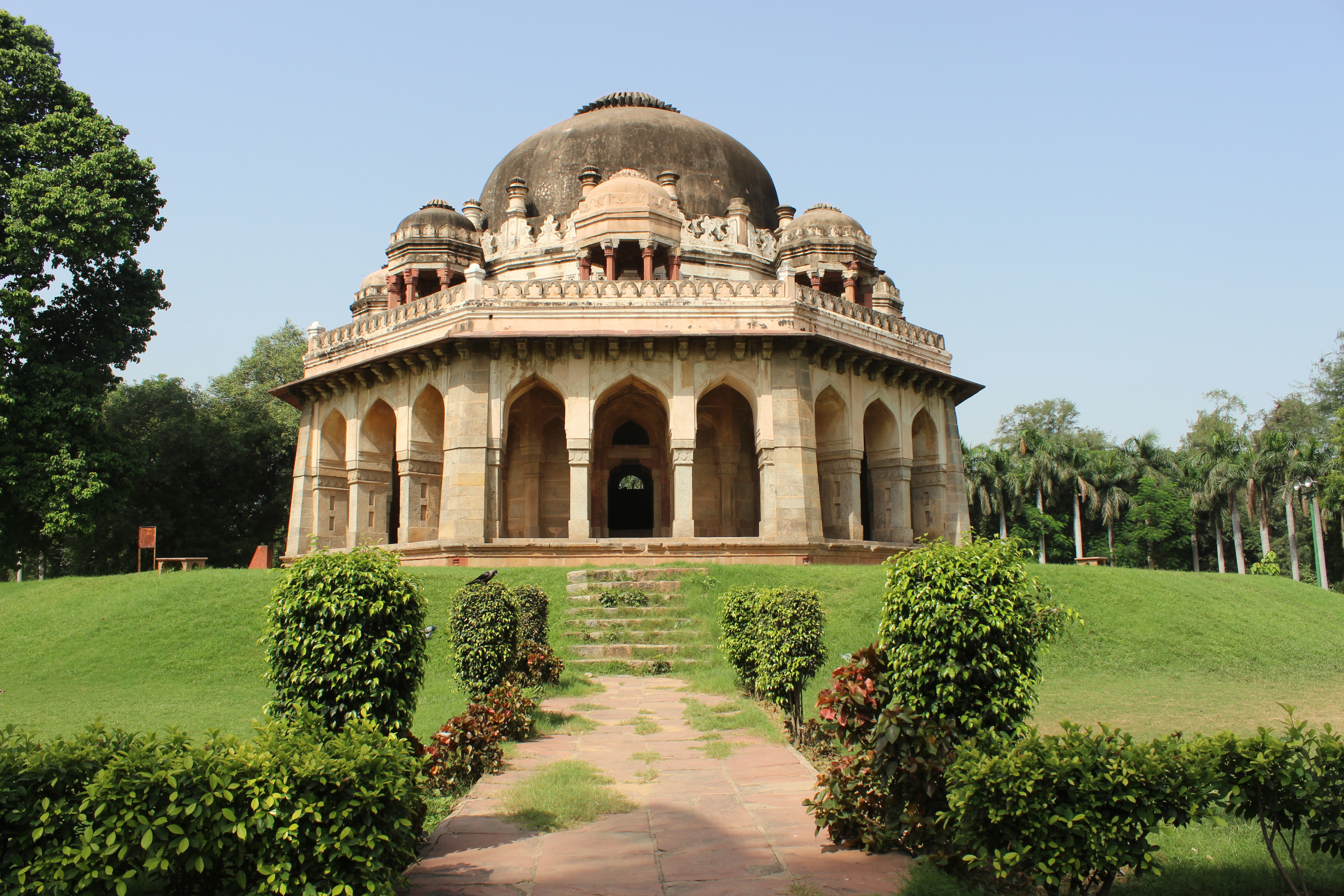
Tomb of Muhammad Shah

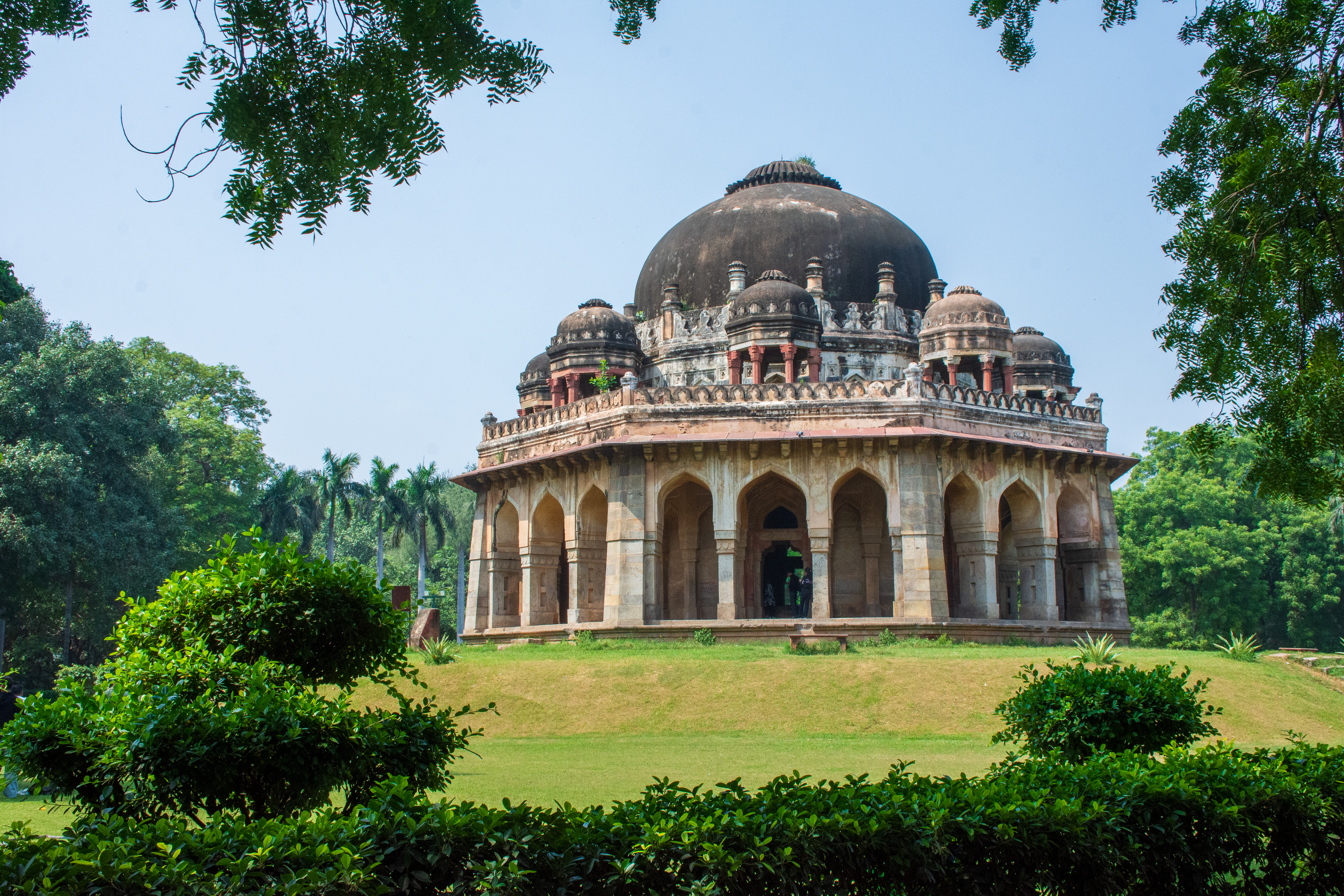
Muhammad Shah's Tomb, Lodi Gardens, New Delhi. 15th century Sayyid dynasty. This tomb later inspired the nearby Tomb of Tomb of Sikandar Lodi.

Muhammad Shah IV (Persian: محمد شاه; 1397 – 1 January 1445) was the third monarch of the Sayyid dynasty which ruled the Delhi Sultanate.

== Life ==
After Mubarak Shah’s death, his nephew Muhammad Khan bin Farid Khan ascended the throne as Sultan Muhammad Shah. For the first six months of his reign, however, true power lay in the hands of Sarvar-ul-Mulk, also called Khan-i-Jahan. He set about purging the old nobility, but the displaced nobles rallied under a leader named Kamal-ul-Mulk.

The first spark of rebellion lit up in Bayana, where its ruler, Yusuf Khan Auhadi, resisted Sarvar-ul-Mulk’s attempt to seize the local fort and killed the officer sent to take it. Other regional chiefs soon joined the uprising. Under cover of feigned loyalty, Kamal-ul-Mulk won Sarvar-ul-Mulk’s confidence and was given command of the royal army to crush the rebels. Rather than marching straight to Bayana, he halted at Ahar. When the rebel leaders learned of his true intentions in May 1434, they sided with him and together they advanced on Delhi to avenge the late sultan’s death.

Deprived of the army’s support, Sarvar-ul-Mulk tried to assassinate the new king, but Muhammad Shah’s bodyguards intervened and slew him and his conspirators. After a three-month siege, the rebel forces entered Delhi, and the nobles renewed their allegiance to Muhammad Shah. Kamal-ul-Mulk was then appointed as the chief minister.

Despite this opportunity to stabilize the realm, Kamal-ul-Mulk soon disappointed everyone by neglecting his duties in favor of a life of leisure. Disorder spread throughout the kingdom, and even prominent Delhi figures joined Jalal Khan of Mewat in inviting Sultan Mahmud Khalji of Malwa to intervene. The Malwa army encamped near Delhi at Talpat. Unable to defend his capital alone, Muhammad Shah summoned Bahlul Lodi of Sirhind, who arrived with twenty thousand horsemen. The two armies clashed, but as neither side prevailed on the first day, Muhammad Shah secretly sued for peace the following morning. Alarmed by an ominous vision, the Khalji ruler accepted and withdrew to Mandu.

Bahlul Lodi, frustrated by the king’s caution, seized the initiative by ambushing the Khalji rear guard that same night, seizing supplies and cutting down their soldiers. Sultan Mahmud Khalji, impressed, embraced Bahlul as a son and bestowed upon him the title Khan-i-Khanan. In gratitude, Muhammad Shah granted Bahlul authority over much of the Punjab and charged him with subduing the Khokhar rebel Jasrath, who ultimately negotiated his own settlement.

By the early 1440s, the Lodis had grown powerful enough to attempt an assault on Delhi, though Bahlul’s 1443 attack failed. In the last years of Muhammad Shah’s rule, his grip on the sultanate unraveled. Multan under the Langah dynasty declared its independence, the Sharqi dynasty seized eastern territories, numerous local chiefs ceased paying tribute, and even lords close to Delhi asserted their autonomy. Shortly before his death in 1445, Muhammad Shah summoned his son Alam Shah from the provinces and officially named him his heir.
