= Ayn al-Mulk Mahru =

Delhi Sultanate official (died 1362)

Governor of Awadh
- In office c. 1338–1341
- Monarch: Muhammad bin Tughlaq

Governor of Multan and Siwistan
- In office 1350 – 1351; 1352 – 1362
- Monarch: Firuz Shah Tughlaq
- Preceded by: Imad-ul-Mulk Sartez
- Succeeded by: Malik Mardan Daulat

Personal details
- Died: 1362 Multan, Delhi Sultanate

‘Ayn al-Din Abdullah bin Mahru (died 1362), better known by his title ‘Ayn al-Mulk, was an official of the Delhi Sultanate serving during the reign of Muhammad bin Tughluq and Firuz Shah Tughlaq. He is perhaps best known for the collection of his letters known as Insha-i-Mähru.

Ayn al-Mulk was an Indian Muslim. His father Mahru was a convert to Islam; Ayn al-Mulk himself was probably born in Multan, Punjab. He first gained prominence under Muhammad ibn Tughlaq (1325–1351) who appointed him to the governorship (Iqta') of Awadh, where he put down a rebellion at Kara in 1338. According to Ibn Battuta, the Khurasanis and the Amirs of foreign extraction feared him greatly since he was a Hindi (Indian) and able Hindis were displeased with the foreigners.

Ayn al-Mulk brought stability in Awadh with remarkable ability, and soon a number of nobles discontented with Sultan fled to him from Delhi, attracted by Awadh's prosperity and Ayn al-Mulk's mild government. This displeased the Sultan who decided to transfer him to Deccan, as well as demanded to hand over the rebel nobles. Ayn al-Mulk considered this an attempt to dispose him from power and rebelled in 1341. Hearing the news Sultan hurriedly went with his army to Qannauj where he defeated and captured Ayn al-Mulk when one of Ayn al-Mulk's amirs betrayed him. He was brought to Delhi and was subjected to humiliation for two and half a year, before being pardoned and appointed the superintendent of the royal gardens.

In 1350 Ayn al-Mulk was appointed to Multan. He was recalled to Delhi by Firuz Shah (1351–1388) after the death of Muhammad bin Tughlaq and given the post of Mushrif, who was in charge of collecting taxes. Soon however he came in conflict with the vizier Khan-i-Jahan and the relations between the two deteriorated to such an extent that Firuz Shah dismissed Ayn al-Mulk and sent him to govern the provinces of Multan, Siwistan and Bhakkar in 1352. As Ayn al-Mulk refused to work under Khan-i-Jahan, the provinces handed to him were made directly accountable to sultan. He remained there until his death in about 1362.

Ayn al-Mulk's life and events have been frequently confused by both medieval and modern writers with that of Ayn al-Mulk Multani; modern research holds both to be different individuals belonging to the different generations. Ayn al-Mulk has left a collection of his 133 private letters and official documents compiled sometimes before 1360, which are a valuable source for the cultural history and administrative structure of the Delhi Sultanate during the Tughlaq period.
