= Sayyid dynasty =

Rulers of the Delhi Sultanate

Sayyid
- 1414–1451
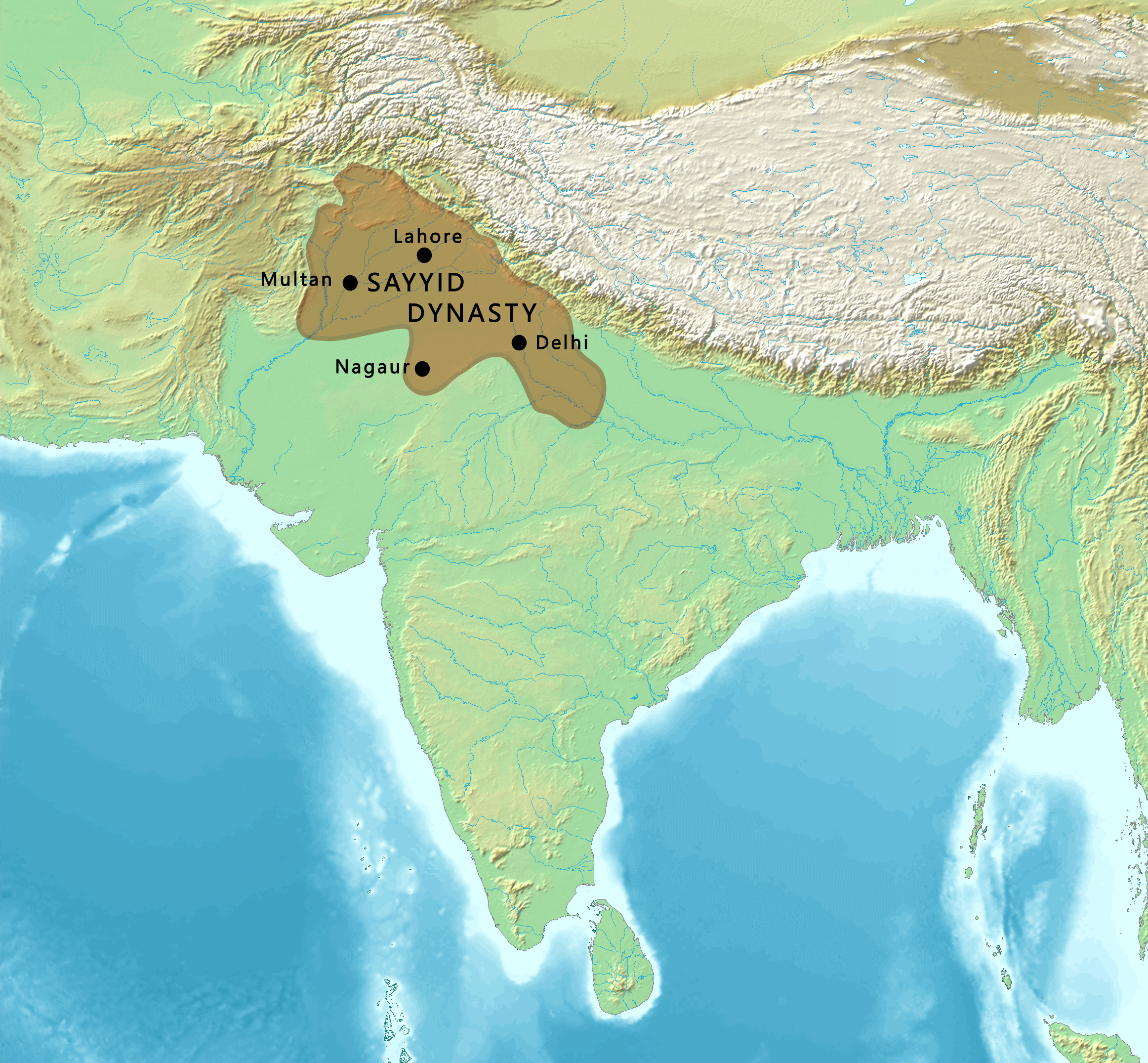
- Sayyid dynasty (South Asia) Territories of the Sayyid dynasty, and main contemporary South Asian polities.
- Capital: Delhi
- Common languages: Persian (official)
- Religion: Sunni Islam
- Government: Monarchy
- Sultan
  - 1414–1421: Khizr Khan (first)
  - 1421–1434: Mubarak Shah (second)
  - 1434–1443: Muhammad Shah (third)
  - 1443–1451: Ala-ud-Din Alam Shah (fourth and last)
- History
  - Established: 28 May 1414
  - Disestablished: 20 April 1451
Preceded by	Succeeded by
Tughlaq dynasty	Lodi dynasty; Langah Sultanate
- Today part of: India; Pakistan

The Sayyid dynasty was the fourth dynasty of the Delhi Sultanate, with four rulers ruling from 1414 to 1451 for 37 years. The first ruler of the dynasty, Khizr Khan, initially a vassal of Timurid Empire at Multan, conquered Delhi in 1414. His successor Mubarak Shah proclaimed himself sultan in 1421. The dynasty succeeded the Tughlaq dynasty and ruled the sultanate until they were displaced by the Lodi dynasty in 1451.

== Background ==
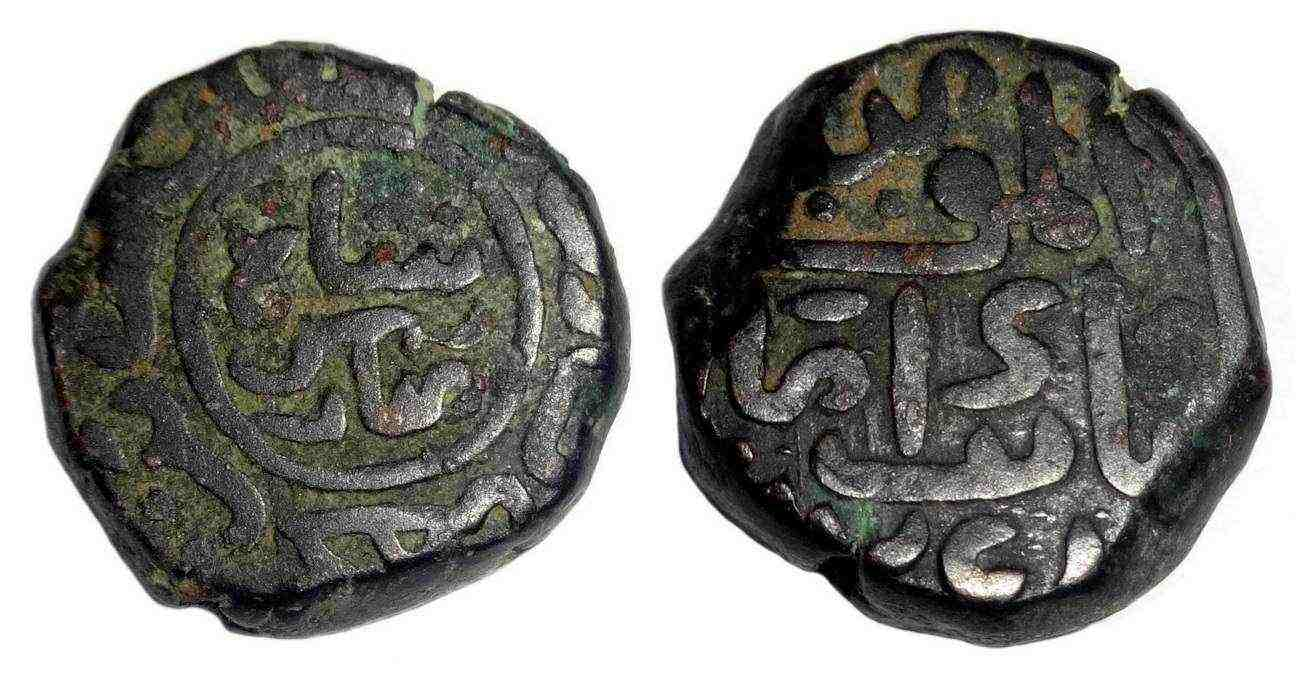
Double falls of Mubarak Shah.

Khizr Khan was the founder of the dynasty. His father, Malik Sulaiman, was an adopted son of Malik Mardan Daulat, who succeeded Ayn al-Mulk Mahru as the governor of Multan under Tughlaq dynasty. The epithet 'sayyid' affixed to the name of dynasty came from their claimed descent from Muhammad. According to the Tarikh-i-Mubarak Shahi of a contemporary writer Yahya Sirhindi, the Syed identity of Malik Sulaiman was established by the Sufi saint Syed Jalaluddin Bukhari during one of his visits to Mardan Daulat, whose patronage the saint enjoyed. Modern historians doubt the claimed Syed ancestry of the dynasty, although several scholars suggest Khizr Khan to have descended from an Arab family long settled at Multan. Some scholars suggest Khizr Khan to be a Punjabi chieftain from the Khokhar clan, who rose to power through his contacts in the Timurid Empire.

== History ==
=== Khizr Khan ===
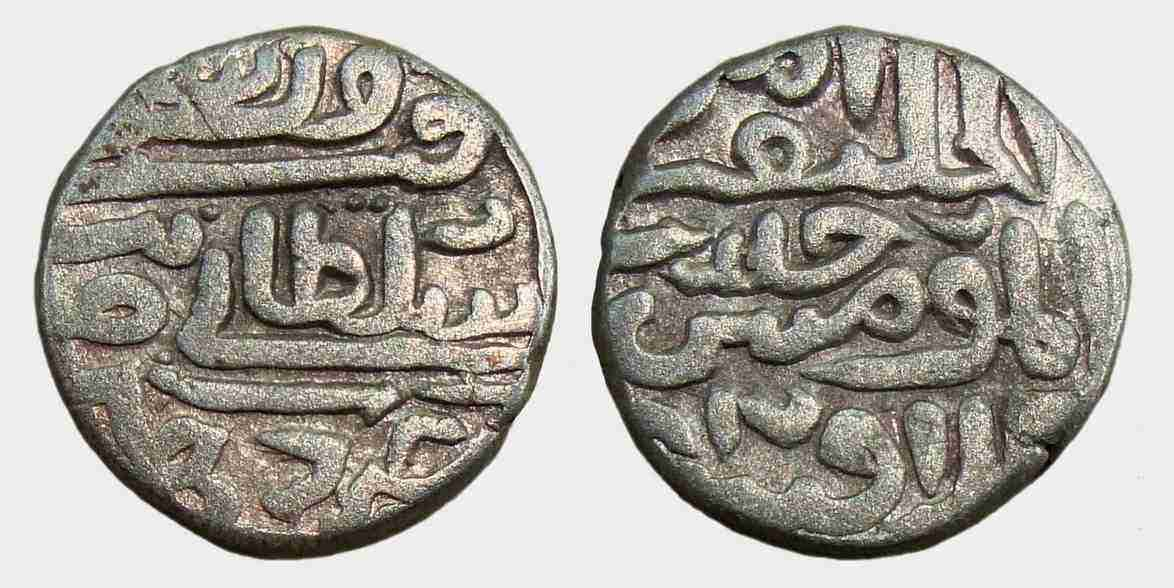
Billon Tanka of Khizr Khan in the name of Firoz Shah Tughlaq.

Khizr Khan was initially a noble in the Delhi Sultanate during the Tughlaq dynasty, and was the governor of Multan under Sultan Firuz Shah. This period was characterised by civil war among the nobles of the sultanate. Khizr Khan was expelled from the city by Sarang Khan, the governor of Dipalpur, who had also recovered Lahore from Shaikha Khokhar. Sarang Khan was a brother of Mallu Iqbal Khan, a former slave and the de-facto ruler at Delhi. Sarang Khan was aided by the servants of Malik Mardan Bhatti in his capture of Multan.

Following the sack of Delhi by Timur in 1398, he appointed Khizr Khan as deputy of Multan in Punjab, with charges of Lahore, Dipalpur, Multan and upper Sindh. Collecting his forces, Khizr Khan defeated and killed Mallu Iqbal Khan in 1405. He then captured Delhi on 28 May 1414, thereby establishing the Sayyid dynasty. Khizr Khan did not take up the title of sultan, but continued the fiction of his allegiance to Timurids as Rayat-i-Ala (vassal), initially that of Timur, and later his son Shah Rukh. As a mark of recognition of the suzerainty of the Timurids, the name of the Timurid ruler (Shah Rukh) was recited in the khutba. Still, as an interesting innovation, the name of Khizr Khan was also attached to it. But strangely enough, the name of the Timurid ruler was not inscribed on the coins, and the name of the old Tughlaq sultan continued on the currency. No coins are known in the name of Khizr Khan.

=== Mubarak Shah ===
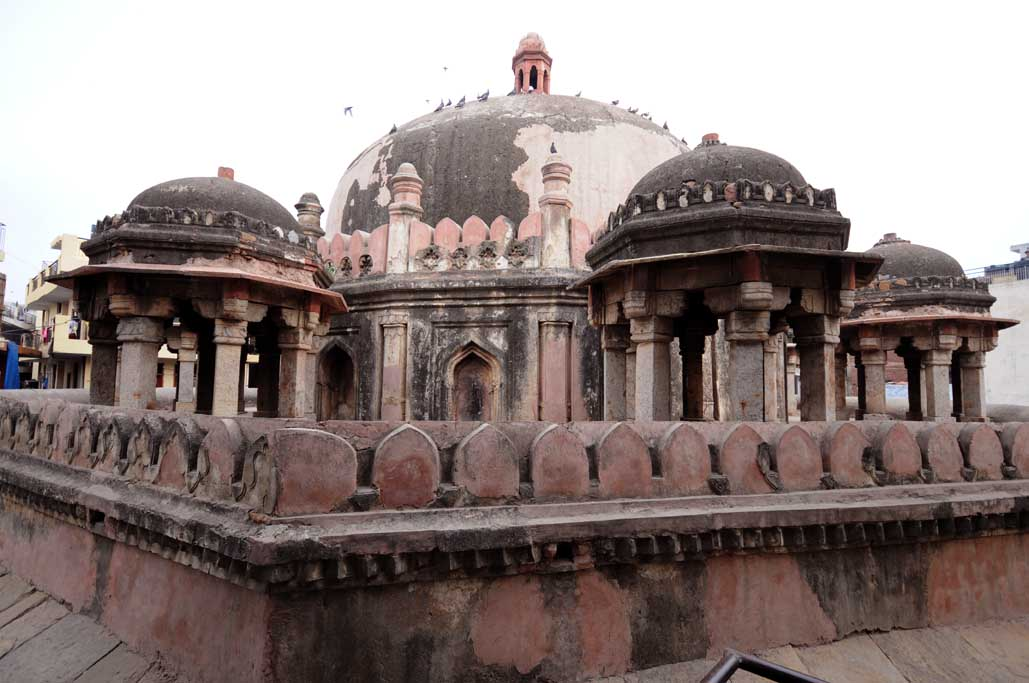
Tomb of Mubarak Shah.

Khizr Khan was succeeded by his son Mubarak Shah after his death on 20 May 1421. Mubarak Shah discontinued his father's nominal allegiance to Timur. He freely used the royal title of shah along with his own name, and professed allegiance to the caliph alone. Mubarak Shah referred to himself as Muizz-ud-Din Mubarak Shah on his coins, replacing the Timurid name with the name of the caliph, and declared himself a shah. A detailed account of his reign is available in the Tarikh-i-Mubarak Shahi written by Yahya Sirhindi. He defeated the advancing Hoshang Shah, the ruler of the Malwa Sultanate, and forced him to pay heavy tribute early in his reign. Mubarak Shah also put down the rebellion of Jasrat.

=== Muhammad Shah ===
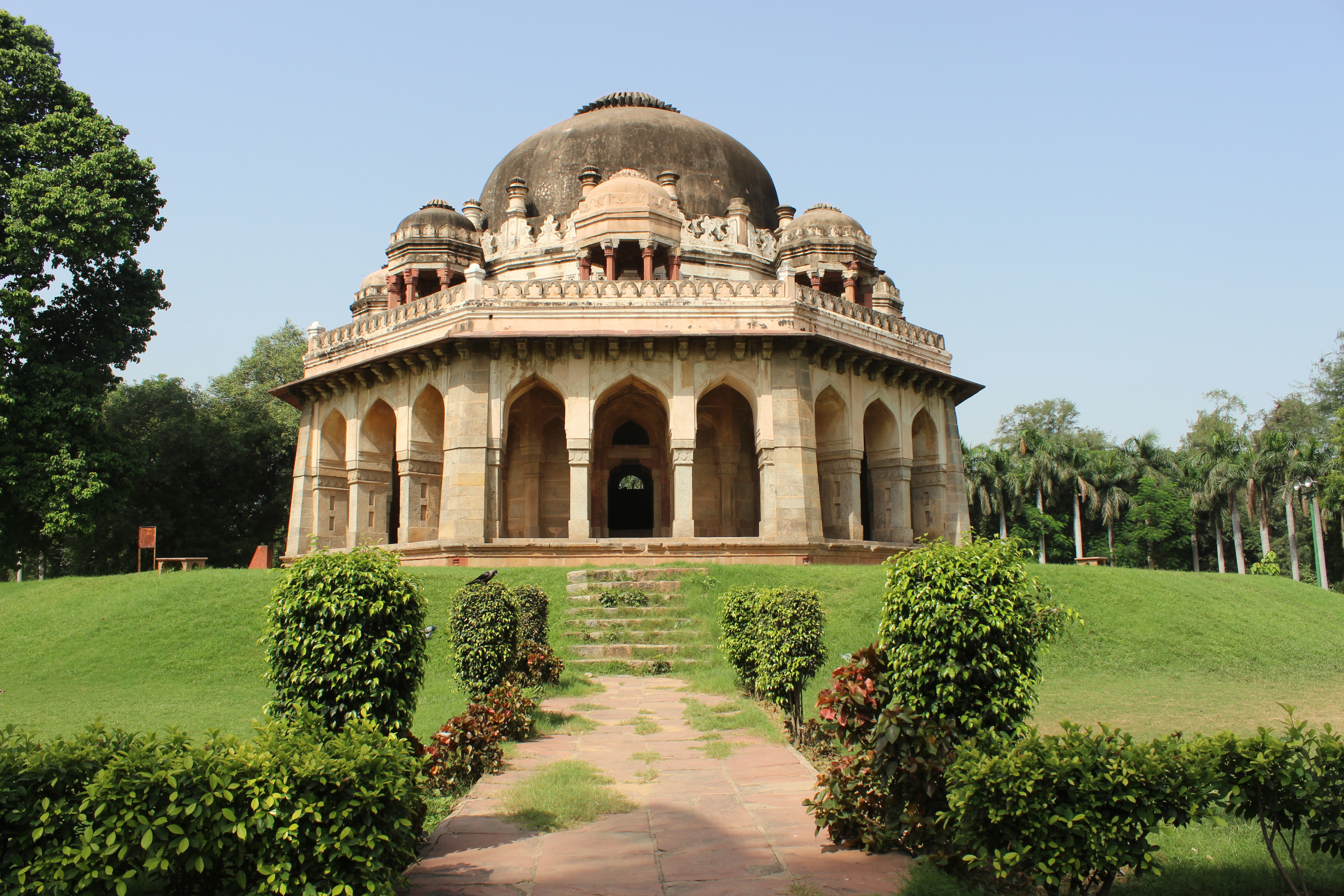
The tomb of Muhammad Shah at Lodi Gardens, New Delhi.

After the death of Mubarak Shah, his nephew, Muhammad Shah ascended the throne and styled himself as Sultan Muhammad Shah. He ruled from 1434 to 1443. Muhammad Shah had acceded to the throne with the help of vizier Sarwar ul-Mulk. Shah later freed himself from the domination of Sarwar ul-Mulk with the help of his faithful vizier Kamal ul-Mulk. His reign was marked by many rebellions and conspiracies, and he died in the year 1445. Multan became independent under the Langahs during his rule.

=== Alam Shah ===
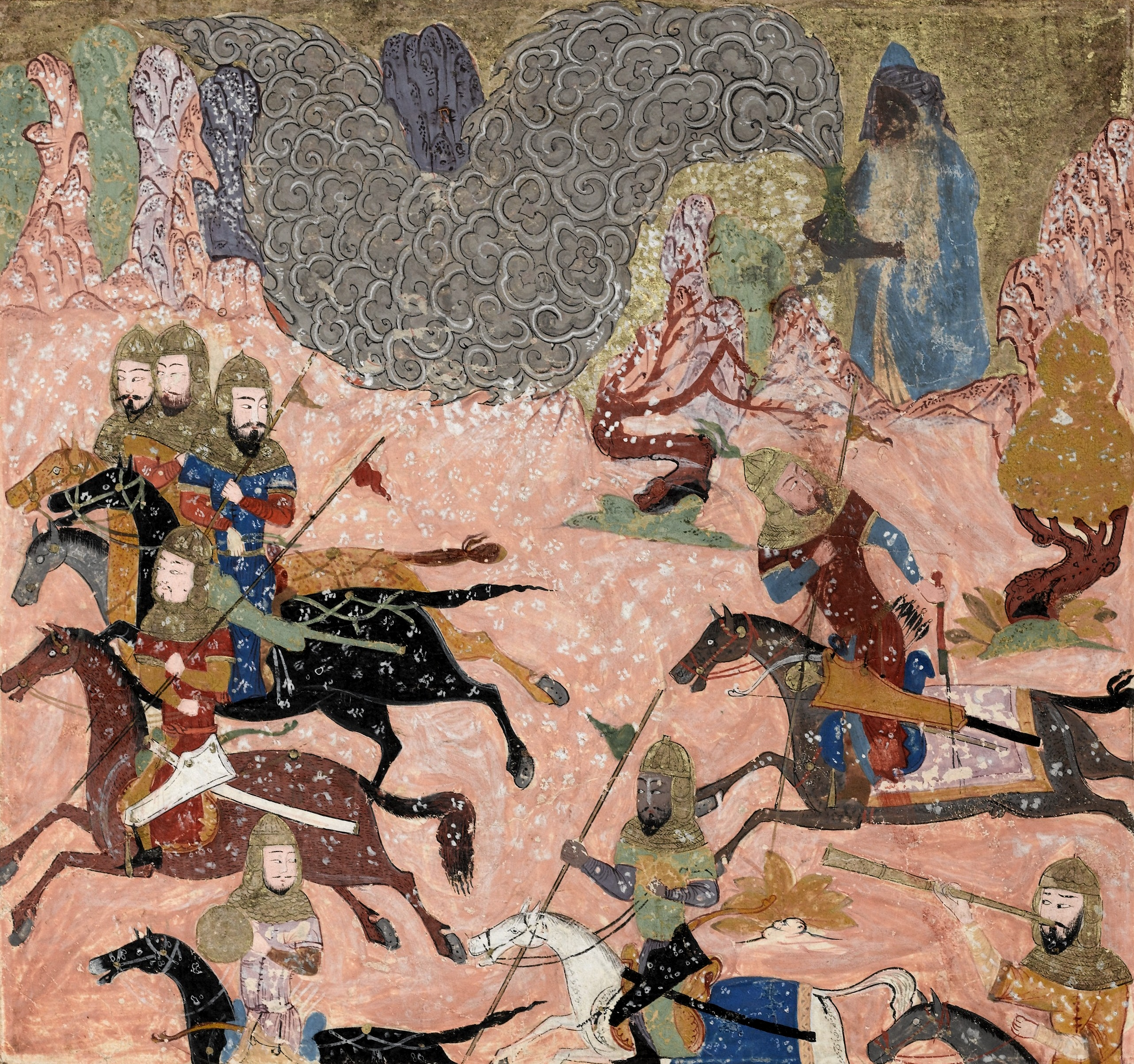
A folio from a Shahnamah ("Book of Kings"). Indian Sultanate, c. 1430–40.

Just before his death, Muhammad Shah recalled his son Alam Shah from Badaun, and nominated him as successor. Ala-ud-Din Alam Shah ruled from 1445 to 1451. He proved to be an ineffective ruler, delegating his duties to his minister Hamid Khan. He appointed Bahlol Lodi as the governor of Sirhind, who gradually gathered enough power to attack Delhi. Ala-ud-Din voluntarily abdicated the throne of the Delhi Sultanate in favour of Bahlul Khan Lodi on 19 April 1451, and left for Badaun, where he died in 1478.

== See also ==
- List of Sunni Muslim dynasties
- Persianate states

== Sources ==
- Kumar, Sunil (2020). "The Delhi Sultanate as Empire". In Bang, Peter Fibiger; Bayly, C. A.; Scheidel, Walter (eds.). The Oxford World History of Empire. Vol. 2. Oxford University Press.
- Jackson, Peter (2003). The Delhi Sultanate: A Political and Military History. Cambridge University Press.
- Mahajan, V. D. (2007). History of Medieval India. S. Chand. ISBN 9788121903646.
