= Khizr Khan =

Sultan of Delhi from 1414 to 1421

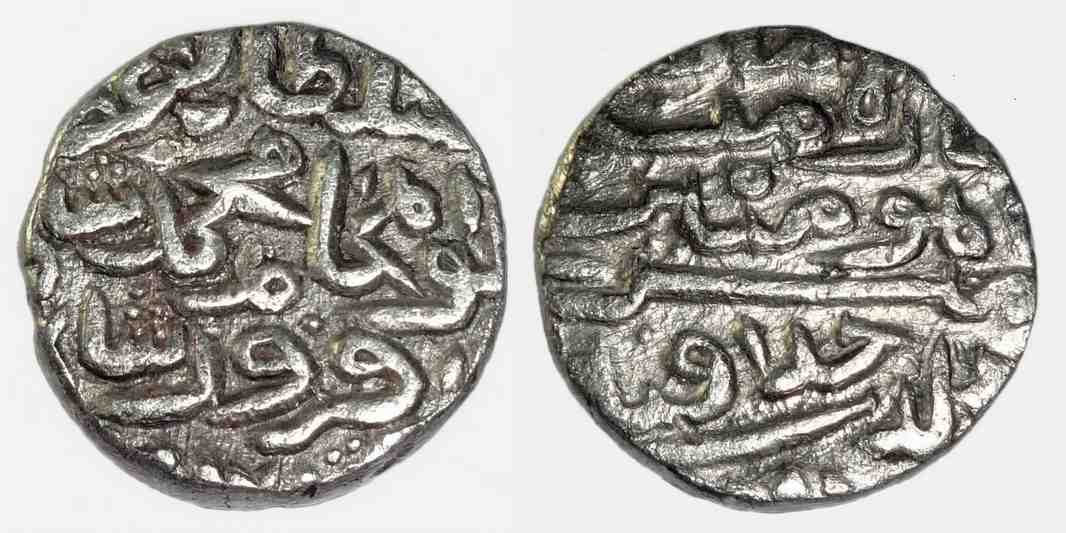
- Silver Tanka of Khizr Khan, in name of Muhammad Bin Firoz

Rayat-i-Ala of Delhi
- Reign: 28 May 1414 – 20 May 1421
- Anointment: 28 May 1414
- Predecessor: Mahmud Shah Tughluq
- Successor: Sayyid Mubarak Shah
- Emperor: Shah Rukh

Governor of Multan
- Reign: 17 December 1398 – 28 May 1414
- Predecessor: Malik Sarang Khan
- Emperor: Timur; Shah Rukh
- Reign: c. 1380 – 1395
- Predecessor: Malik Mardan Daulat
- Successor: Malik Sarang Khan
- Emperor: Firuz Shah Tughlaq; Tughluq Khan; Abu Bakr Shah; Muhammad Shah III; Sikandar Shah I
- Born: c. 1361
- Died: 20 May 1421 (aged 59–60)
- Burial: Delhi
- Issue: Sayyid Mubarak Shah
- House: Sayyid
- Father: Malik Sulaiman
- Religion: Sunni Islam

Khizr Khan (c. 1361 – 20 May 1421) was the sultan of Delhi from 1414 to 1421. He was the founder of the Sayyid dynasty, the fourth ruling dynasty of the Delhi Sultanate in northern India, soon after the invasion of Timur and the fall of the Tughlaq dynasty. Khizr Khan was the governor of Multan under the Tughlaq ruler, Firuz Shah Tughlaq, and was known to be an able administrator. He did not take up any royal title due to fear of invasion by Amir Timur (better known historically as Tamerlane) and contended himself with the titles of Rayat-i-Ala (Sublime Banners) and Masnad-i-Aali or (Most High Post). During his reign, coins were continued to be struck in the name of previous Tughlaq rulers. After his death on 20 May 1421, he was succeeded by his son Mubarak Khan, who took the title of Muizz-ud-Din Mubarak Shah.

== Early life ==
Khizr Khan was a son of Malik Sulaiman, an adopted son of Malik Mardan Daulat, the governor of Multan under Feroz Shah Tughlaq. A contemporary writer Yahya Sirhindi says in his Takhrikh-i-Mubarak Shahi that Khizr Khan was a descendant of Muhammad. Members of the dynasty derived their title, Sayyid (a title of descendants of Muhammad), based on the claim that they belonged to his lineage through his daughter Fatima. However, Yahya Sirhindi based his conclusions on unsubstantial evidence, the first being a casual recognition by Sayyid Jalaluddin Bukhari of Uch of his Sayyid heritage, and the second being the Sultan's character whose moral qualities were those of a descendant of Muhammad. Abraham Eraly is of the opinion that Khizr Khan's ancestors were likely descendants of an Arab family who had long ago settled in region of Multan during the early Tughluq period, but he doubts his Sayyid lineage.

According to Richard M. Eaton and oriental scholar Simon Digby, Khizr Khan was a Punjabi chieftain belonging to the Khokhar clan, who was sent to Timur as an ambassador and negotiator from the most adjacent area, the Punjab, ultimately became the power holder in Delhi, thanks to the contacts he had acquired. Francesca Orsini and Samira Sheikh have presented a similar view in their work.

== Reign ==
After his accession to the throne, Khizr Khan appointed Malik-us-Sharq Tuhfa as his wazir and he was given the title of Taj-ul-Mulk and he remained in office until 1421. The fiefs of Muzaffarnagar and Saharanpur were given to Sayyid Salim. Abdur Rahman received the fiefs of Multan and Fatehpur. In 1414, an army led by Taj-ul-Mulk was sent to suppress the rebellion of Har Singh, the Raja of Katehar. Raja fled to the forests but finally was compelled to surrender and agree to pay tributes in future. In July 1416 an army led by Taj-ul-Mulk was sent to Bayana and Gwalior where it plundered the peasants in the name of realising the amount equivalent to the tributes to be paid and also annexed both the regions. In 1417, Khizr Khan obtained permission from Shah Rukh to have his own name also suffixed to that of Shah Rukh. In 1418, Har Singh revolted again but was defeated completely by Taj-ul-Mulk. On 28 May 1414, Khizr Khan captured Delhi and imprisoned Daulat Khan Lodi.
