= Alam Shah =

Sultan of Delhi from 1445 to 1451

- Sultan

28th Sultan of Delhi
- Reign: 1 January 1445 – 19 April 1451
- Predecessor: Muhammad Shah
- Successor: Bahlul Lodi
- Born: 1417
- Died: July 1478 (aged 61); Budaun
- Sultan Ala-ud-Din Alam Shah
- Father: Muhammad Shah
- Religion: Islam

Ala-ud-Din Alam Shah (Persian: علاءالدین عالم شاه; r. 1445–1451) was the fourth and last ruler of the Sayyid dynasty which ruled the Delhi Sultanate. He did not go on many campaigns as a ruler and mostly spent his time reading the Quran and praying.

== Life ==
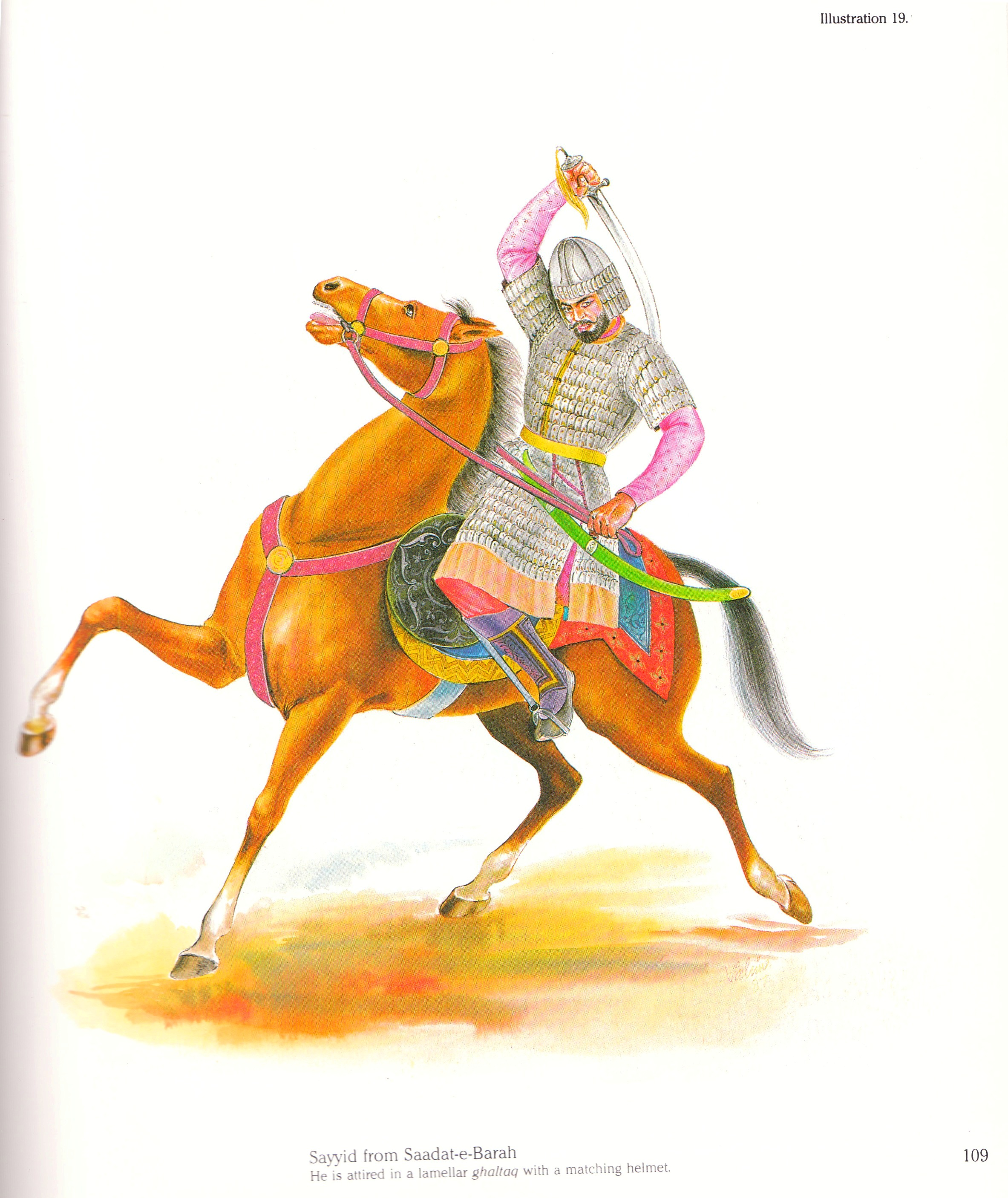
A cavalryman of the Sayyid dynasty

Alam Shah (born Ala ud-Din) succeeded his father, Muhammad Shah IV, as ruler of the Sayyid dynasty in 1445. Despite his regal title, he proved an ineffectual monarch and presided over the waning days of the Delhi Sultanate. During his brief reign, real authority had already begun shifting to Bahlul Lodi, who controlled extensive territories around Sirhind. Unable to check the growing power of his nobles, Alam Shah abandoned Delhi in 1448 and retired to Badaun, dedicating himself to personal pleasures and leaving the capital in a political void,

Sensing the opportunity, Alam Shah's vizier, Hamid Khan, feared that an ambitious outsider might seize the throne. He therefore summoned both Bahlul Lodi and Feroz Khan of Nagaur to act as puppet sultans, while he retained actual control as wazir. Bahlul, stationed closer to Delhi at Sirhind, moved swiftly; Feroz Khan's forces, still on the march, were forced to turn back in disappointment.

Later, Bahlul Lodi deceitfully removed Hamid Khan and told Alam Shah that he had assumed power, although he allowed Alam Shah to keep Badaun for the rest of his life.
