= Kushk =

Kushk or Koshk or Keveshk or Kushak or Kooshk (Persian: کوشک) may refer to:

== Afghanistan ==
- Kushk, Afghanistan, a town in Kushk District, Herat Province
- Kushk District in the northern part of Herat Province, Afghanistan
- Kushk River, a river along the boundary between Afghanistan and Turkmenistan

== India ==
- Kushak, a village in Haryana, India

== Iran ==
=== Alborz Province ===
- Kushk-e Bala, a village in Karaj County

=== Chaharmahal and Bakhtiari Province ===
- Kushk, alternate name of Shahrak-e Kushka, a village in Chaharmahal and Bakhtiari Province

=== East Azerbaijan Province ===
- Kushk, East Azerbaijan, a village in Shabestar County

=== Fars Province ===
- Kushk, Arsanjan, a village in Arsanjan County
- Kushk-e Banian, a village in Fasa County
- Kushk-e Qazi, a village in Fasa County
- Kushk-e Qazi Rural District, in Fasa County
- Kushk, Firuzabad, in Firuzabad County
- Kushk-e Qasem, in Firuzabad County
- Kushk-e Hasanabad, in Jahrom County
- Kushk Sar, in Jahrom County
- Kushk-e Sar Tang, in Jahrom County
- Kushk-e Baqeri, in Kazerun County
- Kushk-e Pas Qalat, in Kazerun County
- Kushk, Kharameh, in Kharameh County
- Kooshk, Lamerd, in Lamerd County
- Kushk, Marvdasht, in Marvdasht County
- Kushk-e Sofla, Fars, in Rostam County
- Kushk-e Hezar, in Sepidan County
- Kushk-e Hezar Rural District, in Sepidan County
- Kushk-e Mohammadabad, in Sepidan County
- Kushk-e Bidak, in Shiraz County
- Kushk-e Khalil, in Shiraz County
- Kushk-e Mowla, in Shiraz County

=== Hormozgan Province ===
- Kushk, Hormozgan, a village in Bandar Lengeh County
- Kushk-e Nar, a village in Hormozgan Province
- Kushk-e Nar Rural District, a rural district in Hormozgan Province
- Kushk-e Nar District, a district in Hormozgan Province

=== Isfahan Province ===
- Kushk, Iran, a city in Khomeyni Shahr County
- Kushk-e Kuchak, a village in Mobarakeh County
- Kushk-e Agha mohammad, located in ghamsar, near of kashan

=== Kerman Province ===
- Kushk, Kerman, a village in Anbarabad County
- Kushk-e Kalejak, a village in Anbarabad County
- Kushk-e Mur, a village in Anbarabad County
- Kushk-e Borj, a village in Baft County
- Kushk-e Olya, Kerman, a village in Baft County
- Kushk-e Sofla, Kerman, a village in Baft County
- Kushk-e Mardan, a village in Shahr-e Babak County

=== Khuzestan Province ===
- Kushk, Khuzestan, a village in Andika County
- Kushk-e Aqa Jan, a village in Andika County
- Kushk Rural District (Andika County), in Andika County

=== Kohgiluyeh and Boyer-Ahmad Province ===
- Kushk-e Zafari, a village in Basht County
- Kushk-e Abul, a village in Kohgiluyeh County
- Kushk, Kohgiluyeh, a village in Kohgiluyeh County
- Kushk, Charusa, a village in Kohgiluyeh County
- Kushk, Dishmok, a village in Kohgiluyeh County
- Kushk-e Amir ol Momeyin, a village in Kohgiluyeh County
- Kushk-e Ghandi, a village in Kohgiluyeh County

=== Lorestan Province ===
- Kushk, Borujerd, a village in Borujerd County
- Kushk, Dorud, a village in Dorud County

=== Qazvin Province ===
- Kushk, Qazvin, a village in Qazvin County

=== Razavi Khorasan Province ===
- Kushk, Khoshab, a village in Khoshab County
- Kushk, Nishapur, a village in Nishapur County
- Kushk-e Bagh, a village in Sabzevar County
- Kushk-e Mehdi, a village in Mashhad County

=== Semnan Province ===
- Kushk-e Arbabi, a village in Garmsar County
- Kushk-e Khaleseh-ye Bala, a village in Garmsar County
- Kushk-e Khaleseh-ye Pain, a village in Garmsar County

=== South Khorasan Province ===
- Kushk, South Khorasan, a village in Birjand County

=== Yazd Province ===
- Kushk, Bafq, a village in Bafq County
- Kushk Rural District (Yazd Province), in Bafq County
- Kushk, Khatam, a village in Khatam County

== See also ==
- Kushkak (disambiguation)
- Kushka (disambiguation)
