= Kushkak =

Kushkak or Koshkak (Persian: كوشكك), also rendered as Kushgak, may refer to:

== Afghanistan ==
- Kushkak, Afghanistan

== Iran ==
- Kushkak, Alborz
- Kushkak, Abadeh, Fars Province
- Kushkak, Neyriz, Fars Province
- Kushkak, Sepidan, Fars Province
- Kushkak, Shiraz, Fars Province
- Kushkak, alternate name of Ramjerd, Fars Province, Iran
- Kushkak, Khuzestan
- Kushkak-e Kushk, Khuzestan Province
- Kushkak, Kohgiluyeh and Boyer-Ahmad
- Kushkak, Ashtian, Markazi Province
- Kushkak, Zarandieh, Markazi Province
- Kushkak, Mazandaran
- Kushkak, Qazvin
- Kushkak, Takestan, Qazvin Province
- Kashkak, Razavi Khorasan
- Koshkak, Razavi Khorasan
- Kushkak, Razavi Khorasan
- Kushkak, alternate name of Kushk, Nishapur, Razavi Khorasan Province
- Kushkak, South Khorasan
- Kushkak, Tehran

== See also ==
- Kashkak (disambiguation)
- Kushk (disambiguation)
