= Gushk =

Gushk (Persian: گوشك) may refer to:

- Gushk Bala
- Gushk Pain

== See also ==
- Kushk (disambiguation)
