= Kakan =

Kakan may refer to:

== Places ==
- Kakan (island)
- Kakan, Afghanistan
- Kakan, Iran
- Kakan Rural District, in Kohgiluyeh and Boyer-Ahmad Province, Iran

== Other ==
- Genpuku, a Japanese ceremony
- Kakan (language), an extinct language spoken in northern Argentina and Chile
- Kakan, a Rajput clan

== See also ==
- Kaakan, a 2015 Indian Marathi-language film
