= Kushka =

Kushka may refer to:

- Serhetabat, Turkmenistan
- Kushka, Balkh, Afghanistan
- Kushk, Borujerd, Iran
- Kushka (film), a 2018 Indian Kannada-language drama film by Vikram Yoganand

== See also ==
- Kushk (disambiguation)
- Kushak, a village in Haryana, India
