= Kushk-e Pain =

Kushk-e Pain (Persian: كوشك پائين) may refer to:

- Kushk-e Pain, Fars
- Kushk-e Pain, Kerman
- Kushk-e Pain, Semnan

== See also ==
- Kushk-e Sofla (disambiguation)
