= Jarmosht =

Jarmosht or Jarmasht (Persian: جرمشت), also rendered as Garmosht or Jarmast, may refer to:

- Garmosht, Khonj County
- Jarmosht-e Bala, Jahrom County
- Jarmosht-e Pain, Jahrom County
