= Ziqan =

Ziqan زيقان
- Village
- Location within Iran
- Coordinates: 28°39′27″N 53°00′09″E
- Country: Iran
- Province: Fars
- County: Jahrom
- Bakhsh: Simakan
- Rural District: Pol Beh Pain

Population (2006)
  - Total: 221
- Time zone: UTC+3:30 (IRST)
  - Summer (DST): UTC+4:30 (IRDT)

Ziqan (Persian: زيقان, also Romanized as Zīqān; also known as Zīqūn) is a village in Pol Beh Pain Rural District, Simakan District, Jahrom County, Fars province, Iran. At the 2006 census, its population was 221, in 45 families.
