= Now Dad =

Now Dad نوداد
- Village
- Location within Iran
- Coordinates: 28°41′46″N 52°58′11″E
- Country: Iran
- Province: Fars
- County: Jahrom
- Bakhsh: Simakan
- Rural District: Pol Beh Bala

Population (2006)
  - Total: 355
- Time zone: UTC+3:30 (IRST)
  - Summer (DST): UTC+4:30 (IRDT)

Now Dad (Persian: نوداد, also Romanized as Now Dād) is a village in Pol Beh Bala Rural District, Simakan District, Jahrom County, Fars province, Iran. At the 2006 census, its population was 355, in 73 families.
