= Mazekan =

Mazekan مزكان
- Village
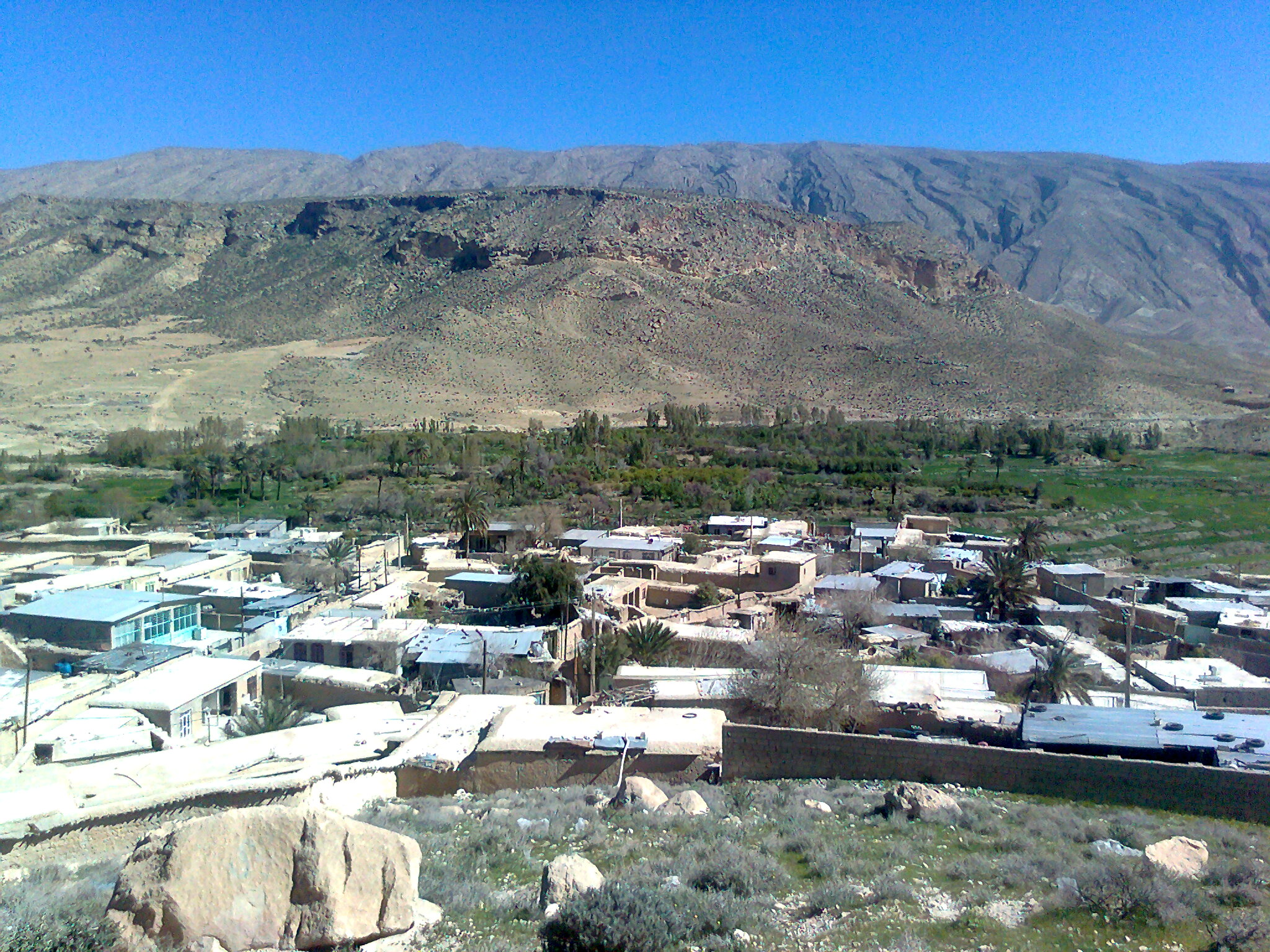

- Location within Iran
- Coordinates: 28°43′33″N 52°53′43″E
- Country: Iran
- Province: Fars
- County: Jahrom
- Bakhsh: Simakan
- Rural District: Pol Beh Bala

Population (2006)
  - Total: 934
- Time zone: UTC+3:30 (IRST)
  - Summer (DST): UTC+4:30 (IRDT)

Mazekan (Persian: مزكان, also Romanized as Mazekān; also known as Mazeh Kān) is a village in Pol Beh Bala Rural District, Simakan District, Jahrom County, Fars province, Iran. At the 2006 census, its population was 934, in 206 families.
