= Kabeh =

Kabeh كبه
- Village
- Country: Iran
- Province: Fars
- County: Jahrom
- Bakhsh: Simakan
- Rural District: Pol Beh Pain

Population (2006)
  - Total: 29
- Time zone: UTC+3:30 (IRST)
  - Summer (DST): UTC+4:30 (IRDT)

Kabeh (Persian: كبه) is a village in Pol Beh Pain Rural District, Simakan District, Jahrom County, Fars province, Iran. At the 2006 census, its population was 29, in 8 families.

== See also ==
- Kabeh, the 1986 song and album by Iranian singer Moein;
- the Holy Ka'bah, the most sacred site in Islam.
