= Kushk-e Sofla =

Kushk-e Sofla and Kooshk Sofla (Persian: كوشك سفلي) may refer to:

- Kushk-e Sofla, Fars
- Kushk-e Sofla, Kerman
- Kushk-e Sofla, Lorestan
