= Zagh =

Zagh زاغ
- Village
- Location within Iran
- Coordinates: 28°39′54″N 53°00′31″E
- Country: Iran
- Province: Fars
- County: Jahrom
- Bakhsh: Simakan
- Rural District: Pol Beh Pain

Population (2006)
  - Total: 457
- Time zone: UTC+3:30 (IRST)
  - Summer (DST): UTC+4:30 (IRDT)

Zagh (Persian: زاغ, also Romanized as Zāgh) is a village in Pol Beh Pain Rural District, Simakan District, Jahrom County, Fars province, Iran. At the 2006 census, its population was 457, in 96 families.
