= Tir Afjan =

Tir Afjan تيرافجان
- Village
- Location within Iran
- Coordinates: 28°42′53″N 53°01′01″E
- Country: Iran
- Province: Fars
- County: Jahrom
- Bakhsh: Simakan
- Rural District: Posht Par

Population (2006)
  - Total: 195
- Time zone: UTC+3:30 (IRST)
  - Summer (DST): UTC+4:30 (IRDT)

Tir Afjan (Persian: تيرافجان, also Romanized as Tīr Afjān; also known as Tīramjān) is a village in Posht Par Rural District, Simakan District, Jahrom County, Fars province, Iran. At the 2006 census, its population was 195, in 40 families.
