= Pol Beh =

Pol Beh (Persian: پل به) may refer to:

- Pol Beh Bala Rural District
- Pol Beh Pain Rural District
