= Iduyeh =

Iduyeh ايدويه
- Village
- Location within Iran
- Coordinates: 28°45′36″N 53°03′17″E
- Country: Iran
- Province: Fars
- County: Jahrom
- Bakhsh: Simakan
- Rural District: Posht Par

Population (2006)
  - Total: 188
- Time zone: UTC+3:30 (IRST)
  - Summer (DST): UTC+4:30 (IRDT)

Iduyeh (Persian: ايدويه, also Romanized as Īdūyeh) is a village in Posht Par Rural District, Simakan District, Jahrom County, Fars province, Iran. At the 2006 census, its population was 188, in 44 families.
