= Cheshivan =

Cheshivan چشيوان
- Village
- Location within Iran
- Coordinates: 28°37′18″N 53°07′51″E
- Country: Iran
- Province: Fars
- County: Jahrom
- Bakhsh: Simakan
- Rural District: Pol Beh Pain

Population (2006)
  - Total: 137
- Time zone: UTC+3:30 (IRST)
  - Summer (DST): UTC+4:30 (IRDT)

Cheshivan (Persian: چشيوان, also Romanized as Cheshīvān; also known as Cheshevān and Cheyshvān) is a village in Pol Beh Pain Rural District, Simakan District, Jahrom County, Fars province, Iran. At the 2006 census, its population was 137, in 31 families.
