= Toremeh =

Toremeh ترمه
- Village
- Location within Iran
- Coordinates: 28°42′37″N 53°02′42″E
- Country: Iran
- Province: Fars
- County: Jahrom
- Bakhsh: Simakan
- Rural District: Posht Par

Population (2006)
  - Total: 223
- Time zone: UTC+3:30 (IRST)
  - Summer (DST): UTC+4:30 (IRDT)

Toremeh (Persian: ترمه, also Romanized as Tormeh) is a village in Posht Par Rural District, Simakan District, Jahrom County, Fars province, Iran. At the 2006 census, its population was 223, in 58 families.
