= Mohit Ab =

Mohit Ab محيطاب
- Village
- Location within Iran
- Coordinates: 28°39′47″N 53°00′45″E
- Country: Iran
- Province: Fars
- County: Jahrom
- Bakhsh: Simakan
- Rural District: Pol Beh Pain

Population (2006)
  - Total: 190
- Time zone: UTC+3:30 (IRST)
  - Summer (DST): UTC+4:30 (IRDT)

Mohit Ab (Persian: محيطاب, also Romanized as Moḩīţ Āb; also known as Moḩīţā) is a village in Pol Beh Pain Rural District, Simakan District, Jahrom County, Fars province, Iran. At the 2006 census, its population was 190, in 35 families.
