= Ab Sheykh =

Ab Sheykh اب شيخ
- Village
- Location within Iran
- Coordinates: 28°39′04″N 53°00′37″E
- Country: Iran
- Province: Fars
- County: Jahrom
- Bakhsh: Simakan
- Rural District: Pol Beh Pain

Population (2006)
  - Total: 298
- Time zone: UTC+3:30 (IRST)
  - Summer (DST): UTC+4:30 (IRDT)

Ab Sheykh (Persian: اب شيخ, also Romanized as Āb Sheykh and Āb-e Sheykh) is a village in Pol Beh Pain Rural District, Simakan District, Jahrom County, Fars province, Iran. At the 2006 census, its population was 298, in 67 families.
