= Kushk-e Olya =

Kushk-e Olya or Kooshk Olya (Persian: كوشك عليا) may refer to:

- Kushk-e Olya, Kerman
- Kushk-e Olya, Kohgiluyeh and Boyer-Ahmad

== See also ==
- Kushk-e Bala
