= Jonbed =

Jonbed جنبد
- Village
- Location within Iran
- Coordinates: 28°43′01″N 53°02′06″E
- Country: Iran
- Province: Fars
- County: Jahrom
- Bakhsh: Simakan
- Rural District: Posht Par

Population (2006)
  - Total: 91
- Time zone: UTC+3:30 (IRST)
  - Summer (DST): UTC+4:30 (IRDT)

Jonbed (Persian: جنبد; also known as Jombed, Jonbeh, and Jonīd) is a village in Posht Par Rural District, Simakan District, Jahrom County, Fars province, Iran. At the 2006 census, its population was 91, in 20 families.
