= Dasht-e Dal =

Dasht-e Dal دشتدال
- Village
- Location within Iran
- Coordinates: 28°41′16″N 53°08′18″E
- Country: Iran
- Province: Fars
- County: Jahrom
- Bakhsh: Simakan
- Rural District: Posht Par

Population (2006)
  - Total: 181
- Time zone: UTC+3:30 (IRST)
  - Summer (DST): UTC+4:30 (IRDT)

Dasht-e Dal (Persian: دشتدال, also Romanized as Dasht-e Dāl, Dasht Dāl, and Dasht-i-Dal; also known as Dashteh Āl) is a village in Posht Par Rural District, Simakan District, Jahrom County, Fars province, Iran. At the 2006 census, its population was 181, in 41 families.
