= Deh Qanun =

Deh Qanun ده قانون
- Village
- Location within Iran
- Coordinates: 28°43′00″N 53°06′59″E
- Country: Iran
- Province: Fars
- County: Jahrom
- Bakhsh: Simakan
- Rural District: Posht Par

Population (2006)
  - Total: 169
- Time zone: UTC+3:30 (IRST)
  - Summer (DST): UTC+4:30 (IRDT)

Deh Qanun (Persian: ده قانون, also Romanized as Deh Qānūn and Deh-e Qānūn; also known as Dehbānū) is a village in Posht Par Rural District, Simakan District, Jahrom County, Fars province, Iran. At the 2006 census, its population was 169, in 42 families.
