= Qomabad, Fars =

Qomabad قم اباد
- Village
- Location within Iran
- Coordinates: 28°40′29″N 53°05′10″E
- Country: Iran
- Province: Fars
- County: Jahrom
- Bakhsh: Simakan
- Rural District: Posht Par

Population (2006)
  - Total: 145
- Time zone: UTC+3:30 (IRST)
  - Summer (DST): UTC+4:30 (IRDT)

Qomabad (Persian: قم اباد, also Romanized as Qomābād) is a village in Posht Par Rural District, Simakan District, Jahrom County, Fars province, Iran. At the 2006 census, its population was 145, in 32 families.
