= Kushk-e Bala (disambiguation) =

Kushk-e Bala is a village in Alborz Province, Iran.

Kushk-e Bala (Persian: كوشك بالا) may also refer to:

- Kushk-e Bala, Kerman
- Kushk-e Bala, Kohgiluyeh and Boyer-Ahmad
- Kushk-e Bala, Semnan
