= Keradeh =

Keradeh or Karadeh or Karradeh (Persian: كراده) may refer to:

- Keradeh, Khafr
- Karadeh, Simakan
