= Amir Salar =

Amir Salar (Persian: اميرسالار) may refer to:

- Amir Salar-e Olya, Firuzabad County
- Amir Salar, Jahrom
- Amir Salar-e Sar Tang, Jahrom County
