= Asfal =

Asfal اسفل
- Village
- Location within Iran
- Coordinates: 28°43′21″N 52°56′15″E
- Country: Iran
- Province: Fars
- County: Jahrom
- Bakhsh: Simakan
- Rural District: Pol Beh Bala

Population (2006)
  - Total: 526
- Time zone: UTC+3:30 (IRST)
  - Summer (DST): UTC+4:30 (IRDT)

Asfal (Persian: اسفل, also Romanized as Esfal) is a village in Pol Beh Bala Rural District, Simakan District, Jahrom County, Fars province, Iran. At the 2006 census, its population was 526, in 128 families.
