= Arjuyeh =

Village in Fars province, Iran

Arjuyeh Persian: ارجويه
- Village
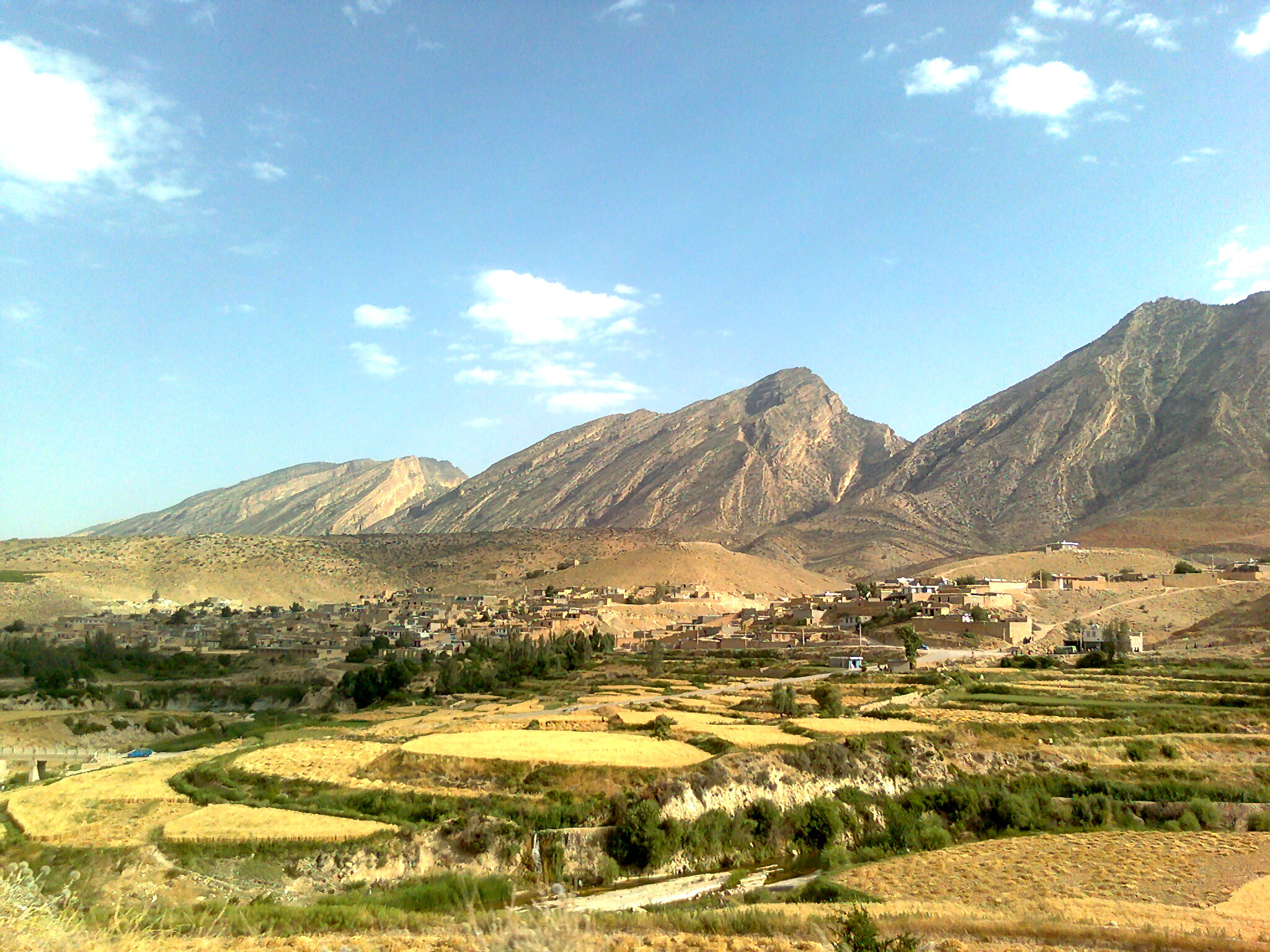

- Location within Iran
- Coordinates: 28°43′57″N 52°52′14″E
- Country: Iran
- Province: Fars
- County: Jahrom
- District: Simakan
- Rural District: Pol Beh Bala

Population (2016)
  - Total: 1,741
- Time zone: UTC+3:30 (IRST)

Arjuyeh (Persian: ارجويه) (Note: Also romanized as Ārjūyeh; also known as Argū and Ārgū) is a village in Pol Beh Bala Rural District of Simakan District, Jahrom County, Fars province, Iran.

== Demographics ==
=== Population ===
At the time of the 2006 National Census, the village's population was 1,585 in 323 households. The following census in 2011 counted 1,677 people in 442 households. The 2016 census measured the population of the village as 1,741 people in 500 households. It was the most populous village in its rural district.
