= Vaina =

Vaina may refer to:

- Vaina (surname)
- Vaina, Uttar Pradesh, village in Khair municipality of Aligarh district in Uttar Pradesh, India
- Väina, the Estonian name of Daugava river
- Vaina (drink), traditional Chilean cocktail
