= Kakan, Iran =

Kakan كاكان
- Village
- Location within Iran
- Coordinates: 28°43′43″N 52°54′31″E
- Country: Iran
- Province: Fars
- County: Jahrom
- Bakhsh: Simakan
- Rural District: Pol Beh Bala

Population (2006)
  - Total: 529
- Time zone: UTC+3:30 (IRST)
  - Summer (DST): UTC+4:30 (IRDT)

Kakan (Persian: كاكان, also Romanized as Kākān; also known as Kākūn and Qal‘eh-i-Gokūn) is a village in Pol Beh Bala Rural District, Simakan District, Jahrom County, Fars province, Iran. At the 2006 census, its population was 529, in 112 families.
