= Jarmosht-e Pain =

Jarmosht-e Pain جرمشت پايين
- Village
- Location within Iran
- Coordinates: 28°44′05″N 53°04′15″E
- Country: Iran
- Province: Fars
- County: Jahrom
- Bakhsh: Simakan
- Rural District: Posht Par

Population (2006)
  - Total: 229
- Time zone: UTC+3:30 (IRST)
  - Summer (DST): UTC+4:30 (IRDT)

Jarmosht-e Pain (Persian: جرمشت پايين, also Romanized as Jarmosht-e Pā‘īn; also known as Char Ḩasht, Garmosht, Jarmasht, Jarmast, and Jarmosht) is a village in Posht Par Rural District, Simakan District, Jahrom County, Fars province, Iran. At the 2006 census, its population was 229, in 60 families.
