= Shaghun, Simakan =

Village in Fars province, Iran

Shaghun Persian: شاغون
- Village
- Location within Iran
- Coordinates: 28°38′58″N 53°05′36″E
- Country: Iran
- Province: Fars
- County: Jahrom
- District: Simakan
- Rural District: Pol Beh Pain

Population (2016)
  - Total: 798
- Time zone: UTC+3:30 (IRST)

Shaghun (Persian: شاغون) (Note: Also romanized as Shāghūn) is a village in, and the capital of, Pol Beh Pain Rural District of Simakan District, Jahrom County, Fars province, Iran.

== Demographics ==
=== Population ===
At the time of the 2006 National Census, the village's population was 733 in 147 households. The following census in 2011 counted 798 people in 200 households. The 2016 census measured the population of the village as 798 people in 208 households. It was the most populous village in its rural district.
