= Esfanjan, Fars =

Esfanjan اسفنجان
- Village
- Location within Iran
- Coordinates: 28°43′13″N 53°03′11″E
- Country: Iran
- Province: Fars
- County: Jahrom
- Bakhsh: Simakan
- Rural District: Posht Par

Population (2006)
  - Total: 365
- Time zone: UTC+3:30 (IRST)
  - Summer (DST): UTC+4:30 (IRDT)

Esfanjan (Persian: اسفنجان, also Romanized as Esfanjān) is a village in Posht Par Rural District, Simakan District, Jahrom County, Fars province, Iran. At the 2006 census, its population was 365, in 101 families.
