= Behjan =

Village in Fars province, Iran

Behjan Persian: بهجان
- Village
- Location within Iran
- Coordinates: 28°48′52″N 52°59′25″E
- Country: Iran
- Province: Fars
- County: Jahrom
- District: Simakan
- Rural District: Posht Par

Population (2016)
  - Total: 1,619
- Time zone: UTC+3:30 (IRST)

Behjan (Persian: بهجان) (Note: Also romanized as Behjaan) is a village in Posht Par Rural District of Simakan District, Jahrom County, Fars province, Iran.

== Demographics ==
=== Population ===
At the time of the 2006 National Census, the village's population was 1,641 in 405 households. The following census in 2011 counted 1,414 people in 434 households. The 2016 census measured the population of the village as 1,619 people in 494 households. It was the most populous village in its rural district.
