= Karadeh, Simakan =

Karadeh كراده
- Village
- Location within Iran
- Coordinates: 28°44′21″N 52°51′33″E
- Country: Iran
- Province: Fars
- County: Jahrom
- Bakhsh: Simakan
- Rural District: Pol Beh Bala

Population (2006)
  - Total: 762
- Time zone: UTC+3:30 (IRST)
  - Summer (DST): UTC+4:30 (IRDT)

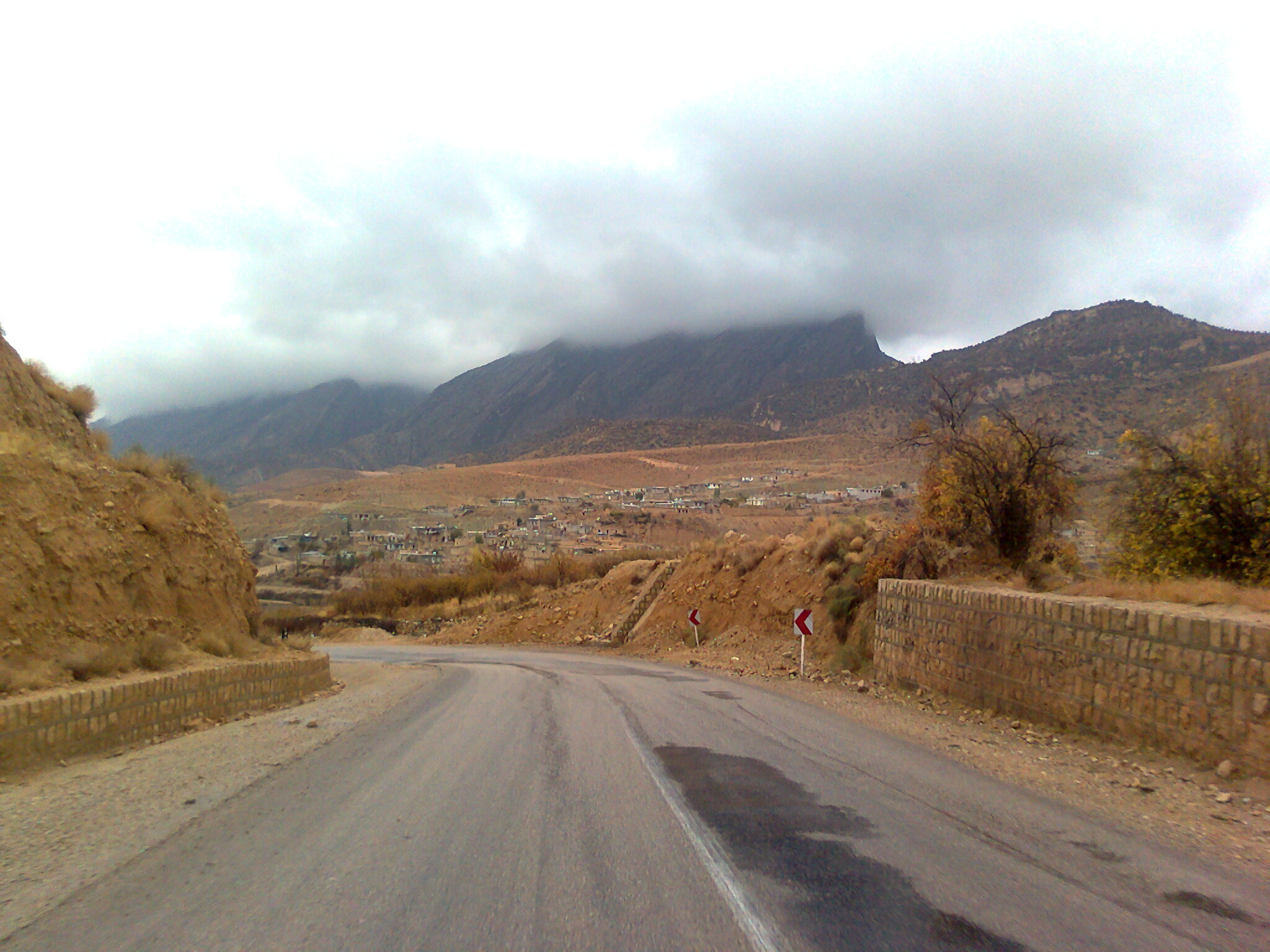
View of Karadeh Village from Simakan road.

Karadeh (Persian: كراده, also Romanized as Karādeh and Karrādeh) is a village in Pol Beh Bala Rural District, Simakan District, Jahrom County, Fars province, Iran. At the 2006 census, its population was 762, in 172 families.
