= Barak, Iran =

Barak or Berak or Borak (Persian: برك or براك) in Iran may refer to:

- Barak, Bushehr (برك - Barak)
- Barak, Jahrom, Fars Province (براك - Barāk)
- Berak, Larestan, Fars Province (براك - Berāk)
- Barak, South Khorasan (برك - Barak)
