= Kotla Mubarakpur Complex =

Tomb and mosque complex in Central Delhi, India

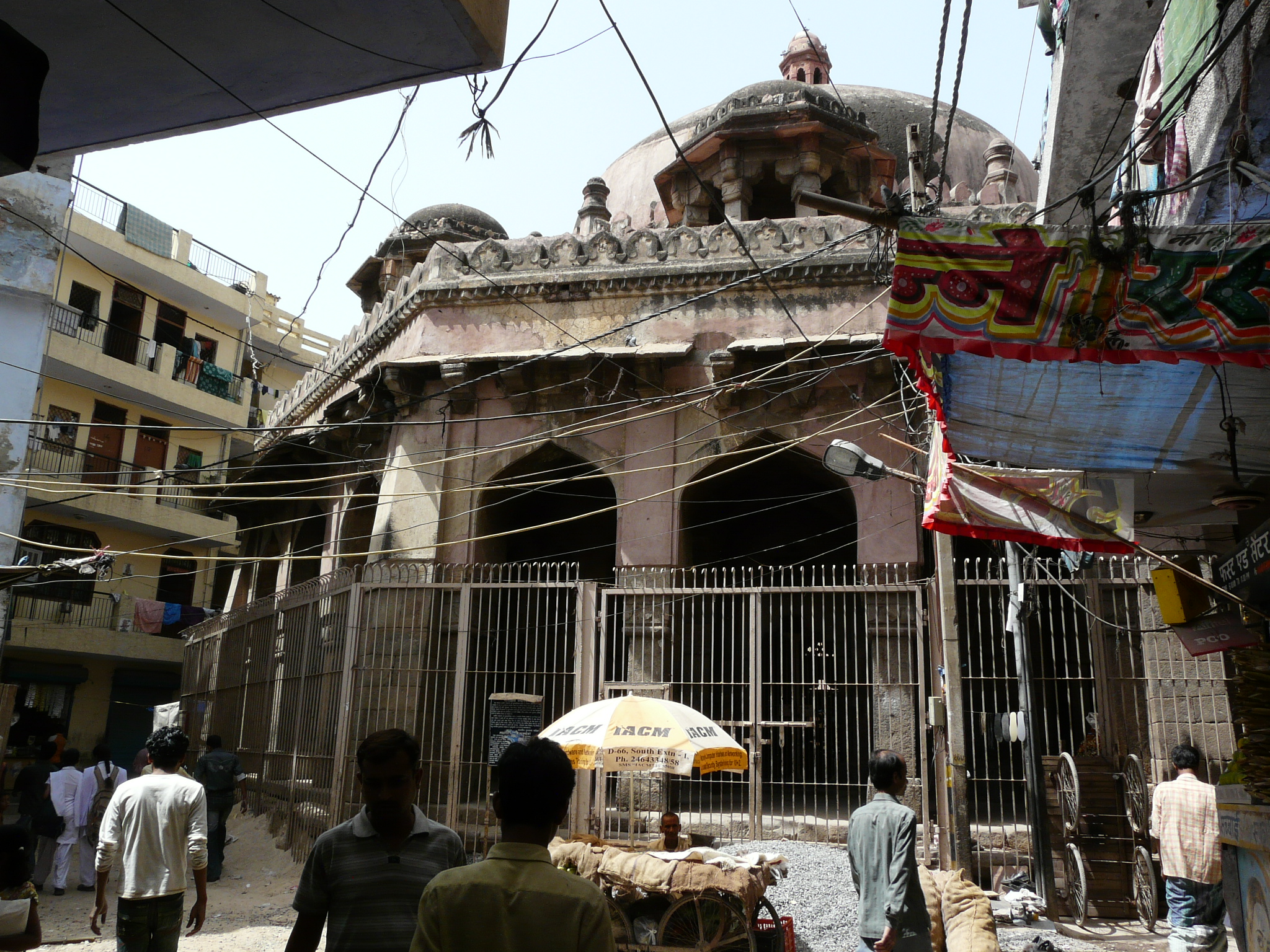
- Tomb of Mubarak Shah

- Location of Kotla Mubarakpur Complex in Central Delhi

Religion
- Affiliation: Islam
- Ecclesiastical or organizational status: Tombs and mosque
- Status: Active
- Dedication: Mubarak Shah and others

Location
- Location: Kotla Mubarakpur, South Delhi
- Country: India
- Interactive map of Kotla Mubarakpur Complex
- Coordinates: 28°35′29″N 77°14′31″E

Architecture
- Type: Mosque architecture
- Style: Sayyid; Lodi; Tughlaq
- Founder: Sayyid dynasty
- Completed: 1434 CE

Specifications
- Direction of façade: West
- Dome: Many (number unknown)
- Materials: Red sandstone

Monument of National Importance
- Official name: Tomb of Mubarak Shah
- Reference no.: N-DL-106

Monument of National Importance
- Official name: Inchla Wali Gunti; Kala Gumbad; Tombs of Bade-Khan and Mubarakpur Kotla; Tombs of Chote Khan; Mosque attached to Mubarak Shah Tomb; Tomb of Bhura Khan
- Reference no.: N-DL-102–105, 107–108

The Kotla Mubarakpur Complex is a mausoleum and mosque complex, located in Kotla Mubarakpur, a medieval urban village in the South Delhi district of Delhi, India. The history of the complex can be traced to the prominent tomb of Muizud Din Mubarak Shah, son of Khizr Khan of the Sayyid dynasty of the 15th century Delhi Sultanate. The complex includes a mosque and several other tombs of the Lodi dynasty period, including the Darya Khan's tomb, Kale Khan ka Gumbad, Bare Khan ka Gumbad, Chote Khan Ka Gumbad and Bhure Khan ka Gumbad, and also a baoli (step well).

Various structures in the complex are Monuments of National Importance, and administered by the Archaeological Survey of India.

== History ==
Muizud Din Mubarak Shah, better known as Mubarak Shah, succeeded his father, Khizr Khan, as Delhi Sultanate, the leader of the Sayyid dynasty. Mubarak Shah established a city called Mubarakabad on the banks of the Yamuna River. However, no trace of it exists now. Mubarak Shah died in 1434 CE and he was buried in Kotla Mubarakpur, named in his honour.

== Structures ==
=== Mubarak Shah's tomb ===
Mubarak Shah's tomb is an impressive structure, built in a fusion of Lodi style octagonal plan combined with Tughlaq style buttresses and wide dome, enclosed in an octagonal compound. The south and west gates have been retained, while the compound walls and other gates have disappeared. The Sultan personally planned its construction during his lifetime. It has a southern entrance into the octagonal hall, which has arched openings on three sides, except in the west, which has the mihrab, in the prayer direction.

The tombs of Mubarak Shah and Muhammad Shah are strikingly similar, although built ten years apart and in different locations. It is quite possible that both monuments were built by the same architect. One major difference lies in the different heights of the dome in proportion to the rest of the building. Mubarak's tomb has a dome 1.2 metres (4 ft) lower than that of Muhammad, and it makes the dome out of proportion with the rest of the building. Thus, Mubarak's dome is too small for the size of the drum and the base of the verandah, and too flat to be attractive.

A verandah, with three entrances, encloses the hall. The hall and the verandah are provided with supporting sloping buttresses at the corners. A sixteen sided fortification, with turrets in each corner, supports the low dome structure. The turrets are crowned by a lantern. Chattris (kiosks) in octagonal shape adorn the roof on each side. Three tiers of Quranic inscriptions adorn the springing of the ceiling of the dome. Though stunted in appearance, it is considered as a typical example of octagonal Sayyid tombs, which were popular during Lodi and Mughal periods. The overall effect of the tomb is of a pyramidal appearance.

=== Kotla Mubarakpur mosque ===
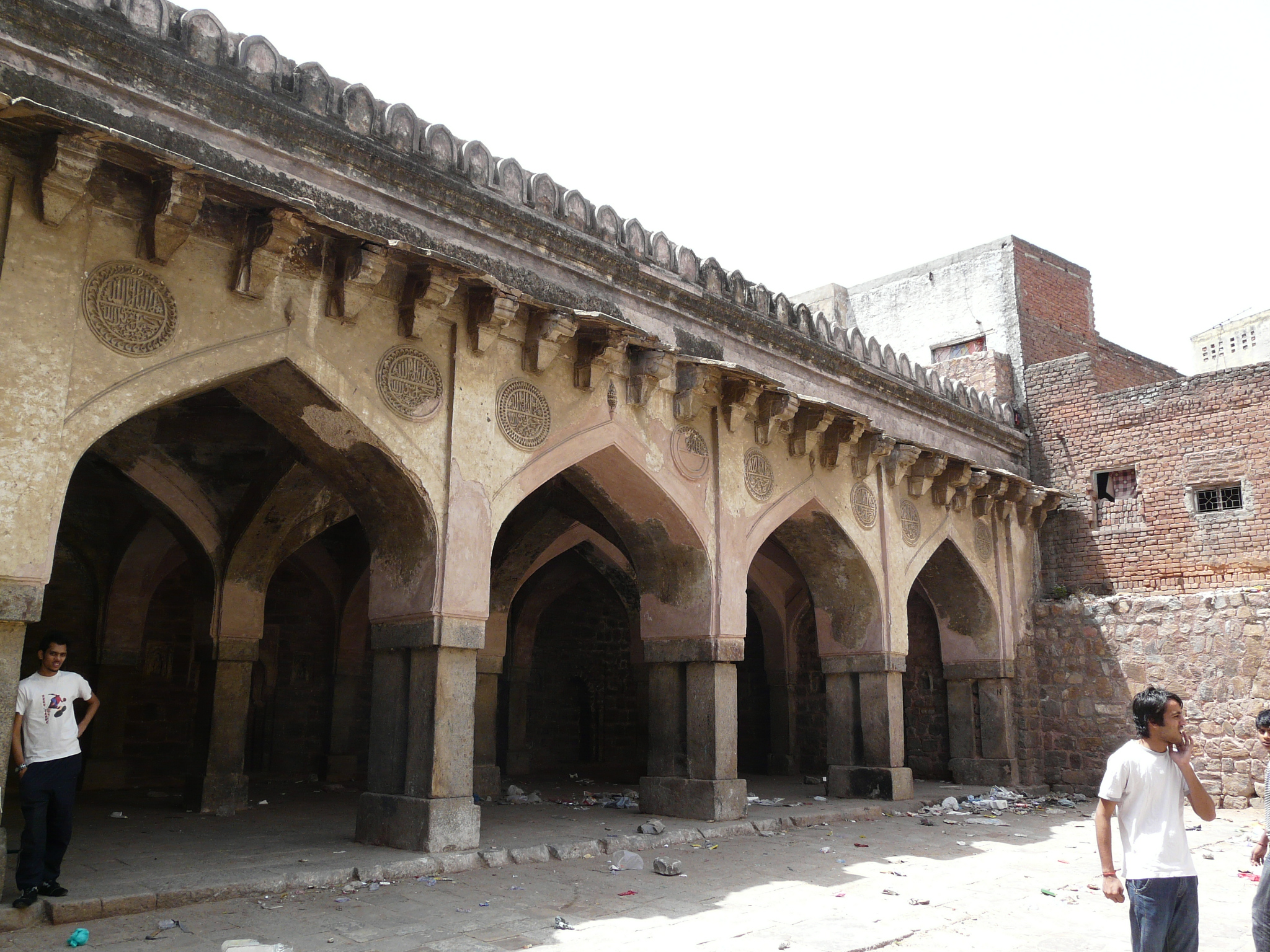
Kotla Mubarakpur mosque

Adjoining the tomb, there is a "funerary mosque" meant as a venue for prayers, and making public addresses by the visitors to the tomb. The mosque is located on the west wall of the tomb. It has two bays depth wise and five bays width wise and is decorated with arches supported on pillars.

=== Other tombs ===
In the precincts of the Kotla Mubarakpur tomb and mosque, there are many other tombs of the Lodi period. These are (see gallery):

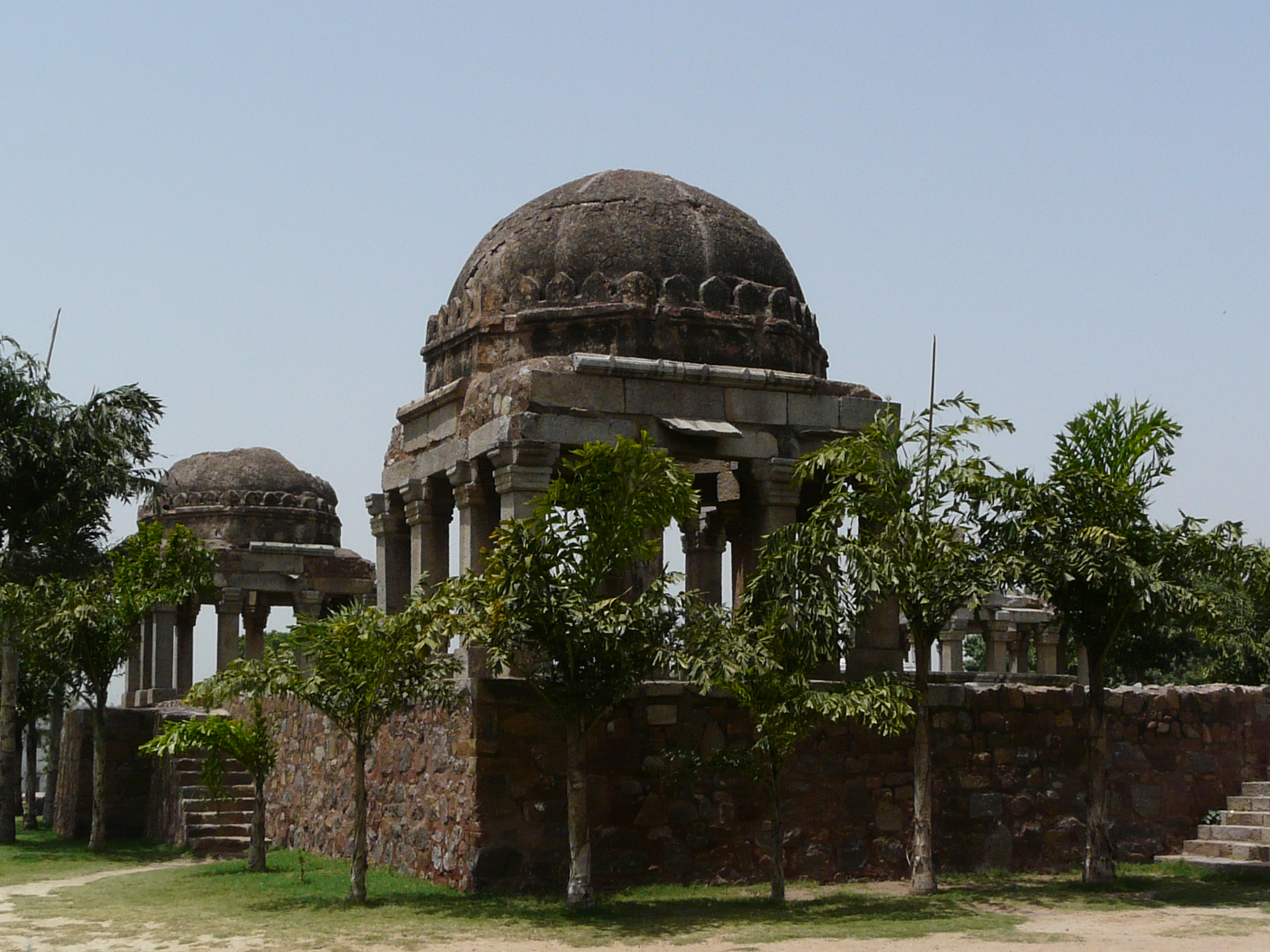
Darya Khan's tomb

Darya Khan's tomb

Darya Khan Lohani's tomb is dated from the early 16th century. Darya Khan was the Chief Justice during the reign of Bahlol Lodi and vakil (advocate) during Sikander Lodi's rule. Considered an unusual tomb, most of the structure is in ruins. It has a commemorative circular platform structure built amidst a larger platform. Chaatris (kiosks) are seen at the corners. It has been deduced that when built the tomb had an impressive layout with a beautiful view.

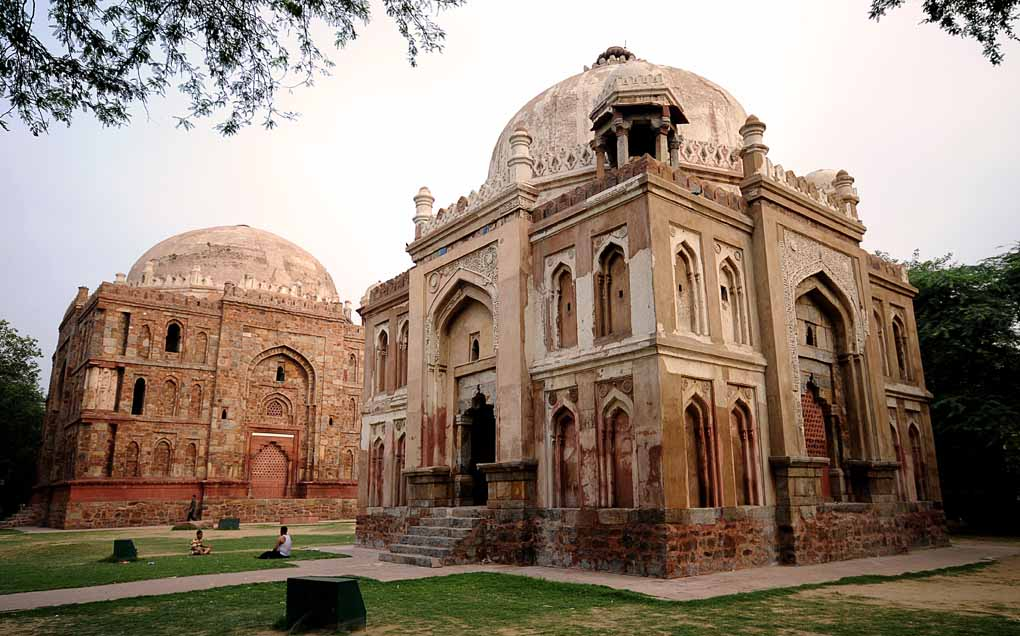
Tombs of Bade Khan and Chote Khan

Bade Khan ka gumbad

This is an impressive tomb monument with an intricate frontage. The central bay of the tomb is flanked by three rows of three niches. The central niche in each row is larger than the other two. Another unusual depiction for a Lodi period tomb is of the octagonal shaped turrets at the four corners. Chattris (12 pillared) adorn the top of the four turrets. The interior of the domed Chatris have ornamentation with incised and painted plaster bands with a decorative medallion in the centre. It is spread over an area of 22 square metres (240 ft^{2}).

Chote Khan ka gumbad

This tomb considered to be built in "classic proportions" is located next to the Bade Khan's tomb, which has a wonderful and well-maintained interior. The exterior walls of the tomb, particularly at the entry, has carved plasterwork.

Kale Khan ka gumbad

This tomb is dated from 1481 CE as per an inscription on the mihrab inside the tomb. Kale Khan was a courtier in the Lodi period during the reign of Bahlol Lodi. It is conjectured that his father was Darya Khan Lohani. There is a tall cenotaph in an otherwise usual Lodi-type tomb. Its location is 300 metres (980 ft) north of the Ring Road. It is stated to be the earliest dated tomb of the Lodi period.

== Visitor information ==
Kotla Mubarakpur classified by the Delhi Development Authority as an urban village which is dominated by baisla gotra of Gurjars. It is situated within close distance of South Extension and Defence Colony, to the east. The nearest Delhi Metro stations are South Extension, Dilli Haat - INA and Lajpat Nagar.

Kotla Mubarakapur and South Extension are busy city centres easily approachable by road, rail and air communications. The main artery, Ring Road of Delhi, passes near Kotla Mubarakpur complex. The nearest railway stations are New Delhi Railway Station and Nizamuddin Railway Station, 12 kilometres (7.5 mi) and 8 kilometres (5.0 mi) away respectively. Indira Gandhi International Airport is 14 kilometres (8.7 mi) away.

== Gallery ==
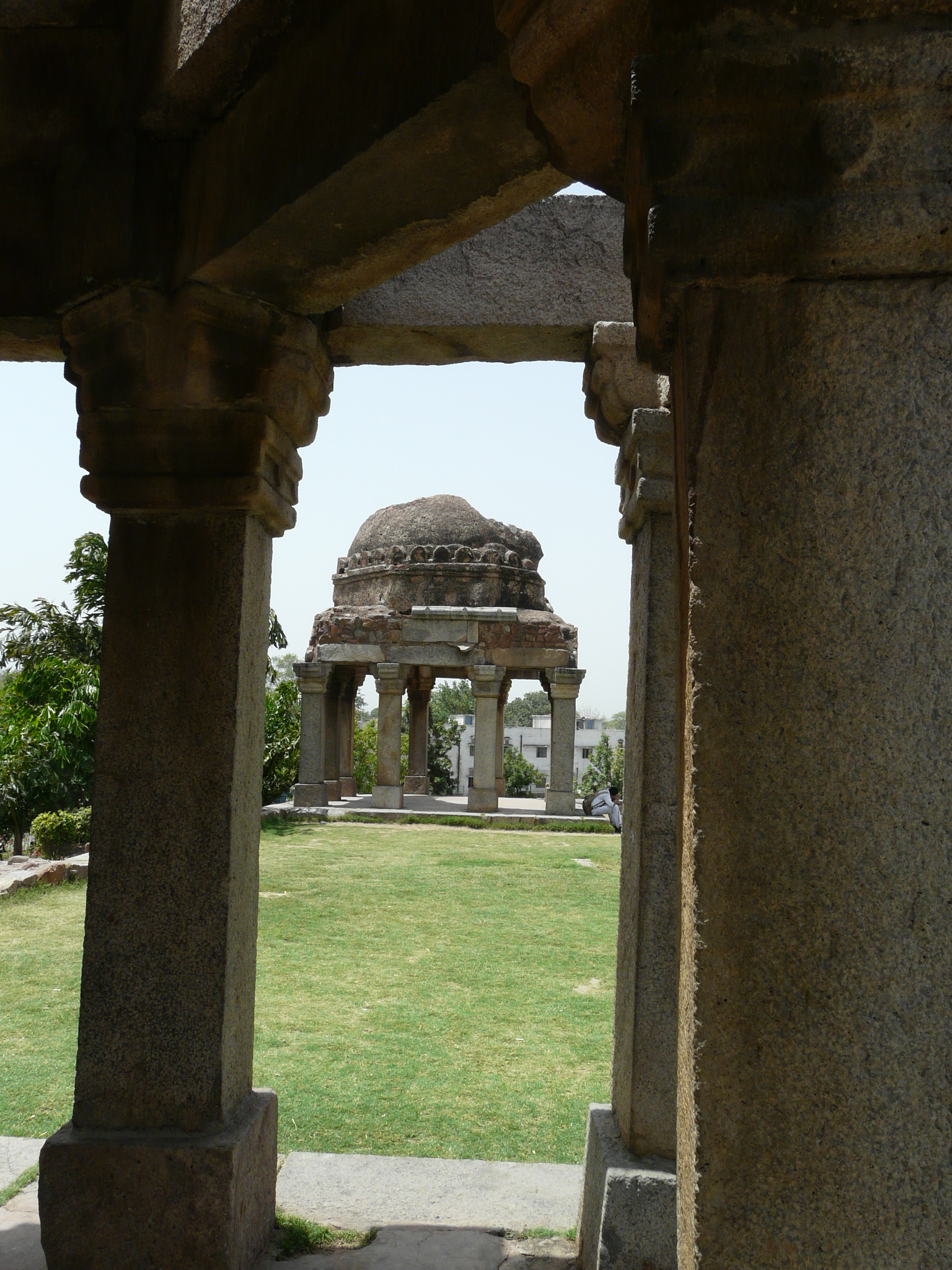
Darya Khan Lohani's tomb

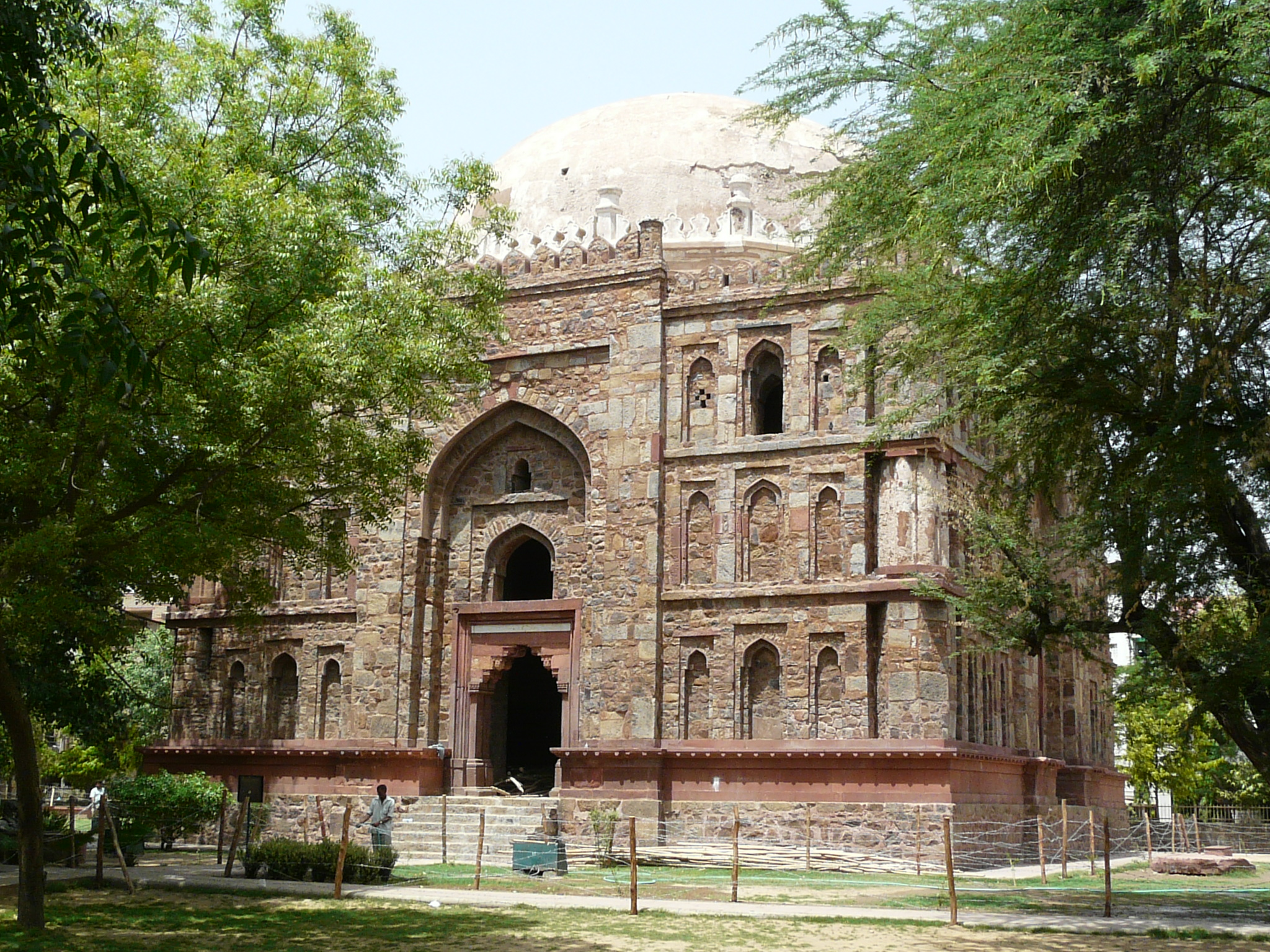
Bade Khan Gumbad

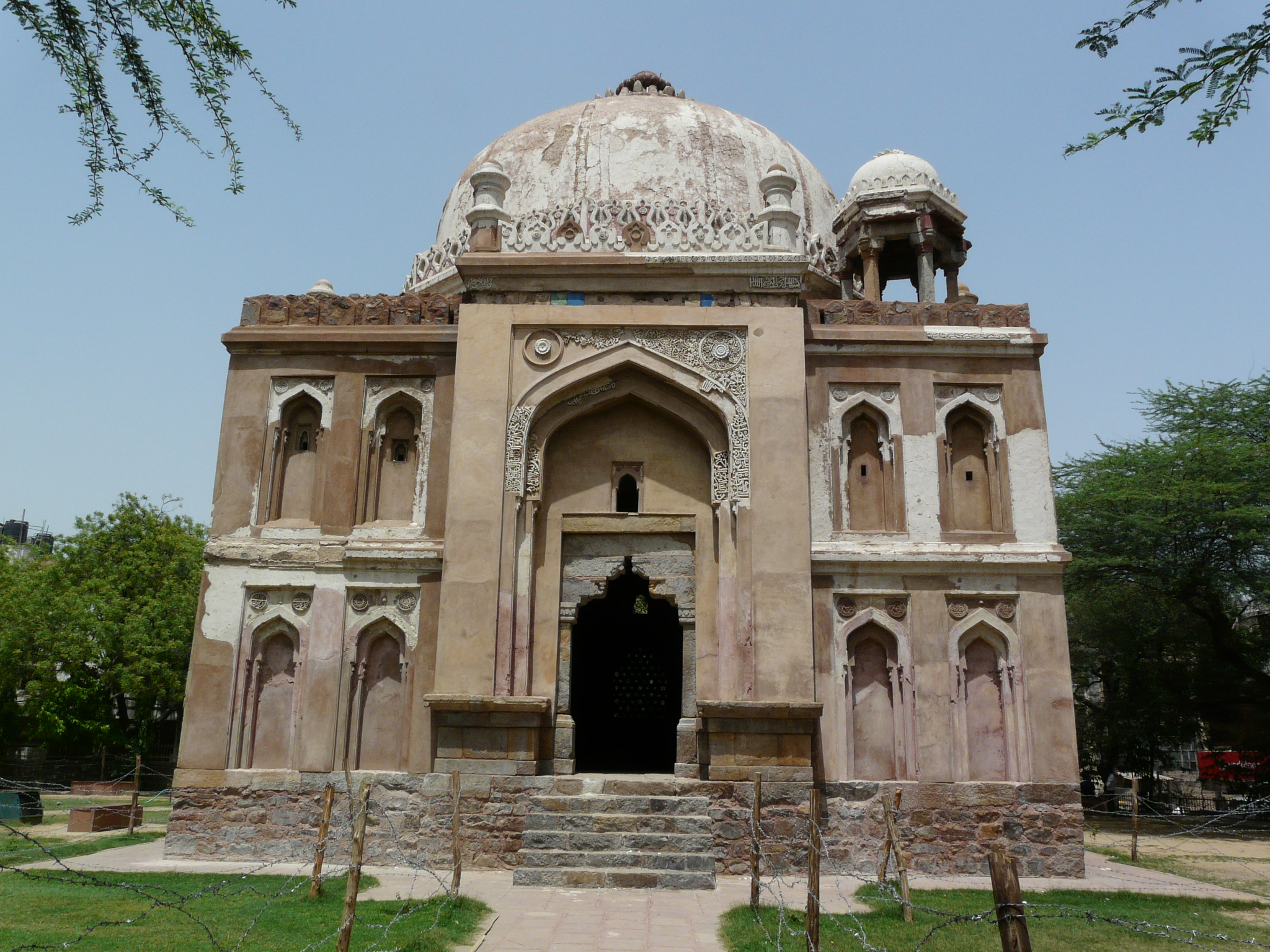
Chote Khan ka Gumbad

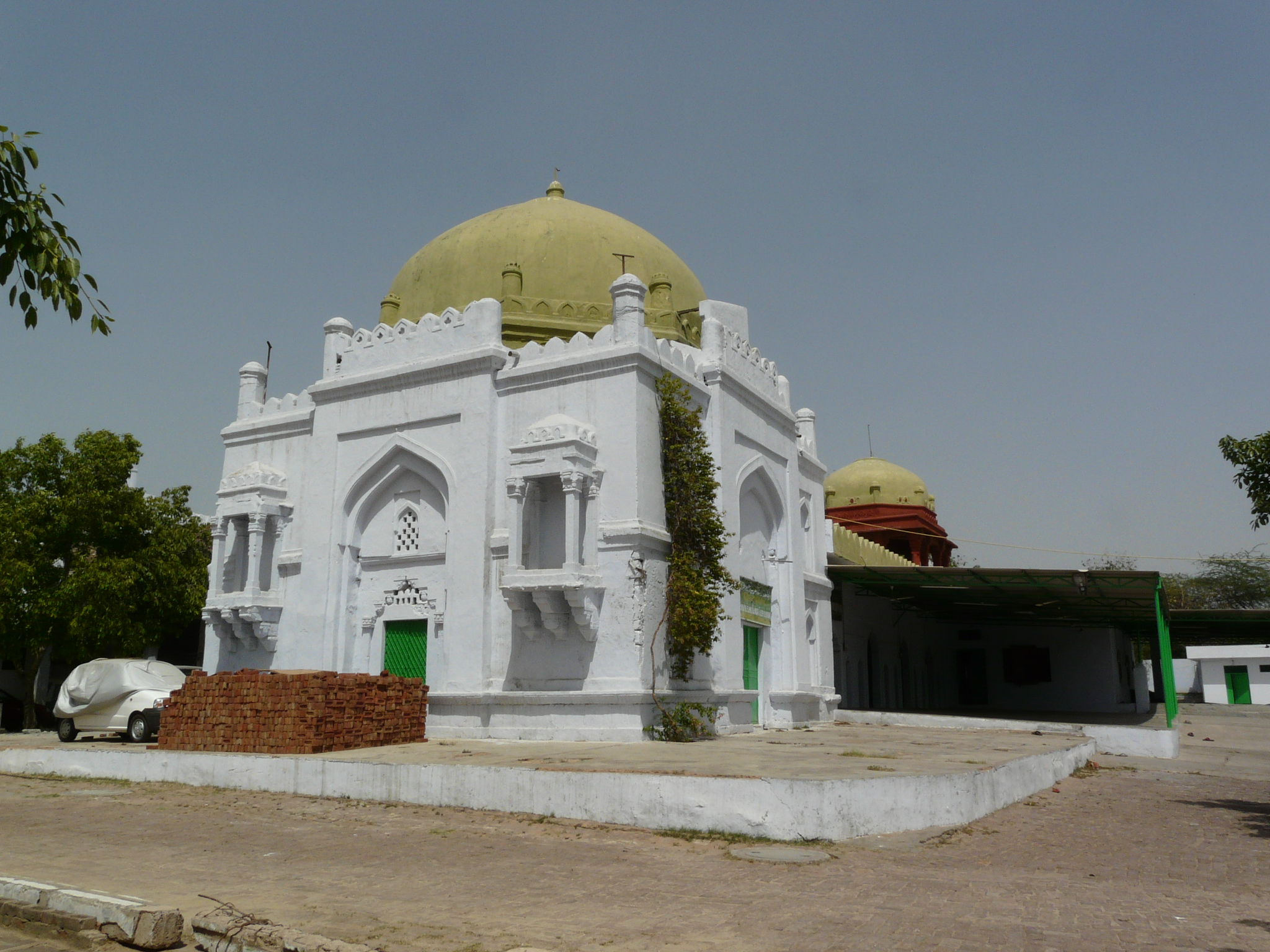
Tomb of Khwaja Sara basti Khan

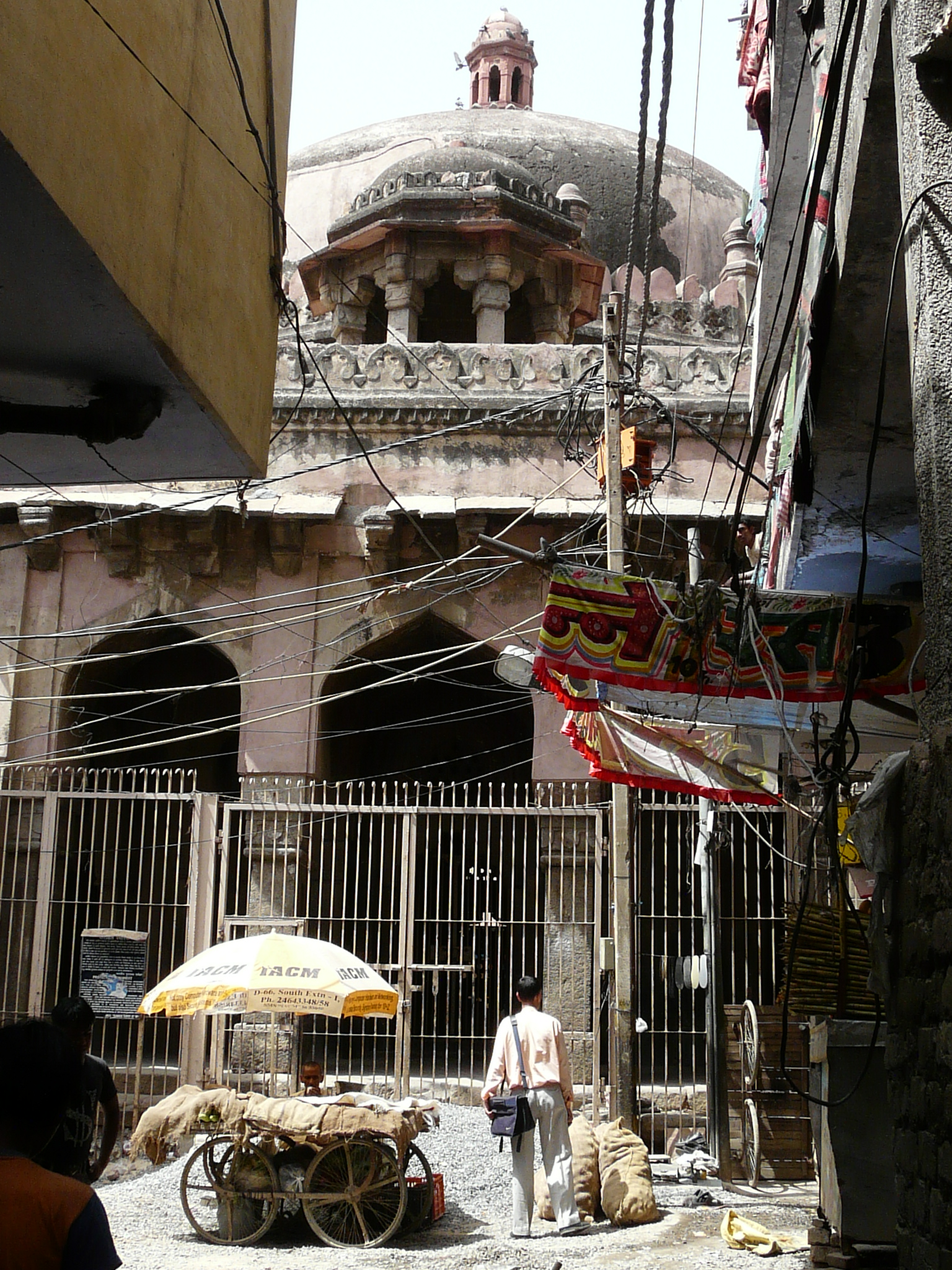
Mubarak Shah's tomb

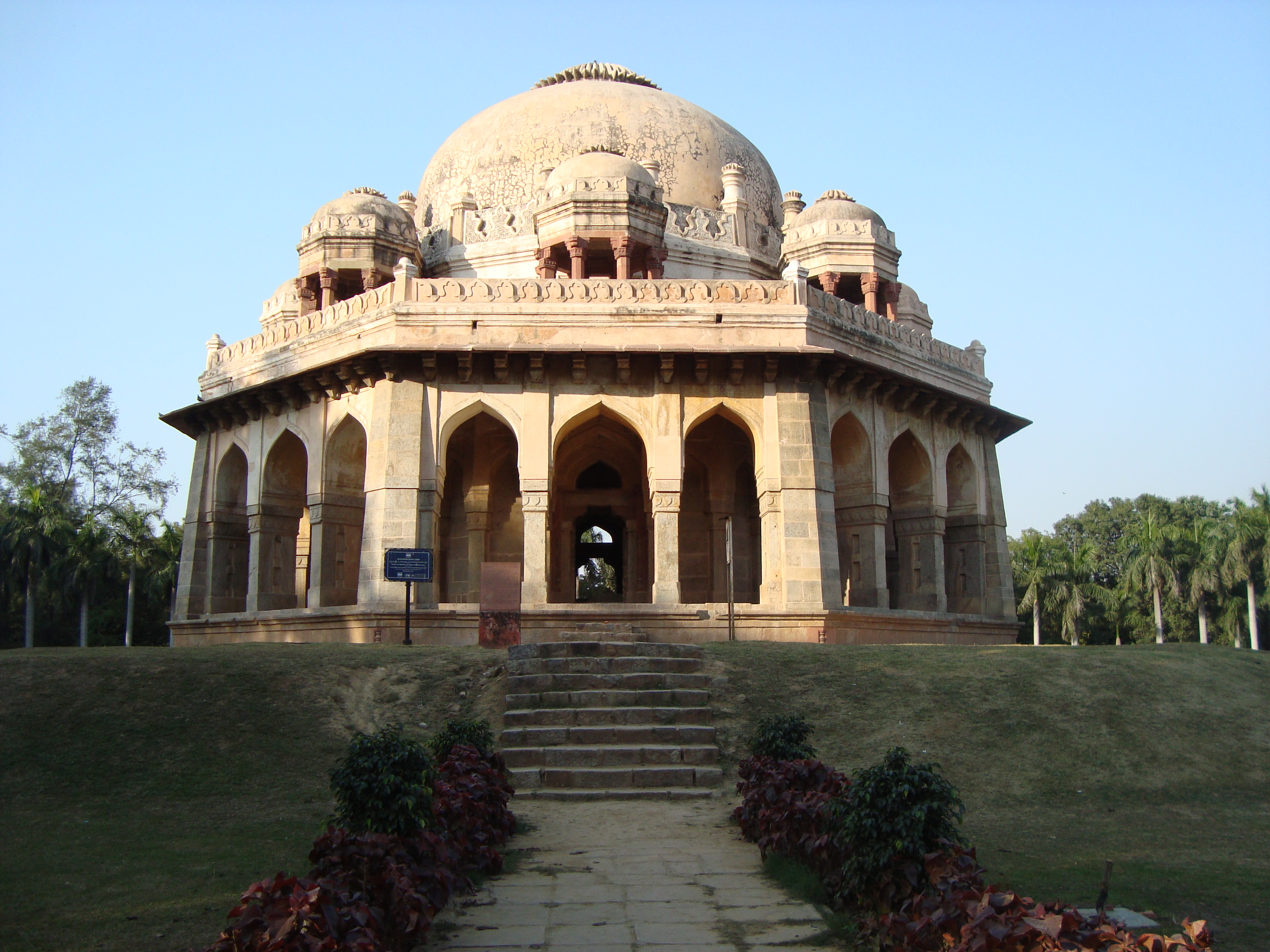
Tomb of Muhammad Shah, successor of Mubarak Khan

== See also ==
- Islam in India
- List of mosques in India
- List of Monuments of National Importance in Delhi
