= Kushk-e Hasanabad =

Kushk-e Hasanabad كوشك حسن اباد
- Village
- Location within Iran
- Coordinates: 28°48′09″N 53°01′44″E
- Country: Iran
- Province: Fars
- County: Jahrom
- Bakhsh: Simakan
- Rural District: Posht Par

Population (2006)
  - Total: 344
- Time zone: UTC+3:30 (IRST)
  - Summer (DST): UTC+4:30 (IRDT)

Kushk-e Hasanabad (Persian: كوشك حسن اباد, also Romanized as Kūshk-e Ḩasanābād; also known as Kūshk) is a village in Posht Par Rural District, Simakan District, Jahrom County, Fars province, Iran. At the 2006 census, its population was 344, in 72 families.
