= Barak, Jahrom =

Barak براك
- Village
- Location within Iran
- Coordinates: 28°38′50″N 53°09′01″E
- Country: Iran
- Province: Fars
- County: Jahrom
- Bakhsh: Simakan
- Rural District: Pol Beh Pain

Population (2006)
  - Total: 308
- Time zone: UTC+3:30 (IRST)
  - Summer (DST): UTC+4:30 (IRDT)

Barak (Persian: براك, also Romanized as Barāk, Berak, Borāk, and Borak; also known as Parak) is a village in Pol Beh Pain Rural District, Simakan District, Jahrom County, Fars province, Iran. At the 2006 census, its population was 308, in 68 families.
