= Esfanjan =

Esfanjan (Persian: اسفنجان) may refer to:

- Esfanjan, East Azerbaijan
- Esfanjan, Fars
