= Chiraiyakot =

- City
- Location in Uttar Pradesh, India
- Coordinates: 26.03°N 83.56°E
- Country: India
- State: Uttar Pradesh
- District: Mau
- Elevation: 66 m (217 ft)

Population (2017)
  - Total: 155,781

Languages
  - Official: Hindi
- Time zone: UTC+5:30 (IST)
- PIN: 276129
- Vehicle registration: UP.54
- Website: https://npchiraiyakot.in/

Chiraiyakot is a town in Mau district in the Indian state of Uttar Pradesh. The old Chiraiyakot town is segmented into different 'Mohallas'. Historically, this region was ruled and under the control of royal family of the Suryavanshi Kakan Rajputs. They trace their origins to Raghuvanshi Kshatriya from legendary Ikshvaku dynasty and decendants of lord Shri Ram
