= Duzeh =

City in Fars province, Iran

Duzeh Persian: دوزه
- City
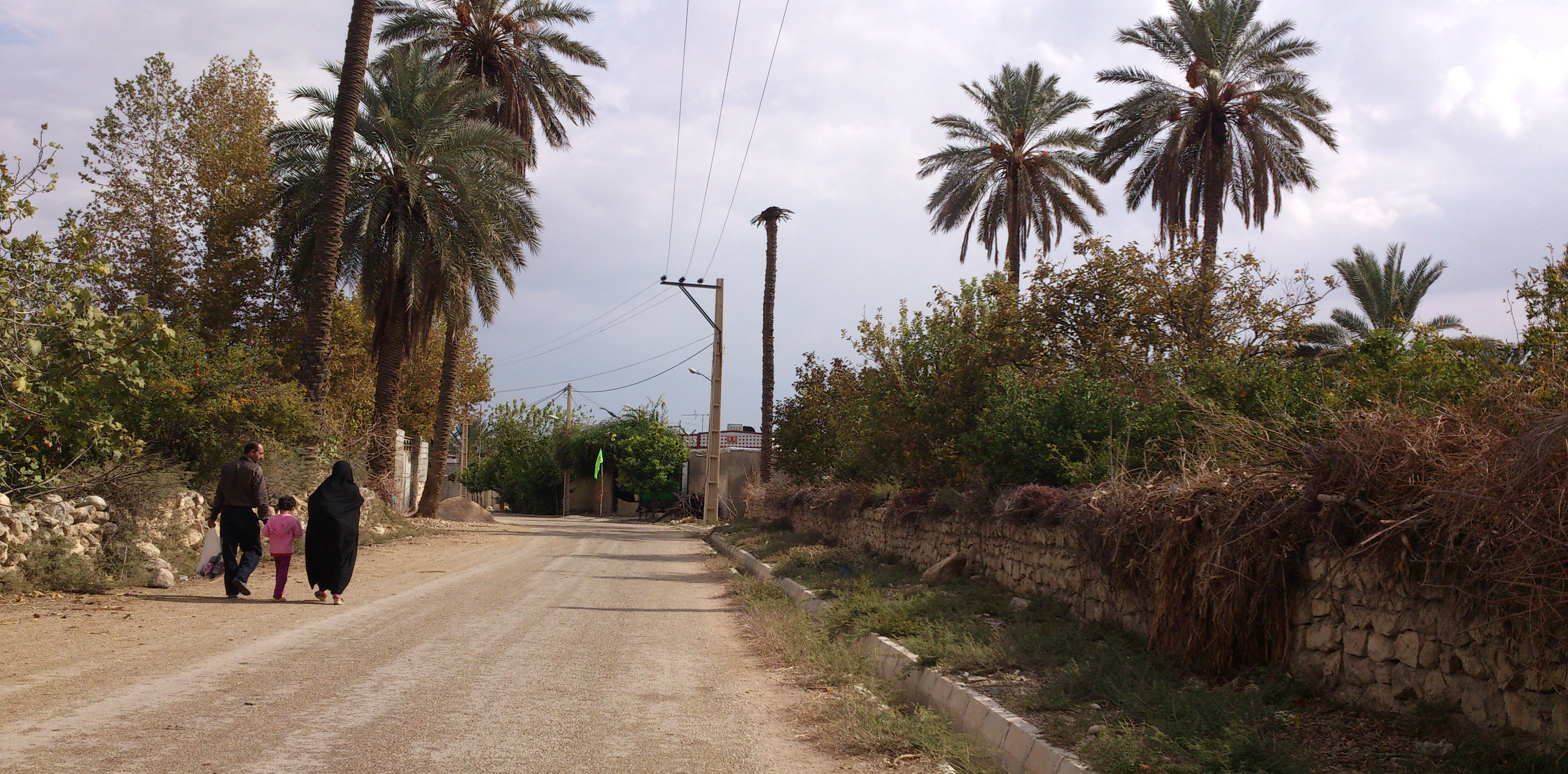
- Landscape in the city of Duzeh

- Location within Iran
- Coordinates: 28°42′05″N 52°57′14″E
- Country: Iran
- Province: Fars
- County: Jahrom
- District: Simakan

Population (2016)
  - Total: 1,348
- Time zone: UTC+3:30 (IRST)

Duzeh (Persian: دوزه) (Note: Also romanized as Dūzeh; also known as Āb Dūzūyeh and Dūzeh-ye Vahmandeh) is a city in, and the capital of, Simakan District of Jahrom County, Fars province, Iran. It also serves as the administrative center for Pol Beh Bala Rural District.

== Demographics ==
=== Population ===
At the time of the 2006 National Census, Duzeh's population was 790 in 178 households, when it was a village in Pol Beh Bala Rural District. The following census in 2011 counted 887 people in 243 households, by which time the village had been elevated to the status of a city. The 2016 census measured the population of the city as 1,348 people in 410 households.
