= Mubarak Shah II =

Sultan of Delhi from 1421 to 1434

Mubarak Shah
- Muizz-ud-Din
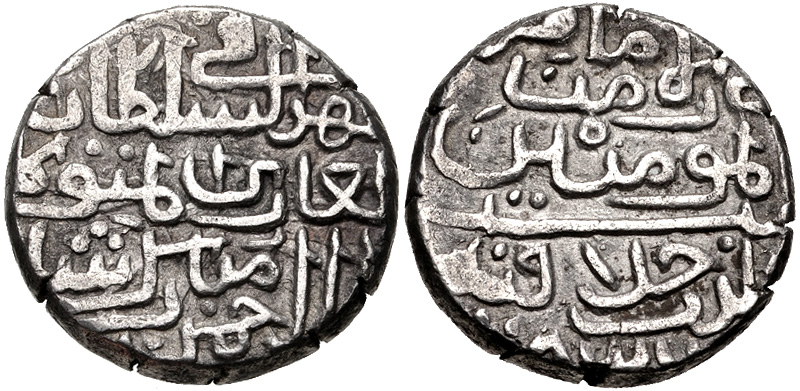
- Coin of Mubarak Shah

Sultan of Delhi
- Reign: 21 May 1421 – 19 February 1434
- Coronation: 1421
- Predecessor: Khizr Khan
- Successor: Muhammad Shah
- Under the nominal suzerainty of: Shah Rukh
- Born: 1378
- Died: 19 February 1434 (aged 55–56)
- House: Sayyid dynasty
- Father: Sayyid Khizr Khan
- Religion: Islam

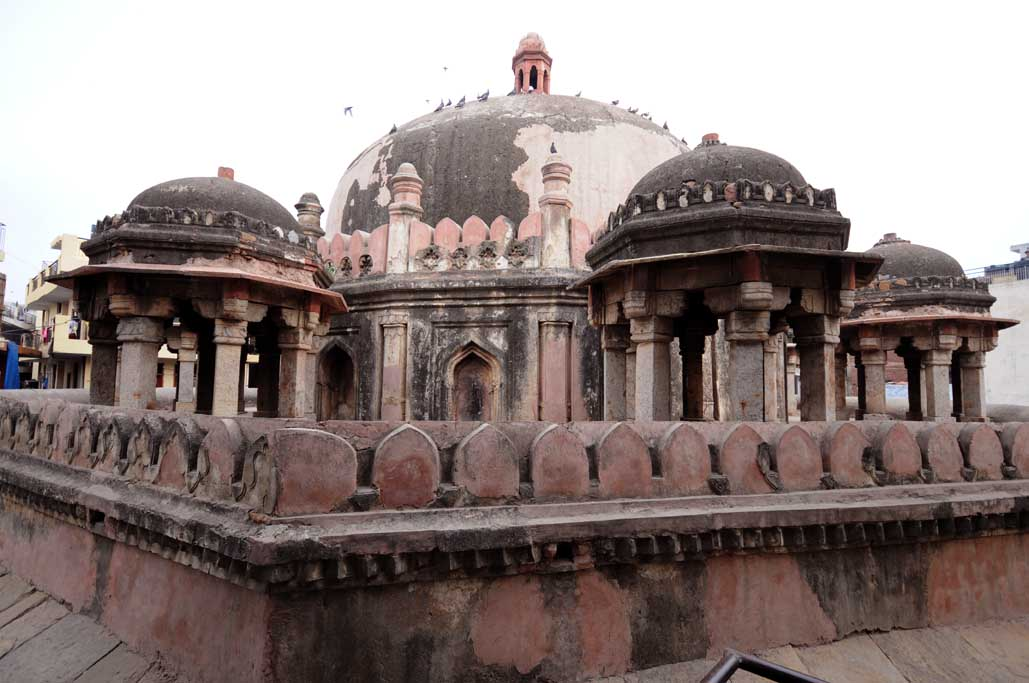
Mubarak Shah's tomb in Kotla Mubarakpur.

Muizuddin Muhammad Mubarak Shah II (Persian: معز الدین محمد مبارک شاه, born Mubarak Khan; Persian: معز الدین محمد مبارک خان; 1378 – 19 February 1434) was the Sultan of Delhi from 1421 to 1434 and the second monarch of the Sayyid dynasty which ruled the Delhi Sultanate. He was the son of Khizr Khan.

== Life ==
He succeeded his father, Khizr Khan to the throne in 1421. Born "Mubarak Khan", he took up the regnal name of Muizz-ud-Din Mubarak Shah or simply Mubarak Shah. The Sayyids were subservient to Timur's successor, Shah Rukh, and while Khizr Khan did not assume the title of sultan, Mubarak Shah was acknowledged as one and However, it is also known that Mubarak Shah received a robe and a chatr (a ceremonial parasol) from the Timurid capital of Herat which indicates that the fealty continued in his time.

During his reign, Mubarak Shah had to deal with the rise of local dynasties in the aftermath of the Timurid invasion of India. However, the biggest threat to his power was that of Jasrat Khokhar, a Punjabi Muslim Khokhar chieftain from Punjab who had conquered vast territories from the Delhi sultanate and even aimed for Delhi in 1431. However, Jasrat Khokhar retreated once Mubarak Shah marched with a large army against him. Two years after this great victory, however, Mubarak Shah was murdered in 1434 and succeeded by his nephew, Muhammad Shah.

== See also ==
- Kotla Mubarakpur
