= Kashkak =

Kashkak or Keshkak or Keshgak or Keshkag (Persian: كشكك) may refer to:

- Keşkek, meat stew
- Keshkak, Golestan, Iran
- Kashkak, Lorestan, Iran
- Kashkak, Mazandaran, Iran
- Kashkak, Razavi Khorasan, Iran

== See also ==
- Kushkak (disambiguation)
