= Kushk-e Sar Tang =

Kushk-e Sar Tang كوشك سرتنگ
- Village
- Location within Iran
- Coordinates: 28°45′03″N 52°51′02″E
- Country: Iran
- Province: Fars
- County: Jahrom
- Bakhsh: Simakan
- Rural District: Pol Beh Bala

Population (2006)
  - Total: 813
- Time zone: UTC+3:30 (IRST)
  - Summer (DST): UTC+4:30 (IRDT)

Kushk-e Sar Tang (Persian: كوشك سرتنگ, also Romanized as Kūshk-e Sar Tang and Kūshk-i-Sartang; also known as Amīr Sālār-e Sar Tang and Kūshk) is a village in Pol Beh Bala Rural District, Simakan District, Jahrom County, Fars province, Iran. At the 2006 census, its population was 813, in 169 families.
