= Kakan Rajputs =

Rajput clan found primarily in India

Kakan is a Rajput clan found primarily in India. They are primarily found in the states of Uttar Pradesh and Bihar and are believed to have migrated from the Kekeya region, located in modern-day Pakistan. Kakan Rajputs predominantly belong to the Bhargav and Bhardwaj gotras, with Maa Durga as their Kuldevi. Kakan Rajputs of Azamgarh trace their origins to Raghuvanshi Kshatriyas, and claim to have defeated the Suris and expelled the aboriginal Bhars from their region.

== Kakan (clan) ==
The Kakan Rajputs are a branch of the Suryavanshi (Solar Dynasty) Rajputs. They trace their lineage back to King Dasharatha's second queen Kaikeyi the mother of Bharat, mentioned in the Ramayana. Kakan Rajputs identify themselves as descendants of the Queen Kaikeyi through Bharat, thus establishing their connection with the Suryavanshi lineage.

== Origin and history ==
Kakan Rajputs originally hailed from the Kekeya kingdom, named after the Kekeya dynasty, to which Queen Kaikeyi belonged. This region holds significant importance in their identity, as some members of the clan also use the term Kaikeya, which is derived from the word Kekeya. However, there is a myth that Kakan Rajputs are descendants of the Kekeya dynasty, which is incorrect. Historically, the Kekeya dynasty belonged to the Chandravanshi (Lunar Dynasty), while the Kakan Rajputs were part of the Suryavanshi (Solar Dynasty). Though they named their clan after the kingdom, they are not related to the Kekeya dynasty, but are descendants of the Prince Bharat (as Bharata's sons later conquered the regions of Gandhara and Kekeya). Kakan Rajputs originally migrated from the Kekeya kingdom (this led to the term Kaikeya being associated with them, as they originally hailed from that region) to Sapta Konkan, where they ruled and served under the Solanki Rajputs. Over time, they settled in northern India, particularly in Uttar Pradesh (Azamgarh, Mau, Ballia, Ghazipur) and parts of Bihar, where they established their rule. Their migration was part of a larger movement where Rajput clans spread across different regions.

Historically, a branch of Kakan Rajputs served as the military commanders and soldiers of the Haldi estate. According to Eastern India by Martin Montgomery, a branch of Kakan rajputs hailed from Mahishmati on the banks of the Narmada River. They first moved to Ratanpur (in present-day Madhya Pradesh), followed by Prayagraj (Jhunsi) with Raja Chandrajyoti Dev, before settling in regions like Manjhi, Bharsar, and Haldi in Ballia district, Uttar Pradesh.

In the battle fought between the Haihaya and Kalachuri Kshatriyas at Vaina and Rasra villages, the Kakan Rajputs played a crucial role in securing victory for the Haihaya ruler of Haldi. As recognition for their bravery and leadership, 14 commanders from the Kakan Rajput clan were awarded the title of Kunwar by the king of Haldi. Many Kakan Rajputs still use the title of kunwar before and after their names.

Today, Kakan Rajputs are found in significant numbers in villages such as Haldi and Parasia. One of their ancestors, known as Hemnath Baba who was a hindu spiritual guru from aghor sampradaya, has a memorial in Kapoorpah Hansnagar. This memorial is located on a 450-bigha land where, according to local tradition, no one sits on a chair or cot in his honor.

=== Kakans of Mau and Ghazipur ===
The Kakan Rajputs first arrived in the Aldemau-Sarauda region of modern-day Mau district in eastern Uttar Pradesh. According to local folklore, their ancestor, Baba Laukamdev, was sent by a king to protect the tomb of a Baba in the village of Rasulpur, near the ancient town of Chirayakot. At the time, the region was ruled by an oppressive Chandravanshi ruler, Raja Chirkut Singh, from whom the town of Chiraiyakot derives its name. Baba Laukamdev defeated Chirkut Singh in battle, who then became a vassal under his authority. Baba Laukamdev established dominance over the region, founding his capital in Aldemau and ruling over 82 villages, with Sarauda Fort as a key settlement. His sons, Arjundev and Ratan Dev, played crucial roles in expanding Kakan rule in the area.

Raja Arjundev, also known as Shravandev, succeeded Laukamdev and named Sarauda (later known as Sarauda Phatak) after himself. Arjundev’s descendants, including his three sons—Raja Singh, Bhisham Singh, and Lakshmisen—continued to rule and expand their influence in the region. Lakshmisen was made the ruler of Sarauda, while Bhisham Singh was granted additional villages, and Raja Singh was given an advisory role due to his limited capability.

Raja Ratan Dev, the younger son of Laukamdev, was more inclined toward Hindu spirituality. He became known as Khadag Baba due to his habit of carrying a sword, and he frequently traveled through dense forests to bathe in the Ganges near Ghazipur. Local legend tells of Ratan Dev killing a tiger on one of his journeys, earning the respect of the local Yaduvanshi (Chandel) king, who eventually offered him their daughter in marriage. Ratan Dev’s descendants settled in Kharabadeeh and established control over 42 villages. Kharabadeeh is also the site where Raja Ratan Dev Singh's fort once stood (now in ruins). All the Rajputs of Kakan/Kaikeya descent in this area are his descendants. A Mata Durga temple now stands in place of the fort.

=== Jauhar of Kakan Kshatranis ===
According to oral tradition, the women of the Kakan royal family (Rajvansh) were as brave as the men. Their courage and sacrifice are evident from the remains of female skeletons discovered in a well in Aldemau-Sarauda. It is said that when the men of the Aldemau-Sarauda royal family left for battle, British invaders sought to dishonor the women in their absence. In response, 52 fearless Kakan Kshatriya women of the Rajvansh fought back against the attackers. However, upon realizing their imminent defeat, they collectively jumped into a well, committing Jauhar to protect their honor. Their sacrifice became a symbol of unwavering courage, but it also dealt a heavy blow to the Aldemau-Sarauda Rajvansh, as the loss of their women left the royal men shattered, unable to restore their former strength and legacy. Today, Kakans of Aldemau-Sarauda and Ghazipur are recognized for their historical land ownership and influence. Many Kakans who migrated from Uttar Pradesh to Bihar became landowners and zamindars especially in regions like Bhojpur, Saran and Shahabad. There, they served as vassals (military commanders) for the Ujjainiya Rajputs and even fought alongside Babu Veer Kunwar Singh during the 1857 revolt against Britishers. They continue to maintain a prominent socio-economic and political presence and influence in both Uttar Pradesh and Bihar.
