= Jarmosht-e Bala =

Village in Fars province, Iran

Jarmosht-e Bala Persian: جرمشت بالا
- Village
- Location within Iran
- Coordinates: 28°44′34″N 53°04′15″E
- Country: Iran
- Province: Fars
- County: Jahrom
- District: Simakan
- Rural District: Posht Par

Population (2016)
  - Total: 626
- Time zone: UTC+3:30 (IRST)

Jarmosht-e Bala (Persian: جرمشت بالا,) (Note: Also romanized as Jarmosht-e Bālā) is a village in, and the capital of, Posht Par Rural District of Simakan District, Jahrom County, Fars province, Iran.

== Demographics ==
=== Population ===
At the time of the 2006 National Census, the village's population was 634 in 160 households. The following census in 2011 counted 615 people in 175 households. The 2016 census measured the population of the village as 626 people in 194 households.
