= Kushk-e Amir ol Momeyin =

Kushk-e Amir ol Momeyin كوشك اميرالموميئن
- Village
- Location within Iran
- Coordinates: 30°39′32″N 50°28′52″E
- Country: Iran
- Province: Kohgiluyeh and Boyer-Ahmad
- County: Kohgiluyeh
- Bakhsh: Central
- Rural District: Dehdasht-e Gharbi

Population (2006)
  - Total: 97
- Time zone: UTC+3:30 (IRST)
  - Summer (DST): UTC+4:30 (IRDT)

Kushk-e Amir ol Momeyin (Persian: كوشك اميرالموميئن, also Romanized as Kūshk-e Amīr ol Momeyīn; also known as Kūshk) is a village in Dehdasht-e Gharbi Rural District, in the Central District of Kohgiluyeh County, Kohgiluyeh and Boyer-Ahmad Province, Iran. At the 2006 census, its population was 97, in 20 families.
