= Keradeh, Khafr =

Keradeh كراده
- Village
- Location within Iran
- Coordinates: 28°58′15″N 53°09′06″E
- Country: Iran
- Province: Fars
- County: Khafr
- Bakhsh: Central
- Rural District: Aliabad

Population (2016)
  - Total: 633
- Time zone: UTC+3:30 (IRST)

Keradeh (Persian: كراده, also Romanized as Kerādeh and Karādeh; also known as Kasrā Deh) is a village in Aliabad Rural District of Khafr County, Fars province, Iran.

At the 2006 census, its population was 897, in 247 families, when it was in Khafr District, Jahrom County. The 2016 census measured the population of the village as 633 people in 225 households.

In 2019, the district was separated from the county in the establishment of Khafr County, and the rural district was transferred to the new Central District.
