= Kushk-e Mohammadabad =

Kushk-e Mohammadabad كوشكمحمداباد
- Village
- Location within Iran
- Coordinates: 30°04′20″N 52°23′33″E
- Country: Iran
- Province: Fars
- County: Sepidan
- Bakhsh: Beyza
- Rural District: Banesh

Population (2006)
  - Total: 292
- Time zone: UTC+3:30 (IRST)
  - Summer (DST): UTC+4:30 (IRDT)

Kushk-e Mohammadabad (Persian: كوشكمحمداباد, also Romanized as Kūshk-e Moḩammadābād; also known as Kūshk-e Ḩājjī Gholūm) is a village in Banesh Rural District, Beyza District, Sepidan County, Fars province, Iran. At the 2006 census, its population was 292, in 73 families.
