= Kushak =

- Village
- Location in Haryana Kushak (India)
- Coordinates: 28.034376°N 77.4795878°E
- Country: India
- State: Haryana
- Region of Haryana: Palwal, Haryana
- District: Palwal
- Tehsil: Palwal
- Gram Panchayat: Kushak

Government
  - Type: Panchayat Raj
  - Body: Gram Panchayat

Area
  - Village: 14 km^{2} (5.4 sq mi)
- Elevation: 10 m (33 ft)

Population (2011)
  - Village: 25,487
  - Village density: 1,800/km^{2} (4,700/sq mi)

Languages
  - Official: Gujari, Hindi
- Time zone: UTC+5:30 (IST)
- PIN: 121107
- Area code: 111
- Literacy: 80%
- Lok Sabha Constituency: Faridabad

Kushak is also called Bainsla village and the largest village in the Palwal district of the Haryana state in India. The Kushak Village settlement in 1095 from Gulda Rajashtna, Bharat As of the 2011 census, the village had a population of 25487 people. Kushak village sits on the bank of the Yamuna river about 40 miles south-east of the Indian capital New Delhi. It is the largest village of the Bainslat tribe.

== Demography ==
Kushak villagers, called Bainsle, are the founder of all Bainsla villages in NCR. Kushak village a famous of Kushak - Badoli (bainslat). The village had a population of 5,487 at the time of 2011.

Particulars	Total	Male	Female
Total No. of Houses	1130	—	—
Population	25,487	13,017	12,470
Literacy	74.36%	76.76%	50.24%

== Geography ==
Village is located at on the east bank of Yamuna river, which is 14 kilometres (8.7 mi) distant.

State code	06
District code	22
Tahsil code	00762
Gram Panchayat Code:	78175

== Education ==
 In Village Kushak have Four Govt school and Institute:-
1.  Govt Sr Sec school - village Kushak near Nahar. Time of British. Its very old school in Gurugram District (Punjab State), later Faridabad District and now Palwal 
District 
2. Govt primary school- village Kushak near 33 Foot road,
3. Govt girls primary school - village Kushak near govt ITI.
4. Govt Industrial Trading Institute - Village Kushak near Baba Gujjar Chowk.

In village Kushak there are three private schools:-
1. DNB ( Dada Nannu Bainsla) public sr sec school - village Kushak near Govt ITI. ( biggest school approximately 1500 student) 
2. NSV public School - village Kushak near Baba Gujjar Chowk
3. Javoha public school - village Kushak near Gujjar Mandir

== Transport ==
 Kushak village connecting with all nearest city as like District Palwal, Sub Tehsil Hassanpur, Block Badoli, National Capital Delhi, all time Kushak village have Good Facility of transport.
