= Kushkak, Sepidan =

Kushkak كوشكك
- Village
- Location within Iran
- Coordinates: 30°10′49″N 52°01′37″E
- Country: Iran
- Province: Fars
- County: Sepidan
- Bakhsh: Hamaijan
- Rural District: Shesh Pir

Population (2006)
  - Total: 194
- Time zone: UTC+3:30 (IRST)
  - Summer (DST): UTC+4:30 (IRDT)

Kushkak (Persian: كوشكك, also Romanized as Kūshkak) is a village in Shesh Pir Rural District, Hamaijan District, Sepidan County, Fars province, Iran. At the 2006 census, its population was 194, in 45 families.
