= Kakan, Afghanistan =

Kakan Kākān
- Location in Afghanistan
- Coordinates: 37°12′56″N 70°20′35″E
- Country: Afghanistan
- Province: Badakhshan Province
- District: Argo
- Time zone: + 4.30

Kakan is a village in Badakhshan Province in north-eastern Afghanistan. It lies on the northern part of the Kokcha River, roughly 25 miles northeast of Fayzabad.
