= Kushk, South Khorasan =

Kushk كوشك
- Village
- Location within Iran
- Coordinates: 33°03′22″N 59°20′31″E
- Country: Iran
- Province: South Khorasan
- County: Birjand
- Bakhsh: Central
- Rural District: Alqurat

Population (2006)
  - Total: 71
- Time zone: UTC+3:30 (IRST)
  - Summer (DST): UTC+4:30 (IRDT)

Kushk (Persian: كوشك, also Romanized as Kūshk; also known as Kūshkābād) is a village in Alqurat Rural District, in the Central District of Birjand County, South Khorasan Province, Iran. At the 2006 census, its population was 71, in 22 families.
