= Kushk-e Khalil =

Kushk-e Khalil كوشكخليل
- Village
- Location within Iran
- Coordinates: 29°23′03″N 52°38′26″E
- Country: Iran
- Province: Fars
- County: Shiraz
- Bakhsh: Central
- Rural District: Bid Zard

Population (2006)
  - Total: 490
- Time zone: UTC+3:30 (IRST)
  - Summer (DST): UTC+4:30 (IRDT)

Kushk-e Khalil (Persian: كوشكخليل, also Romanized as Kūshk-e Khalīl and Kūshk-i-Khalīl) is a village in Bid Zard Rural District, in the Central District of Shiraz County, Fars province, Iran. At the 2006 census, its population was 490, in 131 families.
