= Kushk-e Baqeri =

Kushk-e Baqeri کوشک باقری
- Village
- Location within Iran
- Coordinates: 29°24′17″N 52°00′00″E
- Country: Iran
- Province: Fars
- County: Kazerun
- Bakhsh: Jereh and Baladeh
- Rural District: Famur

Population (2006)
  - Total: 198
- Time zone: UTC+3:30 (IRST)
  - Summer (DST): UTC+4:30 (IRDT)

Kushk-e Baqeri (Persian: کوشک باقری, also Romanized as Kūshk-e Bāqerī) is a village in Famur Rural District, Jereh and Baladeh District, Kazerun County, Fars province, Iran. At the 2006 census, its population was 198, in 36 families.
