= Kushk-e Ghandi =

Kushk-e Ghandi كوشك غندي
- Village
- Location within Iran
- Coordinates: 31°09′34″N 50°28′15″E
- Country: Iran
- Province: Kohgiluyeh and Boyer-Ahmad
- County: Kohgiluyeh
- Bakhsh: Charusa
- Rural District: Tayebi-ye Sarhadi-ye Sharqi

Population (2006)
  - Total: 62
- Time zone: UTC+3:30 (IRST)
  - Summer (DST): UTC+4:30 (IRDT)

Kushk-e Ghandi (Persian: كوشك غندي, also Romanized as Kūshk-e Ghandī; also known as Kooshk Tayyebi Sarhadi, Kūchak, and Kūshk) is a village in Tayebi-ye Sarhadi-ye Sharqi Rural District, Charusa District, Kohgiluyeh County, Kohgiluyeh and Boyer-Ahmad Province, Iran. At the 2006 census, its population was 62, in 13 families.
