= Kushk-e Mowla =

Kushk-e Mowla كوشك مولا
- Village
- Location within Iran
- Coordinates: 29°34′38″N 52°53′50″E
- Country: Iran
- Province: Fars
- County: Shiraz
- Bakhsh: Central
- Rural District: Darian

Population (2006)
  - Total: 930
- Time zone: UTC+3:30 (IRST)
  - Summer (DST): UTC+4:30 (IRDT)

Kushk-e Mowla (Persian: كوشك مولا, also Romanized as Kūshk-e Mowlā and Kushk-i-Maula) is a village in Darian Rural District, in the Central District of Shiraz County, Fars province, Iran. At the 2006 census, its population was 930, in 235 families.
