= Kushkak, Khuzestan =

Kushkak كوشكك
- Village
- Location within Iran
- Coordinates: 32°08′24″N 48°50′06″E
- Country: Iran
- Province: Khuzestan
- County: Gotvand
- Bakhsh: Central
- Rural District: Jannat Makan

Population (2006)
  - Total: 1,042
- Time zone: UTC+3:30 (IRST)
  - Summer (DST): UTC+4:30 (IRDT)

Kushkak (Persian: كوشكك, also Romanized as Kūshkak and Kooshkak; also known as Kuckak and Kūshgak) is a village in Jannat Makan Rural District, in the Central District of Gotvand County, Khuzestan Province, Iran. At the 2006 census, its population was 1,042, in 201 families.
