= Kushk-e Mardan =

Kushk-e Mardan كوشك مردان
- Village
- Location within Iran
- Coordinates: 30°02′57″N 55°05′54″E
- Country: Iran
- Province: Kerman
- County: Shahr-e Babak
- Bakhsh: Central
- Rural District: Estabraq

Population (2006)
  - Total: 32
- Time zone: UTC+3:30 (IRST)
  - Summer (DST): UTC+4:30 (IRDT)

Kushk-e Mardan (Persian: كوشك مردان, also romanized as Kūshk-e Mardān) is a village in Estabraq Rural District, in the Central District of Shahr-e Babak County, Kerman Province, Iran. At the 2006 census, its population was 32, in 10 families.
