= Kushk-e Esmailabad =

Kushk-e Esmailabad كوشك اسماعيل اباد
- Village
- Location within Iran
- Coordinates: 29°00′47″N 52°34′02″E
- Country: Iran
- Province: Fars
- County: Firuzabad
- Bakhsh: Meymand
- Rural District: Khvajehei

Population (2006)
  - Total: 458
- Time zone: UTC+3:30 (IRST)
  - Summer (DST): UTC+4:30 (IRDT)

Kushk-e Esmailabad (Persian: كوشك اسماعيل اباد, also Romanized as Kūshk-e Esmā‘īlābād; also known as Kūshk) is a village in Khvajehei Rural District, Meymand District, Firuzabad County, Fars province, Iran. At the 2006 census, its population was 458, in 104 families.
