= Kushk-e Banian =

Kushk-e Banian كوشك بانيان
- Village
- Location within Iran
- Coordinates: 28°57′34″N 53°39′48″E
- Country: Iran
- Province: Fars
- County: Fasa
- Bakhsh: Central
- Rural District: Kushk-e Qazi

Population (2006)
  - Total: 143
- Time zone: UTC+3:30 (IRST)
  - Summer (DST): UTC+4:30 (IRDT)

Kushk-e Banian (Persian: كوشك بانيان, also Romanized as Kūshk-e Bānīān; also known as Kūshk) is a village in Kushk-e Qazi Rural District, in the Central District of Fasa County, Fars province, Iran. At the 2006 census, its population was 143, in 36 families.
