= Kushk, Marvdasht =

Kushk كوشك
- Village
- Location within Iran
- Coordinates: 29°53′20″N 52°50′43″E
- Country: Iran
- Province: Fars
- County: Marvdasht
- Bakhsh: Central
- Rural District: Kenareh

Population (2006)
  - Total: 3,035
- Time zone: UTC+3:30 (IRST)
  - Summer (DST): UTC+4:30 (IRDT)

Kushk (Persian: كوشك, also Romanized as Kūshk; also known as Kūshk-e Marv Dasht and Kushk Marvdasht) is a village in Kenareh Rural District, in the Central District of Marvdasht County, Fars province, Iran. At the 2006 census, its population was 3,035, in 737 families.
