= Garmosht =

Garmosht گرمشت
- Village
- Location within Iran
- Coordinates: 27°59′57″N 52°44′02″E
- Country: Iran
- Province: Fars
- County: Khonj
- Bakhsh: Mahmeleh
- Rural District: Baghan

Population (2006)
  - Total: 290
- Time zone: UTC+3:30 (IRST)
  - Summer (DST): UTC+4:30 (IRDT)

Garmosht (Persian: گرمشت; also known as Jarmosht) is a village in Baghan Rural District, Mahmeleh District, Khonj County, Fars province, Iran. At the 2006 census, its population was 290, in 62 families.
