= Kushk, Kharameh =

Kushk كوشك
- Village
- Location within Iran
- Coordinates: 29°34′34″N 53°20′21″E
- Country: Iran
- Province: Fars
- County: Kharameh
- Bakhsh: Central
- Rural District: Sofla

Population (2006)
  - Total: 243
- Time zone: UTC+3:30 (IRST)
  - Summer (DST): UTC+4:30 (IRDT)

Kushk (Persian: كوشك, also Romanized as Kūshk; also known as Kooshk Korbal and Kūshk-e Korbāl) is a village in Sofla Rural District, in the Central District of Kharameh County, Fars province, Iran. At the 2006 census, its population was 243, in 63 families.
