= Kushk-e Mur =

Kushk-e Mur كوشك مور
- Village
- Location within Iran
- Coordinates: 28°20′23″N 58°16′11″E
- Country: Iran
- Province: Kerman
- County: Anbarabad
- Bakhsh: Jebalbarez-e Jonubi
- Rural District: Mardehek

Population (2006)
  - Total: 1,175
- Time zone: UTC+3:30 (IRST)
  - Summer (DST): UTC+4:30 (IRDT)

Kushk-e Mur (Persian: كوشك مور, also Romanized as Kūshk-e Mūr and Kūshk Mūr; also known as Kūsh Kūmūr) is a village in Mardehek Rural District, Jebalbarez-e Jonubi District, Anbarabad County, Kerman Province, Iran. At the 2006 census, its population was 1,175, in 258 families.
