= Kushk-e Bidak =

Kushk-e Bidak كوشك بيدك
- Village
- Location within Iran
- Coordinates: 29°25′35″N 52°33′57″E
- Country: Iran
- Province: Fars
- County: Shiraz
- Bakhsh: Central
- Rural District: Qarah Bagh

Population (2006)
  - Total: 3,016
- Time zone: UTC+3:30 (IRST)
  - Summer (DST): UTC+4:30 (IRDT)

Kushk-e Bidak (Persian: كوشك بيدك, also Romanized as Kūshk-e Bīdak and Kūshk Bīdak; also known as Kooshké Bidak and Kūshk-e Bīd, and) is a village in Qarah Bagh Rural District, in the Central District of Shiraz County, Fars province, Iran. At the 2006 census, its population was 3,016, in 770 families.
