= Kushkak, Shiraz =

Kushkak كوشكك
- Village
- Location within Iran
- Coordinates: 29°33′50″N 52°39′31″E
- Country: Iran
- Province: Fars
- County: Shiraz
- Bakhsh: Central
- Rural District: Kaftarak

Population (2006)
  - Total: 2,172
- Time zone: UTC+3:30 (IRST)
  - Summer (DST): UTC+4:30 (IRDT)

Kushkak (Persian: کوشکک, also Romanized as Kūshkak; also known as Kooshkak Hoomeh) is a village in Kaftarak Rural District, in the Central District of Shiraz County, Fars province, Iran. At the 2006 census, its population was 2,172, in 597 families.

== See also ==
- List of cities, towns and villages in Fars province
