= Kushk-e Aqa Jan =

Kushk-e Aqa Jan كوشك اقاجان
- Village
- Location within Iran
- Coordinates: 32°05′58″N 49°34′23″E
- Country: Iran
- Province: Khuzestan
- County: Andika
- Bakhsh: Abezhdan
- Rural District: Kushk

Population (2006)
  - Total: 43
- Time zone: UTC+3:30 (IRST)
  - Summer (DST): UTC+4:30 (IRDT)

Kushk-e Aqa Jan (Persian: كوشك اقاجان, also Romanized as Kūshk-e Āqā Jān and Keveshk-e Āqā Jān) is a village in Kushk Rural District, Abezhdan District, Andika County, Khuzestan Province, Iran. At the 2006 census, its population was 43, made up of 8 families.
