= Kushk-e Borj =

Kushk-e Borj كوشك برج
- Village
- Location within Iran
- Coordinates: 29°16′14″N 56°26′04″E
- Country: Iran
- Province: Kerman
- County: Baft
- Bakhsh: Central
- Rural District: Fathabad

Population (2006)
  - Total: 69
- Time zone: UTC+3:30 (IRST)
  - Summer (DST): UTC+4:30 (IRDT)

Kushk-e Borj (Persian: كوشك برج, also Romanized as Kūshk-e Borj) is a village in Fathabad Rural District, in the Central District of Baft County, Kerman Province, Iran. At the 2006 census, its population was 69, in 14 families.
