= Qasr-e Asem =

Qasr-e Asem قصرعاصم
- Village
- Location within Iran
- Coordinates: 29°03′01″N 52°33′10″E
- Country: Iran
- Province: Fars
- County: Firuzabad
- Bakhsh: Meymand
- Rural District: Khvajehei

Population (2006)
  - Total: 183
- Time zone: UTC+3:30 (IRST)
  - Summer (DST): UTC+4:30 (IRDT)

Qasr-e Asem (Persian: قصرعاصم, also Romanized as Qaşr-e 'Āşem; also known as Ghasr Asem and Kūshk-e Qāsem) is a village in Khvajehei Rural District, Meymand District, Firuzabad County, Fars province, Iran. At the 2006 census, its population was 183, in 51 families.
