= Amir Salar-e Olya =

Amir Salar-e Olya اميرسالارعليا
- Village
- Location within Iran
- Coordinates: 28°54′37″N 52°41′46″E
- Country: Iran
- Province: Fars
- County: Firuzabad
- Bakhsh: Meymand
- Rural District: Par Zeytun

Population (2006)
  - Total: 1,130
- Time zone: UTC+3:30 (IRST)
  - Summer (DST): UTC+4:30 (IRDT)

Amir Salar-e Olya (Persian: اميرسالارعليا, also Romanized as Amīr Sālār-e 'Olyā) is a village in Par Zeytun Rural District, Meymand District, Firuzabad County, Fars province, Iran. At the 2006 census, its population was 1,130, in 202 families.
