= Kushk-e Pas Qalat =

Kushk-e Pas Qalat كوشك پس قلات
- Village
- Country: Iran
- Province: Fars
- County: Kazerun
- Bakhsh: Jereh and Baladeh
- Rural District: Famur

Population (2006)
  - Total: 34
- Time zone: UTC+3:30 (IRST)
  - Summer (DST): UTC+4:30 (IRDT)

Kushk-e Pas Qalat (Persian: كوشك پس قلات, also Romanized as Kūshk-e Pas Qalāt) is a village in Famur Rural District, Jereh and Baladeh District, Kazerun County, Fars province, Iran. At the 2006 census, its population was 34, in 5 families.
