= Kushkak, Afghanistan =

Kushkak
- Location in Afghanistan
- Coordinates: 36°41′55″N 66°54′14″E
- Country: Afghanistan
- Province: Balkh Province
- Time zone: + 4.30

Kushkak is a village in Balkh Province in northern Afghanistan.

== See also ==
- Balkh Province
