= Kushk-e Abul =

Kushk-e Abul كوشك ابول
- Village
- Location within Iran
- Coordinates: 30°54′41″N 50°32′37″E
- Country: Iran
- Province: Kohgiluyeh and Boyer-Ahmad
- County: Kohgiluyeh
- Bakhsh: Central
- Rural District: Rak

Population (2006)
  - Total: 609
- Time zone: UTC+3:30 (IRST)
  - Summer (DST): UTC+4:30 (IRDT)

Kushk-e Abul (Persian: كوشك ابول, also Romanized as Kūshk-e Abūl; also known as Kūshk, Qal‘eh-i-Khushk, Qal‘eh Kūshk, Qal‘eh-ye Khoshk, and Qal‘eh-ye Kūshk) is a village in Rak Rural District, in the Central District of Kohgiluyeh County, Kohgiluyeh and Boyer-Ahmad Province, Iran. As of the 2006 census, its population was 609, with 134 families living in the village.
