= Kushk, Hormozgan =

Kushk كوشك
- Village
- Location within Iran
- Coordinates: 26°53′44″N 55°26′25″E
- Country: Iran
- Province: Hormozgan
- County: Bandar Lengeh
- Bakhsh: Central
- Rural District: Dezhgan

Population (2006)
  - Total: 214
- Time zone: UTC+3:30 (IRST)
  - Summer (DST): UTC+4:30 (IRDT)

Kushk (Persian: كوشك, also Romanized as Kūshk) is a village in Dezhgan Rural District, in the Central District of Bandar Lengeh County, Hormozgan Province, Iran. At the 2006 census, its population was 214, in 46 families.
