= Kushk Talkh-e Darghak =

Kushk Talkh-e Darghak كوشك تلخ درغك
- Village
- Location within Iran
- Coordinates: 31°05′48″N 50°35′13″E
- Country: Iran
- Province: Kohgiluyeh and Boyer-Ahmad
- County: Kohgiluyeh
- Bakhsh: Dishmok
- Rural District: Bahmayi-ye Sarhadi-ye Gharbi

Population (2006)
  - Total: 68
- Time zone: UTC+3:30 (IRST)
  - Summer (DST): UTC+4:30 (IRDT)

Kushk Talkh-e Darghak (Persian: كوشك تلخ درغك, also Romanized as Kūshk Talkh-e Darghak; also known as Kūshk) is a village in Bahmayi-ye Sarhadi-ye Gharbi Rural District, Dishmok District, Kohgiluyeh County, Kohgiluyeh and Boyer-Ahmad Province, Iran. At the 2006 census, its population was 68, in 12 families.
