= Baisla =

Gurjar clan

- Jāti: Gurjar
- Religions: Hinduism, Sikhism,
- Languages: Haryanvi, Punjabi, Marwari, Pahari, and Hindi
- Country: India, Pakistan
- Region: Rajasthan Punjab, Haryana, Himachal Pradesh, Uttar Pradesh, Delhi
- Lineage: Gurjar
- Related groups: Gurjar clans

Baisla or Bainsla is a clan of Gurjar ethnic community. Spelling variations include Bainsle, Baisle, Besle and Bansla.

== Ethnography ==
The Baisla are generally located in the northern Indian states of Rajasthan, Madhya Pradesh, Haryana, Punjab, Himachal Pradesh, Delhi and Uttar Pradesh.

In Meerut district the Baislas held Zamindari over 16 villages
