= Vaina, Uttar Pradesh =

Coordinates: 28°09′N 77°59′E

Vaina is a village and gram panchayat in Khair tehsil of Aligarh district in Uttar Pradesh, India. It borders Gautam Budh Nagar district in the north and west. It is 8 km away from Tappal and 5 km from Jewar.

The village is a very prominent village of the area. It is situated west to Manpur, north to Budhaka, South to Chauroli, East to Alawalpur, south-east to Mangrauli, north-west to Atari villages.

It is 90 km from Delhi and can be reached via Faridabad-Palwal-Jewar or Yamuna Expressway. It is 60 km from Aligarh.

Tehsil Name : Khair

District : Aligarh

State : Uttar Pradesh

Division : Aligarh

Language : Hindi

Time zone: IST (UTC+5:30)

Elevation / Altitude: 201 meters. Above Sea level

Assembly constituency : Khair assembly constituency

Lok Sabha constituency : Aligarh parliamentary constituency

Serpanch Name : Santu (Manager) Pin Code : 202165

Post Office Name : vaina

Sarvodaya Inter College, Akshar deep Inter College and s.p.p school are schools in the village among other ones.

Main occupation of the villagers remain agriculture but dependency on agriculture is contracting continuously. Wheats and rice are two main crops that the village produces. There are 3-4 small canals who irrigate the crops. Villagers now are doing other works like contracts with Jaypee Group, working at Yamuna Expressway, shopkeeping at Jewar and jobs in Delhi/NCR. Connectivity with Delhi/Noida by Yamuna Expressway has eased life of the whole area including Vaina.

Vaina Sahakari Samiti is located in Hamidpur.
