= Kushk-e Olya, Kohgiluyeh and Boyer-Ahmad =

Kushk-e Olya كوشك عليا
- Village
- Location within Iran
- Coordinates: 30°28′09″N 51°29′33″E
- Country: Iran
- Province: Kohgiluyeh and Boyer-Ahmad
- County: Boyer-Ahmad
- Bakhsh: Central
- Rural District: Dasht-e Rum

Population (2006)
  - Total: 600
- Time zone: UTC+3:30 (IRST)
  - Summer (DST): UTC+4:30 (IRDT)

Kushk-e Olya (Persian: كوشك عليا, also romanized as Kūshk-e ‘Olyā; also known as Kawaishk, Keveshk Bālā, Keveshk-e Bālā, Khūīshk, Kūshk, Kūshkak, and Kūshk-e Bālā) is a village in Dasht-e Rum Rural District, in the Central District of Boyer-Ahmad County, Kohgiluyeh and Boyer-Ahmad Province, Iran. At the 2006 census, its population was 600, in 123 families.
