= Kushk-e Sofla, Fars =

Kushk-e Sofla كوشك سفلي
- Village
- Location within Iran
- Coordinates: 30°25′44″N 51°28′05″E
- Country: Iran
- Province: Fars
- County: Rostam
- Bakhsh: Central
- Rural District: Rostam-e Yek

Population (2006)
  - Total: 50
- Time zone: UTC+3:30 (IRST)
  - Summer (DST): UTC+4:30 (IRDT)

Kushk-e Sofla (Persian: كوشك سفلي, also Romanized as Kūshk-e Soflá; also known as Keveshk-e Pā’īn, Keveshk Pā’īn, Kūshk, and Kūshk-e Pā’īn) is a village in Rostam-e Yek Rural District, in the Central District of Rostam County, Fars province, Iran. At the 2006 census, its population was 50, in 11 families.
