= Kushk, Borujerd =

Kushk كوشك
- Village
- Location within Iran
- Coordinates: 33°58′02″N 48°51′08″E
- Country: Iran
- Province: Lorestan
- County: Borujerd
- Bakhsh: Central
- Rural District: Darreh Seydi

Population (2006)
  - Total: 34
- Time zone: UTC+3:30 (IRST)
  - Summer (DST): UTC+4:30 (IRDT)

Kushk (Persian: كوشك, also Romanized as Kūshk; also known as Kushka, Kūshkeh, and Kūshk-e Soflá) is a village in Darreh Seydi Rural District, in the Central District of Borujerd County, Lorestan Province, Iran. At the 2006 census, its population was 34, in 11 families.
