= Kushk-e Sofla, Kerman =

Village in Kerman, Iran

Kushk-e Sofla كوشك سفلي
- Village
- Location within Iran
- Coordinates: 28°41′24″N 56°45′03″E
- Country: Iran
- Province: Kerman
- County: Baft
- Bakhsh: Central
- Rural District: Dashtab

Population (2006)
  - Total: 112
- Time zone: UTC+3:30 (IRST)
  - Summer (DST): UTC+4:30 (IRDT)

Kushk-e Sofla (Persian: كوشك سفلي, also Romanized as Kūshk-e Soflá and Kooshk Soflá; also known as Gūshk-e Pā’īn, Gūshk-e Soflá, Gushk Pāīn, and Kūshk-e Pā’īn) is a village in Dashtab Rural District, in the Central District of Baft County, Kerman Province, Iran. At the 2006 census, its population was 112, in 25 families.
