= Kushk-e Olya, Kerman =

Kushk-e Olya كوشك عليا
- Village
- Location within Iran
- Coordinates: 28°45′24″N 56°45′10″E
- Country: Iran
- Province: Kerman
- County: Baft
- Bakhsh: Central
- Rural District: Dashtab

Population (2006)
  - Total: 392
- Time zone: UTC+3:30 (IRST)
  - Summer (DST): UTC+4:30 (IRDT)

Kushk-e Olya (Persian: كوشك عليا, also Romanized as Kūshk-e ‘Olyā and Kooshk ‘Olya; also known as Gūshk, Gushk Bāla, Kūshk, Kūshk-e Bālā, and Qoshk-e Bālā) is a village in Dashtab Rural District, in the Central District of Baft County, Kerman Province, Iran. At the 2006 census, its population was 392, in 92 families.
