= Pol Beh Bala Rural District =

Rural district in Fars province, Iran

Pol Beh Bala Rural District Persian: دهستان پل به بالا
- Rural District
- Location within Iran
- Coordinates: 28°43′11″N 52°52′13″E
- Country: Iran
- Province: Fars
- County: Jahrom
- District: Simakan
- Capital: Duzeh

Population (2016)
  - Total: 6,033
- Time zone: UTC+3:30 (IRST)

Pol Beh Bala Rural District (Persian: دهستان پل به بالا) is in Simakan District of Jahrom County, Fars province, Iran. It is administered from the city of Duzeh.

== Demographics ==
=== Population ===
At the time of the 2006 National Census, the rural district's population was 6,718 in 1,459 households. There were 5,908 inhabitants in 1,582 households at the following census of 2011. The 2016 census measured the population of the rural district as 6,033 in 1,765 households. The most populous of its 11 villages was Arjuyeh, with 1,741 people.
