= Pol Beh Pain Rural District =

Rural district in Fars province, Iran

Pol Beh Pain Rural District Persian: دهستان پل به پائين
- Rural District
- Location within Iran
- Coordinates: 28°37′17″N 53°04′37″E
- Country: Iran
- Province: Fars
- County: Jahrom
- District: Simakan
- Capital: Shaghun

Population (2016)
  - Total: 5,044
- Time zone: UTC+3:30 (IRST)

Pol Beh Pain Rural District (Persian: دهستان پل به پائين) is in Simakan District of Jahrom County, Fars province, Iran. Its capital is the village of Shaghun.

== Demographics ==
=== Population ===
At the time of the 2006 National Census, the rural district's population was 5,028 in 1,055 households. There were 5,069 inhabitants in 1,255 households at the following census of 2011. The 2016 census measured the population of the rural district as 5,044 in 1,423 households. The most populous of its 19 villages was Shaghun, with 798 people.
