= Posht Par Rural District =

Rural district in Fars province, Iran

Posht Par Rural District Persian: دهستان پشت پر
- Rural District
- Location within Iran
- Coordinates: 28°45′50″N 53°05′16″E
- Country: Iran
- Province: Fars
- County: Jahrom
- District: Simakan
- Capital: Jarmosht-e Bala

Population (2016)
  - Total: 5,135
- Time zone: UTC+3:30 (IRST)

Posht Par Rural District (Persian: دهستان پشت پر) is in Simakan District of Jahrom County, Fars province, Iran. Its capital is the village of Jarmosht-e Bala.

== Demographics ==
=== Population ===
At the time of the 2006 National Census, the rural district's population was 5,227 in 1,267 households. There were 4,791 inhabitants in 1,333 households at the following census of 2011. The 2016 census measured the population of the rural district as 5,135 in 1,585 households. The most populous of its 18 villages was Behjan, with 1,619 people.
