= Simakan District =

District in Fars province, Iran

Simakan District Persian: بخش سیمکان
- District
- Location within Iran
- Coordinates: 28°41′45″N 53°00′30″E
- Country: Iran
- Province: Fars
- County: Jahrom
- Capital: Duzeh

Population (2016)
  - Total: 17,560
- Time zone: UTC+3:30 (IRST)

Simakan District (Persian: بخش سیمکان) is in Jahrom County, Fars province, Iran. Its capital is the city of Duzeh.

== History ==
After the 2006 National Census, the village of Duzeh was elevated to the status of a city.

== Demographics ==
=== Population ===
At the time of the 2006 census, the district's population was 16,973 in 3,781 households. The following census in 2011 counted 16,655 people in 4,413 households. The 2016 census measured the population of the district as 17,560 inhabitants in 5,183 households.

=== Administrative divisions ===
Simakan District Population
Administrative Divisions	2006	2011	2016
Pol Beh Bala RD	6,718	5,908	6,033
Pol Beh Pain RD	5,028	5,069	5,044
Posht Par RD	5,227	4,791	5,135
Duzeh (city)		887	1,348
Total	16,973	16,655	17,560
RD = Rural District
