= Shankarpur, Firozabad =

Village in Uttar Pradesh, India

Shankarpur
- Village
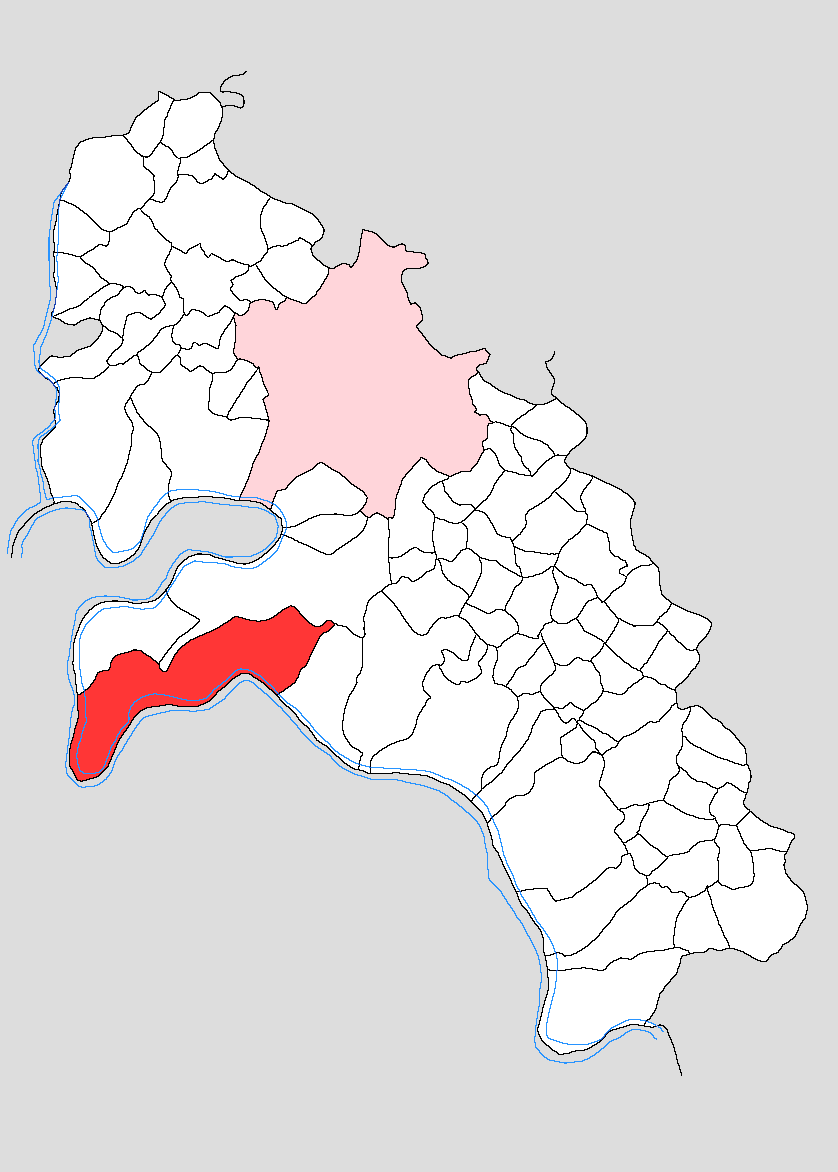
- Map showing Shankarpur in Firozabad block

- Location in Uttar Pradesh, India
- Coordinates: 27.08877°N 78.37143°E
- Country: India
- State: Uttar Pradesh
- District: Firozabad
- Tehsil: Firozabad

Area
  - Total: 13.873 km^{2} (5.356 sq mi)

Population (2011)
  - Total: 4,073
  - Density: 293.6/km^{2} (760.4/sq mi)
- Time zone: UTC+5:30 (IST)

Shankarpur (Śaṃkarpur) is a village in Firozabad block of Firozabad district, Uttar Pradesh. It is located southwest of Firozabad, close to the bank of the Yamuna. As of 2011, it had a population of 4,073, in 666 households.

== Geography ==
Shankarpur is located southwest of Firozabad on the road to Fatehabad, just to the northeast of the bank of the Yamuna. Between Shankarpur and the Yamuna is an area of open babul woodland, part of the Firozabad Reserved Forest. To the northwest is the village of Chandwar, amidst another branch of the forest reserve, while to the southeast is the village of Madua, along with a denser wooded area that is not part of the forest reserve. Areas of farmland surround Shankarpur on the north, northeast, and southeast.

== Demographics ==
As of 2011, Shankarpur had a population of 4,073, in 666 households. This population was 53.4% male (2,177) and 46.6% female (1,896). The 0–6 age group numbered 898 (480 male and 418 female), making up 22.0% of the total population. 47 residents were members of Scheduled Castes, or 1.2% of the total.

The 1981 census recorded Shankarpur as having a population of 2,232 people (1,247 male and 985 female), in 409 households and 399 physical houses.

The 1961 census recorded Shankarpur as comprising 3 hamlets, with a total population of 1,608 people (887 male and 721 female), in 306 households and 232 physical houses. The area of the village was given as 3,437 acres.

== Infrastructure ==
As of 2011, Shankarpur had 1 primary school; it did not have any healthcare facilities. Drinking water was provided by hand pump and tube well/bore well; there were no public toilets. The village did not have a post office or public library; there was at least some access to electricity for all purposes. Streets were made of both kachcha and pakka materials.
