= Fatehpur Kotla =

Village in Uttar Pradesh, India

- Village
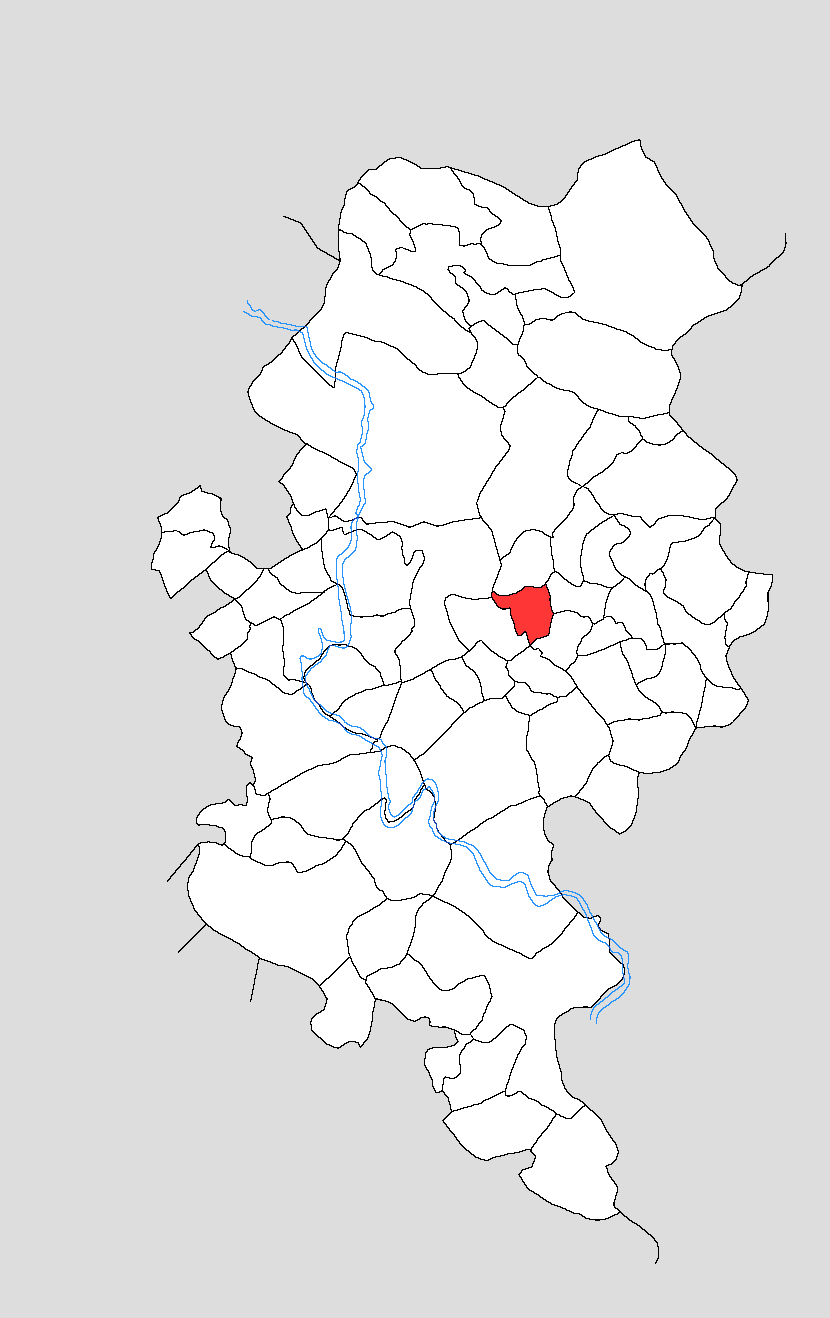
- Map showing Fatehpur Kotla in Kotla block

- Location in Uttar Pradesh, India
- Coordinates: 27.27406°N 78.43089°E
- Country: India
- State: Uttar Pradesh
- District: Firozabad
- Tehsil: Firozabad

Area
  - Total: 1.087 km^{2} (0.420 sq mi)

Population (2011)
  - Total: 1,507
  - Density: 1,386/km^{2} (3,591/sq mi)
- Time zone: UTC+5:30 (IST)
- PIN: 283203

Fatehpur Kotla (Fatehpur Koṭlā) is a village in Kotla block of Firozabad district, Uttar Pradesh. As of 2011, it has a population of 1,507, in 262 households.

== Demographics ==
As of 2011, Fatehpur Kotla had a population of 1,507, in 262 households. This population was 53.9% male (813) and 46.1% female (694). The 0-6 age group numbered 261 (139 male and 122 female), making up 17.3% of the total population. 110 residents were members of Scheduled Castes, or 7.3% of the total.

The 1981 census recorded Fatehpur Kotla as having a population of 751 people (427 male and 324 female), in 115 households and 115 physical houses.

The 1961 census recorded Fatehpur Kotla as comprising 1 hamlet, with a total population of 487 people (251 male and 236 female), in 99 households and 88 physical houses. The area of the village was given as 162 acres.

== Infrastructure ==
As of 2011, Fatehpur Kotla had 1 primary school; it did not have any healthcare facilities. Drinking water was provided by hand pump and tube well/borehole; there were no public toilets. The village did not have a post office or public library; there was at least some access to electricity for all purposes. Streets were made of both kachcha and pakka materials.
