= Latura =

Village in Uttar Pradesh, India

Latura Laturra
- Village
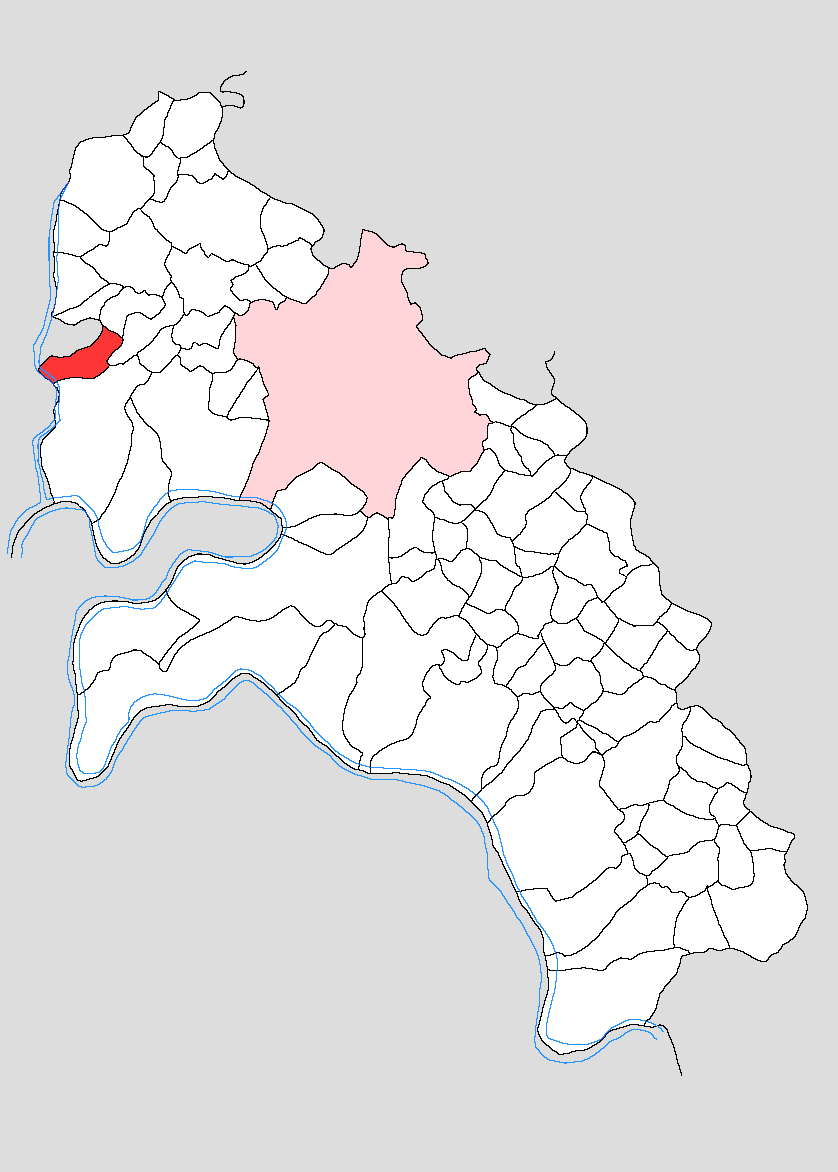
- Map showing Latura in Firozabad block

- Location in Uttar Pradesh, India
- Coordinates: 27.16841°N 78.31882°E
- Country: India
- State: Uttar Pradesh
- District: Firozabad
- Tehsil: Firozabad

Area
  - Total: 1.906 km^{2} (0.736 sq mi)

Population (2011)
  - Total: 1,671
  - Density: 876.7/km^{2} (2,271/sq mi)
- Time zone: UTC+5:30 (IST)
- PIN: 283203

Latura (Laturā), also spelled Laturra, is a village in Firozabad block of Firozabad district, Uttar Pradesh. It is located just northwest of the city. As of 2011, it had a population of 1,671, in 273 households.

== Geography ==
Latura is located to the northwest of Firozabad, less than 1 km south of the main line of the Northern Railway. The village of Khemkaranpur is located about 1 km to the northwest of Latura, by the railway tracks, and the Hirangaon railway station is located in Khemkaranpur. (The village of Hirangaon itself is located farther away to the northeast of the tracks). Less than 1 km to the southeast of Latura is the village of Kurri Kupa, and a bit to the northeast of Kurri Kupa is Daragpur. To the southwest of Latura are the hamlets of Darapur and Mehari, and to the west of them is the Jhirna Nala.

== Demographics ==
As of 2011, Latura had a population of 1,671, in 273 households. This population was 52.2% male (873) and 47.8% female (798). The 0–6 age group numbered 254 (120 male and 134 female), making up 15.2% of the total population. 157 residents were members of Scheduled Castes, or 9.4% of the total.

The 1981 census recorded Latura (as "Laturra" in English, but "लतुरा", Laturā, in Hindi) as having a population of 1,064 people (557 male and 507 female), in 261 households and 261 physical houses.

The 1961 census recorded Latura as comprising 2 hamlets, with a total population of 643 people (335 male and 308 female), in 105 households and 81 physical houses. The area of the village was given as 471 acres and it had a medical practitioner at that point.

== Infrastructure ==
As of 2011, Latura had 1 primary school; it did not have any healthcare facilities. Drinking water was provided by hand pump and tube well/bore well; there were no public toilets. The village did not have a post office or public library; there was at least some access to electricity for all purposes. Streets were made of both kachcha and pakka materials.
