= Usmanpur, Firozabad =

Village in Uttar Pradesh, India

Usmanpur
- Village
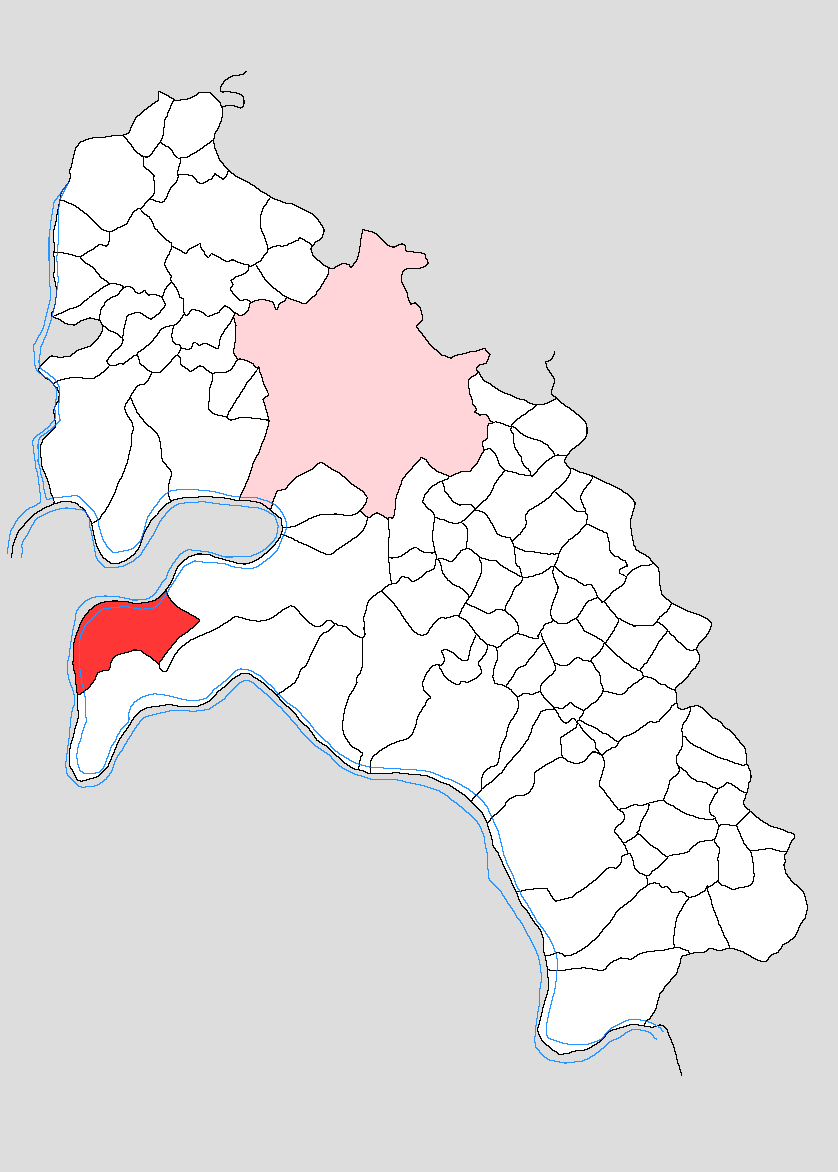
- Map showing Usmanpur in Firozabad block

- Location in Uttar Pradesh, India
- Coordinates: 27.0972°N 78.32181°E
- Country: India
- State: Uttar Pradesh
- District: Firozabad
- Tehsil: Firozabad

Area
  - Total: 5.752 km^{2} (2.221 sq mi)

Population (2011)
  - Total: 2,173
  - Density: 377.8/km^{2} (978.4/sq mi)
- Time zone: UTC+5:30 (IST)

Usmanpur (Usmānpur), also called Karapillu, is a village in Firozabad block of Firozabad district, Uttar Pradesh. It is located southwest of Firozabad, on the bank of the Yamuna. As of 2011, it had a population of 2,173, in 358 households.

== Geography ==
Usmanpur (also called Karapillu) is located on the south bank of a big meander in the Yamuna, southwest of Firozabad. An area of farmland extends southwest of Usmanpur, toward the hamlet of Kabirpur, while there is a large area of open scrubland to the southeast. Immediately to the east of Usmanpur is a patch of babul woodland belonging to the Firozabad Reserved Forest. Beyond this to the northeast is the hamlet of Malipatti, and beyond that is the village of Chandwar.

== Demographics ==
As of 2011, Usmanpur had a population of 2,173, in 358 households. This population was 55.0% male (1,196) and 45.0% female (977). The 0–6 age group numbered 520 (290 male and 230 female), making up 23.9% of the total population. No residents were members of Scheduled Castes.

The 1981 census recorded Usmanpur as having a population of 1,012 people (544 male and 468 female), in 161 households and 161 physical houses.

The 1961 census recorded Usmanpur as comprising 2 hamlets, with a total population of 706 people (387 male and 319 female), in 129 households and 112 physical houses. The area of the village was given as 1,422 acres.

== Infrastructure ==
As of 2011, Usmanpur had 1 primary school; it did not have any healthcare facilities. Drinking water was provided by well, hand pump, and tube well/bore well; there were no public toilets. The village did not have a post office or public library; there was at least some access to electricity for all purposes. Streets were made of pakka materials.
