= Jaganpur, Uttar Pradesh =

Village in Uttar Pradesh, India

Jaganpur
- Village
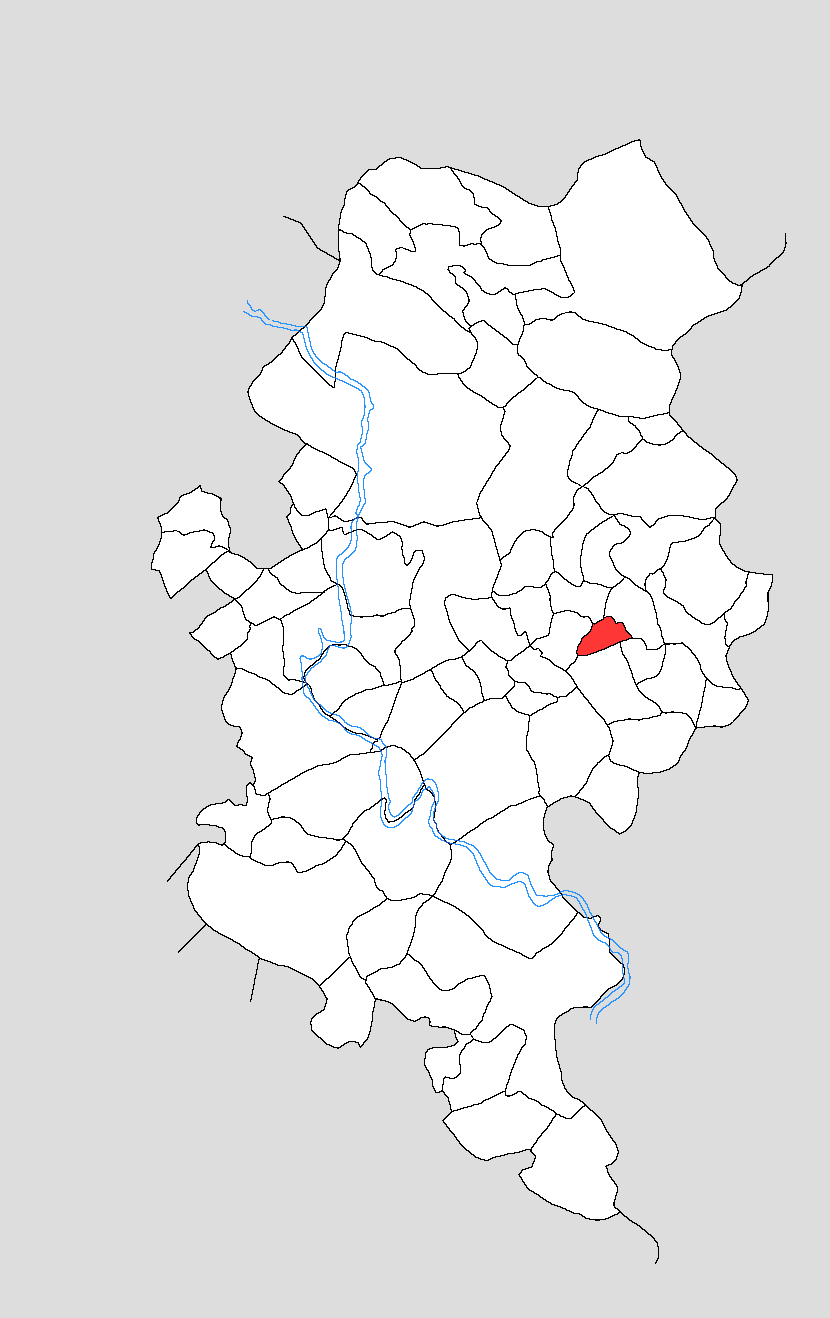
- Map showing Jaganpur in Kotla block

- Location in Uttar Pradesh, India
- Coordinates: 27.27399°N 78.44455°E
- Country: India
- State: Uttar Pradesh
- District: Firozabad
- Tehsil: Firozabad

Area
  - Total: 0.676 km^{2} (0.261 sq mi)

Population (2011)
  - Total: 0
  - Density: 0.0/km^{2} (0.0/sq mi)
- Time zone: UTC+5:30 (IST)

Jaganpur (Jaganpur) is an abandoned village in Kotla block of Firozabad district, Uttar Pradesh. As of 2011, it has a population of 0, although the land remains under human use.

== Demographics ==
The 2011 census recorded Jaganpur with a population of 0, as did the 1981 census.

The 1961 census, however, recorded Jaganpur as being inhabited: it comprised 1 hamlet, with a total population of 182 people (104 male and 78 female), in 32 households and 29 physical houses. The area of the village was given as 162 acres.

== Land use ==
According to the 2011 census, Jaganpur has a total area of 67.6 hectares, of which 64.2 were currently farmland, 2.3 were fallow lands, and 1 was under non-agricultural use. There were no orchards, pastures, or forests on village lands.
