= Nayabans =

Village in Uttar Pradesh, India

- Village
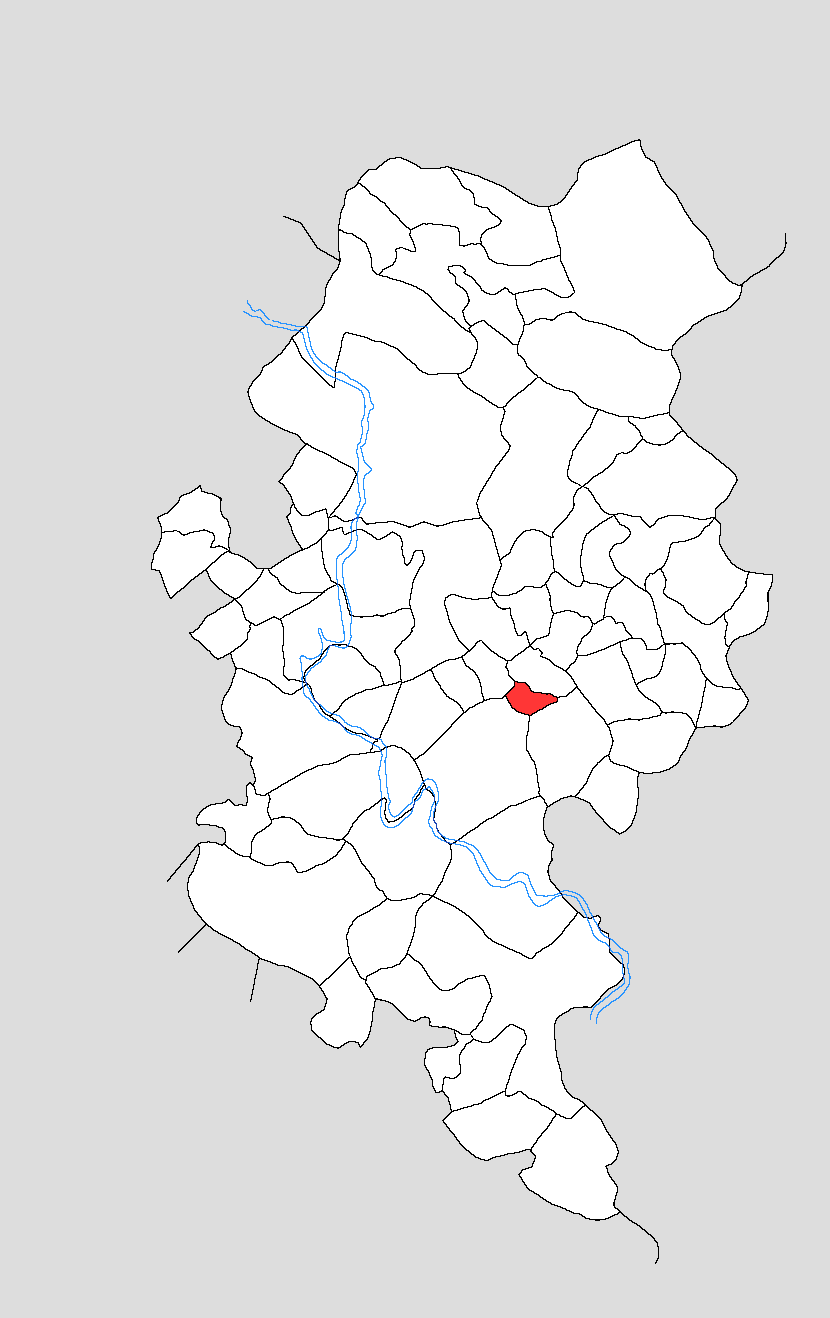
- Map showing Nayabans in Kotla block

- Location in Uttar Pradesh, India
- Coordinates: 27.26001°N 78.42883°E
- Country: India
- State: Uttar Pradesh
- District: Firozabad
- Tehsil: Firozabad

Area
  - Total: 0.556 km^{2} (0.215 sq mi)

Population (2011)
  - Total: 1,417
  - Density: 2,550/km^{2} (6,600/sq mi)
- Time zone: UTC+5:30 (IST)

Nayabans (Nayābans) is a village in Kotla block of Firozabad district, Uttar Pradesh, India. As of 2011, it had a population of 1,417, in 236 households.

== Demographics ==
As of 2011, Nayabans (called "Nayabash" in the 2011 census data) had a population of 1,417, in 236 households. This population was 53.9% male (764) and 46.1% female (653). The 0-6 age group numbered 239 (128 male and 111 female), making up 16.9% of the total population. 47 residents were members of Scheduled Castes, or 3.3% of the total.

The 1981 census recorded Nayabans (as "Naya Bans") as having a population of 718 people (382 male and 336 female), in 123 households and 122 physical houses.

The 1961 census recorded Nayabans (as "Naya Bans") as comprising 1 hamlet, with a total population of 414 people (242 male and 172 female), in 64 households and 60 physical houses. The area of the village was given as 136 acres.

The 1951 census recorded Nayabans as comprising 1 hamlet, with a total population of 359 people (198 male and 161 female), in 58 households and 41 physical houses.

== Infrastructure ==
As of 2011, Nayabans had 3 primary schools; it did not have any healthcare facilities. Drinking water was provided by hand pump and tube well/borehole; there were no public toilets. The village did not have a post office or public library; there was at least some access to electricity for all purposes. Streets were made of both kachcha and pakka materials.
