= Bilahna =

Village in Uttar Pradesh, India

- Village
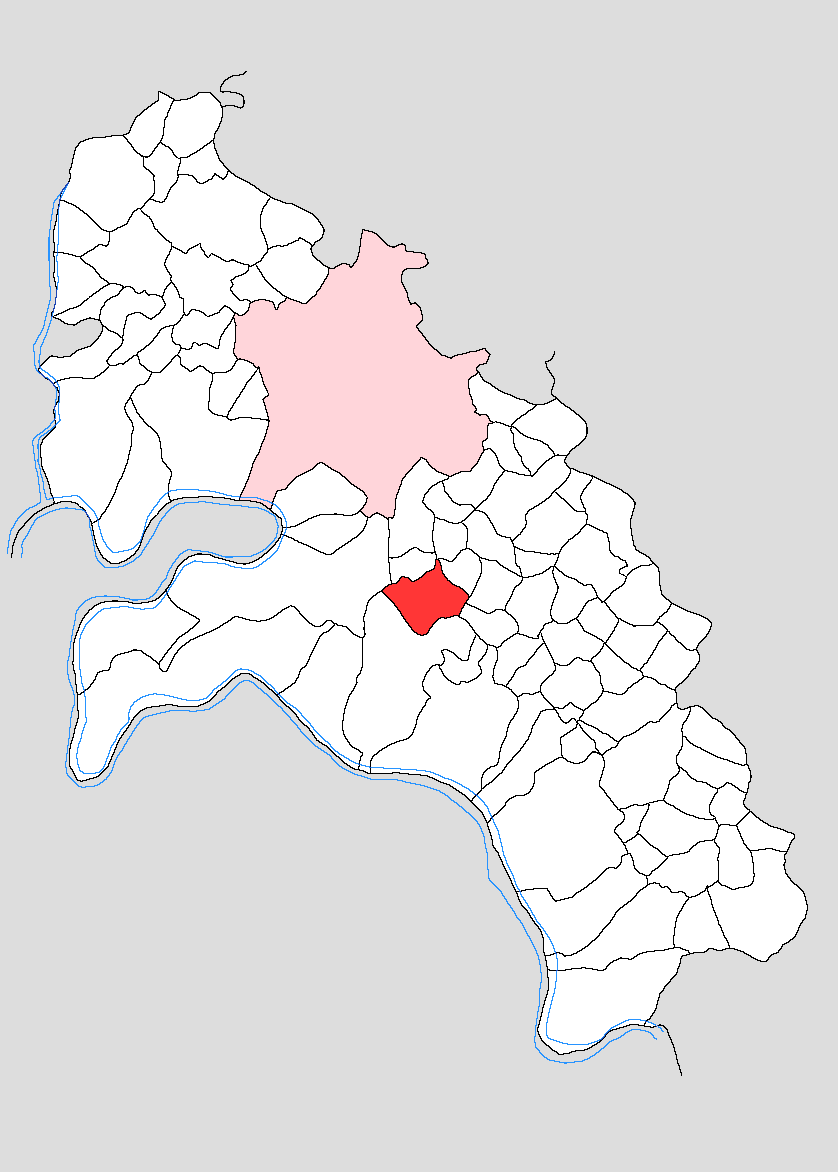
- Map showing Bilahna in Firozabad block

- Location in Uttar Pradesh, India
- Coordinates: 27.1005°N 78.4197°E
- Country: India
- State: Uttar Pradesh
- District: Firozabad
- Tehsil: Firozabad

Area
  - Total: 2.427 km^{2} (0.937 sq mi)

Population (2011)
  - Total: 3,842
  - Density: 1,583/km^{2} (4,100/sq mi)
- Time zone: UTC+5:30 (IST)

Bilahna (Bilahnā) is a village in Firozabad block of Firozabad district, Uttar Pradesh. As of 2011, it had a population of 3,842, in 624 households.

== Geography ==
Bilahna is located southeast of Firozabad; it is connected to the city by a metalled rural road. There is a prominent irrigation tank on the northeast side of the village. The village of Jahangirpur is a short distance to the northeast; Nurpur is to the southeast, and Nasirpur is to the north.

== Demographics ==
As of 2011, Bilahna had a population of 3,842, in 624 households. This population was 53.75% male (2,065) and 46.25% female (1,777). The 0-6 age group numbered 729 (423 male and 306 female), making up 19.0% of the total population. 772 residents were members of Scheduled Castes, or 20.1% of the total.

The 1981 census recorded Bilahna (as "Bilahana") as having a population of 1,521 people (837 male and 684 female), in 304 households and 304 physical houses.

The 1961 census recorded Bilahna as comprising 2 hamlets, with a total population of 1,083 people (572 male and 511 female), in 188 households and 154 physical houses. The area of the village was given as 600 acres and it had a medical practitioner at that point.

== Culture ==
Bilahna holds an annual fair in April.

== Infrastructure ==
As of 2011, Bilahna had 1 primary schools and 1 veterinary hospital but no healthcare facilities for humans. Drinking water was provided by hand pump and tube well/bore well; there were no public toilets. The village had a sub post office but no public library; there was at least some access to electricity for all purposes. Streets were made of both kachcha and pakka materials.
