= Dattpur =

Abandoned village in Uttar Pradesh, India

- Village
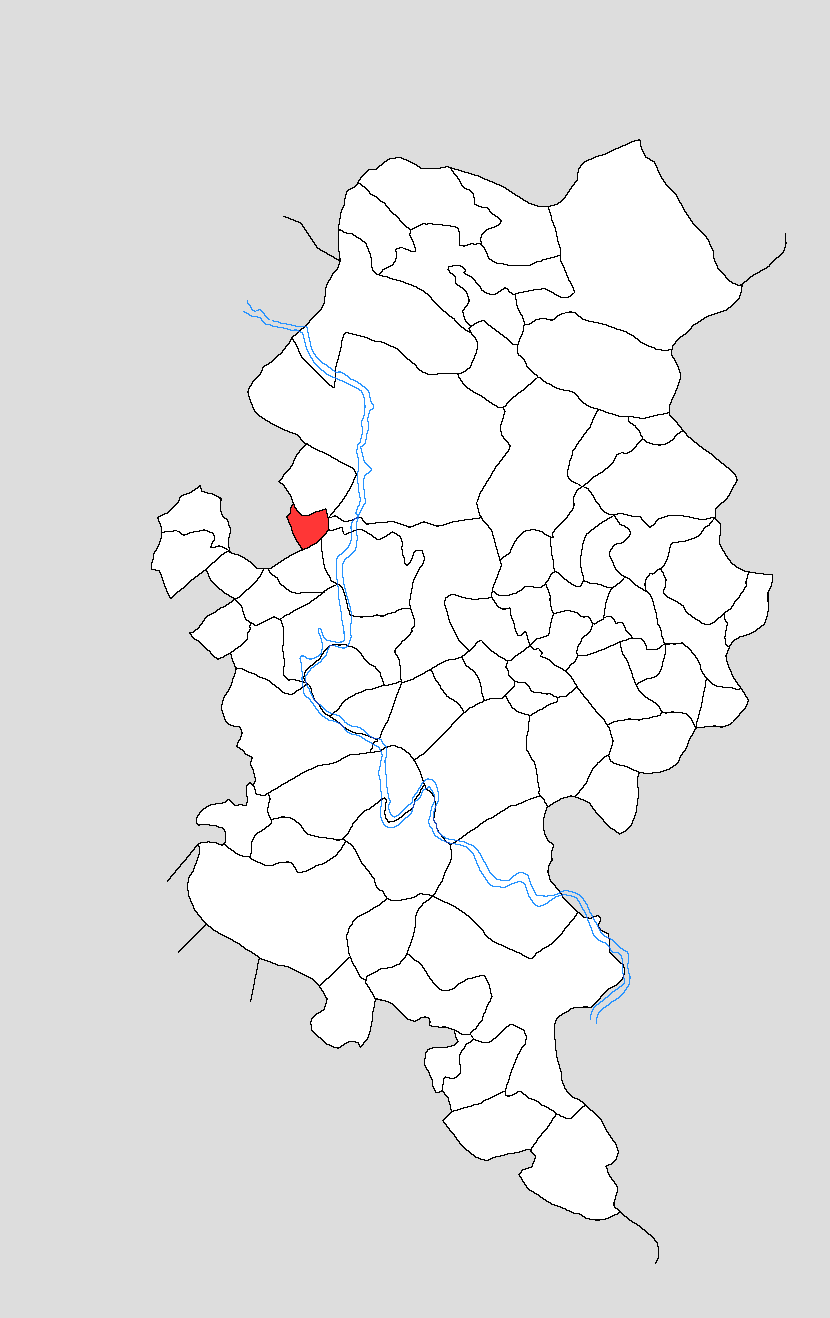
- Map showing Dattpur in Kotla block

- Location in Uttar Pradesh, India
- Coordinates: 27.29463°N 78.37982°E
- Country: India
- State: Uttar Pradesh
- District: Firozabad
- Tehsil: Firozabad

Area
  - Total: 0.574 km^{2} (0.222 sq mi)

Population (2011)
  - Total: 0
  - Density: 0.0/km^{2} (0.0/sq mi)
- Time zone: UTC+5:30 (IST)

Dattpur (Dattpur) is an abandoned village in Kotla block of Firozabad district, Uttar Pradesh, India. As of 2011, it has a population of 0. Its land is still used by humans, mostly for farming.

== Demographics ==
The 2011 census recorded Dattpur with a population of 0, as did the 1981 census and the 1961 census.

The 1951 census, however, recorded Dattpur as inhabited: it was listed as comprising 1 hamlet, with a total population of 36 people (22 male and 14 female), in 3 households and 1 physical house (19 residents were part of institutional or houseless households).

== Land use ==
According to the 2011 census, Dattpur has a total area of 57.4 hectares, of which 32.5 were currently farmland, 21.4 were fallow lands, and 3.4 were under non-agricultural use. There were no orchards, pastures, or forests on village lands.
