= Kolamai =

Village in Uttar Pradesh, India

- Village
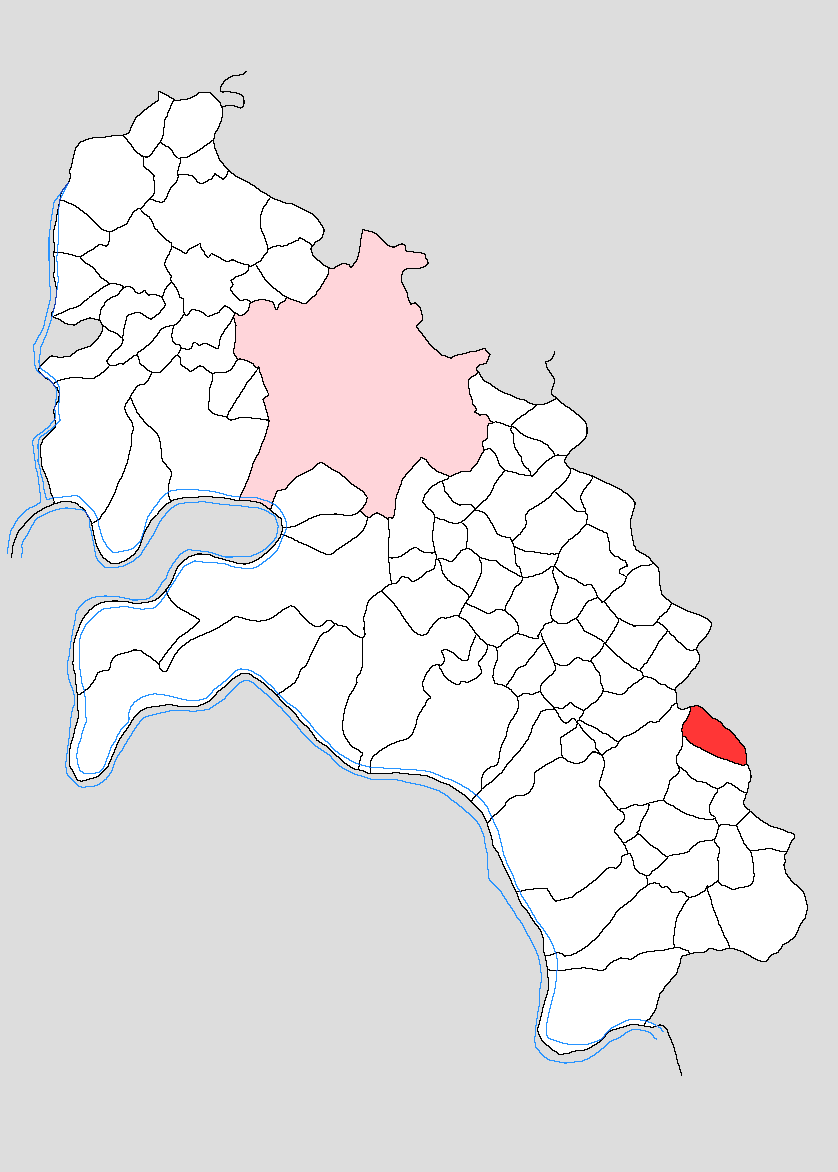
- Map showing Kolamai in Firozabad block

- Location in Uttar Pradesh, India
- Coordinates: 27.06745°N 78.49382°E
- Country: India
- State: Uttar Pradesh
- District: Firozabad
- Tehsil: Firozabad

Area
  - Total: 1.658 km^{2} (0.640 sq mi)

Population (2011)
  - Total: 1,625
  - Density: 980.1/km^{2} (2,538/sq mi)
- Time zone: UTC+5:30 (IST)

Kolamai (Kolāmaī) is a village in Firozabad block of Firozabad district, Uttar Pradesh. It is located southeast of Firozabad, close to the tehsil boundary with Shikohabad. As of 2011, it had a population of 1,625, in 245 households.

== Geography ==
Kolamai is located southeast of Firozabad, close to the tehsil boundary with Shikohabad. The surrounding terrain is basically all level farmland. Nearby villages include Matsena to the northwest, Itora to the southwest, and Jendamai to the south.

== Demographics ==
As of 2011, Kolamai had a population of 1,625, in 245 households. This population was 54.6% male (887) and 45.4% female (738). The 0–6 age group numbered 273 (140 male and 133 female), making up 16.8% of the total population. 489 residents were members of Scheduled Castes, or 30.1% of the total.

The 1981 census recorded Kolamai as having a population of 958 people (502 male and 456 female), in 161 households and 155 physical houses.

The 1961 census recorded Kolamai as comprising 2 hamlets, with a total population of 757 people (396 male and 361 female), in 125 households and 80 physical houses. The area of the village was given as 410 acres.

== Infrastructure ==
As of 2011, Kolamai had 2 primary schools; it did not have any healthcare facilities. Drinking water was provided by tap and hand pump; there were no public toilets. The village did not have a post office or public library; there was at least some access to electricity for all purposes. Streets were made of both kachcha and pakka materials.
