= Nasirpur, Firozabad =

Village in Uttar Pradesh, India

Nasirpur
- Village
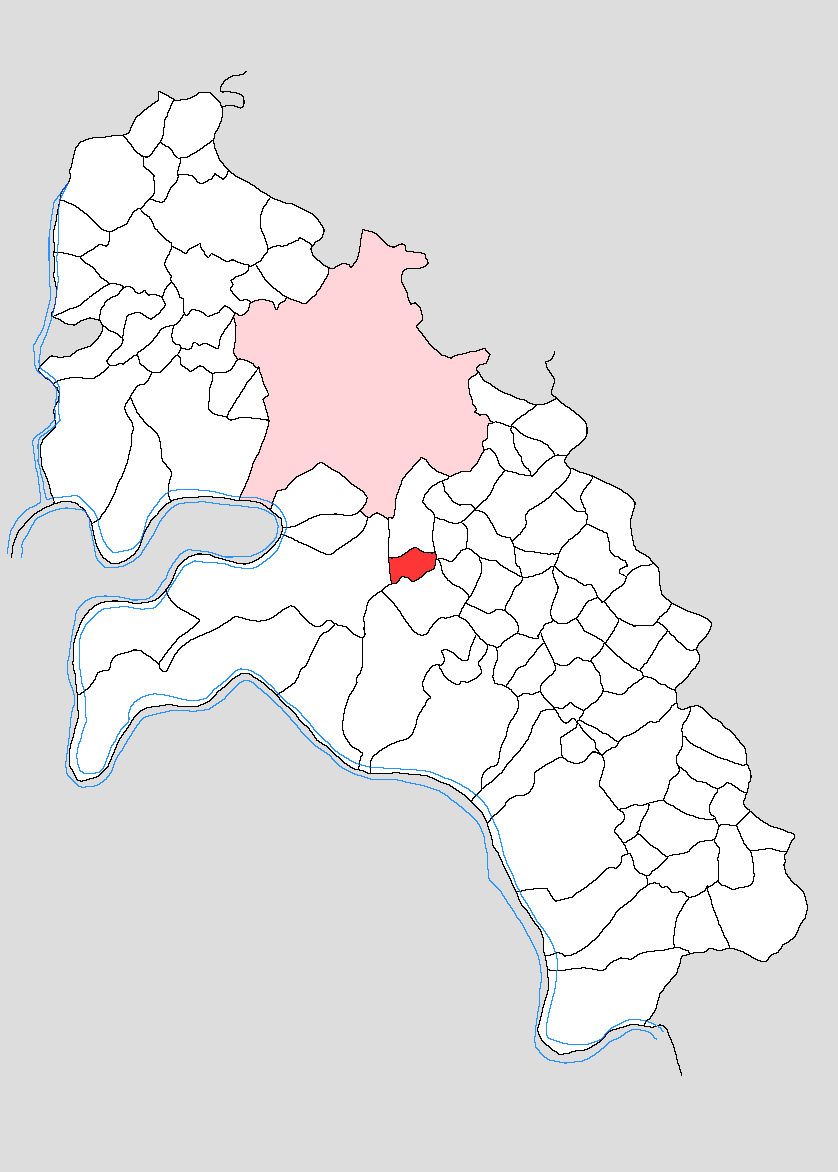
- Map showing Nasirpur in Firozabad block

- Location in Uttar Pradesh, India
- Coordinates: 27.10962°N 78.41271°E
- Country: India
- State: Uttar Pradesh
- District: Firozabad
- Tehsil: Firozabad

Area
  - Total: 1.002 km^{2} (0.387 sq mi)

Population (2011)
  - Total: 1,491
  - Density: 1,488/km^{2} (3,854/sq mi)
- Time zone: UTC+5:30 (IST)

Nasirpur (Nasīrpur) is a village in Firozabad block of Firozabad district, Uttar Pradesh. It is located southeast of Firozabad. As of 2011, it had a population of 1,491, in 225 households.

== Geography ==
Nasirpur is located south-southeast of Firozabad, to the east of a small stream called the Ganda Nala. The village is surrounded by farmland on all sides. To the north, along the road leading from Firozabad, is the village of Barkatpur; to the northeast is the village of Paharpur; to the east is Jahangirpur; and to the south is Basai Muhammadpur.

== Demographics ==
As of 2011, Nasirpur had a population of 1,491, in 225 households. This population was 53.4% male (796) and 46.6% female (695). The 0–6 age group numbered 339 (181 male and 158 female), making up 22.7% of the total population. 76 residents were members of Scheduled Castes, or 5.1% of the total.

The 1981 census recorded Nasirpur as having a population of 480 people (252 male and 228 female), in 79 households and 79 physical houses.

The 1961 census recorded Nasirpur as comprising 1 hamlet, with a total population of 360 people (179 male and 181 female), in 110 households and 86 physical houses. The area of the village was given as 247 acres.

== Infrastructure ==
As of 2011, Nasirpur had 1 primary school; it did not have any healthcare facilities. Drinking water was provided by hand pump; there were no public toilets. The village did not have a post office or public library; there was at least some access to electricity for all purposes. Streets were made of both kachcha and pakka materials.
