= Bhagipur Kotla =

Village in Uttar Pradesh, India

- Village
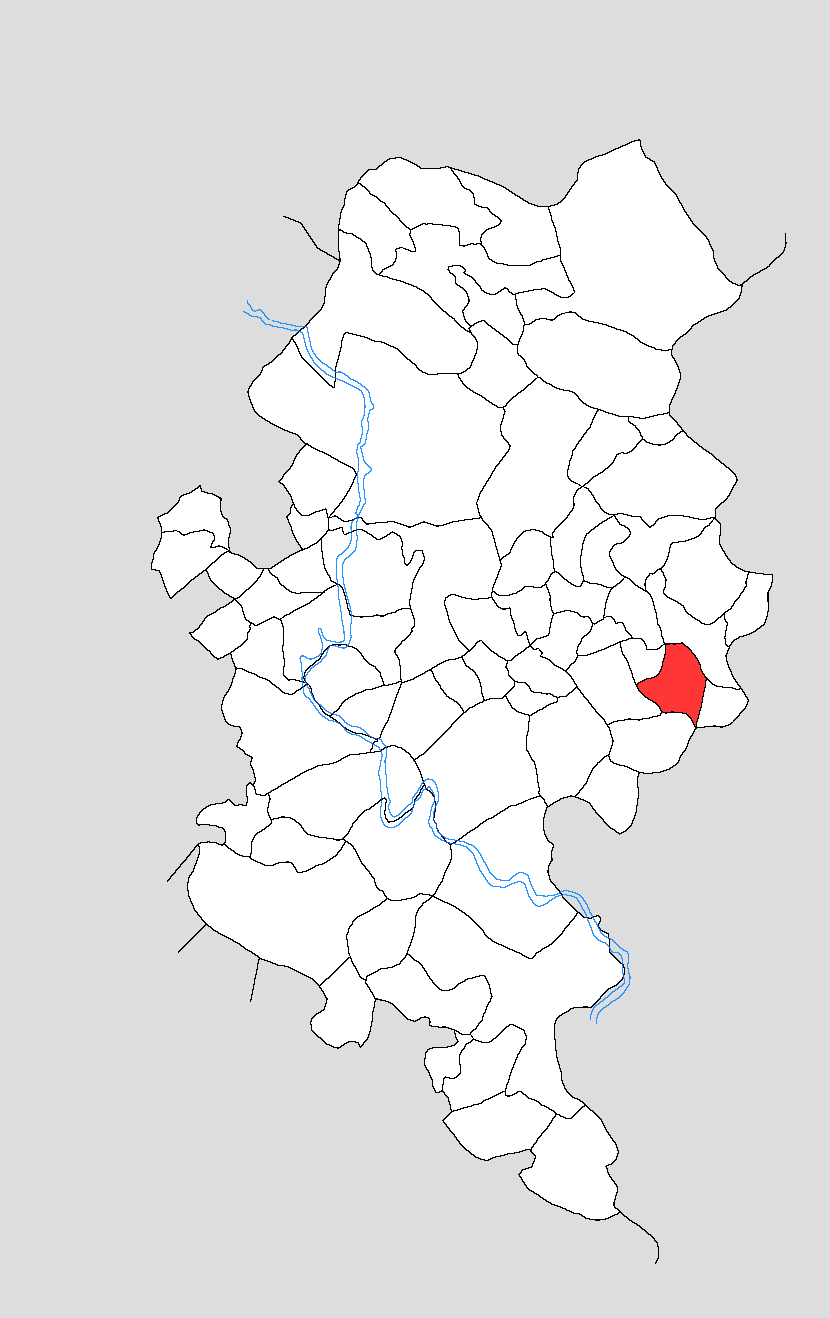
- Map showing Bhagipur Kotla in Kotla block

- Location in Uttar Pradesh, India
- Coordinates: 27.26611°N 78.46512°E
- Country: India
- State: Uttar Pradesh
- District: Firozabad
- Tehsil: Firozabad

Area
  - Total: 1.523 km^{2} (0.588 sq mi)

Population (2011)
  - Total: 0
  - Density: 0.0/km^{2} (0.0/sq mi)
- Time zone: UTC+5:30 (IST)

Bhagipur Kotla (Bhāgīpur Koṭlā) is an abandoned village in Kotla block of Firozabad district, Uttar Pradesh. As of 2011, it has a population of 0, although the land remains under human use.

== Demographics ==
The 2011 census recorded Bhagipur Kotla with a population of 0, but the 1981 census recorded it as having a population of 28 people (15 male and 13 female), in 5 households and 5 physical houses. The 1961 census also recorded Bhagipur Kotla (as just "Bhagipur") as inhabited: it comprised 1 hamlet, with a total population of 33 people (18 male and 15 female), in 8 households and 5 physical houses. The area of the village was given as 435 acres.

== Land use ==
According to the 2011 census, Bhagipur Kotla has a total area of 152.3 hectares, of which 124.7 were currently farmland, 12.3 were fallow lands, 3 were classified as cultivable but not under any use, and 12.4 were under non-agricultural use. There were no orchards, pastures, or forests on village lands, nor was any land classified as non-cultivable wasteland.
