= Khemkaranpur =

Khemkaranpur may refer to:

- Khemkaranpur, Firozabad, a village in Firozabad district, Uttar Pradesh
- Khemkaranpur, a village in Azamgarh district, Uttar Pradesh
- Khemkaranpur, a village in Pratapgarh district, Uttar Pradesh
- Khemkaranpur, a village in Bhojpur district, Bihar
- Khemkaranpur, a village in Jandaha block of Vaishali district, Bihar

== See also ==
- Khemkaran, a town in Punjab, India
