= Rupaspur, Firozabad =

Village in Uttar Pradesh, India

Rupaspur
- Village
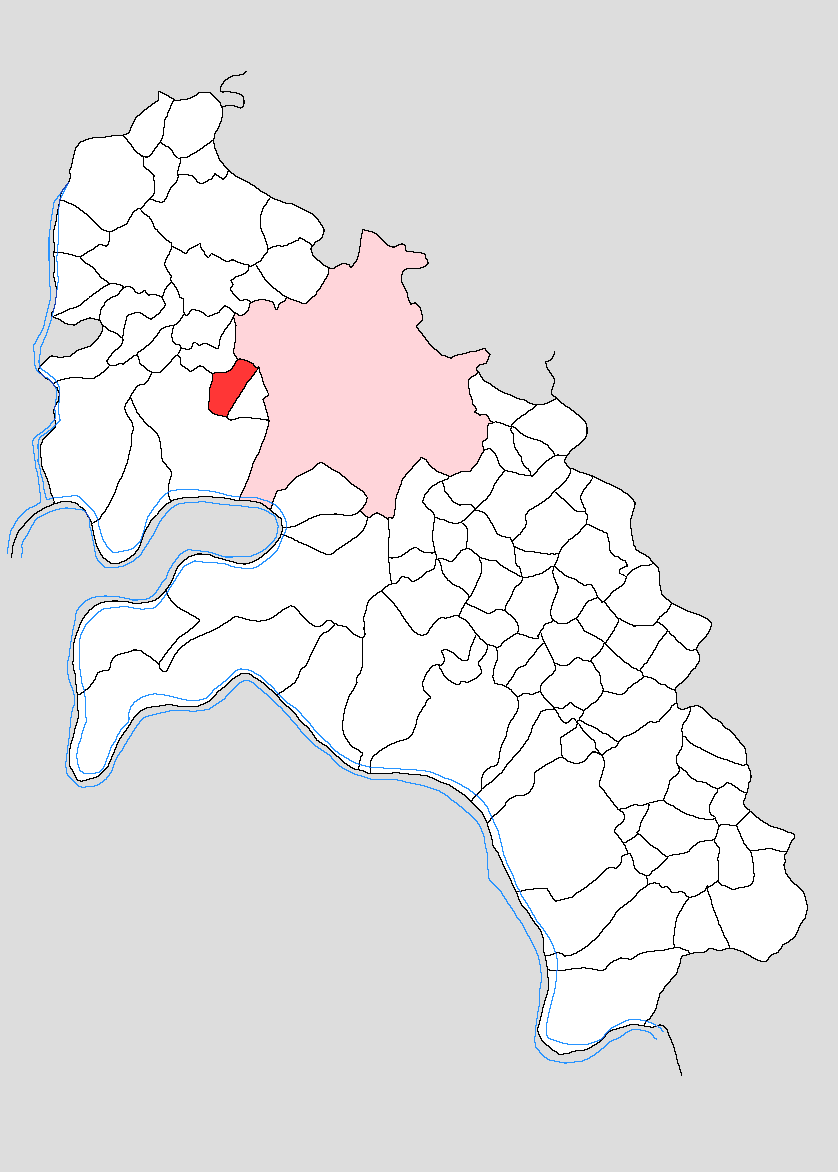
- Map showing Rupaspur in Firozabad block

- Location in Uttar Pradesh, India
- Coordinates: 27.15472°N 78.35479°E
- Country: India
- State: Uttar Pradesh
- District: Firozabad
- Tehsil: Firozabad

Area
  - Total: 1.187 km^{2} (0.458 sq mi)

Population (2011)
  - Total: 1,621
  - Density: 1,366/km^{2} (3,537/sq mi)
- Time zone: UTC+5:30 (IST)

Rupaspur (Rūpaspur) is a village in Firozabad block of Firozabad district, Uttar Pradesh. As of 2011, it had a population of 1,621, in 267 households.

== Geography ==
Rupaspur is located a short distance west of Firozabad, to the south of the main line of the Northern Railway.

== Demographics ==
As of 2011, Rupaspur had a population of 1,621, in 267 households. This population was 54.2% male (878) and 45.8% female (743). The 0–6 age group numbered 248 (136 male and 112 female), making up 15.3% of the total population. 605 residents were members of Scheduled Castes, or 37.3% of the total.

The 1981 census recorded Rupaspur as having a population of 584 people (326 male and 258 female), in 89 households and 89 physical houses.

The 1961 census recorded Rupaspur as comprising 2 hamlets, with a total population of 652 people (356 male and 296 female), in 101 households and 75 physical houses. The area of the village was given as 301 acres.

== Infrastructure ==
As of 2011, Rupaspur had 1 primary school; it did not have any healthcare facilities. Drinking water was provided by hand pump; there were no public toilets. The village had a public library but no post office; there was at least some access to electricity for all purposes. Streets were made of both kachcha and pakka materials.
