= Bhondela =

Village in Uttar Pradesh, India

- Village
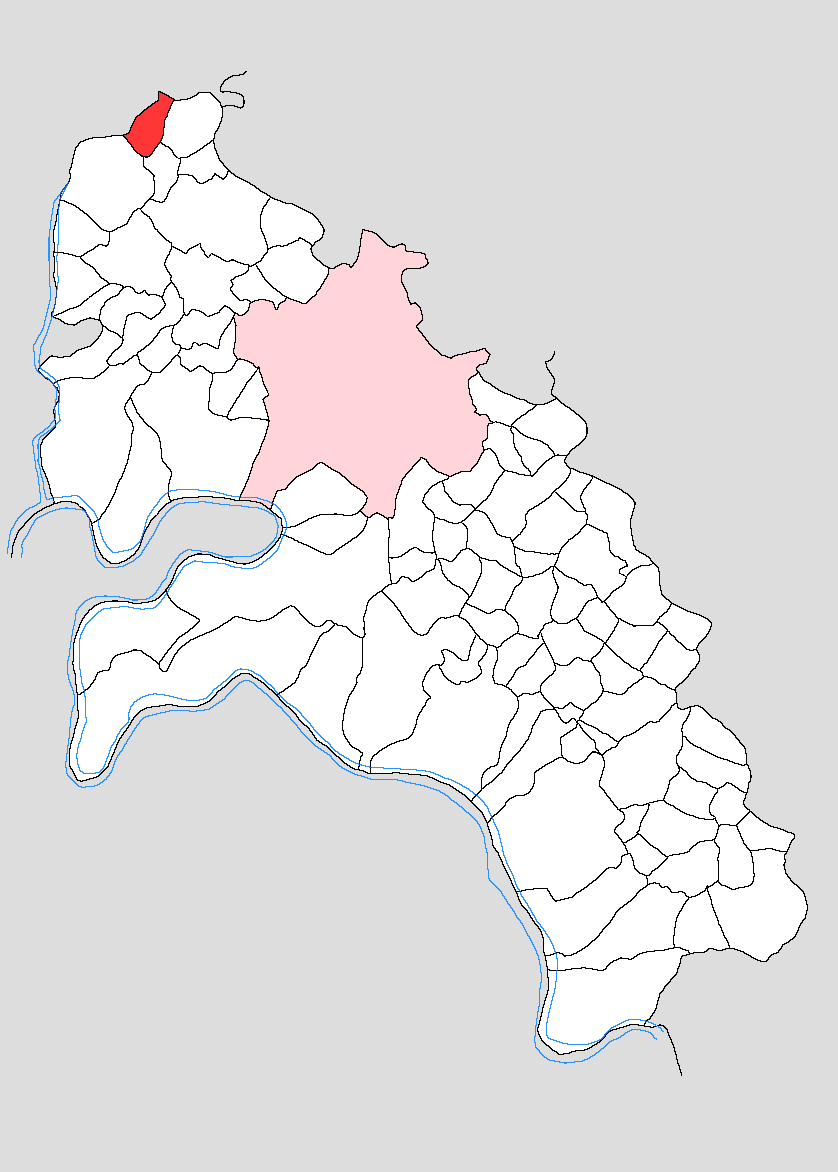
- Map showing Bhondela in Firozabad block

- Location in Uttar Pradesh, India
- Coordinates: 27.22142°N 78.32874°E
- Country: India
- State: Uttar Pradesh
- District: Firozabad
- Tehsil: Firozabad

Area
  - Total: 1.479 km^{2} (0.571 sq mi)

Population (2011)
  - Total: 1,328
  - Density: 897.9/km^{2} (2,326/sq mi)
- Time zone: UTC+5:30 (IST)

Bhondela is a village in Firozabad block of Firozabad district, Uttar Pradesh. As of 2011, it had a population of 1,328, in 211 households.

== Geography ==
Bhondela is located a short distance northwest of Firozabad, with the village of Usaini to the south and Khangrai to the east. The Nagau distributary canal passes near Bhondela on the northwest, and the village of Dinauli is on the other side.

== Demographics ==
As of 2011, Bhondela had a population of 1,328, in 211 households. This population was 51.4% male (682) and 48.6% female (646). The 0–6 age group numbered 220 (114 male and 106 female), making up 16.6% of the total population. 172 residents were members of Scheduled Castes, or 13.0% of the total.

The 1981 census recorded Bhondela (as "Bhondeka") as having a population of 904 people (504 male and 400 female), in 140 households and 140 physical houses.

The 1961 census recorded Bhondela as comprising 1 hamlet, with a total population of 619 people (338 male and 281 female), in 110 households and 74 physical houses. The area of the village was given as 366 acres and it had a medical practitioner at that point.

== Infrastructure ==
As of 2011, Bhondela had 2 primary schools and 1 primary health centre. Drinking water was provided by tap and hand pump; there were no public toilets. The village did not have a post office or public library; there was at least some access to electricity for all purposes. Streets were made of both kachcha and pakka materials.
