= Sufipur =

Village in Uttar Pradesh, India

- Village
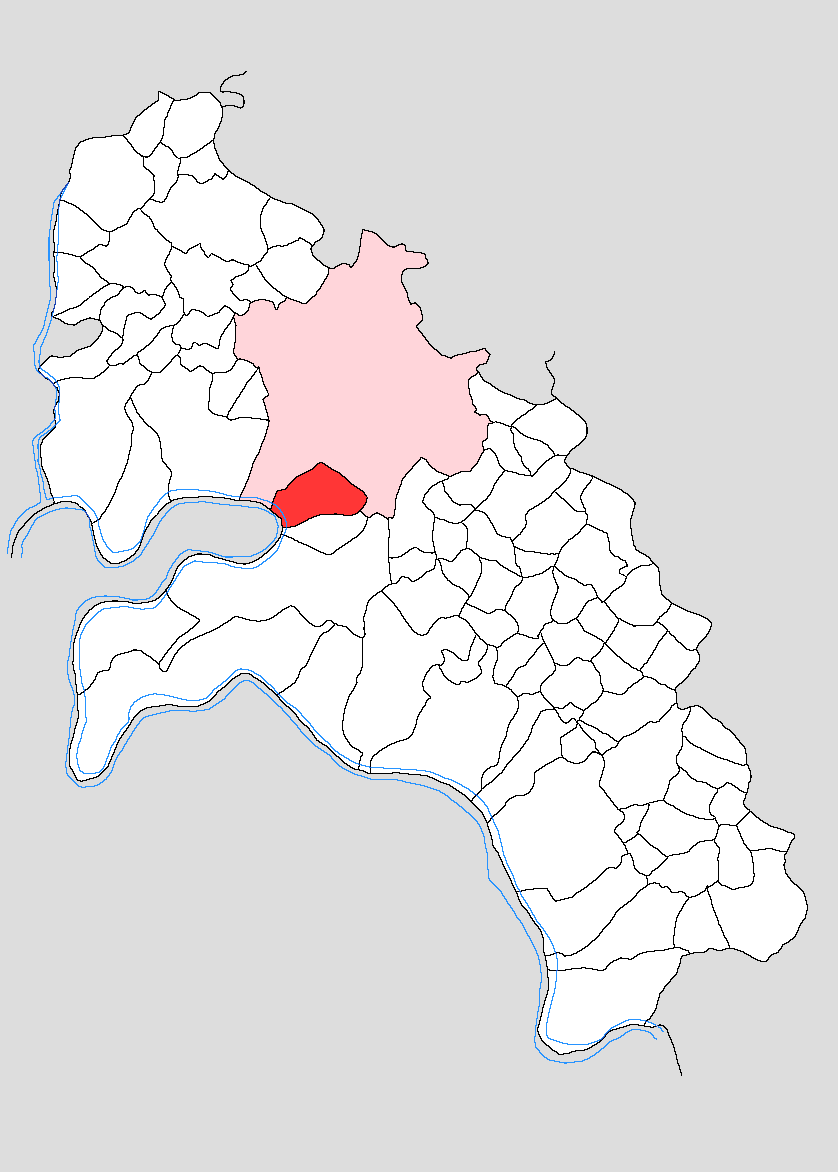
- Map showing Sufipur in Firozabad block

- Location in Uttar Pradesh, India
- Coordinates: 27.12626°N 78.38852°E
- Country: India
- State: Uttar Pradesh
- District: Firozabad
- Tehsil: Firozabad

Area
  - Total: 2.849 km^{2} (1.100 sq mi)

Population (2011)
  - Total: 2,792
  - Density: 980.0/km^{2} (2,538/sq mi)
- Time zone: UTC+5:30 (IST)
- PIN: 283203

Sufipur (Sūfīpur) is a village in Firozabad block of Firozabad district, Uttar Pradesh, India. As of 2011, it had a population of 2,792, in 486 households.

== Name ==
Sufipur is named after Shah Sufi, a Muslim holy man from the time of Akbar whose tomb is located north of the neighbouring village of Chandwar.

== Demographics ==
As of 2011, Sufipur had a population of 2,792, in 486 households. This population was 53.4% male (1,490) and 46.6% female (1,302). The 0–6 age group numbered 536 (261 male and 275 female), making up 19.2% of the total population. 34 residents were members of Scheduled Castes, or 1.2% of the total.

The 1981 census recorded Sufipur (as "Sofipur") as having a population of 1,441 people (784 male and 657 female), in 324 households and 274 physical houses.

The 1961 census recorded Sufipur as comprising 1 hamlet, with a total population of 885 people (494 male and 391 female), in 143 households and 117 physical houses. The area of the village was given as 746 acres.

== Infrastructure ==
As of 2011, Sufipur had 2 primary schools; it did not have any healthcare facilities. Drinking water was provided by hand pump and tube well/borehole; there were no public toilets. The village did not have a post office or public library; there was at least some access to electricity for all purposes. Streets were made of kachcha materials.
