= Wazirpur Anandipur =

Village in Uttar Pradesh, India

- Village
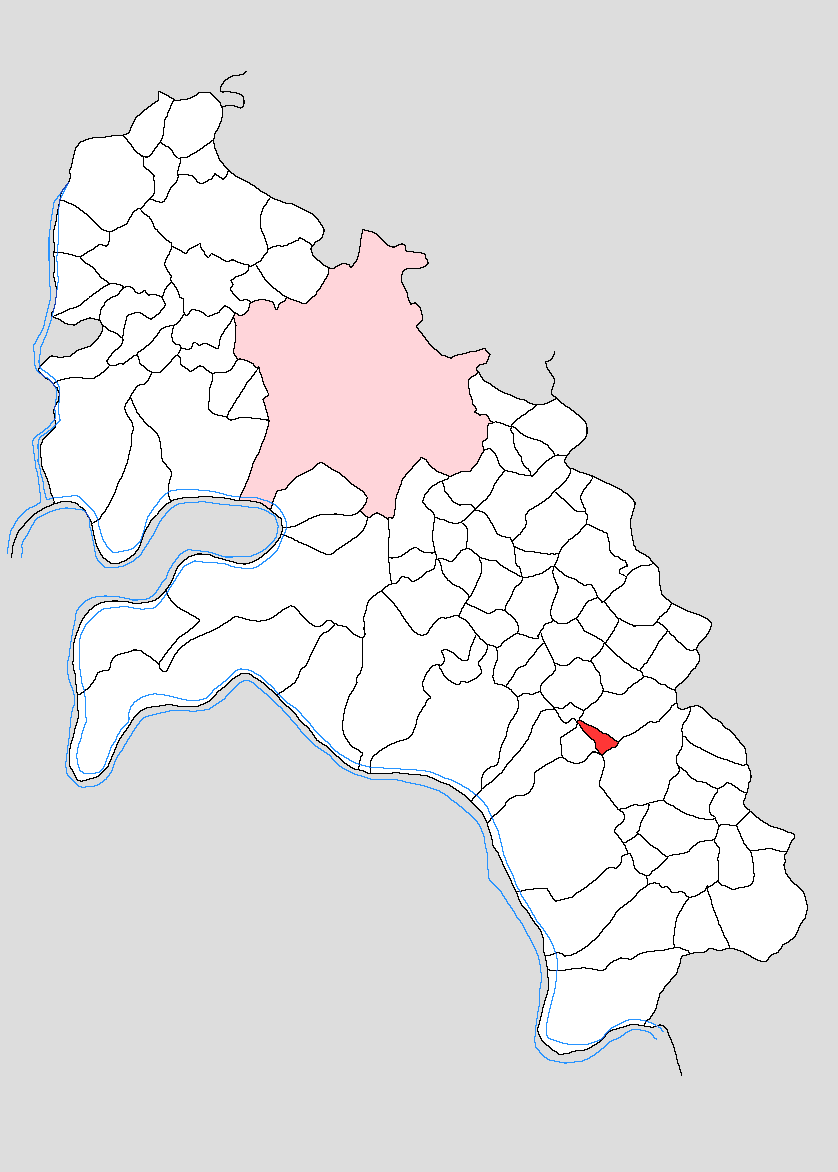
- Map showing Wazirpur Anandipur in Firozabad block

- Location in Uttar Pradesh, India
- Coordinates: 27.06416°N 78.46581°E
- Country: India
- State: Uttar Pradesh
- District: Firozabad
- Tehsil: Firozabad

Area
  - Total: 0.560 km^{2} (0.216 sq mi)

Population (2011)
  - Total: 186
  - Density: 332/km^{2} (860/sq mi)
- Time zone: UTC+5:30 (IST)

Wazirpur Anandipur (Wazīrpur Ānandīpur) is a small village in Firozabad block of Firozabad district, Uttar Pradesh. It is located southeast of Firozabad. As of 2011, it had a population of 186, in 26 households.

== Geography ==
Wazirpur Anandipur is located southeast of Firozabad and is surrounded by level farmland. Nearby villages include Satkai to the northwest, Matsena to the northeast, and Itora to the east.

== Demographics ==
As of 2011, Wazirpur Anandipur had a population of 186, in 26 households. This population was 58.1% male (108) and 41.9% female (78). The 0–6 age group numbered 29 (13 male and 16 female), making up 15.6% of the total population. 44 residents were members of Scheduled Castes, or 23.7% of the total.

The 1981 census recorded Wazirpur Anandipur as having a population of 107 people (60 male and 47 female), in 15 households and 15 physical houses.

The 1961 census recorded Wazirpur Anandipur as comprising 1 hamlet, with a total population of 50 people (32 male and 18 female), in 5 households and 2 physical houses. The area of the village was given as 138 acres.

== Infrastructure ==
As of 2011, Wazirpur Anandipur had 1 primary school; it did not have any healthcare facilities. Drinking water was provided by hand pump and tube well/bore well; there were no public toilets. The village did not have a post office or public library; there was at least some access to electricity for all purposes. Streets were made of both kachcha and pakka materials.
