= Ulau =

Village in Uttar Pradesh, India

- Village
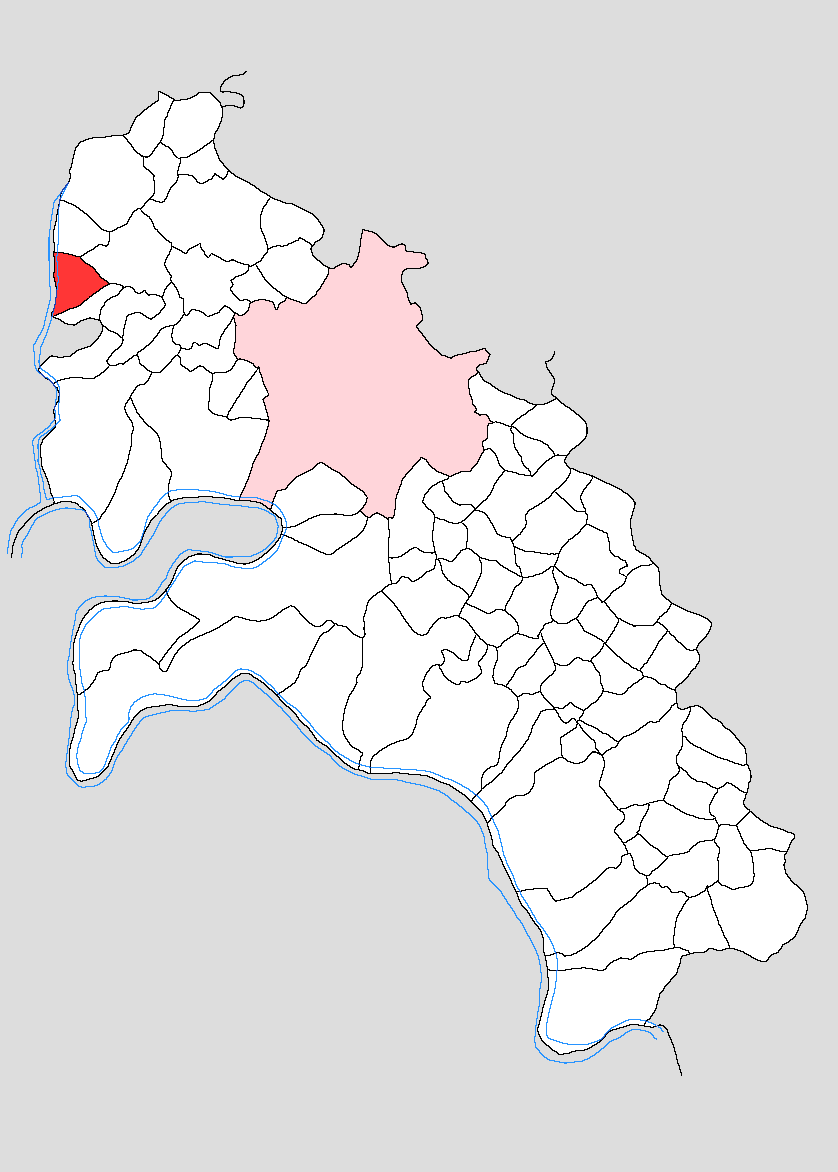
- Map showing Ulau in Firozabad block

- Location in Uttar Pradesh, India
- Coordinates: 27.18315°N 78.31423°E
- Country: India
- State: Uttar Pradesh
- District: Firozabad
- Tehsil: Firozabad

Area
  - Total: 1.866 km^{2} (0.720 sq mi)

Population (2011)
  - Total: 4,705
  - Density: 2,521/km^{2} (6,530/sq mi)
- Time zone: UTC+5:30 (IST)

Ulau (Ulāū) is a large village in Firozabad block of Firozabad district, Uttar Pradesh. As of 2011, it had a population of 4,785, in 792 households.

== Geography ==
Ulau is located northwest of Firozabad, a bit to the north of the main line of the Northern Railway. The Jhirna Nala flows past Ulau on the west. The village of Khemkaranpur is to the south, and Salempur Nagla Khar is to the north, while the hamlet of Akbarpur is to the east.

== Demographics ==
As of 2011, Ulau had a population of 4,785, in 792 households. This population was 55.4% male (2,570) and 44.6% female (2,135). The 0-6 age group numbered 755 (405 male and 350 female), making up 15.8% of the total population. 611 residents were members of Scheduled Castes, or 12.8% of the total.

The 1981 census recorded Ulau (as "Ulao") as having a population of 2,990 people (1,715 male and 1,275 female), in 352 households and 342 physical houses.

The 1961 census recorded Ulau as comprising 3 hamlets, with a total population of 2,202 people (1,254 male and 948 female), in 185 households and 131 physical houses. The area of the village was given as 461 acres and it had a medical practitioner at that point.

== Infrastructure ==
As of 2011, Ulau had 4 primary schools; it did not have any healthcare facilities. Drinking water was provided by tap, hand pump, and tube well/bore well; there were no public toilets. The village did not have a post office or public library; there was at least some access to electricity for residential and agricultural (but not commercial) purposes. Streets were made of both kachcha and pakka materials.
