= Phulaichi =

Village in Uttar Pradesh, India

- Village
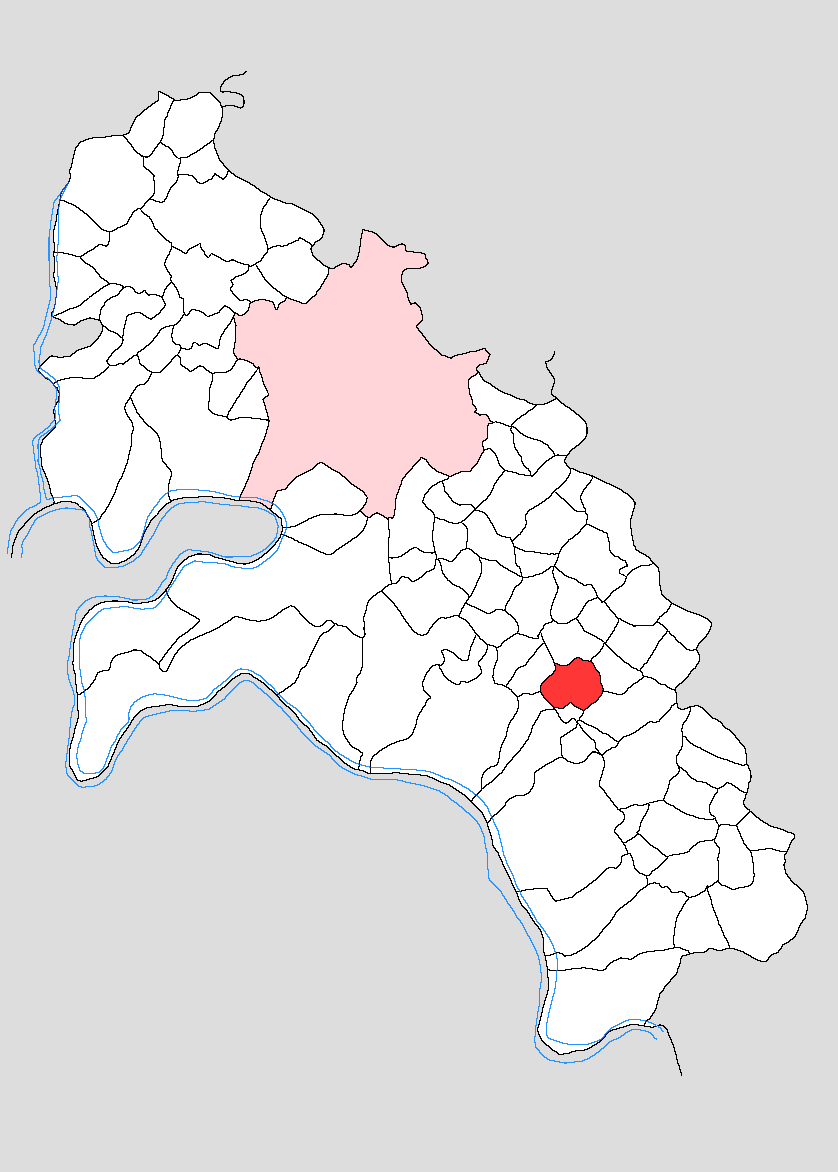
- Map showing Phulaichi in Firozabad block

- Location in Uttar Pradesh, India
- Coordinates: 27.07885°N 78.46081°E
- Country: India
- State: Uttar Pradesh
- District: Firozabad
- Tehsil: Firozabad

Area
  - Total: 1.421 km^{2} (0.549 sq mi)

Population (2011)
  - Total: 1,450
  - Density: 1,020/km^{2} (2,640/sq mi)
- Time zone: UTC+5:30 (IST)

Phulaichi is a village in Firozabad block of Firozabad district, Uttar Pradesh. As of 2011, it had a population of 1,450, in 253 households.

== Geography ==
Phulaichi is located southeast of Firozabad and is surrounded by farmland with basically level terrain. Nearby villages include Matsena to the southeast and Matamai to the northwest.

== Demographics ==
As of 2011, Phulaichi had a population of 1,450, in 253 households. This population was 55.4% male (803) and 44.6% female (647). The 0–6 age group numbered 226 (137 male and 89 female), making up 15.6% of the total population. 516 residents were members of Scheduled Castes, or 35.6% of the total.

The 1981 census recorded Phulaichi as having a population of 722 people (418 male and 304 female), in 116 households and 115 physical houses.

The 1961 census recorded Phulaichi as comprising 1 hamlet, with a total population of 500 people (277 male and 223 female), in 65 households and 58 physical houses. The area of the village was given as 350 acres.

== Infrastructure ==
As of 2011, Phulaichi had 1 primary school; it did not have any healthcare facilities. Drinking water was provided by hand pump and tube well/bore well; there were no public toilets. The village did not have a post office or public library; there was at least some access to electricity for all purposes. Streets were made of both kachcha and pakka materials.
