= Lalau =

Village in Uttar Pradesh, India

- Village
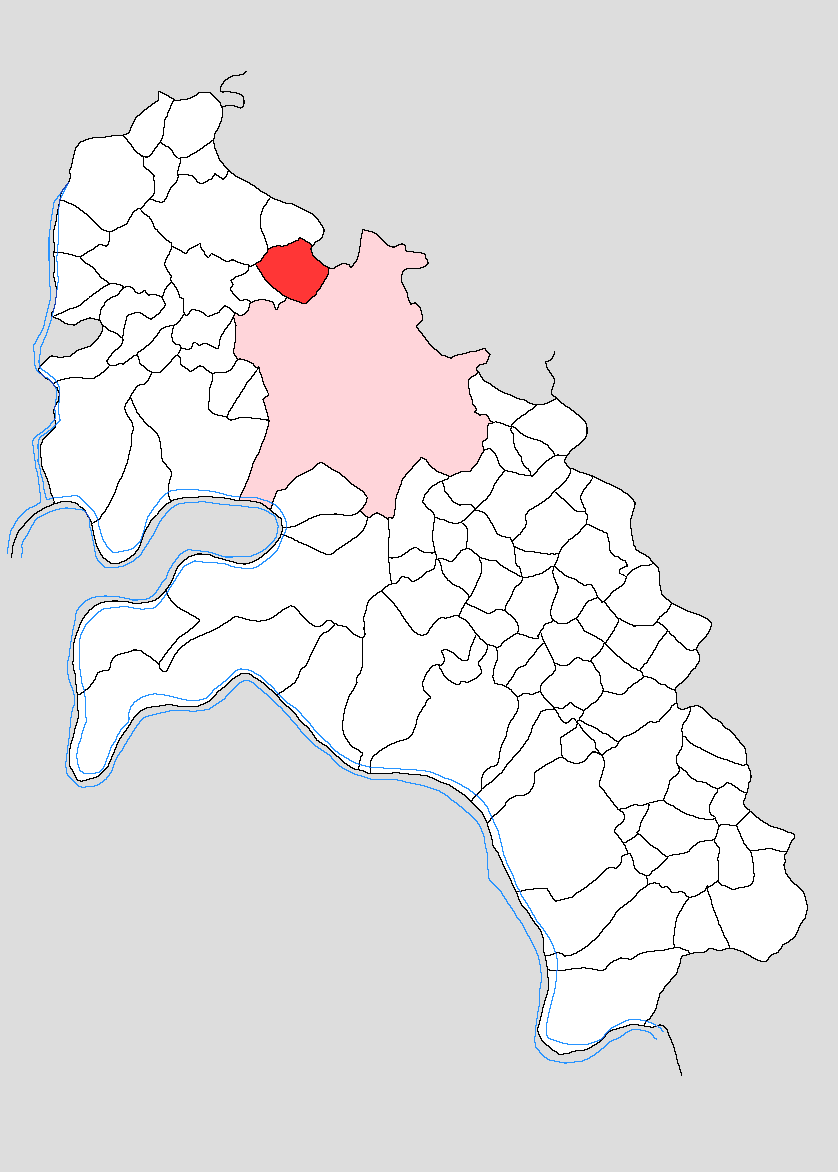
- Map showing Lalau in Firozabad block

- Location in Uttar Pradesh, India
- Coordinates: 27.18104°N 78.37376°E
- Country: India
- State: Uttar Pradesh
- District: Firozabad
- Tehsil: Firozabad

Area
  - Total: 2.559 km^{2} (0.988 sq mi)

Population (2011)
  - Total: 2,719
  - Density: 1,063/km^{2} (2,752/sq mi)
- Time zone: UTC+5:30 (IST)

Lalau (Lālaū) is a village in Firozabad block of Firozabad district, Uttar Pradesh. It is located just outside the city on the northwest. As of 2011, it had a population of 2,719, in 456 households.

== Geography ==
Lalau is located immediately northwest of Firozabad's built-up area.

== Demographics ==
As of 2011, Lalau had a population of 2,719, in 456 households. This population was 55.2% male (1,501) and 44.8% female (1,218). The 0–6 age group numbered 394 (226 male and 168 female), making up 14.5% of the total population. 1,141 residents were members of Scheduled Castes, or 42.0% of the total.

The 1981 census recorded Lalau as having a population of 1,350 people (737 male and 613 female), in 222 households and 221 physical houses.

The 1961 census recorded Lalau as comprising 2 hamlets, with a total population of 819 people (456 male and 363 female), in 151 households and 97 physical houses. The area of the village was given as 632 acres.

== Infrastructure ==
As of 2011, Lalau had 1 primary school; it did not have any healthcare facilities. Drinking water was provided by tap, hand pump, and tube well/bore well; there were no public toilets. The village did not have a post office or public library; there was at least some access to electricity for all purposes. Streets were made of both kachcha and pakka materials.
