= Basai Muhammadpur =

Village in Uttar Pradesh, India

- Village
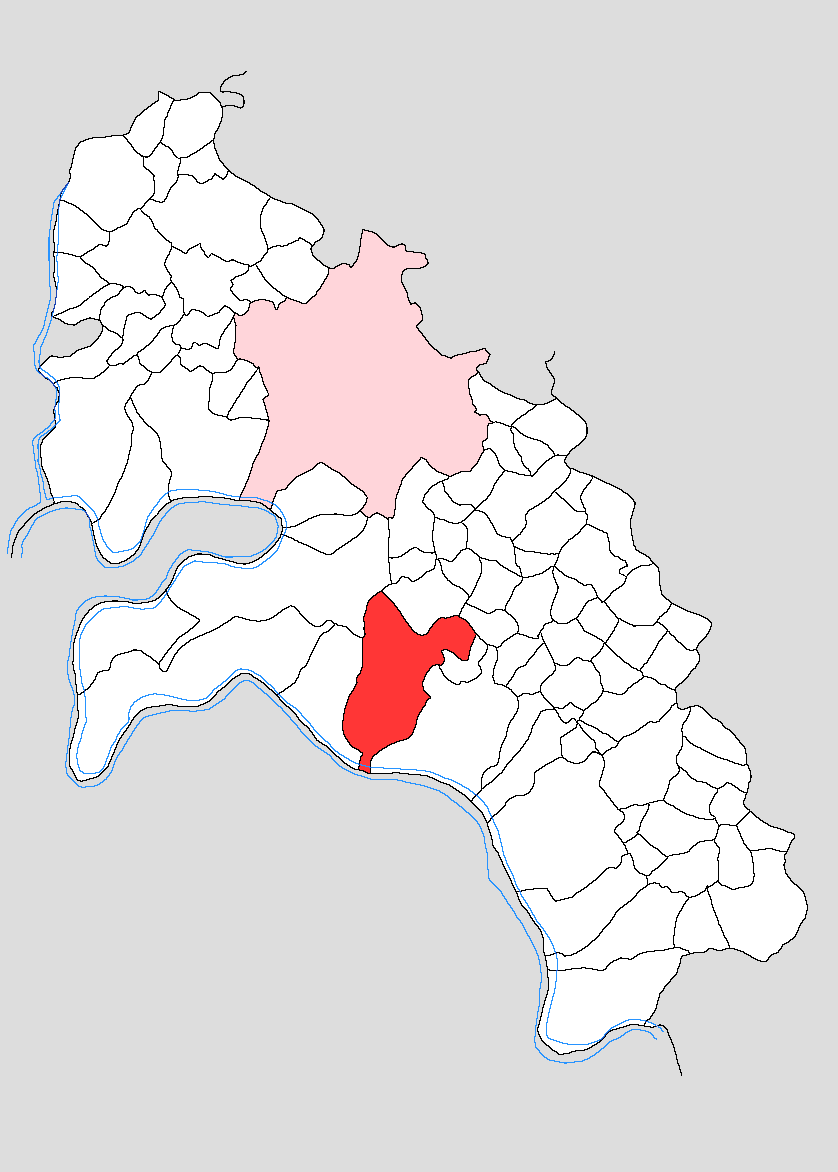
- Map showing Basai Muhammadpur in Firozabad block

- Location in Uttar Pradesh, India
- Coordinates: 27.07901°N 78.40691°E
- Country: India
- State: Uttar Pradesh
- District: Firozabad
- Tehsil: Firozabad

Area
  - Total: 9.226 km^{2} (3.562 sq mi)

Population (2011)
  - Total: 5,055
  - Density: 547.9/km^{2} (1,419/sq mi)
- Time zone: UTC+5:30 (IST)

Basai Muhammadpur (Basaī Muhammadpur), also spelled Basai Mohammadpur, is a village in Firozabad block of Firozabad district, Uttar Pradesh. It is located south of Firozabad. As of 2011, it had a population of 5,055, in 839 households.

== Geography ==
Basai Muhammadpur is located south of Firozabad, to the east of a small stream called the Ganda Nala. The land to the west of the village is cut up by ravines that lead to the Ganda Nala. To the southwest, near a small hamlet called Anta ki Marhaiya, the Ganda Nala flows into the Yamuna. East of this is a large patch of dense babul woodland that forms part of the Firozabad Reserved Forest. This forest is due south of Basai Muhammadpur itself, between the village and the Yamuna. Another dense patch of forest is located to the northwest of Basai Muhammadpur, on the other side of the Ganda Nala. The areas north and east of Basai Muhammadpur, though, are dominated by open farmland. To the east of Basai Muhammadpur is the village of Anandipur Karkauli, while to the northeast are Nurpur Kutubpur and the market village of Bilahna.

== Demographics ==
As of 2011, Basai Muhammadpur had a population of 5,055, in 839 households. This population was 53.9% male (2,726) and 46.1% female (2,329). The 0–6 age group numbered 1,022 (545 male and 477 female), making up 20.2% of the total population. 888 residents were members of Scheduled Castes, or 17.6% of the total.

The 1981 census recorded Basai Muhammadpur as having a population of 2,766 people (1,525 male and 1,241 female), in 514 households and 514 physical houses.

The 1961 census recorded Basai Muhammadpur as comprising 4 hamlets, with a total population of 2,146 people (1,135 male and 1,011 female), in 403 households and 306 physical houses. The area of the village was given as 2,286 acres.

== Infrastructure ==
As of 2011, Basai Muhammadpur had 3 primary schools and 1 primary health centre. Drinking water was provided by tap, hand pump, and tube well/bore well; there were no public toilets. The village had a sub post office but no public library; there was at least some access to electricity for all purposes. Streets were made of both kachcha and pakka materials.
