= Matsena, India =

Village in Uttar Pradesh, India

Matsena
- Village
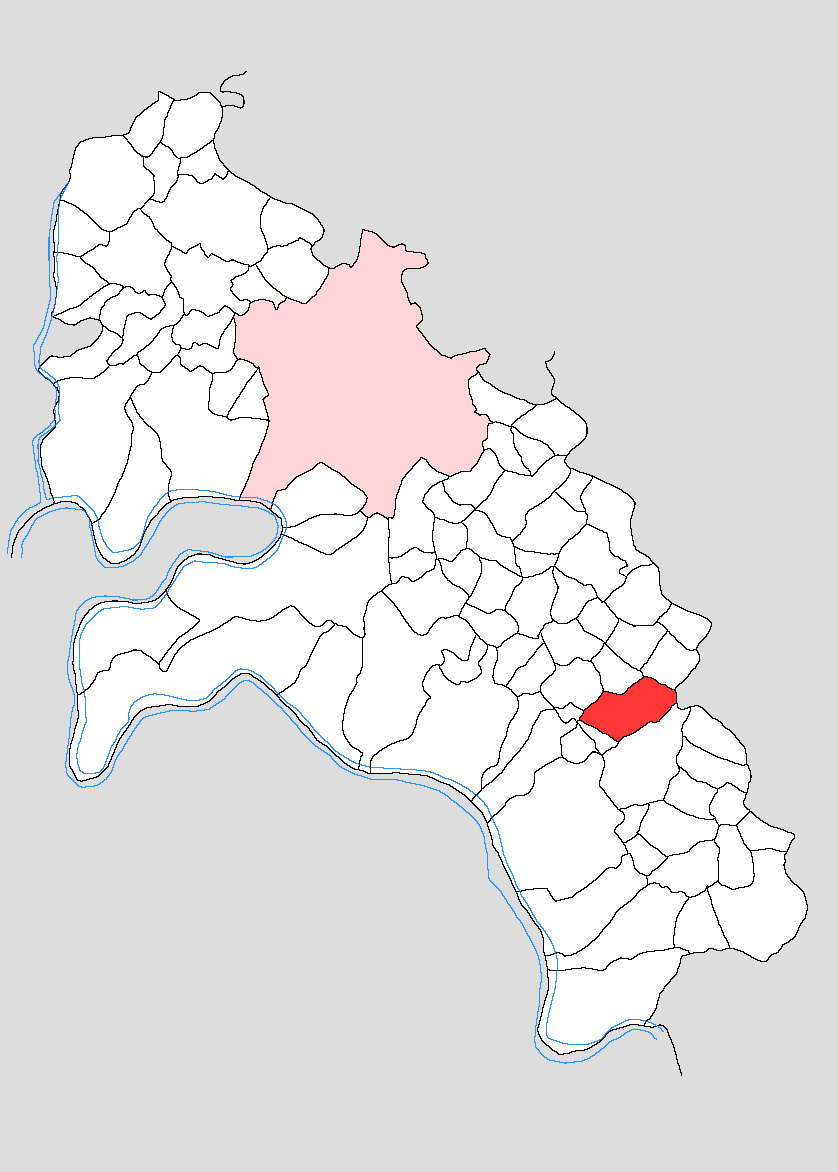
- Map showing Matsena in Firozabad block

- Location in Uttar Pradesh, India
- Coordinates: 27.07418°N 78.4741°E
- Country: India
- State: Uttar Pradesh
- District: Firozabad
- Tehsil: Firozabad

Area
  - Total: 4.010 km^{2} (1.548 sq mi)

Population (2011)
  - Total: 2,533
  - Density: 631.7/km^{2} (1,636/sq mi)
- Time zone: UTC+5:30 (IST)

Matsena (Maṭsenā) is a village in Firozabad block of Firozabad district, Uttar Pradesh. It is located to the southeast of Firozabad, near the tehsil boundary with Shikohabad. As of 2011, it had a population of 2,533, in 401 households.

== Geography ==
Matsena is located southeast of Firozabad, close to the tehsil boundary with Shikohabad. There is a large tank on the east side of the village, and next to it is a police station. A rural district road comes down to Matsena from Firozabad to the northwest by way of Jamalpur, Balchandpur, Ladupur Chakarpur, and Matamai; from Matsena, it continues on to the southeast toward Jendamai. Other nearby villages include Itora to the south, Wazirpur Anandipur, Satkai, and Kindarpur to the southwest, Phulaichi to the west, Nagria and Hamirpur to the north, and Undani to the northeast. The surrounding area is basically all level farmland.

== Demographics ==
As of 2011, Matsena had a population of 2,533, in 401 households. This population was 55.1% male (1,396) and 44.9% female (1,137). The 0–6 age group numbered 443 (258 male and 185 female), making up 17.5% of the total population. 512 residents were members of Scheduled Castes, or 20.2% of the total.

The 1981 census recorded Matsena as having a population of 1,406 people (760 male and 646 female), in 241 households and 234 physical houses.

The 1961 census recorded Matsena (as "Mathsena") as comprising 3 hamlets, with a total population of 969 people (525 male and 444 female), in 166 households and 120 physical houses. The area of the village was given as 724 acres and it had a medical practitioner at that point.

== Infrastructure ==
As of 2011, Matsena had 1 primary school and 1 primary health centre. Drinking water was provided by tap, well, hand pump, and tube well/bore well; there were no public toilets. The village had a sub post office but no public library; there was at least some access to electricity for all purposes. Streets were made of both kachcha and pakka materials.
