= Anandipur Karkauli =

Village in Uttar Pradesh, India

- Village
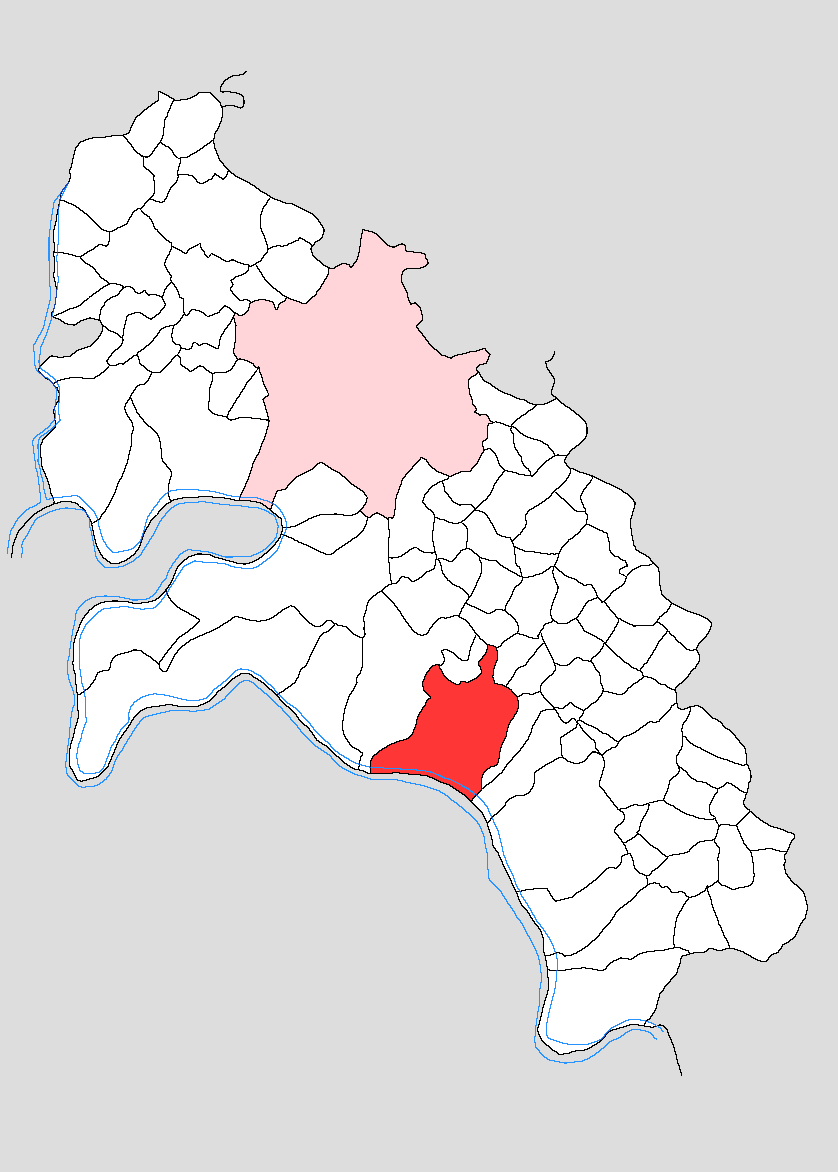
- Map showing Anandipur Karkauli in Firozabad block

- Location in Uttar Pradesh, India
- Coordinates: 27.07044°N 78.42975°E
- Country: India
- State: Uttar Pradesh
- District: Firozabad
- Tehsil: Firozabad

Area
  - Total: 8.920 km^{2} (3.444 sq mi)

Population (2011)
  - Total: 3,508
  - Density: 393.3/km^{2} (1,019/sq mi)
- Time zone: UTC+5:30 (IST)
- PIN: 283203

Anandipur Karkauli (Ānandīpur Karkaulī) is a village in Firozabad block of Firozabad district, Uttar Pradesh. It is located southeast of Firozabad and north of the Yamuna, with part of the Firozabad Reserved Forest coming between the village and the river. As of 2011, Anandipur Karkauli had a population of 3,508, in 574 households.

== Geography ==
Anandipur Karkauli is located southeast of Firozabad and a bit north of the Yamuna river. To the north of the village is level farmland, while to the south are a series of steep ravines that channel surface runoff south to the Yamuna. Much of this area, which covers basically everything between Anandipur Karkauli and the Yamuna, is densely forested. Babul is the dominant tree species in this area. Most of it is part of the Firozabad Reserve Forest, which also includes various other patches of woodland in the district. The village of Pempur Anandipur is located to the southeast of Anandipur Karkauli, while the hamlet of Agrupura is located to the west; both are also on the northern edge of the forest. Farther northwest is the village of Basai Muhammadpur.

== Demographics ==
As of 2011, Anandipur Karkauli had a population of 3,508, in 574 households. This population was 54.7% male (1,920) and 45.3% female (1,588). The 0–6 age group numbered 692 (372 male and 320 female), making up 19.7% of the total population. 221 residents were members of Scheduled Castes, or 6.3% of the total.

The 1981 census recorded Anandipur Karkauli as having a population of 2,448 people (1,342 male and 1,106 female), in 416 households and 415 physical houses.

The 1961 census recorded Anandipur Karkauli (as "Anandipur Karkoli") as comprising 5 hamlets, with a total population of 1,844 people (975 male and 869 female), in 312 households and 235 physical houses. The area of the village was given as 2,222 acres and it had a medical practitioner at that point.

== Infrastructure ==
As of 2011, Anandipur Karkauli had 2 primary schools; it did not have any healthcare facilities. Drinking water was provided by hand pump and tube well/bore well; there were no public toilets. The village did not have a post office or public library; there was at least some access to electricity for all purposes. Streets were made of both kachcha and pakka materials.
