= Saramai =

Village in Uttar Pradesh, India

- Village
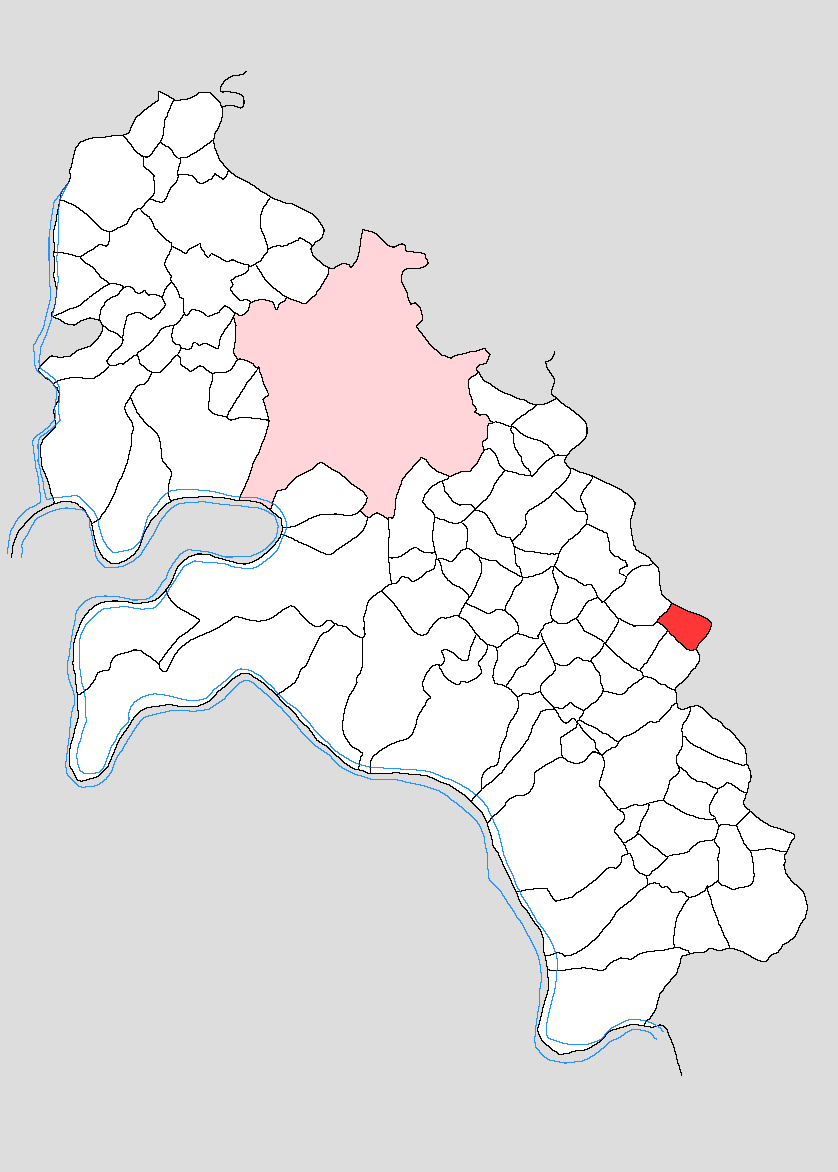
- Map showing Saramai in Firozabad block

- Location in Uttar Pradesh, India
- Coordinates: 27.09300°N 78.49027°E
- Country: India
- State: Uttar Pradesh
- District: Firozabad
- Tehsil: Firozabad

Area
  - Total: 1.286 km^{2} (0.497 sq mi)

Population (2011)
  - Total: 1,409
  - Density: 1,096/km^{2} (2,838/sq mi)
- Time zone: UTC+5:30 (IST)

Saramai (Saṛāmaī) is a village in Firozabad block of Firozabad district, Uttar Pradesh. As of 2011, it had a population of 1,409, in 246 households.

== Demographics ==
As of 2011, Saramai had a population of 1,409, in 246 households. This population was 53.7% male (757) and 46.3% female (652). The 0–6 age group numbered 235 (112 male and 123 female), making up 16.7% of the total population. 791 residents were members of Scheduled Castes, or 56.1% of the total.

The 1981 census recorded Saramai as having a population of 861 people (475 male and 386 female), in 132 households and 132 physical houses.

The 1961 census recorded Saramai as comprising 1 hamlet, with a total population of 726 people (388 male and 338 female), in 121 households and 104 physical houses. The area of the village was given as 318 acres and it had a post office at that point.

== Infrastructure ==
As of 2011, Saramai had 1 primary school; it did not have any healthcare facilities. Drinking water was provided by tap, hand pump, and tube well/bore well; there were no public toilets. The village did not have a post office or public library; there was at least some access to electricity for residential and agricultural (but not commercial) purposes. Streets were made of both kachcha and pakka materials.
