= Basdeopur, Firozabad =

Village in Uttar Pradesh, India

Basdeopur
- Village
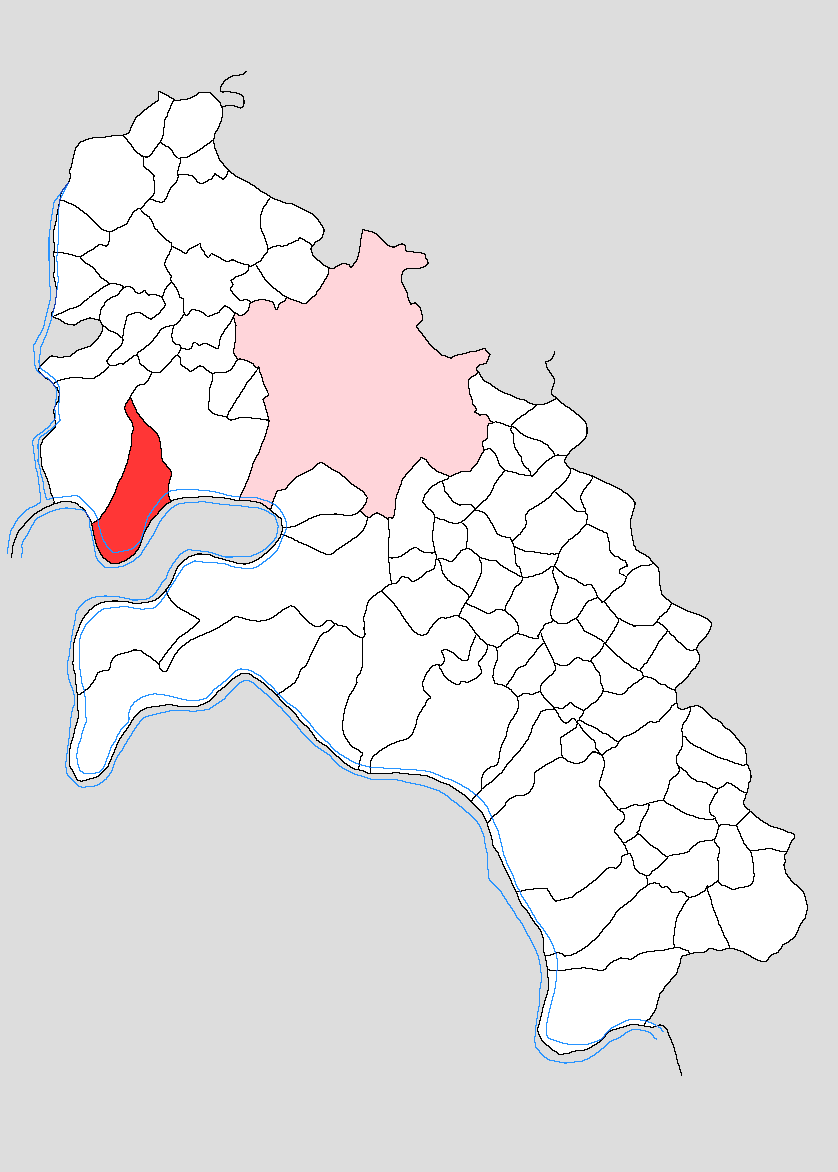
- Map showing Basdeopur in Firozabad block

- Location in Uttar Pradesh, India
- Coordinates: 27.13833°N 78.33323°E
- Country: India
- State: Uttar Pradesh
- District: Firozabad
- Tehsil: Firozabad

Area
  - Total: 0.942 km^{2} (0.364 sq mi)

Population (2011)
  - Total: 1,868
  - Density: 1,980/km^{2} (5,140/sq mi)
- Time zone: UTC+5:30 (IST)
- PIN: 283203

Basdeopur (Bāsdevpur) is a village in Firozabad block of Firozabad district, Uttar Pradesh. It is located southwest of Firozabad, on the edge of the ravines leading down to the Yamuna. As of 2011, it had a population of 1,868, in 290 households.

== Geography ==
Basdeopur is located southwest of Firozabad, right on the edge between the cultivated plains to the north and the rugged ravines leading down to the Yamuna to the south. There is also an area of ravines on the east side of the village. To the southwest is an area of open scrubland that belongs to the Firozabad Reserved Forest. About 1 km to the west is the hamlet of Sujatgarh, while a bit farther away to the east is the village of Gundau. To the southwest, on the other side of the forest reserve, is the hamlet of Nandan. To the north are several hamlets: from west to east, they are Nagla Girdhari, Nagla Asa, Nagla Sadasukh, and Nagla Tikat, with another called Nagla Dansabai just to the south of Nagla Tikat.

== Demographics ==
As of 2011, Basdeopur had a population of 1,868, in 290 households. This population was 53.3% male (995) and 46.7% female (873). The 0–6 age group numbered 283 (141 male and 142 female), making up 15.1% of the total population. 16 residents were members of Scheduled Castes, or 0.8% of the total.

The 1981 census recorded Basdeopur as having a population of 1,123 people (618 male and 505 female), in 126 households and 124 physical houses.

The 1961 census recorded Basdeopur as comprising 1 hamlet, with a total population of 342 people (182 male and 160 female), in 53 households and 43 physical houses. The area of the village was given as 233 acres.

== Infrastructure ==
As of 2011, Basdeopur had 2 primary schools; it did not have any healthcare facilities. Drinking water was provided by hand pump; there were no public toilets. The village did not have a post office or public library; there was at least some access to electricity for all purposes. Streets were made of both kachcha and pakka materials.
