= Undani =

Village in Uttar Pradesh, India

- Village
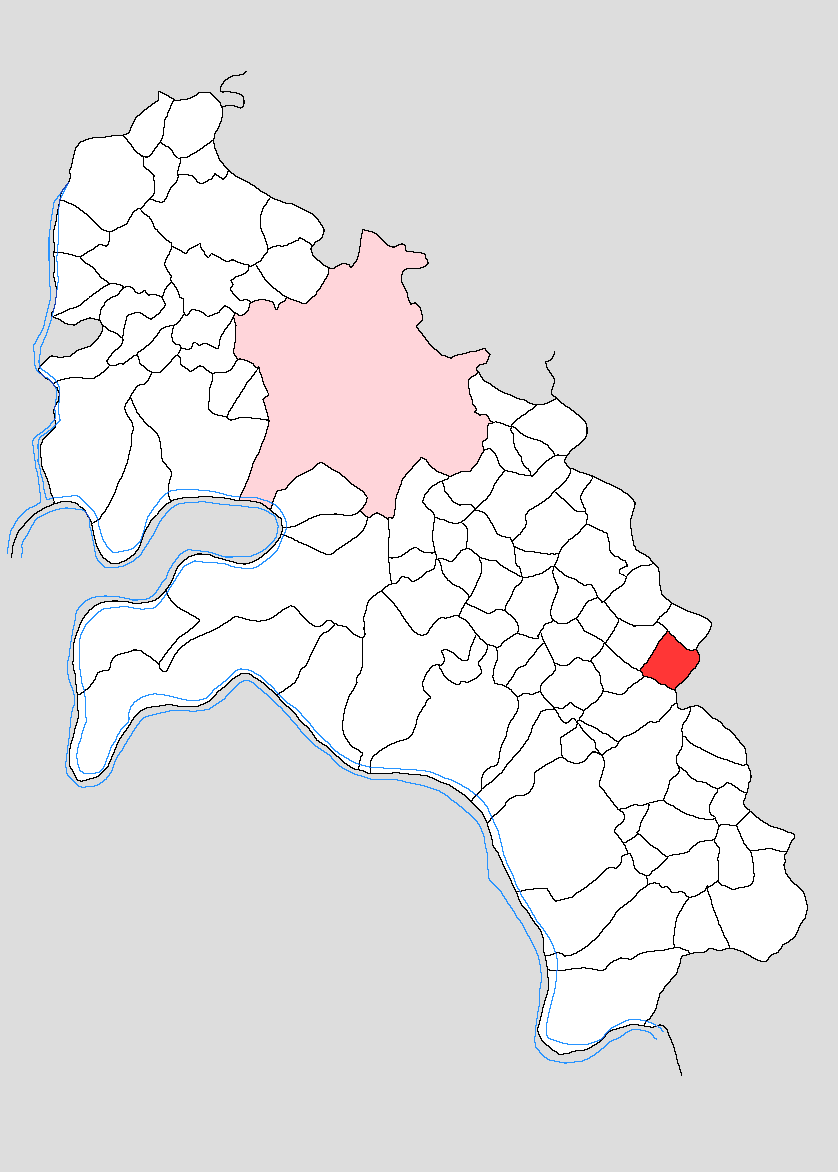
- Map showing Undani in Firozabad block

- Location in Uttar Pradesh, India
- Coordinates: 27.0859°N 78.48667°E
- Country: India
- State: Uttar Pradesh
- District: Firozabad
- Tehsil: Firozabad

Area
  - Total: 1.507 km^{2} (0.582 sq mi)

Population (2011)
  - Total: 1,538
  - Density: 1,021/km^{2} (2,643/sq mi)
- Time zone: UTC+5:30 (IST)

Undani (Ūndanī) is a village in Firozabad block of Firozabad district, Uttar Pradesh. It is located southeast of Firozabad and south of the town of Makkhanpur. As of 2011, Undani had a population of 1,538, in 246 households.

== Geography ==
Undani is located southeast of Firozabad, right on the tehsil boundary with Shikohabad. The nearest town is Makkhanpur, about 3-4 km to the north. Level farmland surrounds Undani on all sides, and there is a prominent tank on the southeast side of the village.

== Demographics ==
As of 2011, Undani had a population of 1,538, in 246 households. This population was 53.8% male (828) and 46.2% female (710). The 0–6 age group numbered 262 (142 male and 120 female), making up 17.0% of the total population. 1,025 residents were members of Scheduled Castes, or 66.6% of the total.

The 1981 census recorded Undani as having a population of 1,035 people (594 male and 441 female), in 377 households and 376 physical houses.

The 1961 census recorded Undani as comprising 1 hamlet, with a total population of 925 people (502 male and 423 female), in 157 households and 105 physical houses. The area of the village was given as 372 acres.

== Infrastructure ==
As of 2011, Undani had 2 primary schools; it did not have any healthcare facilities. Drinking water was provided by hand pump and tube well/bore well; there were no public toilets. The village did not have a post office or public library; there was at least some access to electricity for all purposes. Streets were made of both kachcha and pakka materials.
