= Khemkaranpur, Firozabad =

Village in Uttar Pradesh, India

Khemkaranpur
- Village
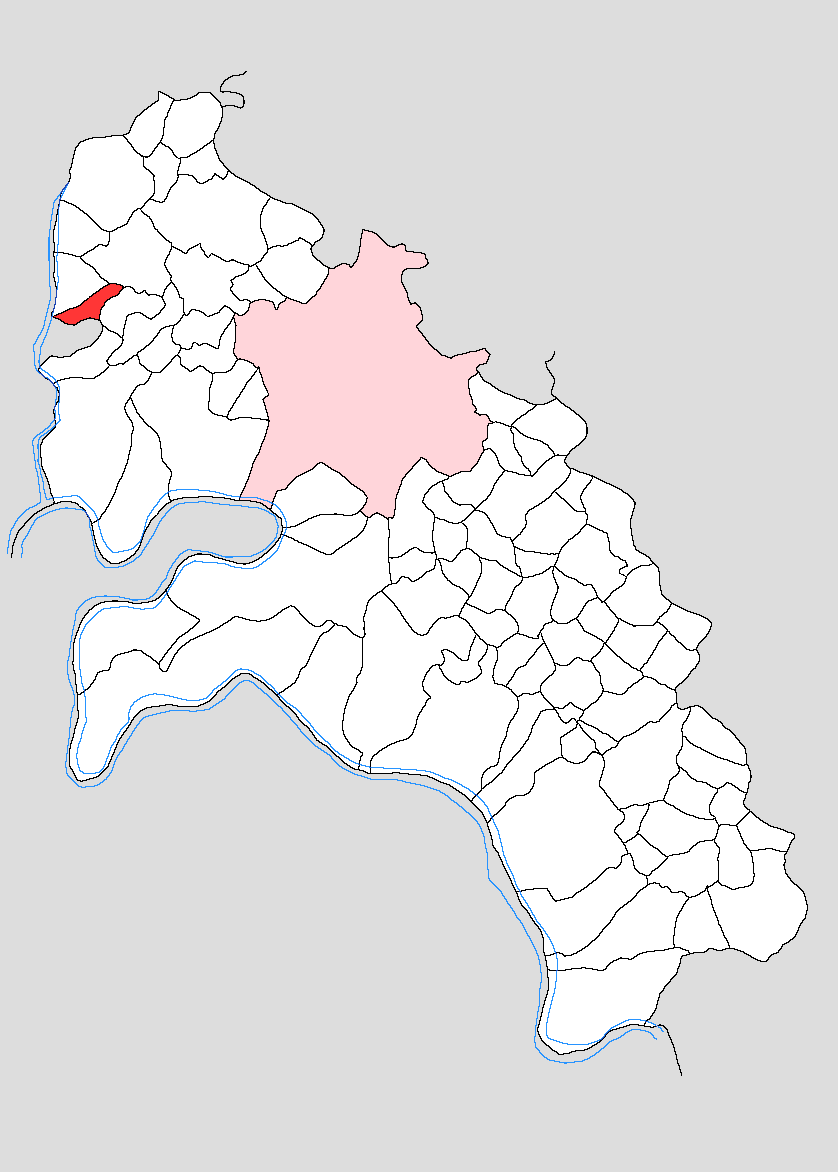
- Map showing Khemkaranpur in Firozabad block

- Location in Uttar Pradesh, India
- Coordinates: 27.17622°N 78.31224°E
- Country: India
- State: Uttar Pradesh
- District: Firozabad
- Tehsil: Firozabad

Area
  - Total: 1.033 km^{2} (0.399 sq mi)

Population (2011)
  - Total: 583
  - Density: 564/km^{2} (1,460/sq mi)
- Time zone: UTC+5:30 (IST)

Khemkaranpur (Khemkaranpur) is a small village in Firozabad block of Firozabad district, Uttar Pradesh. As of 2011, it had a population of 583, in 94 households.

== Geography ==
Khemkaranpur is located west of Firozabad, on the main line of the Northern Railway. The Hirangaon railway station is located in Khemkaranpur, although Hirangaon is actually a separate village to the northeast. The village of Ulau is also located just north of Khemkaranpur.

== Demographics ==
As of 2011, Khemkaranpur had a population of 583, in 94 households. This population was 52.7% male (307) and 47.3% female (276). The 0-6 age group numbered 103 (55 male and 48 female), making up 17.7% of the total population. 343 residents were members of Scheduled Castes, or 58.8% of the total.

The 1981 census recorded Khemkaranpur (here spelled as two words, "Khem Karanpur") as having a population of 472 people (280 male and 192 female), in 89 households and 89 physical houses.

The 1961 census recorded Khemkaranpur as comprising 1 hamlet, with a total population of 91 people (42 male and 49 female), in 16 households and 9 physical houses. The area of the village was given as 256 acres and it had a railway station at that point.

== Economy ==
The three most significant agricultural crops produced at Khemkaranpur are barley, potato, and mustard. There is also a prominent glass factory in the village.

== Infrastructure ==
As of 2011, Khemkaranpur had 1 primary school; it did not have any healthcare facilities. Drinking water was provided by hand pump; there were no public toilets. The village did not have a post office or public library; there was at least some access to electricity for all purposes. Streets were made of both kachcha and pakka materials.
