= Jahangirpur, Firozabad =

Village in Uttar Pradesh, India

Jahangirpur
- Village
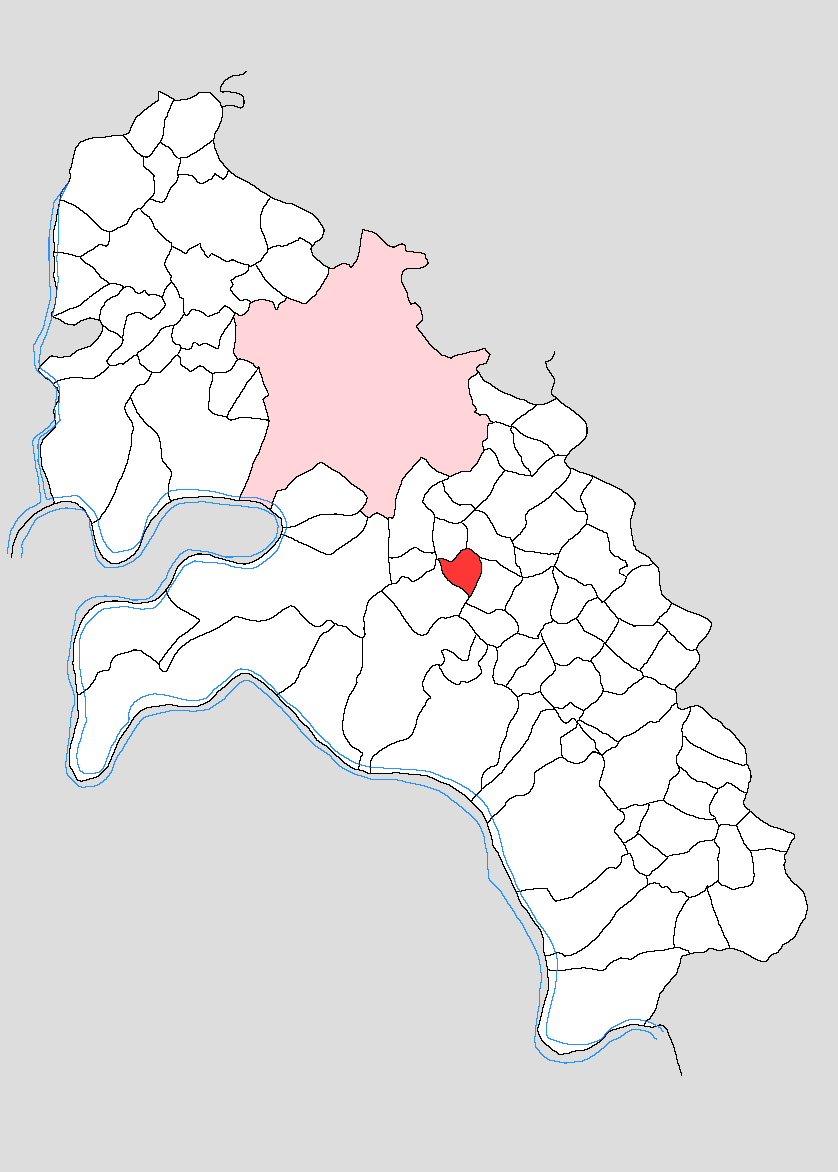
- Map showing Jahangirpur in Firozabad block

- Location in Uttar Pradesh, India
- Coordinates: 27.0419°N 78.6301°E
- Country: India
- State: Uttar Pradesh
- District: Firozabad
- Tehsil: Firozabad

Area
  - Total: 1.002 km^{2} (0.387 sq mi)

Population (2011)
  - Total: 924
  - Density: 922/km^{2} (2,390/sq mi)
- Time zone: UTC+5:30 (IST)

Jahangirpur (Jahāṃgīrpur) is a village in Firozabad block of Firozabad district, Uttar Pradesh. As of 2011, it had a population of 972, in 140 households.

== Demographics ==
As of 2011, Jahangirpur had a population of 972, in 140 households. This population was 54.3% male (480) and 45.7% female (444). The 0–6 age group numbered 159 (84 male and 75 female), making up 16.4% of the total population. 177 residents were members of Scheduled Castes, or 18.2% of the total.

The 1981 census recorded Jahangirpur as having a population of 460 people (240 male and 220 female), in 88 households and 87 physical houses.

The 1961 census recorded Jahangirpur as comprising 1 hamlet, with a total population of 345 people (189 male and 156 female), in 70 households and 54 physical houses. The area of the village was given as 248 acres.

== Infrastructure ==
As of 2011, Jahangirpur had 1 primary school; it did not have any healthcare facilities. Drinking water was provided by hand pump; there were no public toilets. The village did not have a post office or public library; there was at least some access to electricity for all purposes. Streets were made of both kachcha and pakka materials.
