= Chandwar =

Village in Uttar Pradesh, India

- Village
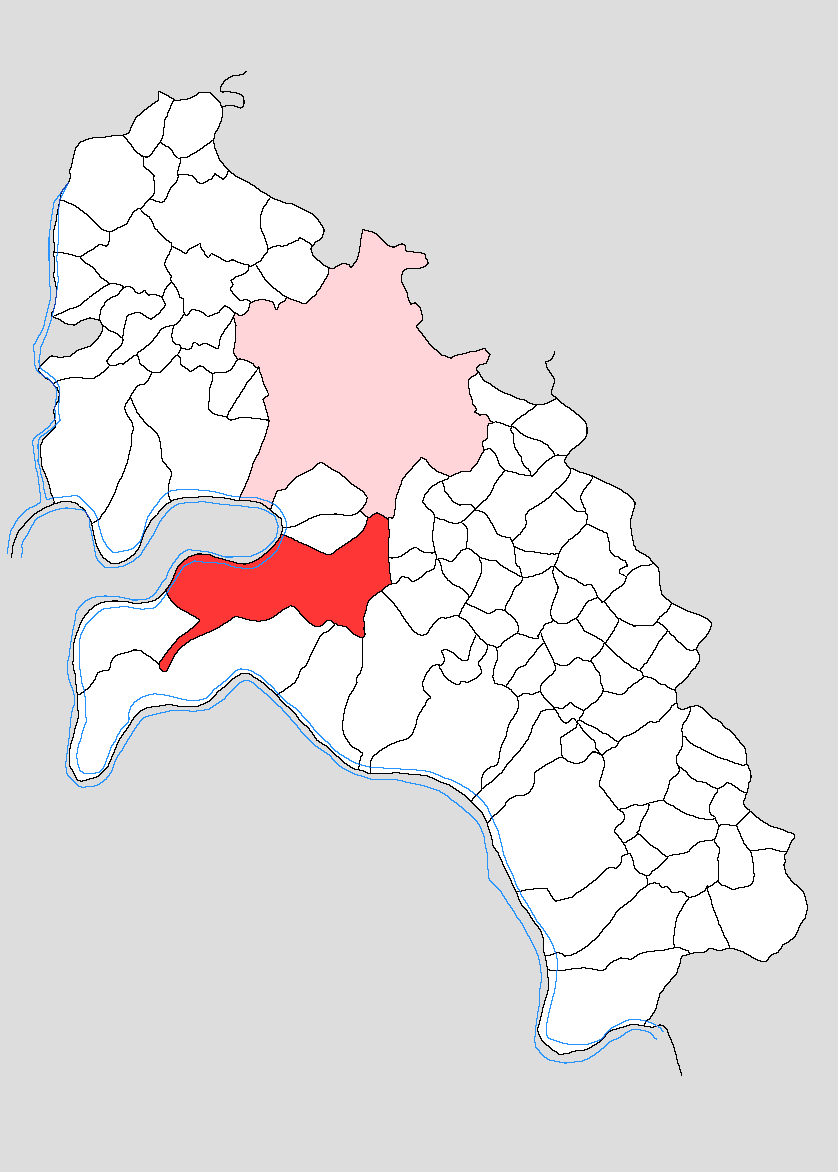
- Map showing Chandwar in Firozabad block

- Location in Uttar Pradesh, India
- Coordinates: 27.1069°N 78.37033°E
- Country: India
- State: Uttar Pradesh
- District: Firozabad
- Tehsil: Firozabad

Area
  - Total: 17.288 km^{2} (6.675 sq mi)

Population (2011)
  - Total: 12,004
  - Density: 694.35/km^{2} (1,798.4/sq mi)
- Time zone: UTC+5:30 (IST)

Chandwar (Chandwār) is a village in Firozabad block of Firozabad district, Uttar Pradesh, India. Although now a humble village, it was historically the main town in the region during the Middle Ages. As of 2011, it had a population of 12,004, in 2,101 households.

== Geography ==
Chandwar is located on the left bank of the Yamuna river, about 5 km southwest of Firozabad. The village lands cover a large area, much of which is cut up by bluffs and ravines. There are also 474 hectares of forest cover on the village lands.

== History ==
Before Firozabad was founded c. 1566, Chandwar was the main town in the area. It was supposedly a stronghold of the Chauhan Dynasty in the early medieval period; according to their dynastic traditions, the place was founded by a ruler named Chandrasen. According to Zahoor Ali Khan, based on the distribution of contemporary copper plate inscriptions, Chandwar was probably under indirect Gahadavala control by the late 1100s: although nominally under their suzerainty, the late Gahadavala rulers seem to have "ceased exercising effective authority" over the region.

Indirect Gahadavala rule came to an end with the Battle of Chandwar in 1194. The Gahadavala ruler Jayachandra was killed in the battle, which helped "lay the foundation" for Muhammad of Ghor's subsequent conquest of much of northern India. (Minhaj-i Siraj is the one who identifies Chandwar as the site of the battle. Ibn Asir only says that the battle took place near the Yamuna.

According to Bhadauria dynastic traditions, the presumed Chauhan local rulers of Chandwar stayed in power until 1246, when they were finally conquered. This may be corroborated by the Sultanate's own records, which mention the capture of an unnamed Hindu stronghold in that same year. Much later, shortly after Khizr Khan came to power in Delhi, his general Taj ul-Mulk was recorded receiving submission from "the infidels of Chandwar"; then in 1420, Taj ul-Mulk sacked and looted Chandwar as punishment of some sort. In 1452, Chandwar was the site of a major battle between the Delhi and Jaunpur Sultanates, which led to a three-year truce between the two empires.

Chandwar was listed in the Ain-i Akbari (c. 1595) as a mahal under sarkar Agra. It was listed with an assessed revenue of 11,442,250dams and was expected to supply 7,000 infantry and 200 cavalry to the Mughal army. It was described as having a brick fort on the Yamuna, and the Chauhans were listed as a prominent local group.

Chandwar seems to have remained the seat of a pargana until administrative reforms in the mid-1700s under Suraj Mal, the Jat maharaja of Bharatpur. It was then split between the new parganas of Khandauli and Firozabad.

== Monuments ==
There are many old monuments at Chandwar, mostly now in ruins. The old fort overlooking the Yamuna was once the political centre of the town, and there are also various ruined temples, mosques, and tombs. To the north of the village, on a bluff overlooking the river, is the tomb of the 16th-century Muslim holy man Shah Sufi (after whom the neighbouring village of Sufipur is named). This tomb is still in good condition and hosts an annual fair on the anniversary of Shah Sufi's death.

== Demographics ==
As of 2011, Chandwar had a population of 12,004, in 2,101 households. This population was 53.2% male (6,391) and 46.8% female (5,613). The 0-6 age group numbered 2,490 (1,319 male and 1,171 female), making up 20.7% of the total population. 40 residents were members of Scheduled Castes, or 0.3% of the total.

The 1981 census recorded Chandwar as having a population of 5,433 people (2,876 male and 2,557 female), in 815 households and 811 physical houses.

The 1961 census recorded Chandwar as comprising nine hamlets, with a total population of 3,393 people (1,760 male and 1,633 female), in 605 households and 418 physical houses. The area of the village was given as 4,269 acres and it had a post office at that point.

== Economy ==
As of 2011, Chandwar did not have a bank or agricultural credit society, and it did not host a weekly haat or permanent market. The primary agricultural crops grown at Chandwar are wheat, barley, and mustard.

== Infrastructure ==
As of 2011, Chandwar had two primary schools and one primary health sub centre. Drinking water was provided by well, hand pump, and tube well/borehole; there were no public toilets. The village had a sub post office but no public library; there was at least some access to electricity for all purposes. Streets were made of both kachcha and pakka materials.
