= Firozabad =

- Town
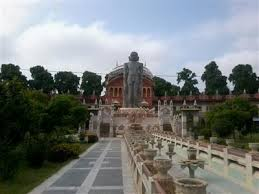
- Mahavir Digambar Jain temple of Firozabad, Uttar Pradesh

- Location within Uttar Pradesh Location within India
- Coordinates: 27°9′23.823″N 78°23′45.963″E
- Country: India
- State: Uttar Pradesh
- District: Firozabad

Government
  - Type: Municipal Corporation
  - Body: Firozabad Municipal Corporation
  - Member of Parliament (MP): Shri Akshay Yadav Ji (SP)
  - Mayor: Kamini Rathore (BJP)
  - Member of Legislative Council (MLC): Dr. Dilip Yadav (SP)
  - District Magistrate: IAS

Area
  - Total: 35.49 km^{2} (13.70 sq mi)

Population (2011 census)
  - Total: 603,797
  - Density: 17,010/km^{2} (44,060/sq mi)

Languages
  - Official: Hindi; Urdu
- Time zone: UTC+5:30 (IST)
- PIN: 283203
- Telephone code: 05612
- Vehicle registration: UP-83
- Website: firozabad.nic.in

Firozabad (Hindustani pronunciation: [fɪɾoːzaːbaːd̪]) is a city near Agra in Firozabad district in the state of Uttar Pradesh in India. It is the centre of India's glassmaking industry and is known for the quality of the bangles and glassware produced here.

During the reign of Akbar, revenue was brought through the city, which was looted by the Afghans. Akbar sent his army led by the Mansab Dar, Firoz Shah, to make the city a cantonment to collect taxes and the city of Chandrawar was renamed as Firozabad after him. The tomb of Firoz Shah is located in the city. From early times, it had glass and bangle works, and small scale industry. The landowners of Firozabad hail from the Siddiqui, Sayed, Manihar, Pathan and the Hindu Rajput castes. Firozabad is located in north central India, in Uttar Pradesh, 44 km (27 mi) from Agra, 22 km (14 mi) from Shikohabad, 88 km (55 mi) from Etawah and around 274 km (170 mi) from New Delhi via Yamuna Expressway at the northern edge of the Deccan Plateau, at 27°09′N 78°24′E. It is located 164 metres (538 ft) above sea level.

The boundaries of Firozabad district touch Etah district in north and Mainpuri and Etawah districts in the east. The Yamuna river makes its southern boundary.

== History ==
The city lies in the cultural region of Braj and was a part of the Surasena Mahajanapada during the Vedic Age. It was subsequently ruled by the bigger kingdoms including the Mauryas, Guptas, Indo-Scythians, Kushans, Indo-Greeks, Harsha before falling into the hands of Brahmin Peshwa, Rajput rulers.

Before the foundation of modern Firozabad, the main city in the area was at Chandwar, on the left bank of the Yamuna a short distance southwest of Firozabad. Chandwar, a stronghold of the Chauhan Rajputs from an early date, was founded by a ruler named Chandrasen according to tradition. Chandwar was conquered several times by the Delhi Sultanate, but its Chauhan rulers seem to have repeatedly asserted their independence over a period of several centuries. One tradition holds that the final defeat of the king Jayachandra by Muhammad of Ghor took place here, at the Battle of Chandwar. According to family traditions of the Bhadaurias, another conquest of Chandwar happened in 1246AD, which may be corroborated by the records kept by the Sultanate, which mention the capture of an unnamed Hindu stronghold in that same year. Shortly after his ascension in 1351, Delhi Sultan Firoz Shah Tughlaq ordered the construction of a fort in the Chandwar region which he named after himself however the fort soon fell into decay after his death and was subsequently abandoned. Then, after the Delhi Sultan Khizr Khan came to power in 1414, his general Taj ul-Mulk received submission from "the infidels of Chandwar" and then, in 1420, he sacked and looted Chandwar as punishment of some sort. In 1452, Chandwar was the site of a major battle between the Delhi and Jaunpur Sultanates, which led to a three-year truce between the two empires.

The modern city of Firozabad was founded c. 1566, when Raja Todar Mal was returning from a pilgrimage to Gaya and stopped at the village of Asafabad (just southeast of modern Firozabad). The villagers insulted him, and when the emperor Akbar heard of this, he sent the eunuch Firoz Khwaja to demolish the town and build a new one. The city was built on lands belonging to several neighboring villages, including Akbarabad, Sukhmalpur, Muhammadpur-Gajmalpur, Rasulpur, and Pempur-Raipur, and it was named Firozabad in honor of its founder. Firoz Khwaja's tomb, built of white marble, is by the road to Agra.

Mr. Peter, a businessman working for the Dutch East India Company visited Firozabad on 9 August 1632, and found the town in good condition. It is written in the gazetteer of Agra and Mathura that in 1596 Faraz was upgraded to a pargana. Faraz was bestowed to Nawab Sadulla Khan as jagir, in the regime of Shahjahan. Jahangir ruled here from 1605 to 1627. Etawah, Budaun, Mainpuri, Faraz were under first class mansabdar of emperor Farrukhsiar. Baji Rao I looted Firozabad and Etmadpur in 1737 in the regime of Mohammad Shah. Jats of Mahawan attacked Faujdar Hakim Kajim ali bahadur jang at Firozabad and killed him on 9 May 1739. Jats ruled Firozabad for 30 years. Gajuddin, Hidayat Vaksh son of Alamgir second his nephew and Mirza baba the son in law, came to Firozabad. Mirza Nabab Khan stayed here until 1782. In the end of the 18th century, Firozabad was ruled by Himmat Bahadur with co-operation of Marathas. The French Army chief of Marathas, D. Wayan, established an ordnance factory in November 1794. Mr. Thomas Traving also mentioned this fact in his book Travels in India. Marathas appointed his subedar Lakwadads here who made a fort near old tehsil, known at present as garie.

General Lek and General Vellajally attacked Firozabad in 1802. In the beginning of British regime Firozabad was in Etawah district but after some time it was attached to Aligarh district. When Sadabad was created as a new district in 1832, Firozabad was attached to it. Later on, in 1833 Firozabad was attached to Agra district. In 1847, the business of lac was flourishing at Firozabad.

In 1857, Zamindar of Firozabad with local public took active parts in freedom struggle. Urdu poet Munir Shikohabadi was sentenced to Kala pani by the British East India Company. People of this city took part in "Khilafat Movement", "Quit India Movement", and "Namak Satyagrah" and went to the jail during these national movements. In 1929, Father of Nation Mahatma Gandhi, in 1935 Khan Abdul Ghaffar Khan, in 1937 Pandit Jawahar Lal Nehru and in 1940 Subhas Chandra Bose visited Pandit Banarasi Das Chaturvedi, a two time member of Parliament - said to be the father of Hindi Journalism and the recipient of Padma Bushan.

== Local Administration ==
Firozabad district was finally established on 5 February 1989.

The Firozabad Nagar Palika Parishad was elevated to Nagar Nigam (municipal corporation) by the Uttar Pradesh state government in 2014. Prashant Nagar is the Commissioner of the Firozabad Municipal Corporation.

== Geography ==
Firozabad is located at 27.15°N 78.42°E. The Yamuna river flows past Firozabad a few kilometers to the south in a heavily meandering course. The area around Firozabad itself is a level plain, but to the south, the area along the Yamuna is rugged and broken up by many ravines. On the southern outskirts of town, there is a small stream called the Ganda Nala, which flows south to the Yamuna.

The main line of the Northern Railway passes through Firozabad on the south side. A stretch of the old NH 2 runs through Firozabad, going northwest toward Delhi and southeast toward Kolkata. Several large country roads also fan out from the north side of town, including one going northwest to Jalesar and another going northeast to Kotla. The Firozabad Distributary canal goes along the northern and eastern outskirts of the city, and a major city road follows its course from near Kakrau in the northwest to Asafabad at the southeast corner of the built-up area.

Besides Kakrau and Asafabad, Firozabad's built-up area includes localities such as Lalpur (north of Asafabad), Dakhal and Tapa Kalan (on the north side of town, between the Jalesar and Kotla roads), Nagla Bhao and Rahna (on the northwest side of town), and Humayunpur (on the west along the old NH 2). Several major factories are located on the northwest side of town, along the highway west of Nagla Bhao and Humayunpur.

== Climate ==
The lowest recorded temperature in Firozabad was −1 °C (30 °F) and the highest was 48 °C (118 °F).

Climate data for Firozabad
Month	Jan	Feb	Mar	Apr	May	Jun	Jul	Aug	Sep	Oct	Nov	Dec	Year
Mean daily maximum °C (°F)	22 (72)	25 (77)	32 (90)	38 (100)	41 (106)	41 (106)	35 (95)	33 (91)	34 (93)	34 (93)	29 (84)	24 (75)	32 (90)
Mean daily minimum °C (°F)	8 (46)	10 (50)	16 (61)	22 (72)	26 (79)	28 (82)	27 (81)	26 (79)	24 (75)	19 (66)	13 (55)	9 (48)	19 (66)
Average precipitation mm (inches)	10.2 (0.40)	12.7 (0.50)	10.2 (0.40)	10.2 (0.40)	15.2 (0.60)	66.0 (2.60)	195.6 (7.70)	226.1 (8.90)	114.3 (4.50)	27.9 (1.10)	2.5 (0.10)	5.1 (0.20)	696 (27.4)
Source: Firozabad Weather

Firozabad has been ranked 1st best “National Clean Air City” under (Category 2 3-10L Population cities) in India according to 'Swachh Vayu Survekshan 2024 Results'

== Demographics ==
Religions in Firozabad City (2011)
Religion	Percent
Hinduism	62.36%
Islam	33.80%
Jainism	1.76%
Other or not stated	2.08%

As of 2011 India census, Firozabad City had a population of 603,797. Males constitute 53% of the population and females 47%. Firozabad has an average literacy rate of 75.01% higher than the national average of 74%: male literacy is 85.32%, and female literacy is 63%. In Firozabad, 16% of the population is under 6 years of age. Scheduled Castes and Scheduled Tribes make up 16.55% and 0.39% of the population respectively.

Languages in Firozabad (2011)
1. Hindi (90.8%)
2. Urdu (9.03%)
3. Others (0.14%)

The city lies in the cultural region of Braj and the local language is Brajbhasha.

== Economy ==
=== Municipal finance ===
As per the Ministry of Housing and Urban Affairs, the Firozabad Municipal Corporation reported a revenue of ₹123 crore (US$15 million) and an expenditure of ₹127 crore (US$15 million) in 2022–23. Taxes contributed to 7.3% of the revenue, while the corporation received ₹107 crore in grants during the year.

=== Glass industry ===
Firozabad is the largest glass manufacturing centre in India, accounting for about 70% of the total glass production in the unorganised sector in India. It is estimated that over 50% of the city's population is employed "directly or indirectly" in the glass industry, with bangle manufacturing alone employing about 100,000 people. (Note: About 82,000 are stated to be employed in "micro-units", doing post-production work on bangles such as straightening, joining, cutting, and decorating, but the source does not specify if this represents the entire number of people employed in bangle manufacturing.) Firozabad is the single largest producer of bangles in India, accounting for 46% of India's total production. Other products include things like glass tableware, laboratory glassware, glass containers, automotive glass, vases, chandeliers, and numerous decorative items. As of 2011, the total production capacity of finished glass items in Firozabad is about 1,230 tonnes per day. The percent of this that gets exported internationally is variously estimated to be about 35% or about 50%. As of 2011, the total annual revenue from Firozabad's glass industry was Rs. 23.26 billion.

Working conditions for Firozabad glassworkers are often very poor. Workers are often forced to work 12-to-14-hour days or risk losing their jobs, workplace injuries are common, and the intense heat in glass furnaces often causes dehydration and heat exhaustion in workers, who often then have to borrow money for medical treatment. As of 1986, it was reported that the combination of heat, dust, and noise led to tuberculosis being widespread, and the average lifespan of glassworkers was reduced by 10 to 15 years. Child labour is also very common, with Neera Burra estimating that almost 50,000 children under the age of 14 were working in glass production in Firozabad as of 1986.

== Transport ==
Firozabad railway station served by the Delhi-Howrah trunk route of the Indian Railways. Several trains serve the city connecting it to long and short distanced destinations including New Delhi, Howrah, Mumbai, Kanpur, Lucknow, Jaipur, Jammu Tawi, Amritsar, Jamshedpur, Patna, Aligarh, Agra, Hathras, Puri, Ajmer, Ambala, Bareilly, Mathura, Etawah, Basti, Gorakhpur and Tundla.

Tundla Junction railway station in the Tundla town (20 km west of Firozabad city on National Highway 2) of the Firozabad District is a major railway station of North Central Railways. Due to its proximity to Agra several trains on the Delhi Howrah route which don't stop at Firozabad station make a stop at Tundla Junction hence serving Firozabad as well as Agra cities.

- 20801/02 Magadh Express
- 14217/18 Unchahar Express
- 15483/84 Sikkim Mahananda Express
- 12311/12 Kalka Mail
- 12419/20 Gomti Express
- 14163/64 Sangam Express
- 13483/84 Farakka Express
- 15707/08 Amrapali Express
- 14723/24 Kalindi Express
- 12875/76 Neelachal Express
- 12395/96 Ziyarat Express
- 12179/08 Lucknow Intercity Express

The city is 45 km (28 mi) east from Agra on National Highway 19 which makes it an important stopover for the transport vehicles on this highway. Firozabad hence is connected to several bus services to the Western and Eastern parts of Uttar Pradesh state. Due to proximity to Agra and hence the borders of Uttar Pradesh with Rajasthan, Madhya Pradesh states several inter-state bus services also serve the city. Intra-city transport typically consists of Rickshaws and 3-wheelers

The city is well connected with Yamuna Expressway and Taj Expressway to national capital New Delhi and state capital Lucknow respectively.

== Water pollution ==
Since few years, Firozabad has been suffering with a severe water pollution problem. The water has been polluted by the indiscriminate discharge of wastes by the industries. The water has been rendered practically unusable. Citizens have no option but to install water purifiers at home and use packaged drinking water for consumption.

== Tourist attractions ==
=== Lord Bahubali Jain Temple ===
In Suhag Nagari, holy center of "Jain Nagar" was established by Lt. Seth Chhadamilal. The temple has a 45-foot granite idol of Bahubali, the largest in North India, weighing more than 3500 tonnes. There are many Jain temples near this temple.

== Villages ==
The following 89 villages are counted as part of Firozabad CD block:

1. Alampur Anandipur
2. Alampur Jarkhi
3. Alampur Kaneta
4. Alinagar Kenjra
5. Allahdadpur
6. Anandipur Karkauli
7. Aquil Pur Damodarpur
8. Bendi
9. Balchandpur
10. Baramai
11. Barkatpur
12. Basai Muhammadpur
13. Basdeopur
14. Bazidpur Kutubpur
15. Bhikan Pur Sadasukh
16. Bhikanpur Annadipur
17. Bhondela
18. Bijaipur Bhikanpur
19. Bijaipur Nagla Bhaosingh
20. Bilahna
21. Chandwar
22. Daragpur
23. Datauli
24. Dhakpura
25. Donkeli
26. Fatehpur Anandipur
27. Garhi Chhatrapat
28. Ghazipur
29. Gudun
30. Hamirpura
31. Hardaspur Nisfi
32. Hirangaon
33. Itora
34. Jahangirpur
35. Jaindamai
36. Jalalpur
37. Jalupura
38. Jamalpur
39. Jarauli Kalan
40. Jarauli Khurd
41. Khagerai
42. Khalilganj
43. Kharsoli
44. Khemkaranpur
45. Khera Ganeshpur
46. Kinharpur
47. Kolamai
48. Kurri Kupa
49. Ladupur Chakarpur
50. Lalau
51. Latura
52. Luhari
53. Mandua
54. Matamai
55. Matsena
56. Milikhan Jahanpur
57. Mondha
58. Muhammadpur Biharipur
59. Nagau
60. Naglamulla
61. Nagria
62. Nanpi Pithni
63. Nargapur
64. Nasirpur
65. Nurpur Kutubpur
66. Paharpur
67. Pharaul Nagaria
68. Phulaichi
69. Pilua
70. Prempur Anandipur
71. Ranipur
72. Rashidpur Kaneta
73. Rupaspur
74. Salempur Anandipur
75. Salempur Nagla Khar
76. Saragawan
77. Saramai
78. Satkai
79. Sengai
80. Shankarpur
81. Sherpur Anandipur
82. Sikahra Hardaspur
83. Sufipur
84. Ulau
85. Undani
86. Usaini
87. Usmanpur
88. Wazirpur Anandipur
89. Wazirpur Jihalpur
