= Araul =

Araul Aroul
- Town
- Location in Kanpur, Uttar Pradesh, India Araul (India)
- Coordinates: 26.921°N 80.019°E
- Country: India
- State: Uttar Pradesh
- District: Kanpur Nagar

Area
  - Total: 4 km^{2} (1.5 sq mi)

Languages
  - Official: Hindi
- Time zone: UTC+5:30 (IST)
- PIN: 209202
- Telephone code: Code-05112
- Vehicle registration: UP-78
- Website: up.gov.in

Araul (also known as Aroul) is a town in Bilhaur tehsil in Kanpur district in the state of Uttar Pradesh, India on G.T. Road (NH 91) and situated at bank of the holy river Ganga. It is 11 km from Town Bilhaur. Araul is located 62 km distance from its District Main City Kanpur and 15 km distance from Kannauj. It is located 92 km distance from capital of Uttar Pradesh (U.P.) Lucknow. Gangupur is nearest Semi Town (Village)

== General information ==
- Agriculture (Specially for Potato), business and animal husbandry are important to the local economy.
- There are three Inter colleges Nehru Vidhyalay Inter College (NVIC), Vidhya Bhawan Inter College and Kanya Vidhyalay Girls Inter College. There are two higher education centers DR. G.P.R.D. Patel Institute of Technology and Management and Maa Sheetla Devi Trijugi Narayan Mahila Mahavidyalaya.
- It is also a cold storage hub of potatoes. And other schools are Adarsh Vidhyalay, Swaroop Narayan Memorial Shiksha Niketan Gangupur, Araul, Kanpur.

== Reaching Araul ==
Araul is well connected by rail (Araul Makanpur Railway Station (ARL)) and located at the national highway GT road (NH 91). It is about 65 km from Kanpur City and 15 km from Kannauj City. Araul is an important pilgrim township in Kanpur District and close to Gangupur and Kannauj District border.

Nearest Railway Station-

- Bilhaur Railway Station is 11 km away.
- Gangwapur Railway Station is 4 km away.
- Kannauj Railway Station is 15 km away.

Nearest airport is C A Kanpur Airport.

Nearby Cities and Towns: Bilhaur (11 km), Gangupur (4 km), Kannauj (15 km), Makanpur (5 km), Bagarmau, Tirwa, Shivrajpur (27.6 km) Chaubeypur (35.8 km), Kanpur (62 km).

Nearby Villages: Bheeteehaveli, Medua, Khadamau, Gangupur, Ankin, Sheshpur Dharmshala, Gujepur, Halpura, Bawan Jhala Muzaffarpur, Gajana, Akbarpur Senga, Anei, Hilalpur, Baranda, Pihani Majboot Nagar, Makanpur, Mahadewa, Dhaurahara, Saraiya Bhoor, Kharamau.

== makna devi(Araul Makanpur) ==
Araul-Makanpur is famous for a shrine of ' who came to India in the 13th century and became popular as Makna devi एंड (Madar Sharif) among his believers. The annual fair observed every year (Every Basant Panchmi, Animal fair at his mausoleum is quite popular. Famous quotes on Makna devi

== Jungleshur Baba Temple ==
Jungleshur Baba Temple is an oldest and famous temple of Lord Shiva. It is 2 km away from town of Araul and 2 km away from Gangupur. It is situated on G.T. Road (National Highway 91).

== Geography ==
Araul has an average elevation of 127 meters (419 feet).
