= Kati Kui =

- Village
- Location in Kanpur, Uttar Pradesh, India Kati Kui (India)
- Coordinates: 26.91°N 80.02°E
- Country: India
- State: Uttar Pradesh
- District: Kanpur Nagar

Population (2011 Census of India)
  - Total: 6,100

Languages
  - Official: Hindi
- Time zone: UTC+5:30 (IST)
- PIN: 209202
- Vehicle registration: UP-78

Kati Kui is a village in Birthi Haveli Gram panchayat in Bilhaur Tehsil, Kanpur Nagar district, Uttar Pradesh, India. Its village code is 149915.
