= Katari Bohnar =

- Village
- Location in Kanpur, Uttar Pradesh, India Katari Bohnar (India)
- Coordinates: 26.88°N 80.09°E
- Country: India
- State: Uttar Pradesh
- District: Kanpur Nagar

Population (2011 Census of India)
  - Total: 1,120

Languages
  - Official: Hindi
- Time zone: UTC+5:30 (IST)
- PIN: 209202
- Vehicle registration: UP-78

Dadikha is a village in Dadikha Gram panchayat, Bilhaur Tehsil, Kanpur Nagar district, Uttar Pradesh, India. It is located 67 km away from Kanpur City. According to 2011 Census of India the total population of the village is 1,120, out of 612 are males and 508 are females.
