= Madarpur (Bilhaur) =

- Village
- Location in Kanpur, Uttar Pradesh, India Madarpur (India)
- Coordinates: 26.87°N 79.97°E
- Country: India
- State: Uttar Pradesh
- District: Kanpur Nagar

Population (2011 Census of India)
  - Total: 566

Languages
  - Official: Hindi
- Time zone: UTC+5:30 (IST)
- PIN: 209202
- Vehicle registration: UP-78

Madarpur is a village in Dewkali Bilhaur Gram panchayat in Bilhaur Tehsil, Kanpur Nagar district, Uttar Pradesh, India. Its village code is 149892. As per 2011 Census of India report the population of the village is 566 where 298 are men and 268 are women.
