= Saraiya (disambiguation) =

Saraiya may refer to:

== People ==
- Priya Saraiya
- Rajesh Saraiya
- Jigar Saraiya
- Saraiya (actress)

== Places ==
- Saraiya
- Saraiya, Mainpuri
- Barki Saraiya
- Shankar Saraiya
- List of villages in Saraiya block
- Saraiya, Barhara
- Saraiya Bhoor

== Other ==
- Saraiya Goyō
