= Musahebpur =

- Village
- Location in Kanpur, Uttar Pradesh, India Musahebpur (India)
- Coordinates: 26.81°N 80.07°E
- Country: India
- State: Uttar Pradesh
- District: Kanpur Nagar

Population (2011 Census of India)
  - Total: 648

Languages
  - Official: Hindi
- Time zone: UTC+5:30 (IST)
- PIN: 209202
- Vehicle registration: UP-78

Musahebpur is a village in Chaubi Gahi Shikohabad Gram panchayat in Bilhaur Tehsil, Kanpur Nagar district, Uttar Pradesh, India. It is located 60 km away from Kanpur City. According to 2011 Census of India population of the village is 648.
