= Nargapur =

Village in Uttar Pradesh, India

- Village
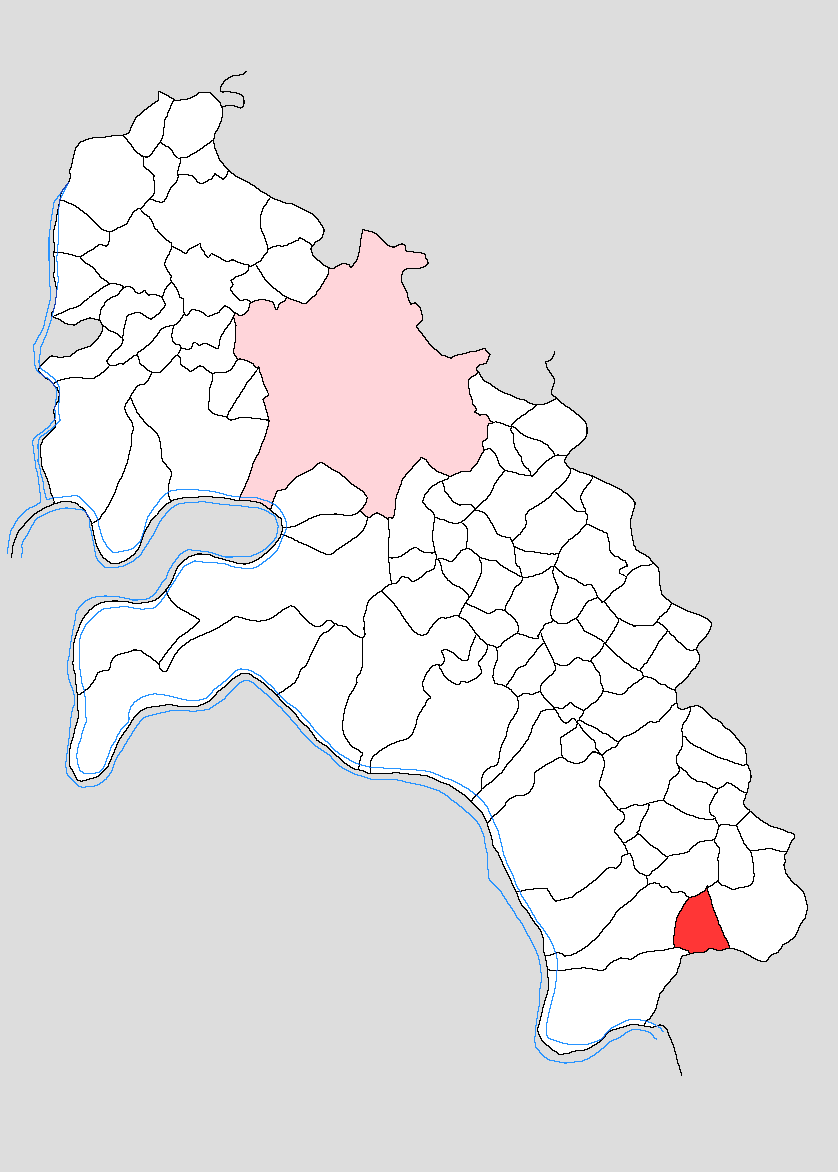
- Map showing Nargapur in Firozabad block

- Location in Uttar Pradesh, India
- Coordinates: 27.02223°N 78.49501°E
- Country: India
- State: Uttar Pradesh
- District: Firozabad
- Tehsil: Firozabad

Area
  - Total: 2.148 km^{2} (0.829 sq mi)

Population (2011)
  - Total: 1,620
  - Density: 754/km^{2} (1,950/sq mi)
- Time zone: UTC+5:30 (IST)
- PIN: 283203

Nargapur (Nargāpur) is a village in Firozabad block of Firozabad district, Uttar Pradesh. It is located southeast of Firozabad, close to the tehsil boundary with Shikohabad. As of 2011, it had a population of 1,620, in 273 households.

== Geography ==
Nargapur is located well to the southeast of Firozabad, close to the tehsil boundary with Shikohabad. The surrounding terrain is basically all level farmland. There is a prominent tank just to the north of the village. The village of Datauli is located about 2 km to the east of Nargapur, and the village of Hardaspur Nisfi is about 1 km to the north. Somewhat farther away are Allahdadpur to the southwest, Sikahra Hardaspur to the west, and Sengai to the northwest.

== Demographics ==
As of 2011, Nargapur had a population of 1,620, in 273 households. This population was 55.5% male (889) and 44.5% female (721). The 0–6 age group numbered 234 (114 male and 120 female), making up 14.4% of the total population. 23 residents were members of Scheduled Castes, or 1.4% of the total.

The 1981 census recorded Nargapur as having a population of 961 people (509 male and 452 female), in 162 households and 160 physical houses.

The 1961 census recorded Nargapur as comprising 2 hamlets, with a total population of 645 people (358 male and 287 female), in 108 households and 85 houses. The area of the village was given as 534 acres.

== Infrastructure ==
As of 2011, Nargapur had 1 primary school; it did not have any healthcare facilities. Drinking water was provided by tap, hand pump, and tube well/bore well; there were no public toilets. The village did not have a post office or public library; there was at least some access to electricity for residential and agricultural (but not commercial) purposes. Streets were made of both kachcha and pakka materials.
