= List of cities in Uttar Pradesh by population =

The Indian state of Uttar Pradesh borders with Nepal and the Indian states of Bihar, Jharkhand, Chhattisgarh, Madhya Pradesh, Rajasthan, Haryana, Uttarakhand, Himachal Pradesh and National Capital Territory of Delhi. The Himalayas lies in the north of the state and the Deccan Plateau is at the south. In between them, the river Ganges, Yamuna and Sarayu (ghaghra) flow eastwards. Uttar Pradesh can be divided into two distinct regions, Southern hills and Gangetic plain. Uttar Pradesh is divided into 75 districts under 18 divisions. As of 2011, with an estimated population of 199,581,477. Uttar Pradesh is the most populous state in India. Uttar Pradesh occupies 6.88 per cent of the India's land surface area but is home to 16.49 per cent of the India's population. As of 2011, 64 cities in the state had a population of over 100,000 people. Kanpur is the largest city of Uttar Pradesh in terms of population whereas Lucknow is also the largest city of Uttar Pradesh in terms of area (as per municipal limits) covering an area of 631 km². The smallest city with a population over 100,000 people was Kasganj with a population of 101,241 people according to 2011 census figures.

== List ==
Locations of major cities in Uttar Pradesh

This list refers only to the population of individual municipalities within their defined limits; the populations of other municipalities considered suburbs or outgrowths of a central city are listed separately, and unincorporated areas within urban agglomerations are not included. Therefore, a different ranking is evident when considering metropolitan area population of India. The total geographical area of Uttar Pradesh is 240,928 square kilometres (93,023 sq mi). As per census data from 2011, the total population of Uttar Pradesh is 199,581,477.

Name	District	Type*	Category	Population as of 2011				Literacy Rate
Name	District	Type*	Category	Total	Male	Female	Children under 5 yrs	Literacy Rate
Kanpur	Kanpur	UA	Nagar Nigam	2,817,105	1,484,967	1,474,100	266,336	82
Lucknow	Lucknow	UA	Nagar Nigam	2,767,348	1,618,951	1,582,523	289,375	88.98
Ghaziabad	Ghaziabad	UA	Nagar Nigam	1,729,000	864,500	864,500	308,717	80
Agra	Agra	City	Nagar Nigam	1,585,704	1,042,441	963,402	210,036	78
Prayagraj	Prayagraj	City	Nagar Nigam	1,536,218	961,060	874,053	157,482	86.36
Meerut	Meerut	City	Nagar Nigam	1,226,709	6,54,857	5,70,051	176,770	78.29
Varanasi	Varanasi	City	Nagar Nigam	1,201,815	755,734	660,985	112,023	80.31
Bareilly	Bareilly	UA	Nagar Nigam	913,668	722,385	557,548	104,560	70.97
Aligarh	Aligarh	UA	Nagar Nigam	909,559	482,828	426,731	118,778	70.54
Moradabad	Moradabad	City	Nagar Nigam	889,810	466,432	432,378	110,376	70.65
Saharanpur	Saharanpur	City	Nagar Nigam	703,345	371,858	331,487	88,501	77.94
Gorakhpur	Gorakhpur	City	Nagar Nigam	692,519	365,148	327,371	65,078	85.64
Noida	Gautam Buddha Nagar	City	Nagar Nigam	642,381	320,482	321,899	63,567	88.58
Firozabad	Firozabad	City	Nagar Nigam	603,797	320,012	283,785	83,530	75.01
Jhansi	Jhansi	UA	Nagar Nigam	549,391	292,497	256,894	56,230	84.41
Muzaffarnagar	Muzaffarnagar	City	Nagar Palika	494,792	261,338	233,454	64,696	80.99
Mathura-Vrindavan	Mathura	UA	Nagar Nigam	454,937	244,333	210,604	56,267	77.11
Budaun	Badaun	UA	Nagar Palika	366,001	196,416	169,585	56,890	87.00
Rampur	Rampur	UA	Nagar Palika	359,062	182,325	166,737	41,769	69.56
Shahjahanpur	Shahjahanpur	UA	Nagar Nigam	356,103	183,087	163,016	38,736	79.81
Farrukhabad-Fatehgarh	Farrukhabad	City	Nagar Palika	318,540	164,630	145,910	39,944	75.60
Ayodhya	Ayodhya	UA	Nagar Palika	290,799	140,799	120,000	25,789	78.78
Maunath Bhanjan	Mau	City	Nagar Palika	279,060	143,273	135,787	40,651	78.60
Hapur	Hapur	City	Nagar Palika	262,801	139,694	123,107	36,714	75.34
Etawah	Etawah	City	Nagar Palika	256,790	135,829	120,961	28,922	82.89
Mirzapur-Vindhyachal	Mirzapur	UA	Nagar Palika	245,817	131,534	114,283	29,619	77.85
Bulandshahr	Bulandshahr	UA	Nagar Palika	235,310	125,549	111,761	30,886	78.37
Sambhal	Sambhal	City	Nagar Palika	221,334	116,008	105,326	34,279	49.51
Amroha	Amroha	City	Nagar Palika	198,471	102,804	94,331	26,855	63.88
Hardoi	Hardoi	UA	Nagar Palika	197,046	104,201	92,845	21,719	83.27
Fatehpur	Fatehpur	City	Nagar Palika	193,801	101,620	92,181	22,078	77.69
Raebareli	Raebareli	City	Nagar Palika	191,625	99,844	91,212	18,866	82.97
Orai	Jalaun	UA	Nagar Palika	190,625	101,434	89,191	20,424	83.35
Sitapur	Sitapur	UA	Nagar Palika	188,230	99,129	89,101	19,721	83.02
Bahraich	Bahraich	City	Nagar Palika	186,241	98,529	87,712	22,828	75.3
Modinagar	Ghaziabad	UA	Nagar Palika	182,811	97,335	85,476	21,441	87.03
Unnao	Unnao	City	Nagar Palika	178,681	94,080	84,601	18,604	83.72
Jaunpur	Jaunpur	City	Nagar Palika	168,128	88,704	79,424	18,033	82.11
Lakhimpur	Lakhimpur Kheri	UA	Nagar Palika	164,925	88,908	77,017	18,174	83.80
Hathras	Hathras	UA	Nagar Palika	161,289	86,028	75,261	20,279	78.05
Banda	Banda	UA	Nagar Palika	160,432	85,473	74,959	18,317	83.61
Pilibhit	Pilibhit	UA	Nagar Palika	160,146	84,546	75,600	16,089	72.30
Barabanki	Barabanki	UA	Nagar Palika	154,692	77,766	69,065	16,093	81.15
Khurja	Bulandshahr	UA	Nagar Palika	142,636	75,384	67,252	20,072	72.75
Gonda	Gonda	UA	Nagar Palika	138,929	71,475	67,454	15,608	80.32
Mainpuri	Mainpuri	CITY	Nagar Palika	133,078	69,788	63,290	16,371	85.66
Lalitpur	Lalitpur	City	Nagar Palika	133,041	69,548	63,493	16,193	83.96
Etah	Etah	UA	Nagar Palika	131,023	69,446	61,577	15,890	85.62
Deoria	Deoria	City	Nagar Palika	129,570	67,754	61,816	13,821	93.73
Ghazipur	Ghazipur	UA	Nagar Palika	121,136	63,689	57,447	13,986	84.97
Sultanpur	Sultanpur	UA	Nagar Palika	116,211	61,062	55,149	12,368	87.61
Azamgarh	Azamgarh	UA	Nagar Palika	116,165	60,678	55,487	13,287	86.27
Bijnor	Bijnor	UA	Nagar Palika	115,381	60,656	54,725	14,499	77.90
Sahaswan	Budaun	UA	Nagar Palika	114,921	59,421	55,500	15,644	71.00
Basti	Basti	City	Nagar Palika	114,651	60,126	54,525	12,568	85.29
Chandausi	Sambhal	City	Nagar Palika	114,254	60,238	54,016	14,417	72.63
Akbarpur	Ambedkar Nagar	City	Nagar Palika	111,594	57,560	54,034	14,037	76.94
Ballia	Ballia	UA	Nagar Palika	111,287	59,340	51,947	11,522	86.65
Tanda	Ambedkar Nagar	City	Nagar Palika	109,539	55,946	53,593	16,147	69.25
Greater Noida	Gautam Budh Nagar	City	Notified Area	107,676	58,662	49,014	15,517	86.54
Shikohabad	Firozabad	City	Nagar Palika	107,300	57,017	50,283	12,956	81.68
Shamli	Shamli	City	Nagar Palika	147,233	57,236	49,997	13,724	81.97
Awagarh	Etah	City	Nagar Palika	102,106	54,335	48,771	13,386	71.44
Kasganj	Kasganj	City	Nagar Palika	101,241	53,507	47,734	13,043	78.56
* UA = Urban agglomeration, CT = Census Town

== See also ==
- Divisions of Uttar Pradesh
- Districts of Uttar Pradesh
- List of urban agglomerations in Uttar Pradesh
- List of metropolitan areas in India
- List of states and union territories of India by population
