= Aurangpur Sabhi =

Aurangpur Sabhi Sambhi
- Village / Gram Panchayat
- Location in Kanpur, Uttar Pradesh, India Aurangpur Sabhi (India)
- Coordinates: 26.79°N 80.05°E
- Country: India
- State: Uttar Pradesh
- District: Kanpur Nagar

Population (Estimated after 2011 Census of India)
  - Total: 6,165

Languages
  - Official: Hindi
- Time zone: UTC+5:30 (IST)
- PIN: 209202
- Vehicle registration: UP-78

Aurangpur Sabhi is a village and Gram panchayat in Bilhaur Tehsil, Kanpur Nagar district, Uttar Pradesh, India. It is located 55 km away from Kanpur City.
