= Gangupur =

Gangupur Gangwapur
- Village (Semi Town)
- Location in Kanpur, Uttar Pradesh, India
- Coordinates: 26.957478°N 79.999008°E
- Country: India
- State: Uttar Pradesh
- District: Kanpur Nagar

Population (2011)
  - Total: 1,040

Languages
  - Official: Hindi
- Time zone: UTC+5:30 (IST)
- PIN: 209202
- Telephone code: Code-05112

Gangupur (Gaṅgupur), also known as Gangwapur, is a village (semi town) in Bilhaur city in Kanpur district in the state of Uttar Pradesh, India on G.T. Road (NH 91), situated on the bank of the river Ganga near the Kanpur border. It is 15 km from Bilhaur and 4 km from Araul. Gangupur is around 65 km distance from its district main city of Kanpur and 11 km from Kannauj. It is located 96 km from Lucknow, the capital of Uttar Pradesh.

== Name ==
According to Paul Whalley, the name Gaṅgupur is derived from Gaṅgu, a common vernacular variation of the name Gaṅgā. This variant is also found in other place names like Gaṅgoh or Gaṅgwā.

== Economy ==
- Agriculture (Specially for Potato), business and animal husbandry are important to the local economy.
- There are an education center Swaroop Narayan Memorial Shiksha Niketan. And also a higher education center is DR. G.P.R.D. Patel Institute of Technology and degree college.
- It is also a cold storage hub for potatoes.

== Temple ==
- Jungleshur Baba Temple is a temple of Lord Shiva. It is 2 km from the town of Araul and 2 km from Gangupur.

== Educational center ==
- Swaroop Narayan Memorial Shiksha Niketan, Gangupur
- G.P.R.D Degree College

== Transportation ==
Gangupur is well connected by rail (Gangwapur Railway Station) and located at the national highway Grand Trunk (G.T.) road (NH 91). Nearest airport is C A Kanpur Airport.
