= Itora =

Village in Uttar Pradesh, India

Itora Itaura
- Village
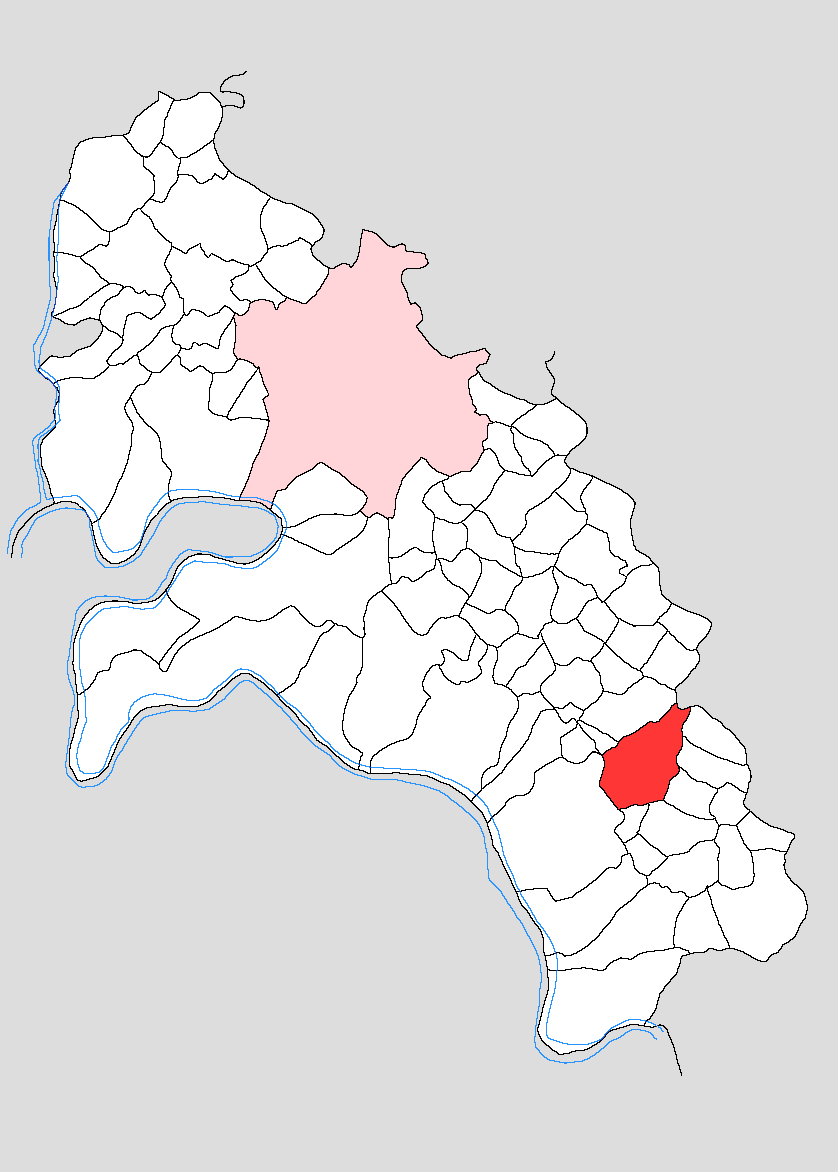
- Map showing Itora in Firozabad block

- Location in Uttar Pradesh, India
- Coordinates: 27.0604°N 78.48065°E
- Country: India
- State: Uttar Pradesh
- District: Firozabad
- Tehsil: Firozabad

Area
  - Total: 4.601 km^{2} (1.776 sq mi)

Population (2011)
  - Total: 3,675
  - Density: 798.7/km^{2} (2,069/sq mi)
- Time zone: UTC+5:30 (IST)

Itaura (Iṭorā), also spelled Itaura, is a village in Firozabad block of Firozabad district, Uttar Pradesh. It is located southeast of Firozabad, close to the tehsil boundary with Shikohabad. As of 2011, it had a population of 3,675, in 594 households.

== Geography ==
Itora is located southeast of Firozabad, close to the tehsil boundary with Shikohabad. The surrounding terrain is basically all level farmland. Nearby villages include Jendamai to the east, Kolamai to the northeast, Matsena to the north, Wazirpur Anandipur to the west, Dhakpura and Sengai to the south, and Nanpi Pithni to the southeast.

== Demographics ==
As of 2011, Itora had a population of 3,675, in 594 households. This population was 53.9% male (1,979) and 46.1% female (1,696). The 0–6 age group numbered 679 (362 male and 317 female), making up 18.5% of the total population. 1,919 residents were members of Scheduled Castes, or 52.2% of the total.

The 1981 census recorded Itora as having a population of 1,999 people (1,117 male and 882 female), in 354 households and 349 physical houses.

The 1961 census recorded Itora as comprising 3 hamlets, with a total population of 1,511 people (820 male and 691 female), in 278 households and 206 physical houses. The area of the village was given as 1,137 acres.

== Infrastructure ==
As of 2011, Itora had 2 primary schools; it did not have any healthcare facilities. Drinking water was provided by tap and hand pump; there were no public toilets. The village did not have a post office or public library; there was at least some access to electricity for all purposes. Streets were made of both kachcha and pakka materials.
