= Baramau =

- Village
- Location in Kanpur, Uttar Pradesh, India Baramau (India)
- Coordinates: 26.81°N 80.05°E
- Country: India
- State: Uttar Pradesh
- District: Kanpur Nagar

Population (2011 Census of India)
  - Total: 1,722

Languages
  - Official: Hindi
- Time zone: UTC+5:30 (IST)
- PIN: 209210
- Vehicle registration: UP-78

Baramau is a village and Gram panchayat in Bilhaur Tehsil, Kanpur Nagar district, Uttar Pradesh, India. It is located 57 km away from Kanpur City. Village code is 149947.
