= Bilhaur Dehat =

- Village
- Location in Kanpur, Uttar Pradesh, India Bilhaur Dehat (India)
- Coordinates: 26.85°N 80.05°E
- Country: India
- State: Uttar Pradesh
- District: Kanpur Nagar

Population (2011 Census of India)
  - Total: 6,100

Languages
  - Official: Hindi
- Time zone: UTC+5:30 (IST)
- PIN: 209202
- Vehicle registration: UP-78

Bilhaur Dehat is a village and Gram panchayat in Bilhaur Tehsil, Kanpur Nagar district, Uttar Pradesh, India. Its village code is 149954. According to 2011 Census of India the total population of the village is 6,100 in which 3,189 is males and 2,911 are females.
