= Bakothi =

- Village
- Location in Kanpur, Uttar Pradesh, India Bakothi (India)
- Coordinates: 26.87°N 80.02°E
- Country: India
- State: Uttar Pradesh
- District: Kanpur Nagar

Population (2011 Census of India)
  - Total: 3,269

Languages
  - Official: Hindi
- Time zone: UTC+5:30 (IST)
- PIN: 209202
- Vehicle registration: UP-78

Bakothi is a village and Gram panchayat in Bilhaur Tehsil, Kanpur Nagar district, Uttar Pradesh, India. According to the 2011 census, the total population of the village is 787; 392 males and 395 females. It is located 66 km away from Kanpur City. Its village code is 149927.
