= Chak Khaspur =

- Village
- Location in Kanpur, Uttar Pradesh, India Chak Khaspur (India)
- Coordinates: 26.87°N 80.00°E
- Country: India
- State: Uttar Pradesh
- District: Kanpur Nagar

Population (2011 Census of India)
  - Total: 253

Languages
  - Official: Hindi
- Time zone: UTC+5:30 (IST)
- PIN: 209202
- Vehicle registration: UP-78

Chak Khaspur is a village in Baira Khanpur Gram panchayat in Bilhaur Tehsil, Kanpur Nagar district, Uttar Pradesh, India. Its village code is 149925. According to 2011 Census of India the total population of the village is 253, in which 138 are males and 115 are females.
