= Urban agglomerations in Uttar Pradesh =

In the India census of 2011, an urban agglomeration was defined as:

An urban agglomeration is a continuous urban spread constituting a town and its adjoining outgrowths (OGs), or two or more physically contiguous towns together with or without outgrowths of such towns. An Urban Agglomeration must consist of at least a statutory town and its total population (i.e. all the constituents put together) should not be less than 20,000 as per the 2001 Census. In varying local conditions, there were similar other combinations which have been treated as urban agglomerations satisfying the basic condition of contiguity.

—

Abbreviations: M Corp. = Municipal corporation; NP = Nagar Palika/Nagar Panchayat; NPP = Nagar Palika Parishad; CT = Census town; OG = Out Growth; CB = Cantonment Board

Urban agglomerations in Uttar Pradesh with populations over 100,000
| Urban agglomeration | Name of constituent | District | Type* | Population as of 2011 | | | | Literacy Rate |
| Urban agglomeration | Name of constituent | District | Type* | Total | Male | Female | Children under 5 yrs | Literacy Rate |
|---|---|---|---|---|---|---|---|---|
| Kanpur | Kanpur | Kanpur | M Corp | 2,920,031 | 1,515,370 | 1,404,661 | 251,127 | 84.14 |
| Kanpur | Kanpur Cantonment | Kanpur | C | 108,035 | 58,505 | 49,530 | 10,750 | 79.65 |
| Kanpur | Chakeri | Kanpur | CT | 7,526 | 3,803 | 3,723 | 1,116 | 89.63 |
| Kanpur | Shuklaganj | Unnao | NPP | 84,072 | 44,098 | 39,974 | 9,604 | 78.91 |
| Kanpur | Unnao | Unnao | NPP | 177,658 | 93,021 | 84,637 | 19,980 | 81.71 |
| Kanpur | Katri Piper Khera | Unnao | CT | 26,475 | 14,192 | 12,283 | 3,368 | 78.72 |
| Kanpur | Armapore Estate | Kanpur | CT | 15,463 | 8,160 | 7,303 | 1,431 | 89.13 |
| Lucknow | Lucknow | Lucknow | M Corp. | 2,815,601 | 1,470,133 | 1,345,468 | 280,817 | 84.72 |
| Ghaziabad | Ghaziabad | Ghaziabad | M Corp. | 15,12,296 | 273,859 | 238,437 | 76,231 | 75.24 |
| Ghaziabad | Khora | Ghaziabad | CT | 189,410 | 102,669 | 86,741 | 26,599 | 86.00 |
| Agra | Agra | Agra | M Corp. | 1,574,542 | 849,771 | 724,771 | 186,516 | 63.44 |
| Varanasi | Varanasi | Varanasi | M Corp. | 1,432,280 | 758,795 | 673,884 | 129,180 | 80.12 |
| Meerut | Meerut | Meerut | M Corp. | 1,309,023 | 689,567 | 619,456 | 163,910 | 77.70 |
| Prayagraj | Prayagraj | Prayagraj | M Corp. | 1,117,094 | 601,363 | 515,731 | 102,556 | 86.50 |
| Bareilly | Bareilly | Bareilly | M Corp. | 898,167 | 477,438 | 420,729 | 94,915 | 70.17 |
| Aligarh | Aligarh | Aligarh | M Corp. | 872,575 | 463,123 | 409,452 | 113,658 | 70.36 |
| Gorakhpur | Gorakhpur | Gorakhpur | M Corp. | 671,048 | 353,550 | 317,498 | 62,205 | 85.97 |
| Ayodhya | Ayodhya | Ayodhya | M Corp. | 642,678 | 300,000 | 342,000 | 678 | 90.09 |
| Jhansi | Jhansi | Jhansi | M Corp. | 507,293 | 268,101 | 239,192 | 51,762 | 83.81 |
| Muzaffarnagar | Muzaffarnagar | Muzaffarnagar | NPP | 392,451 | 206,902 | 185,549 | 48,692 | 80.99 |
| Mathura-Vrindavan | Mathura-Vrindavan | Mathura | NPP | 349,336 | 186,586 | 162,750 | 41,888 | 76.75 |
| Rampur | Rampur | Rampur | NPP | 325,248 | 169,826 | 155,422 | 37,945 | 60.74 |
| Shahjahanpur | Shahjahanpur | Shahjahanpur | NPP | 327,975 | 173,133 | 154,842 | 36,606 | 68.92 |
| Farrukhabad-Fategarh | Farrukhabad-Fategarh | Farrukhabad | NPP | 275,754 | 145,515 | 130,239 | 32,342 | 74.92 |
| Mirzapur-Vindhyachal | Mirzapur-Vindhyachal | Mirzapur | NPP | 233,691 | 125,003 | 108,688 | 27,744 | 78.25 |
| Bulandshahr | Bulandshahr | Bulandshahr | NPP | 222,826 | 116,923 | 105,903 | 28,936 | 78.98 |
| Hardoi | Hardoi | Hardoi | NPP | 126,890 | 66,752 | 60,138 | 13,040 | 87.15 |
| Orai | Orai | Jalaun | NPP | 187,185 | 99,564 | 87,621 | 20,031 | 83.31 |
| Sitapur | Sitapur | Sitapur | NPP | 177,351 | 93,410 | 83,941 | 18,529 | 83.11 |
| Modinagar | Modinagar | Ghaziabad | NPP | 130,161 | 69,179 | 60,982 | 14,181 | 90.00 |
| Lakhimpur | Lakhimpur | Lakhimpur Kheri | NPP | 152,010 | 81,050 | 70,960 | 16,307 | 84.39 |
| Hathras | Hathras | Hathras | NPP | 137,509 | 73,376 | 64,133 | 16,686 | 79.06 |
| Banda | Banda | Banda | NPP | 154,388 | 82,215 | 72,173 | 17,697 | 83.30 |
| Pilibhit | Pilibhit | Pilibhit | NPP | 130,428 | 68,855 | 61,573 | 11,767 | 74.26 |
| P. D.D.U. Nagar | P. D.D.U. Nagar | Chandauli | NPP | 110,110 | 57,925 | 52,185 | 13,997 | 82.83 |
| Khurja | Khurja | Bulandshahr | NPP | 111,089 | 58,577 | 52,512 | 15,510 | 67.63 |
| Gonda | Gonda | Gonda | NPP | 114,353 | 58,484 | 55,869 | 12,289 | 81.07 |
| Mainpuri | Mainpuri | Mainpuri | NPP | 117,327 | 61,481 | 55,846 | 14,300 | 85.95 |
| Etah | Etah | Etah | NPP | 118,632 | 62,966 | 55,666 | 14,164 | 86.43 |
| Ghazipur | Ghazipur | Ghazipur | NPP | 110,698 | 58,126 | 52,572 | 12,689 | 85.46 |
| Sultanpur | Sultanpur | Sultanpur | NPP | 107,914 | 56,674 | 51,240 | 11,266 | 88.63 |
| Azamgarh | Azamgarh | Azamgarh | NPP | 110,980 | 58,033 | 52,947 | 12,629 | 86.43 |
| Ballia | Ballia | Ballia | NPP | 104,271 | 55,706 | 48,565 | 10,798 | 86.62 |

== See also ==
- List of cities in Uttar Pradesh
- List of urban local bodies in Uttar Pradesh
