= Saraiya Bhoor =

- Village
- Location in Kanpur, Uttar Pradesh, India Saraiya Bhoor (India)
- Coordinates: 26.89°N 80.02°E
- Country: India
- State: Uttar Pradesh
- District: Kanpur Nagar

Population (2011 Census of India)
  - Total: 903

Languages
  - Official: Hindi
- Time zone: UTC+5:30 (IST)
- PIN: 209202
- Vehicle registration: UP-78

Saraiya Bhoor is a village in Baira Khanpur Gram panchayat in Bilhaur Tehsil, Kanpur Nagar district, Uttar Pradesh, India. According to 2011 Census of India the total population of the village is 903.
