= Raypur, Kanpur Nagar =

Raypur
- Village
- Location in Kanpur, Uttar Pradesh, India Raypur (India)
- Coordinates: 26.79°N 80.09°E
- Country: India
- State: Uttar Pradesh
- District: Kanpur Nagar

Population (2011 Census of India)
  - Total: 396

Languages
  - Official: Hindi
- Time zone: UTC+5:30 (IST)
- PIN: 209210
- Vehicle registration: UP-78

Raypur is a village in Dadarpur Katha Gram panchayat in Bilhaur Tehsil, Kanpur Nagar district, Uttar Pradesh, India. Its village code is 149979. According to 2011 Census of India the population of the village is 396, in which 234 are males and 162 are females.
