= Sujawalpur =

- Village
- Location in Kanpur, Uttar Pradesh, India Sujawalpur (India)
- Coordinates: 26.71770°N 80.09520°E
- Country: India
- State: Uttar Pradesh
- District: Kanpur Nagar

Population (2011 Census of India)
  - Total: 787

Languages
  - Official: Hindi
- Time zone: UTC+5:30 (IST)
- PIN: 209210
- Vehicle registration: UP-78

Sujawalpur is a village in Bilhaur Tehsil, Kanpur Nagar district, Uttar Pradesh, India.

According to 2011 Census of India the total population of the village is 787.
