= Gajana (Bilhaur) =

Gajana Gangapur
- Village
- Location in Kanpur, Uttar Pradesh, India Gajana (India)
- Coordinates: 26.94°N 79.98°E
- Country: India
- State: Uttar Pradesh
- District: Kanpur Nagar
- Founder: Nishant Singh
- Named for: U.P.government

Population (2011 Census of India)
  - Total: 1,622

Languages
  - Official: Hindi
- Time zone: UTC+5:30 (IST)
- PIN: 209202
- Vehicle registration: UP-78

Gajana is a village and Gram panchayat in Bilhaur Tehsil, Kanpur Nagar district, Uttar Pradesh, India. Its village code is 149905. As per 2011 Census of India report the population of the village is 1,622 where 867 are men and 755 are women. It is located 76 KM towards North from Kanpur.
