= Bibipur, Bilhaur =

Bibipur
- Village
- Location in Kanpur, Uttar Pradesh, India Bibipur (India)
- Coordinates: 26.82°N 80.06°E
- Country: India
- State: Uttar Pradesh
- District: Kanpur Nagar

Population (2011 Census of India)
  - Total: 1,861

Languages
  - Official: Hindi
- Time zone: UTC+5:30 (IST)
- PIN: 209202
- Vehicle registration: UP-78

Bibipur is a village and Gram panchayat in Bilhaur Tehsil, Kanpur Nagar district, Uttar Pradesh, India. It is located 60 km away from Kanpur City. Village Code is 149964.
