= Sarh (disambiguation) =

Sarh is a city in Chad.

Sarh may also refer to:

- Sarh (crater), impact crater on Mars
- Sarh, Kanpur, a town in Uttar Pradesh, India
- Sarh, Mainpuri, a village in Uttar Pradesh, India
- Semi-active radar homing (SARH), a type of missile guidance system

== See also ==
- Sarah (disambiguation)
