= Dewkali Bilhaur =

Village in Uttar Pradesh, India

- Village
- Location in Kanpur, Uttar Pradesh, India Dewkali Bilhaur (India)
- Coordinates: 26.88°N 79.98°E
- Country: India
- State: Uttar Pradesh
- District: Kanpur Nagar

Population (2011 Census of India)
  - Total: 976

Languages
  - Official: Hindi
- Time zone: UTC+5:30 (IST)
- PIN: 209210
- Vehicle registration: UP-78

Dewkali Bilhaur is a village and Gram panchayat in Bilhaur Tehsil, Kanpur Nagar district, Uttar Pradesh, India. Its village code is 149890. As per 2011 Census of India report the population of the village is 976 where 522 are men and 454 are women.
