= Birthi Haveli =

- Village
- Location in Kanpur, Uttar Pradesh, India Birthi Haveli (India)
- Coordinates: 26.90°N 80.02°E
- Country: India
- State: Uttar Pradesh
- District: Kanpur Nagar

Population (2011 Census of India)
  - Total: 1,208

Languages
  - Official: Hindi
- Time zone: UTC+5:30 (IST)
- PIN: 209202
- Vehicle registration: UP-78

Birthi Haveli is a village and Gram panchayat in Bilhaur Tehsil, Kanpur Nagar district, Uttar Pradesh, India. It is located 80 km away from Kanpur City. Village Code is 149920.
