= Dhakpura, Firozabad =

Village in Uttar Pradesh, India

Dhakpura
- Village
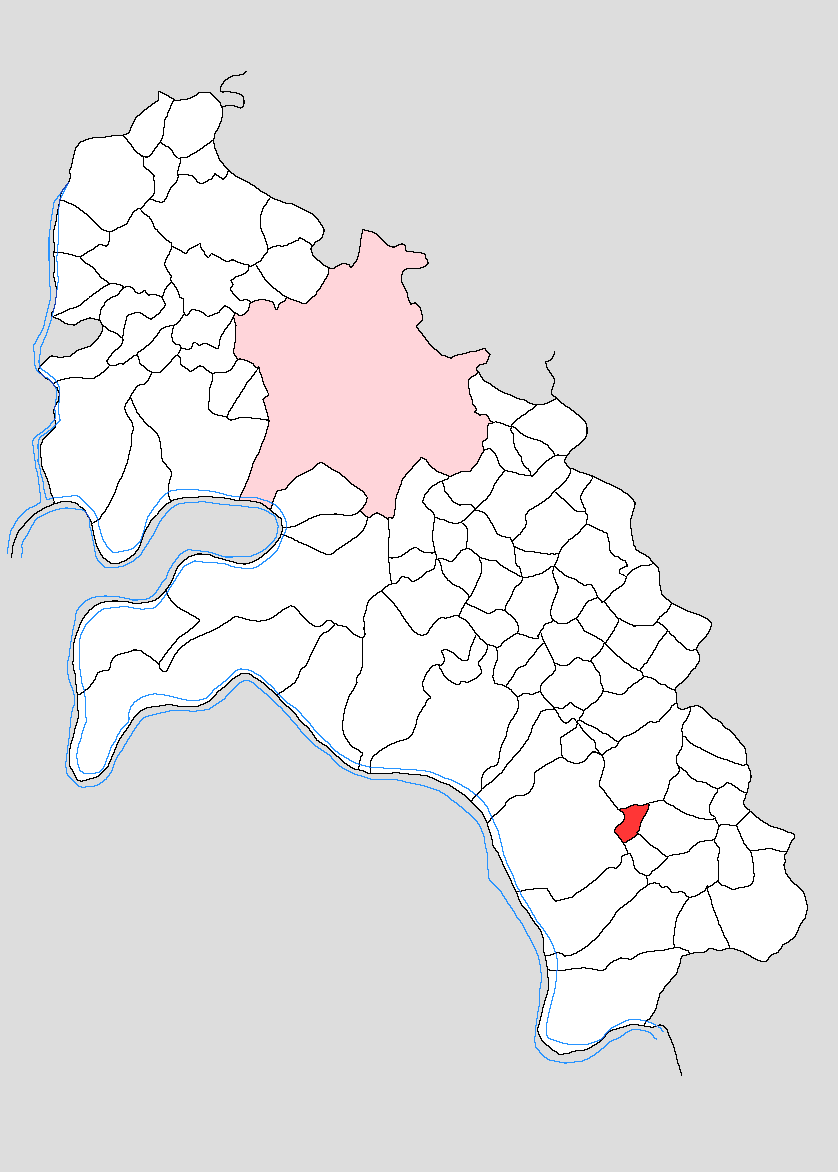
- Map showing Dhakpura in Firozabad block

- Location in Uttar Pradesh, India
- Coordinates: 27.04025°N 78.47236°E
- Country: India
- State: Uttar Pradesh
- District: Firozabad
- Tehsil: Firozabad

Area
  - Total: 1.259 km^{2} (0.486 sq mi)

Population (2011)
  - Total: 1,259
  - Density: 1,000/km^{2} (2,590/sq mi)
- Time zone: UTC+5:30 (IST)
- PIN: 322803

Dhakpura (Ḍhakpurā) is a village in Firozabad block of Firozabad district, Uttar Pradesh. It is located very close to the village of Sengai, to the south of Firozabad. As of 2011, it had a population of 1,259, in 214 households.

== Geography ==
Dhakpura is located southeast of Firozabad and is basically surrounded by flat farmland. The village of Sengai is located very close to the east-southeast of Dhakpura. Other nearby villages include Jalalpur to the west and Itora to the north.

== Demographics ==
As of 2011, Dhakpura had a population of 1,259, in 214 households. This population was 54.9% male (691) and 45.1% female (568). The 0–6 age group numbered 168 (77 male and 91 female), making up 13.3% of the total population. No residents were members of Scheduled Castes.

The 1981 census recorded Dhakpura as having a population of 747 people (395 male and 352 female), in 126 households and 126 physical houses.

The 1961 census recorded Dhakpura as comprising 1 hamlet, with a total population of 468 people (247 male and 221 female), in 65 households and 52 physical houses. The area of the village was given as 191 acres.

== Infrastructure ==
As of 2011, Dhakpura had 1 primary school; it did not have any healthcare facilities. Drinking water was provided by hand pump and tube well/bore well; there were no public toilets. The village did not have a post office or public library; there was at least some access to electricity for residential and agricultural (but not commercial) purposes. Streets were made of both kachcha and pakka materials.
