= Gadanpur Ahar =

- Village
- Location in Kanpur, Uttar Pradesh, India Gadanpur Ahar (India)
- Coordinates: 26.80°N 80.09°E
- Country: India
- State: Uttar Pradesh
- District: Kanpur Nagar

Population (2011 Census of India)
  - Total: 1,115

Languages
  - Official: Hindi
- Time zone: UTC+5:30 (IST)
- PIN: 209210
- Vehicle registration: UP-78

Gadanpur Ahar is a village and Gram panchayat in Bilhaur Tehsil, Kanpur Nagar district, Uttar Pradesh, India. Its village code is 149969. As per 2011 Census of India report the population of the village is 1,115 where 625 are men and 490 are women.
