= Hardaspur Nisfi =

Village in Uttar Pradesh, India

- Village
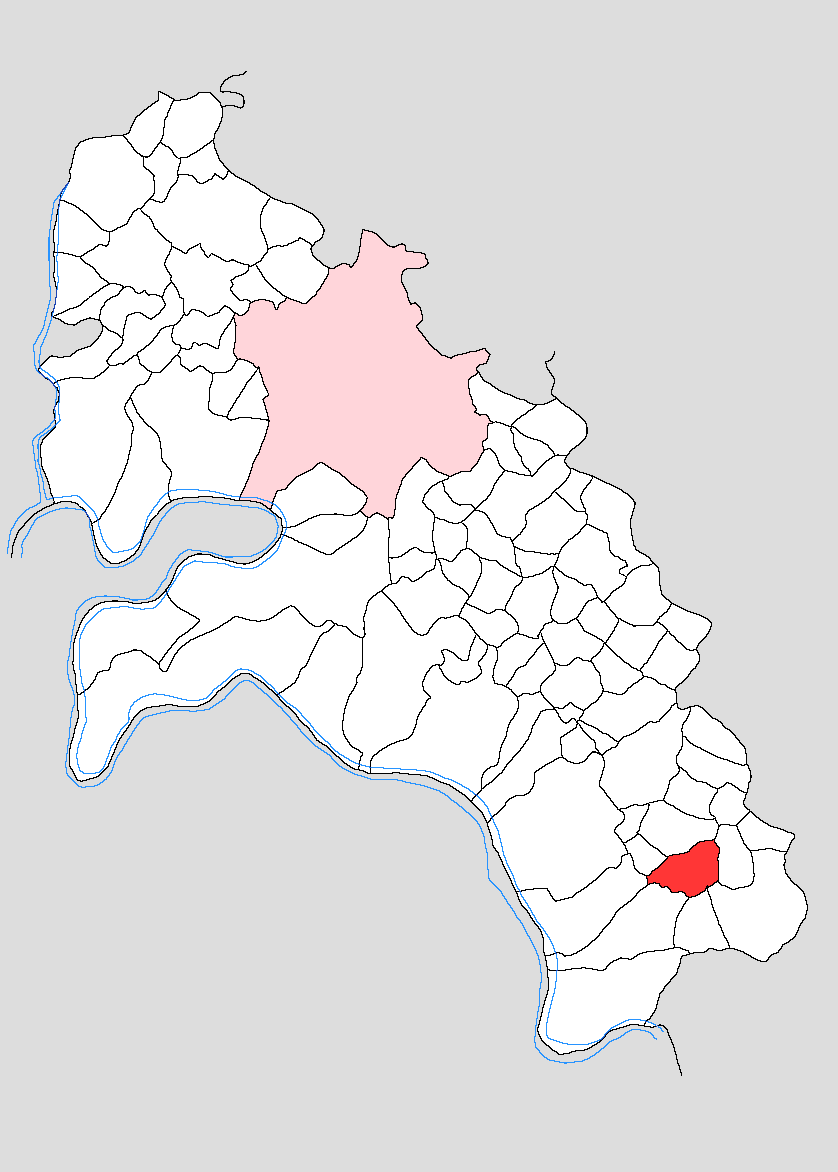
- Map showing Hardaspur Nisfi in Firozabad block

- Location in Uttar Pradesh, India
- Coordinates: 27.03373°N 78.4973°E
- Country: India
- State: Uttar Pradesh
- District: Firozabad
- Tehsil: Firozabad

Area
  - Total: 2.105 km^{2} (0.813 sq mi)

Population (2011)
  - Total: 1,797
  - Density: 853.7/km^{2} (2,211/sq mi)
- Time zone: UTC+5:30 (IST)
- PIN: 283208

Hardaspur Nisfi (Hardāspur Nisfī) is a village in Firozabad block of Firozabad district, Uttar Pradesh. It is located southeast of Firozabad, close to the tehsil boundary with Shikohabad. As of 2011, it had a population of 1,797, in 266 households.

== Geography ==
Hardaspur Nisfi is located well to the southeast of Firozabad, close to the tehsil boundary with Shikohabad. The surrounding terrain is basically all level farmland. Nearby villages include Datauli about 2 km to the east, Nargapur to the south, and Sengai and Nanpi Pithni to the northwest.

== Demographics ==
As of 2011, Hardaspur Nisfi had a population of 1,797, in 266 households. This population was 55.0% male (989) and 45.0% female (808). The 0–6 age group numbered 306 (148 male and 158 female), making up 17.0% of the total population. 77 residents were members of Scheduled Castes, or 4.3% of the total.

The 1981 census recorded Hardaspur Nisfi as having a population of 961 people (537 male and 424 female), in 139 households and 138 physical houses.

The 1961 census recorded Hardaspur Nisfi as comprising 1 hamlet, with a total population of 202 people (99 male and 103 female), in 35 households and 23 physical houses. The area of the village was given as 191 acres.

== Infrastructure ==
As of 2011, Hardaspur Nisfi had 1 primary school; it did not have any healthcare facilities. Drinking water was provided by hand pump and tube well/bore well; there were no public toilets. The village did not have a post office or public library; there was at least some access to electricity for all purposes. Streets were made of both kachcha and pakka materials.
