= Dadarpur Katha =

- Village
- Location in Kanpur, Uttar Pradesh, India Dadarpur Katha (India)
- Coordinates: 26.77°N 80.08°E
- Country: India
- State: Uttar Pradesh
- District: Kanpur Nagar

Population (2011 Census of India)
  - Total: 1,336

Languages
  - Official: Hindi
- Time zone: UTC+5:30 (IST)
- PIN: 209202
- Vehicle registration: UP-78

Dadarpur Katha is a village and Gram panchayat in Bilhaur Tehsil, Kanpur Nagar district, Uttar Pradesh, India. It is located 53km away from Kanpur City. According to 2011 Census of India the population of the village is 1,336, in which 742 are males and 594 are females.
