= Gadanpur Chorsa =

- Village
- Location in Kanpur, Uttar Pradesh, India Gadanpur Chorsa (India)
- Coordinates: 26.76°N 80.02°E
- Country: India
- State: Uttar Pradesh
- District: Kanpur Nagar

Population (2011 Census of India)
  - Total: 2,501

Languages
  - Official: Hindi
- Time zone: UTC+5:30 (IST)
- PIN: 209210
- Vehicle registration: UP-78

Gadanpur Chorsa is a village and Gram panchayat in Bilhaur Tehsil, Kanpur Nagar district, Uttar Pradesh, India. Its village code is 149952. As per 2011 Census of India report the population of the village is 2501 where 1344 are men and 1157 are women.
