= Ramaipur, Kanpur =

Village in Uttar Pradesh, India

Ramaipur is a village in Kanpur district, Uttar Pradesh located just south of Kanpur on National Highways 86. In 2001, the population was 7,338 people with 3,966 males and 3,372 females. Ramaipur is the site for the proposed 2000 acre Mega Leather Cluster by Government of Uttar Pradesh.
