= Shambhua =

Shambhua is a revenue village in Kanpur Nagar district of Uttar Pradesh. It is located near National Highway 36 between the river Rind and Shambhua railway crossing. It is a gram panchayat, included 12 villages. Most of the population depends upon agriculture for their income. It is known for production of tomato and chilli. Maximum population comes under caste category OBC.

Two temples are very ancient.

Old shiv temple

Rav Karinga Baba temple [situated over a hill top close to river Rind]
