= Allahdadpur =

Village in Uttar Pradesh, India

- Village
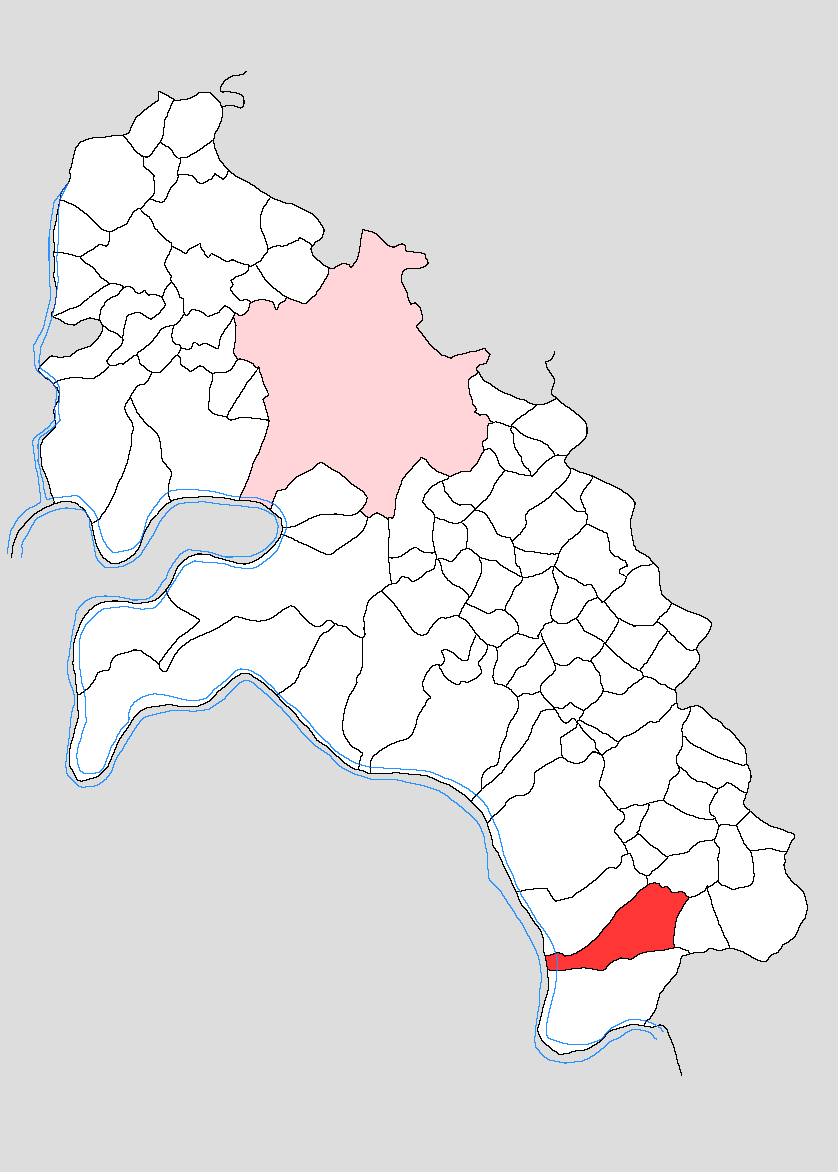
- Map showing Allahdadpur in Firozabad block

- Location in Uttar Pradesh, India
- Coordinates: 27.01348°N 78.47718°E
- Country: India
- State: Uttar Pradesh
- District: Firozabad
- Tehsil: Firozabad

Area
  - Total: 4.418 km^{2} (1.706 sq mi)

Population (2011)
  - Total: 4,003
  - Density: 906.1/km^{2} (2,347/sq mi)
- Time zone: UTC+5:30 (IST)
- PIN: 322803

Allahdadpur is a village in Firozabad block of Firozabad district, Uttar Pradesh. It is located southeast of Firozabad, close to the tehsil boundary with Shikohabad and about 2 km east of the bank of the Yamuna. As of 2011, it had a population of 4,003, in 568 households.

== Geography ==
Allahdadpur is located southeast of Firozabad, close to the tehsil boundary with Shikohabad. There is a prominent ravine just to the south of Allahdadpur, running from east to west and eventually reaching the Yamuna about 2 km west of the village. Several patches of relatively dense forest, with babul as the main tree, exist to the south, southwest, and west of the village, especially in the ravines along the east bank of the Yamuna. To the north, Allahdadpur is surrounded by flat farmland. Nearby villages include Sikahra Hardaspur to the northwest and Nargapur to the northeast.

== Demographics ==
As of 2011, Allahdadpur had a population of 4,003, in 568 households. This population was 54.3% male (2,172) and 45.7% female (1,831). The 0–6 age group numbered 668 (349 male and 319 female), making up 16.7% of the total population. 288 residents were members of Scheduled Castes, or 7.2% of the total.

The 1981 census recorded Allahdadpur as having a population of 2,114 people (1,152 male and 962 female), in 325 households and 323 physical houses.

The 1961 census recorded Allahdadpur as comprising 2 hamlets, with a total population of 1,616 people (874 male and 742 female), in 262 households and 184 physical houses. The area of the village was given as 1,138 acres.

== Infrastructure ==
As of 2011, Allahdadpur had 1 primary school; it did not have any healthcare facilities. Drinking water was provided by tap, hand pump, and tube well/bore well; there were no public toilets. The village had a sub post office but no public library; there was at least some access to electricity for all purposes. Streets were made of both kachcha and pakka materials.
