= Karbigwan =

- town
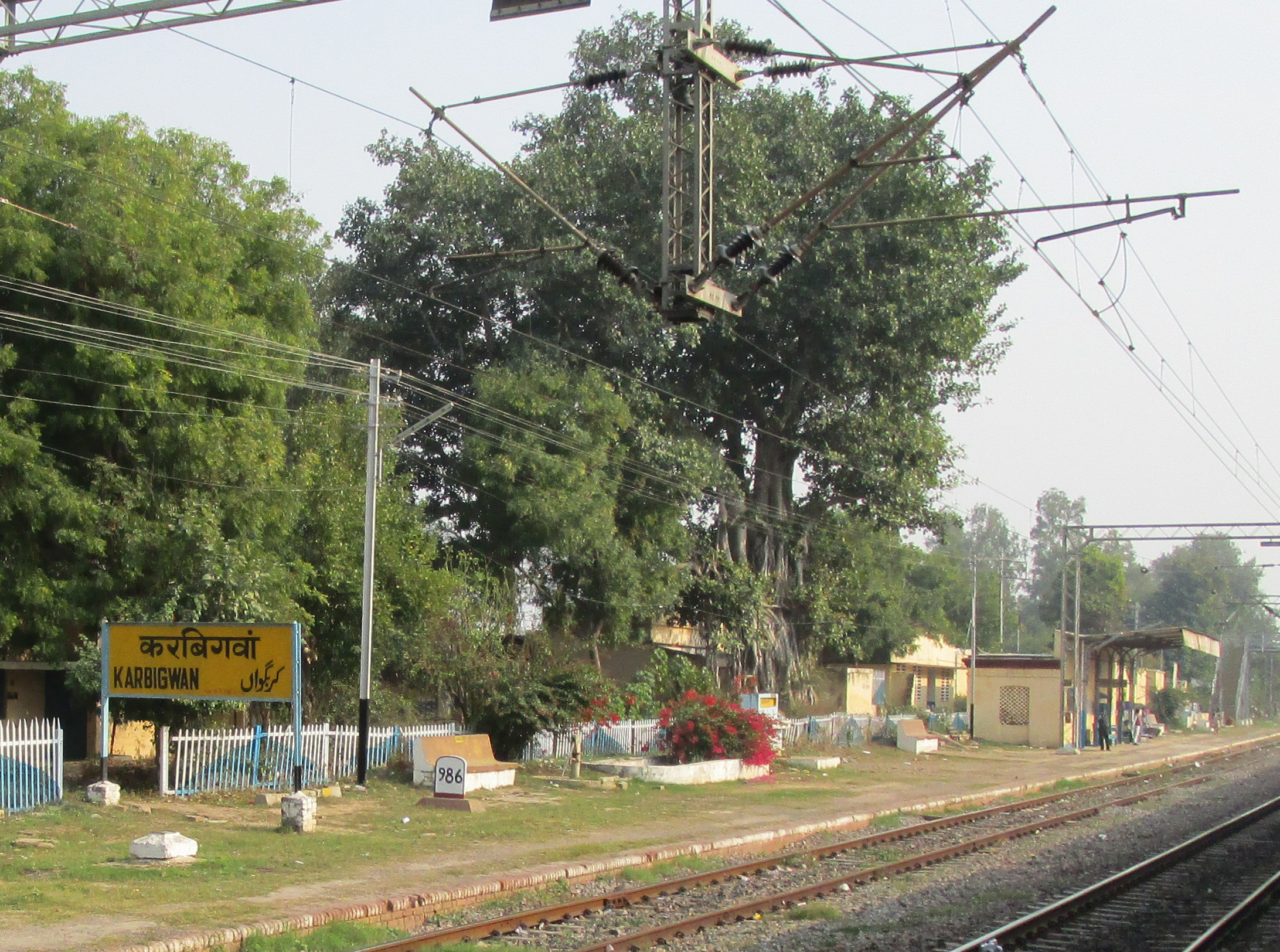
- Karbigwan Railway Station at Kanpur

- Location in Uttar Pradesh, India
- Coordinates: 26°12′N 80°30′E
- Country: India
- State: Uttar Pradesh
- District: Kanpur

Languages
  - Official: Hindi
- Time zone: UTC+5:30 (IST)
- Vehicle registration: UP-78

Karbigwan is a town located in the Kanpur Nagar district of Uttar Pradesh, India, about 35 kilometres (22 mi) south of Kanpur, the district's largest village.

The town's official postal code is 209402, and it is served by the Karbigwan Railway Station (station code: KBN), which connects the area to various destinations.
