= Chaubi Gahi Shikohabad =

- Village
- Location in Kanpur, Uttar Pradesh, India Chaubi Gahi Shikohabad (India)
- Coordinates: 26.81°N 80.07°E
- Country: India
- State: Uttar Pradesh
- District: Kanpur Nagar

Population (2011 Census of India)
  - Total: 1,064

Languages
  - Official: Hindi
- Time zone: UTC+5:30 (IST)
- PIN: 209210
- Vehicle registration: UP-78

Chaubi Gahi Shikohabad is a village and Gram panchayat in Bilhaur Tehsil, Kanpur Nagar district, Uttar Pradesh, India. It is located 60 KM away from Kanpur City.
