= Dadikha =

- Village
- Location in Kanpur, Uttar Pradesh, India Dadikha (India)
- Coordinates: 26.85°N 80.08°E
- Country: India
- State: Uttar Pradesh
- District: Kanpur Nagar

Population (2011 Census of India)
  - Total: 1,256

Languages
  - Official: Hindi
- Time zone: UTC+5:30 (IST)
- PIN: 209202
- Vehicle registration: UP-78

Dadikha is a village and Gram panchayat in Bilhaur Tehsil, Kanpur Nagar district, Uttar Pradesh, India. It is located 61 KM towards North from Kanpur City. According to 2011 Census of India the total population of the village is 1,256, out of 661 are males and 595 are females. Its village code is 149935.
