= Appan Samachar =

Indian new channel

- All Women News Network
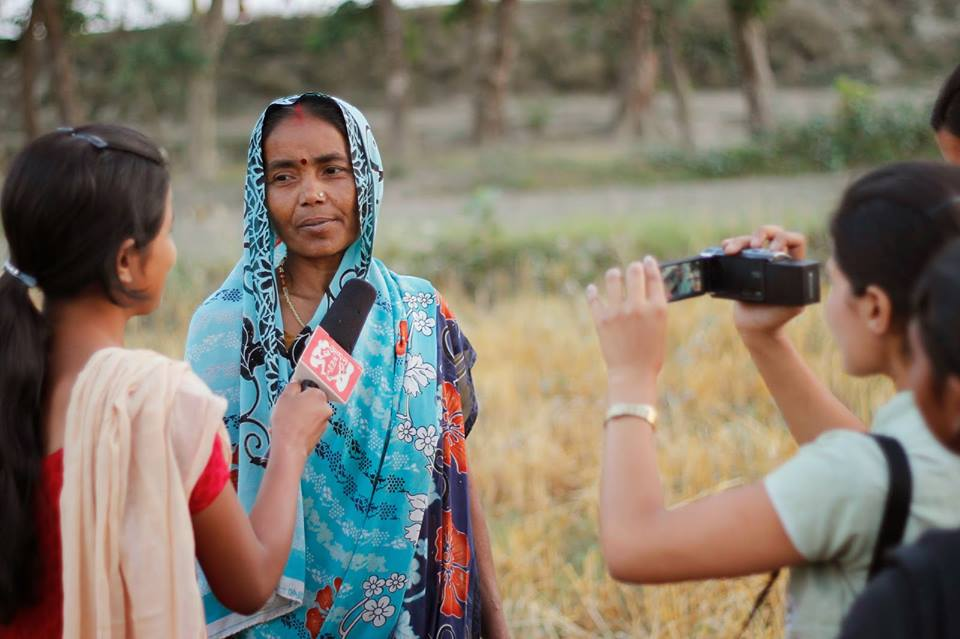
- Firebrand Women Reporters of Appan Samachar
- Founder: Santosh Sarang
- Editor: Rinku Kumari
- Founded: December 6, 2007; 18 years ago in Muzaffarpur, Bihar, India
- Language: Hindi
- Website: appansamachar.com

Appan Samachar (Hindi: अप्पन समाचार) is an all women village news network. It is fortnightly rural news channel run by a group of women, most of them marginalised Dalit, Other Backward Classes, Mushahar (rat eating community) & muslim communities in Muzaffarpur district of Bihar.

It was launched in 6 December 2007 at Muzaffarpur. It broadcasts to about a hundred villages in Paroo, Sahebganj, Saraiya, Marwan, Kanti, and Mushahari.

It was founded by Santosh Sarang. Mr. Sarang is also chairperson of trust named “Mission Eye International Services.” The key people consisting Appan Samachar Team are Rinku Kumari, Amritanj Indiwar, Siddhant Sarang, Rajesh Kumar, Pinki and Khushboo.

The team of the news channel have no formal training so they are learning it on the job. Time to time a trust “Mission Eye International Services” are conducting village media workshops to strengthen their skills. Appan Samachar focus on various social ills like farmers problems, environmental issues, social evils, women empowerment, child marriage, gender discrimination, female foeticide, etc. Young girls employed as a journalist in this channel generally rides bicycle to gather the news and interviews.

The screening of news bulletin is free to air. Villagers watch there news on projectors or a portable tv sets in community. Their viewers are both urban and rural. The bulletin also screened in district headquarters. News capsule are produced in Hindi and local dialect of Bhojpuri and Bajjika.

A report on Self Help Group running at chandkewari village highlighted corruption in Rural bank. After this report manager promised to distribute KCC loans without bribe. For its innovative efforts in October 2008 Appan Samachar received prestigious “Citizen Journalists Award” from CNN-IBN.

== See also ==
- Television in India
