= List of villages in Saraiya block =

List towns and villages in the Saraiya Block of Muzaffarpur district, Bihar, India.

- Abhi Chhapra
- Abu Chak
- Ajodhpur urf Ibrahimpur
- Amaitha
- Amuara Chaube
- Amuara Tej Singh
- Anandpur
- Anantpur Gangauli
- Arar Lakhmipur
- Arupur
- Atraulia
- Azizpur Belwar
- Baghnagri
- Bahilwara Bhual
- Bahilwara Gobind
- Bahilwara Rupnath
- Bakhra
- Balurampur urf Tilak Pakri
- Banauli urf Rasalpur
- Bania
- Banyra Rahi
- Bardaha
- Barewa
- Barhanpura
- Basaitha
- Basatpur
- Basdeopur
- Basra Kazi
- Basra Shukul
- Basti Saloni
- Basu Kund
- Basudeo Patti
- Baudhia Tola
- Baya Dih
- Bela Saraiya
- Berua
- Bhagwanpur
- Bhataulia
- Birpur
- Bisambharpur
- Bisauli urf Bitraulia
- Bisheshar Patti
- Bishunpur Anant
- Bishunpur Anant urf Uphraul
- Bishunpur Basant urf Bishunpur
- Bishunpur Basant urf Suba
- Chainpur Pakri
- Chak Abdul Rahim
- Chak Alisher urf Basu Chak
- Chak Bazo
- Chak Bazo
- Chak Ibrahim
- Chak Mandua
- Chak Rahmat
- Chak Saidani
- Chakda urf Chakna
- Chakia urf Chak Bishunpur Anan
- Chakia urf Neamapur
- Chhapra Kuldip
- Chhapra urf Chaku Chhapra
- Chhitri
- Chochaha
- Damodar Chhapra
- Datapur urf Pach Bhinda
- Dhanauj Sheikh
- Dhanrajpur urf Arar
- Dhanupara
- Doma Dih Bishunpur Dubiahi
- Dubiahi
- Gahila
- Gahilo urf Barahanpur
- Ghoghraha
- Gidha
- Ginjas
- Gobindpur*Note: Two entries in the source
- Golwara
- Gopalpur urf Neura
- GOpi Dhaut
- Gopinathpur Doghra
- Gopinathpur Sioria
- Gorgawan Dih
- Gosain Chhapra
- Gurgawan
- Hariharpur
- Harpur
- Harpur Beni
- Harpur Ghaus
- Jagarnathpur Doghra
- Jaintpur
- Jalalpur
- Jalalpur Dayal
- Jhujharpur
- Kaila Patti
- Kakrahi urf Faridabad
- Kamal Chak urf Chaku Chhapra
- Karhara
- Khaira
- Kolhua
- Kuian
- Kukrahia
- Lalpura
- Madhaul
- Madhopur Chakdi
- Madhuban
- Madhurapur
- Mahmadpur Baya
- Majhwa Pakar
- Mangauli
- Manikpur
- Moghlani Chak
- Munja Patrahia
- Narangi Jagdish
- Narangi Jiunath
- Narayanpur
- Pagahia
- Pagahia Aima
- Paigambarpur
- Paruia urf Hargobindpur
- Patorhi
- Patrahia
- Pipra Ghaus
- Pokhraira
- Raepura
- Ragho Chhapra
- Raghunathpur
- Raja Rampur
- Rampur Fakirana
- Rampur Nagwan
- Rampur Phagu
- Ratanpur Dih
- Ratanpura
- Ratwara Chandan
- Repura urf Rampur Balmi
- Repura urf Rampur Bishunath
- Rewa Dih
- Rupauli
- Sadipur
- Sarae Baya urf Paharpur
- Saraiya urf Bishunpur Kesho
- Sarkeshpur
- Serukahi
- Shujawalpur
- Siroi Aima
- Sohila Patti
- Supna
- Til Bihta
- Tola Nawada
- Udaipur
