= Gujepur =

- Village
- Location in Kanpur, Uttar Pradesh, India Gujepur (India)
- Coordinates: 26.898796°N 80.011603°E
- Country: India
- State: Uttar Pradesh
- District: Kanpur Nagar

Population (2011 Census of India)
  - Total: 2,410

Languages
  - Official: Hindi
- Time zone: UTC+5:30 (IST)
- PIN: 209202
- Vehicle registration: UP-78

Gujepur (Hindi:गूजेपुर) is a village and Gram panchayat in Bilhaur Tehsil, Kanpur Nagar district, Uttar Pradesh, India. Its village code is 149904. As per 2011 Census of India report the population of the village is 2,410 where 1,307 are men and 1,103 are women. The village is located 70 km towards North from District headquarters Kanpur.
