= Agarwal Mandi =

Aggarwal Mandi Tatiri
- Town
- Location in Uttar Pradesh, India
- Coordinates: 28°57′37″N 77°15′22″E
- Country: India
- State: Uttar Pradesh
- District: Baghpat

Government
  - Type: Nagar Panchayat

Population (2001)
  - Total: 12,398

Languages
  - Official: Hindi
- Time zone: UTC+5:30 (IST)
- 0121: 250601

Tatiri (full name Aggarwal Mandi Tatiri) is a town and a nagar panchayat in Baghpat district in the Indian state of Uttar Pradesh. The distance between Aggarwal Mandi Tatiri and Baghpat is 5km. Tatiri is connected to two districts: Baghpat and Meerut, via National Highway 334B. 5km west is State Highway 57, which connects to New Delhi, Baghpat, Baraut, Shamli, and Saharanpur.

== Demographics ==
As of the 2001 India census, Aggarwal Mandi had a population of 12,398. Males constitute 53% of the population and females 47%. Aggarwal Mandi has an average literacy rate of 90%, higher than the national average of 59.5%; with 60% of the males and 40% of females literate. 15% of the population is under 6 years of age.

Religions in Agarwal Mandi
Religion	Percent
Hindus	75%
Muslims	22%
Christians	0.2%
Others†	2.8%
Distribution of religions †Includes Sikhs (0.2%), Buddhists (<0.2%).

== Transport ==
It is well connected with Delhi, Saharanpur, and Haridwar through a railway network which is also used by its nearby villages. The nearby National Highway (NH-334B) connects Sonipat - Baghpat - Tatiri - Meerut - Garh. 5km north, SH-57 is located between Delhi to Saharanpur via Baghpat, and 40km east is NH-58 which also connects Deli, Saharanpur and Haridwar via Ghaziabad, Meerut, Muzzafarnagar, and Roorkee. Railway and Buses are main transport for this Town.Delhi-Dehradun expressway is the new route passing through the town ,with exit of the expressway is near the town on the Baghpat-Meerut national highway.

== Medical facilities ==
A government hospital has been functioning since 1970. The Government Medical Center is relatively outdated, thought the present Uttar Pradesh state government have plans to modernize the currently available facilities. The local Jain community is also running a hospital. There are also many clinics by renowned doctors in the town. A private hospital is also running named as Sarvodaya Hospital having MBBS (Bachelor of Medicine, Bachelor of Surgery) doctor staff.
