= Dariyapur Bilhaur =

- Village
- Location in Kanpur, Uttar Pradesh, India Dariyapur Bilhaur (India)
- Coordinates: 26.79°N 80.08°E
- Country: India
- State: Uttar Pradesh
- District: Kanpur Nagar

Population (2011 Census of India)
  - Total: 1,734

Languages
  - Official: Hindi
- Time zone: UTC+5:30 (IST)
- PIN: 209202
- Vehicle registration: UP-78

Dariyapur Bilhaur is a village and Gram panchayat in Bilhaur Tehsil, Kanpur Nagar district, Uttar Pradesh, India. It is located 53 km towards North from Kanpur City. As per 2011 Census of India report the population of the village is 1,734 where 883 are men and 851 are women.
