= Halpura =

- Village
- Location in Kanpur, Uttar Pradesh, India Halpura (India)
- Coordinates: 26.921025°N 80.000370°E
- Country: India
- State: Uttar Pradesh
- District: Kanpur Nagar

Population (2011 Census of India)
  - Total: 1,924

Languages
  - Official: Hindi
- Time zone: UTC+5:30 (IST)
- PIN: 209202
- Vehicle registration: UP-78
- Website: www.halpura.com

Halpura (Hindi:हलपुरा) is a village and Gram panchayat in Bilhaur Tehsil, Kanpur Nagar district, Uttar Pradesh, India. Its village code is 209202. As per 2011 Census of India report the population of the village is 1924 where 1042 are men and 882 are women.
