= Northern Railway Colony =

Coordinates: 9.2167°N 1.8500°W

- census town
- Interactive map of Northern Railway Colony
- Country: India
- State: Uttar Pradesh
- District: Kanpur Nagar

Population (2001)
  - Total: 29,708

Languages
  - Official: Hindi
- Time zone: UTC+5:30 (IST)

Northern Railway Colony is a census town in Kanpur Nagar district in the Indian state of Uttar Pradesh.

== Demographics ==
As of 2001 India census, Northern Railway Colony had a population of 29,708. Males constitute 56% of the population and females 44%. Northern Railway Colony has an average literacy rate of 67%, higher than the national average of 59.5%: male literacy is 73%, and female literacy is 59%. In Northern Railway Colony, 12% of the population is under 6 years of age.
