= Sikahra Hardaspur =

Village in Uttar Pradesh, India

- Village
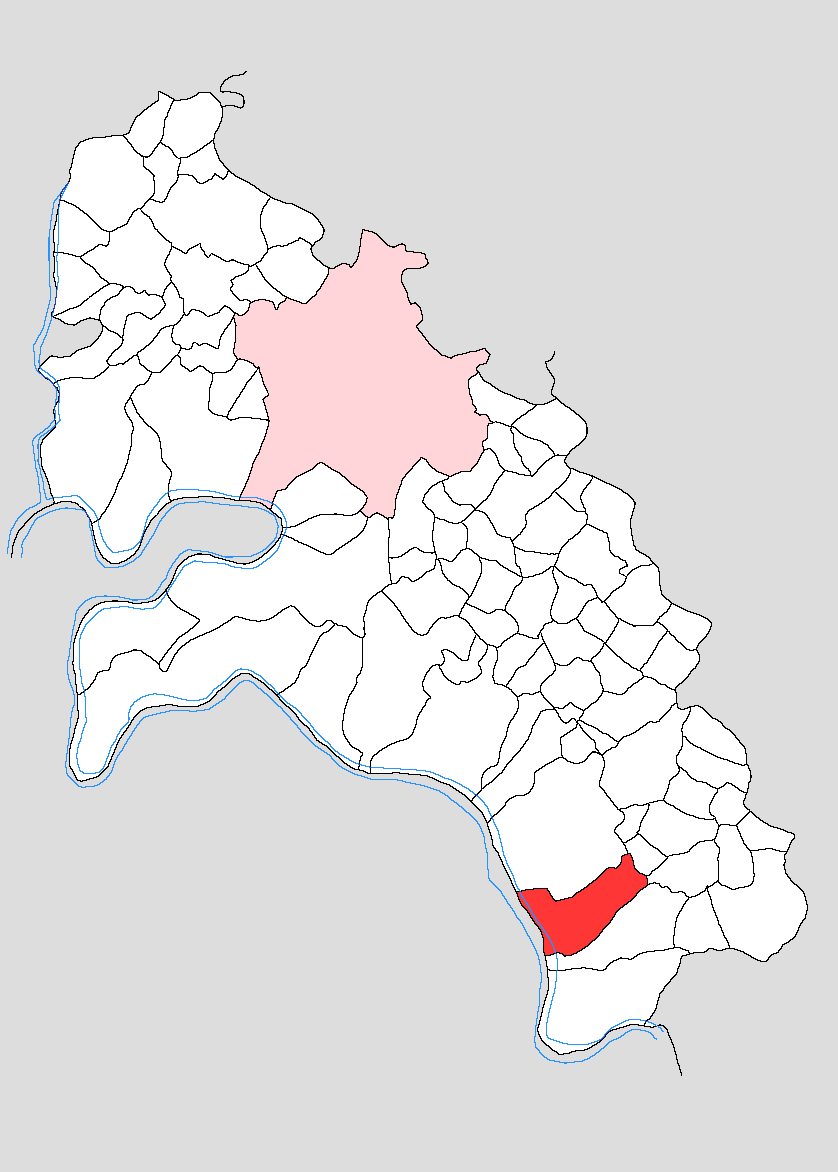
- Map showing Sikahra Hardaspur in Firozabad block

- Location in Uttar Pradesh, India
- Coordinates: 27.0256°N 78.46569°E
- Country: India
- State: Uttar Pradesh
- District: Firozabad
- Tehsil: Firozabad

Area
  - Total: 4.393 km^{2} (1.696 sq mi)

Population (2011)
  - Total: 3,273
  - Density: 745.0/km^{2} (1,930/sq mi)
- Time zone: UTC+5:30 (IST)
- PIN: 283203

Sikahra Hardaspur (Sikahrā Hardāspur) is a village in Firozabad block of Firozabad district, Uttar Pradesh. It is located southeast of Firozabad, near the Yamuna, with part of the Firozabad Reserved Forest between the village and the river. As of 2011, Sikahra Hardaspur had a population of 3,273, in 480 households.

== Geography ==
Sikahra Hardaspur is located southeast of Firozabad and northeast of the Yamuna river. To the southwest is a densely forested tract that belongs to the Firozabad Reserved Forest. Babul is the predominant species of tree in this area. Farmland surrounds Sikahra Hardaspur on the north, east, and southeast. There are several prominent tanks in the vicinity: one in the village itself, on the northeast side; one to the east, close to the hamlet of Khera; and a third a bit to the southeast along a small road to the village of Allahdadpur. To the northeast of Sikahra Hardaspur is the village of Sengai, while to the northwest is the market village of Jalalpur.

== Demographics ==
As of 2011, Sikahra Hardaspur had a population of 3,273, in 480 households. This population was 54.0% male (1,767) and 46.0% female (1,506). The 0–6 age group numbered 535 (290 male and 245 female), making up 16.3% of the total population. 154 residents were members of Scheduled Castes, or 4.7% of the total.

The 1981 census recorded Sikahra Hardaspur (as "Sikhara Hardaspur") as having a population of 1,759 people (980 male and 779 female), in 301 households and 293 physical houses.

The 1961 census recorded Sikahra Hardaspur as comprising 3 hamlets, with a total population of 1,721 people (962 male and 759 female), in 225 households and 188 physical houses. The area of the village was given as 1,404 acres.

== Infrastructure ==
As of 2011, Sikahra Hardaspur had 2 primary schools and 1 primary health sub centre. Drinking water was provided by tap, hand pump, and tube well/bore well; there were no public toilets. The village did not have a post office or public library; there was at least some access to electricity for residential and agricultural (but not commercial) purposes. Streets were made of both kachcha and pakka materials.
