= Garh =

- Village
- Location in Kanpur, Uttar Pradesh, India Garh (India)
- Coordinates: 26.80°N 80.08°E
- Country: India
- State: Uttar Pradesh
- District: Kanpur Nagar

Population (2011 Census of India)
  - Total: 276

Languages
  - Official: Hindi
- Time zone: UTC+5:30 (IST)
- PIN: 209210
- Vehicle registration: UP-78

Garh is a village in Bedipur Gram panchayat in Bilhaur Tehsil, Kanpur Nagar district, Uttar Pradesh, India. Village Code is 149974.
