= Choubepur Kalan =

- Town
- Location in Uttar Pradesh, India
- Coordinates: 26°37′26″N 80°11′28″E
- Country: India
- State: Uttar Pradesh
- District: Kanpur Nagar

Population (2001)
  - Total: 8,352

Languages
  - Official: Hindi
- Time zone: UTC+5:30 (IST)

Choubepur Kalan is a census town in Kanpur district in the state of Uttar Pradesh, India.

== Demographics ==
As of 2001 India census, Choubepur Kalan had a population of 8,352. Males constitute 52% of the population and females 48%. Choubepur Kalan has an average literacy rate of 60%, higher than the national average of 59.5%; with male literacy of 64% and female literacy of 55%. 16% of the population is under 6 years of age.
