= Aronj =

Village in Uttar Pradesh, India

- Village
- Location in Uttar Pradesh, India
- Coordinates: 27.10828°N 78.54901°E
- Country: India
- State: Uttar Pradesh
- District: Firozabad
- Tehsil: Shikohabad

Area
  - Total: 6.877 km^{2} (2.655 sq mi)

Population (2011)
  - Total: 5,066
  - Density: 736.7/km^{2} (1,908/sq mi)
- Time zone: UTC+5:30 (IST)

Aronj (Āroñj) is a village in Shikohabad block of Firozabad district, Uttar Pradesh. As of 2011, it had a population of 5,066, in 815 households.

== Archaeology ==
During an exploration of what was then Mainpuri district in the late 1970s, the archaeologist L. M. Wahal discovered an archaeological site at Aronj where there were artifacts attributed to the Painted Grey Ware (c. 1200-600 BCE) and Northern Black Polished Ware (c. 700-200 BCE) cultures.

== Demographics ==
As of 2011, Aronj had a population of 5,066, in 245 households. This population was 54.8% male (2,775) and 45.2% female (2,291). The 0–6 age group numbered 784 (435 male and 349 female), making up 15.5% of the total population. 730 residents were members of Scheduled Castes, or 14.4% of the total.

The 1981 census recorded Aronj as having a population of 2,560 people, in 422 households.

The 1961 census recorded Aronj as comprising 6 hamlets, with a total population of 1,665 people (875 male and 790 female), in 319 households and 239 physical houses. The area of the village was given as 1,699 acres.

== Infrastructure ==
As of 2011, Aronj had 1 primary school; it did not have any healthcare facilities. Drinking water was provided by tap and hand pump; there was at least one public toilet. The village had a sub post office and a public library; there was at least some access to electricity for all purposes. Streets were made of both kachcha and pakka materials.
