= Sengai, India =

Village in Uttar Pradesh, India

Sengai
- Village
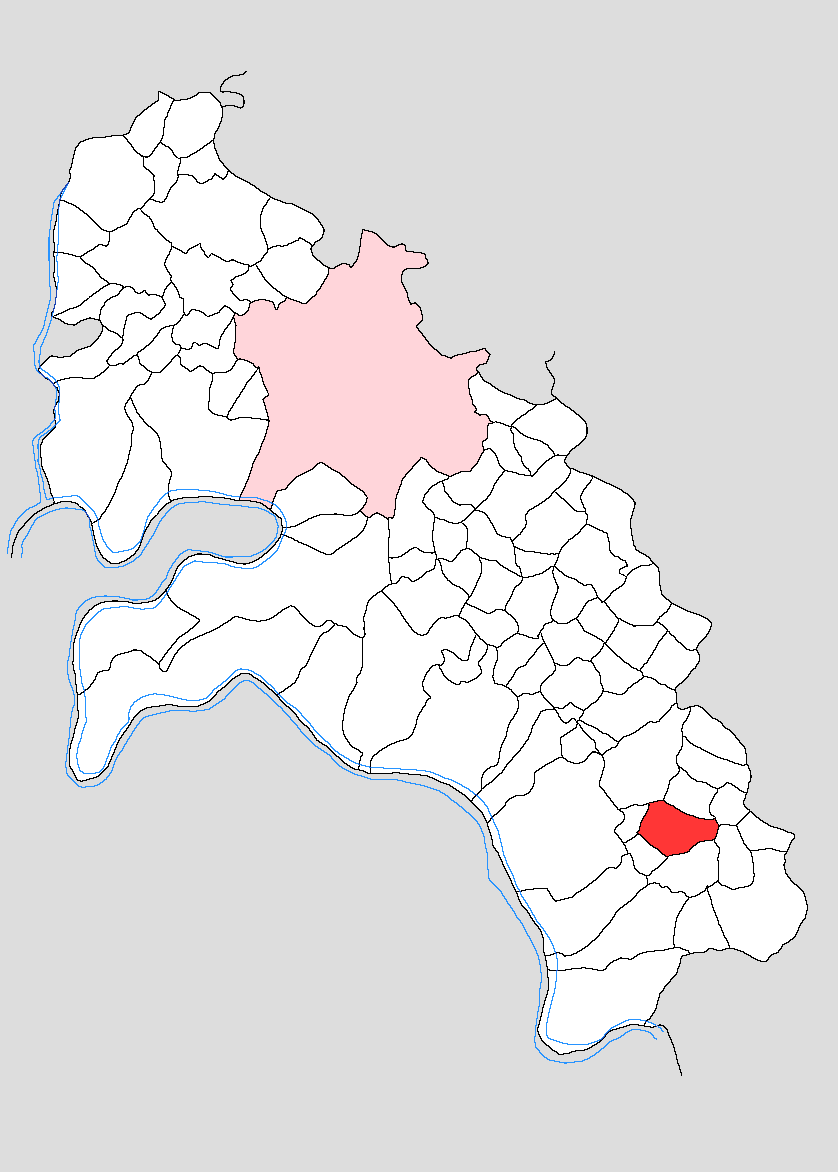
- Map showing Sengai in Firozabad block

- Location in Uttar Pradesh, India
- Coordinates: 27.03851°N 78.48035°E
- Country: India
- State: Uttar Pradesh
- District: Firozabad
- Tehsil: Firozabad

Area
  - Total: 2.579 km^{2} (0.996 sq mi)

Population (2011)
  - Total: 3,123
  - Density: 1,211/km^{2} (3,136/sq mi)
- Time zone: UTC+5:30 (IST)
- PIN: 283203

Sengai (Seṃgaī) is a village in Firozabad block of Firozabad district, Uttar Pradesh. As of 2011, it had a population of 3,123, in 471 households.

== Geography ==
Sengai is located southeast of Firozabad and is basically surrounded by flat farmland. There is a prominent seasonal tank on the east side of the village. The village of Dhakpura is located very close to the west-northwest of Sengai; other nearby villages include Nanpi Pithni to the northeast, Hardaspur Nisfi to the east-southeast, Nargapur to the southeast, and Sikahra Hardaspur to the southwest.

== Demographics ==
As of 2011, Sengai had a population of 3,123, in 471 households. This population was 54.1% male (1,689) and 45.9% female (1,434). The 0–6 age group numbered 565 (294 male and 271 female), making up 18.1% of the total population. 292 residents were members of Scheduled Castes, or 9.3% of the total.

The 1981 census recorded Sengai as having a population of 1,737 people (975 male and 762 female), in 291 households and 288 physical houses.

The 1961 census recorded Sengai as comprising 2 hamlets, with a total population of 1,233 people (680 male and 553 female), in 208 households and 137 physical houses. The area of the village was given as 645 acres.

== Infrastructure ==
As of 2011, Sengai had 1 primary school; it did not have any healthcare facilities. Drinking water was provided by tap, hand pump, and tube well/bore well; there were no public toilets. The village did not have a post office or public library; there was at least some access to electricity for all purposes. Streets were made of both kachcha and pakka materials.
