= Gajana =

- Village
- Location within India
- Coordinates: 22°13′50″N 69°57′19″E
- Country: India
- State: Gujarat
- District: Jamnagar
- Time zone: UTC+5:30 (IST)

Gajana is a small village in Jamnagar district of Gujarat, India. Lalpur is the tehsil of Gajana. Mokhavati river is near the village. There is one primary school. The head of the village is called a Sarpanch, who is elected by the people of the village. The Sarpanch of the village is Manjulaben Kirangiri Goswami.
