= Lakshmi Villa =

- village
- Location in Uttar Pradesh, India Lakshmi Villa (India)
- Coordinates: 26.24°N 80.24°E
- Country: India
- State: Uttar Pradesh

Languages
  - Official: Hindi
- Time zone: UTC+5:30 (IST)

Lakshmi Villa is a village in Kanpur, U.P., India. It is located at 26 degree 24' 54" N 80 degree 24' 17" E.
