= Armapur Estate =

- City
- Location in Uttar Pradesh, India
- Coordinates: 26.460469°N 80.271735°E
- Country: India
- State: Uttar Pradesh
- District: Kanpur Nagar

Population (2011)
  - Total: 15,463

Languages
  - Official: Hindi
- Time zone: UTC+5:30 (IST)
- PIN: 208009

Armapur Estate is a census town in Kanpur Nagar District in the state of Uttar Pradesh, India.

== Demographics ==
As of 2001 India census, Armapur Estate had a population of 20,797. Males constitute 54% of the population and females 46%. Armapur Estate has an average literacy rate of 80%, higher than the national average of 59.5%; with 59% of the males and 41% of females literate. 9% of the population is under 6 years of age. This census town is reserve for only defense personnel.
