= Manikpur, Muzaffarpur =

Manikpur
- village
- Location in Bihar
- Coordinates: 26°02′03″N 85°08′08″E
- Country: India
- State: Bihar
- District: Muzaffarpur

Languages
  - Official: Maithili, Hindi, Bajjika Bhojpuri
- Time zone: UTC+5:30 (IST)
- ISO 3166 code: IN-BR

Manikpur is a village in Muzaffarpur district, Bihar state, India. It is situated on the banks of a Himalayan glacier-fed perennial river, the Baya Nadi River, NH-102 Saraiya. A four lane project Sahebganj to Manikpur is being takenup in September 2025.

It is also known as Manikpur Darbar because of a prominent Bhumihar family commonly known as Singh Gautam family which was started by Babu Kodai Prasad singh and led by his family Babu Rameshwar Prasad Singh ,Babu Ramashray Prasad Singh, Babu Ramavtar prasad singh and grandsons Babu Badri Narayan Singh, Harishankar Prasad Singh and Shaligram Prasad Singh (Lalan babu), who along with their sons, are still a prominent name in the region. Daughter in law of Babu Ramashray prashad singh became the first Chairman of nagar panchayat.

== History ==
Manikpur donated many acres of land to the landless in their region and many acres to the government for making high, middle and primary schools, hospital and Gandak project in their region.
