= Sarh, Kanpur =

Sarh, Kanpur Sarh
- town
- Location in Uttar Pradesh, India
- Coordinates: 26°15′0″N 80°21′0″E
- Country: India
- State: Uttar Pradesh
- District: Kanpur

Languages
  - Official: Hindi
- Time zone: UTC+5:30 (IST)
- Vehicle registration: UP-
- Coastline: 0 kilometres (0 mi)

Sarh is a town in Kanpur district in the state of Uttar Pradesh, India.

== Transport ==
Sarh is well connected by rail and road.

== Geography ==
Sarh is located at 26°15′0″N 80°21′0″E. It has an average elevation of 123 meters (406 feet).
