= Jalalpur, Firozabad =

Village in Uttar Pradesh, India

Jalalpur
- Village
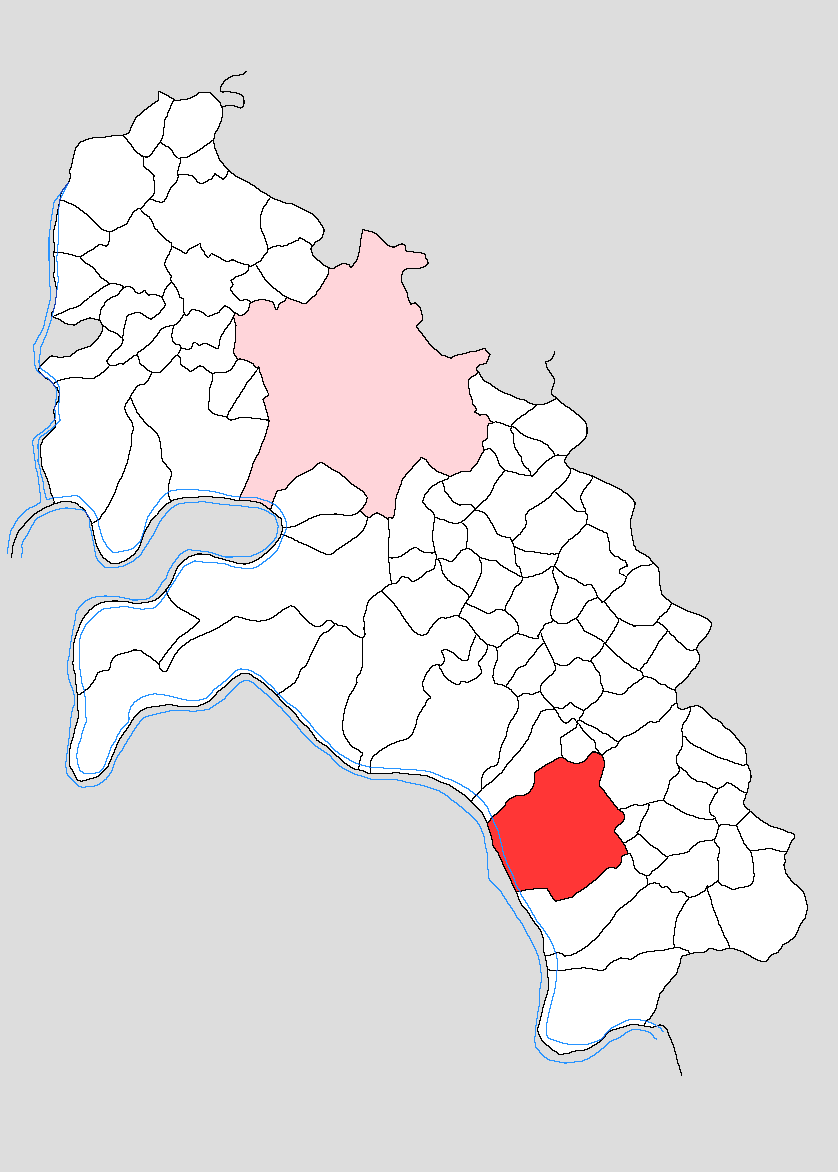
- Map showing Jalalpur in Firozabad block

- Location in Uttar Pradesh, India
- Coordinates: 27.0417°N 78.46016°E
- Country: India
- State: Uttar Pradesh
- District: Firozabad
- Tehsil: Firozabad

Area
  - Total: 10.982 km^{2} (4.240 sq mi)

Population (2011)
  - Total: 5,478
  - Density: 498.8/km^{2} (1,292/sq mi)
- Time zone: UTC+5:30 (IST)

Jalalpur (Jalālpur) is a village in Firozabad block of Firozabad district, Uttar Pradesh, India. Located by the Yamuna river and just off the Agra-Lucknow Expressway, it is the site of a small forest reserve. As of 2011, it had a population of 5,478, in 851 households.

== Geography and forest reserve ==
Jalalpur is located by the bank of the Yamuna river and the Agra-Lucknow Expressway. The 2011 census recorded 34 hectares of forest cover on Jalalpur's village lands, which in total covered about 1,098 hectares. An additional 5-acre (about 2-hectare) "micro-forest" has since been planted on village lands by the riverbank. It began in 2018 as a one-acre area and had expanded to 5 acres by July 2019. Current tree species include pipal, banyan, neem, and lemon, as well as a few mango trees.

== Demographics ==
As of 2011, Jalalpur had a population of 5,478, in 851 households. This population was 55.8% male (3,057) and 44.2% female (2,421). The 0-6 age group numbered 875 (477 male and 398 female), making up 16.0% of the total population. 676 residents were members of Scheduled Castes, or 12.3% of the total.

The 1981 census recorded Jalalpur as having a population of 3,305 people (1,853 male and 1,452 female), in 533 households and 526 physical houses.

The 1961 census recorded Jalalpur as comprising 8 hamlets, with a total population of 2,647 people (1,449 male and 1,198 female), in 443 households and 315 physical houses. The area of the village was given as 2,730 acres and it had a post office and medical practitioner at that point.

== Infrastructure ==
As of 2011, Jalalpur had 2 primary schools and 1 primary health centre. Drinking water was provided by tap, hand pump, and tube well/borehole; there were no public toilets. The village had a sub post office but no public library; there was at least some access to electricity for residential and agricultural (but not commercial) purposes. Streets were made of both kachcha and pakka materials.
