= Datauli, Firozabad =

Village in Uttar Pradesh, India

Datauli
- Village
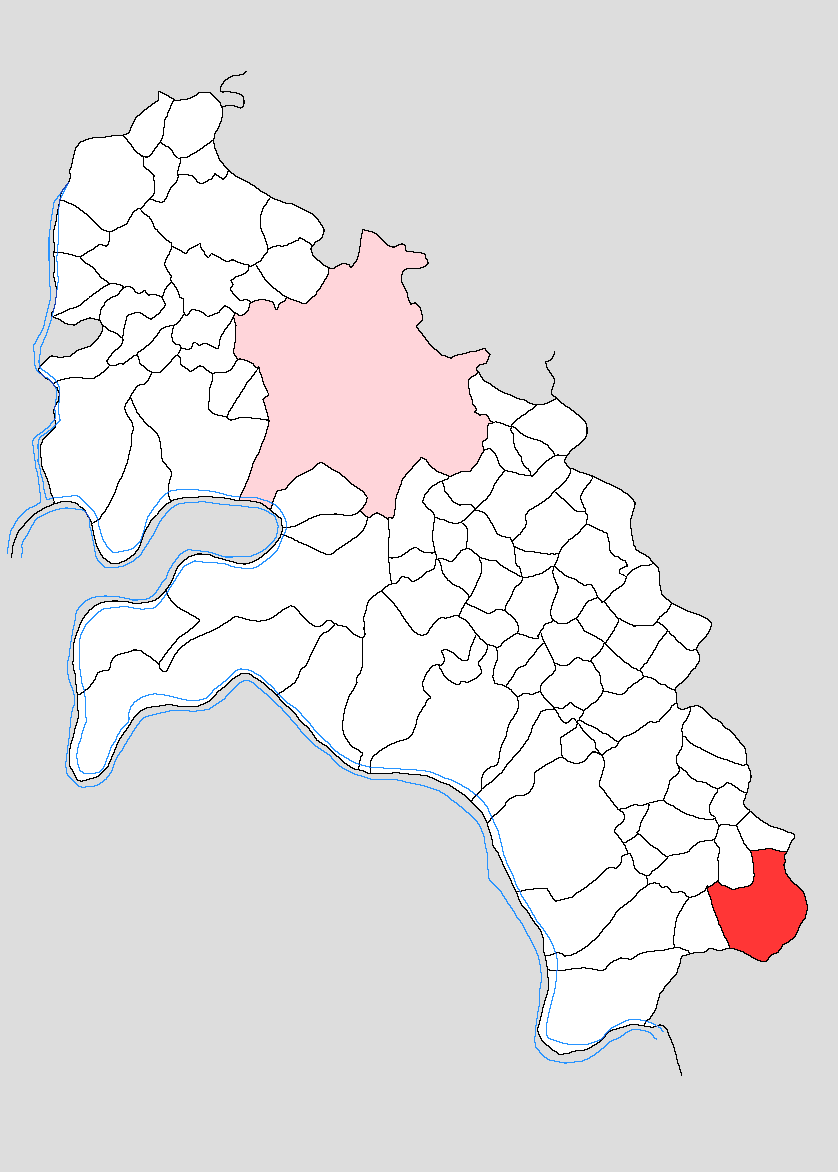
- Map showing Datauli in Firozabad block

- Location in Uttar Pradesh, India
- Coordinates: 27.02172°N 78.51171°E
- Country: India
- State: Uttar Pradesh
- District: Firozabad
- Tehsil: Firozabad

Area
  - Total: 5.630 km^{2} (2.174 sq mi)

Population (2011)
  - Total: 3,452
  - Density: 613.1/km^{2} (1,588/sq mi)
- Time zone: UTC+5:30 (IST)
- PIN: 322803

Datauli is a village in Firozabad block of Firozabad district, Uttar Pradesh. As of 2011, it had a population of 3,452, in 541 households.

== Demographics ==
As of 2011, Datauli had a population of 3,452, in 541 households. This population was 52.5% male (1,813) and 47.5% female (1,639). The 0–6 age group numbered 521 (281 male and 240 female), making up 15.1% of the total population. 99 residents were members of Scheduled Castes, or 2.9% of the total.

The 1981 census recorded Datauli (as "Datawali") as having a population of 2,545 people (1,390 male and 1,155 female), in 411 households and 408 physical houses.

The 1961 census recorded Datauli as comprising 1 hamlet, with a total population of 1,911 people (974 male and 937 female), in 360 households and 315 physical houses. The area of the village was given as 1,494 acres and it had a post office at that point.

== Infrastructure ==
As of 2011, Datauli had 1 primary school and 1 primary healthcare centre. Drinking water was provided by tap, hand pump, and tube well/bore well; there were no public toilets. The village had a sub post office but no public library; there was at least some access to electricity for residential and agricultural (but not commercial) purposes. Streets were made of both kachcha and pakka materials.
