= Saraiya =

saraiya
- Block
- Country: India
- State: Bihar
- District: Muzaffarpur

Languages
  - Official: Maithili, Hindi, Bhojpuri
- Time zone: UTC+5:30 (IST)
- ISO 3166 code: IN-BR

Saraiya is a block in Manikpur village Muzaffarpur district, Bihar state, a village in Gorakhpur, Uttar Pradesh, and in Bharatpur, Rajasthan, India.
