= Shikohabad =

- City
- Location in Uttar Pradesh, India
- Coordinates: 27.1°N 78.6°E
- Country: India
- State: Uttar Pradesh
- Founder: Dara-Shikoh
- Named for: Dara-Shikoh (Shikoh-abad)

Government
  - Type: Democratic

Area
  - Total: 750.11 km^{2} (289.62 sq mi)
  - Water: 31 km^{2} (12 sq mi)
  - Rank: 4
- Elevation: 163 m (535 ft)

Population (2011)
  - Total: 107,404
  - Rank: 3
  - Density: 143.18/km^{2} (370.85/sq mi)

Languages
  - Official: Hindi
- Time zone: UTC+5:30 (IST)
- PIN: 283135
- Telephone code: +91-5676
- Vehicle registration: UP-83

Shikohabad is a city and a municipal board in the Firozabad district of the Indian state of Uttar Pradesh.

Bateshwar, a famous Hindu pilgrimage centre dedicated to Shiva, and also a famous Jain Tirth on the banks of River Yamuna, is situated 22 kilometres south of Shikohabad

The city lies in the cultural region of Braj and the local language is Brajbhasha.

== Geography ==
Shikohabad is located at 27.1°N 78.6°E. It has an average elevation of 163 m (535 ft). The river Sirsa flows between the main city and pass out the railway station.

== History ==
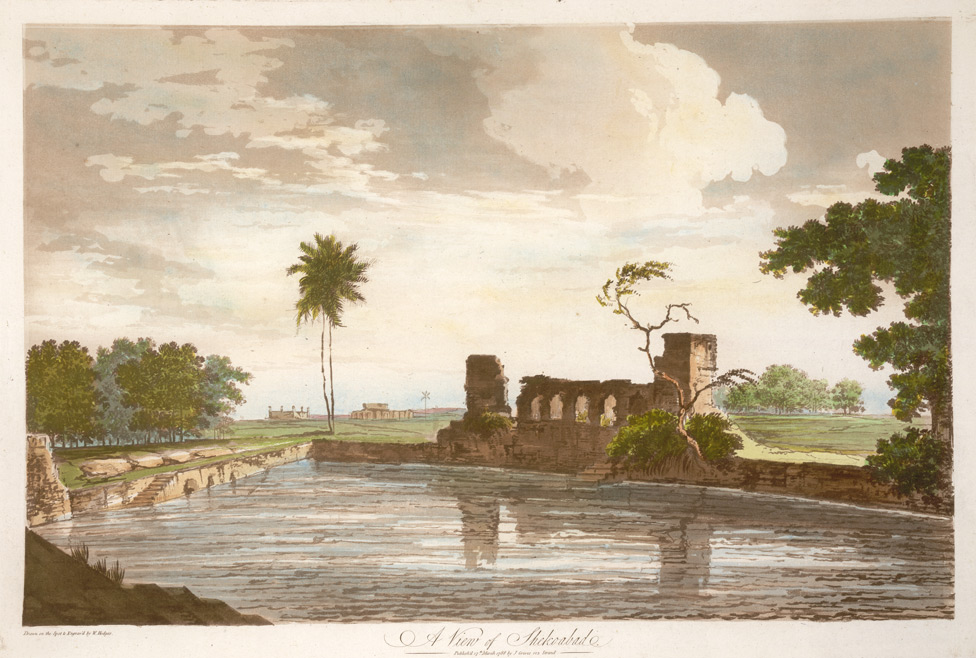
A View of Shekoabad, Dara Shukoh's hunting lodge outside Agra, ca. 1783, by William Hodges

The old name of Shikohabad was Mohammad Mah (the name still exists as Mohmmad mah near Tahsil and Kotwali). Shikohabad is named after Dara Shikoh, the eldest brother of Emperor Aurangzeb. In its present form, the town has hardly any recognisable evidence of that era. Shikohabad was ruled under the estate of Labhowa from 1794 to 1880. As written by Matthew Atmore, Jadaun Rajputs are here in huge numbers and other cities in Firozabad. The Rajas of Labhowa of Jadon, later Jhala Dynasty were well known to the Mughal rulers and their generals and along with them controlled over 100 square kilometres (39 sq mi) of this area. According to British historian Matthew Atmore Sherring Phatak Ahirs alone have 21 villages in Shikohabad.

== Accessibility ==
Shikohabad is well connected with other cities by roadways as well as railways. This city is connects with cities like Agra, Firozabad, Mathura, New Delhi, Noida, Etawah, Kanpur, Allahabad, Varanasi, Patna, Kolkata by National Highway 19 (formerly known as NH-2) and it also connects through Agra Lucknow Expressway through which is connected to Agra, Lucknow, Kanpur Mainpuri, Etawah. It is 66 km (41 mi) from Agra, 22 km (14 mi) from Firozabad , 66 km (41 mi) from Etawah, 50 km (31 mi) from Mainpuri and 296 km (184 mi) from New Delhi via Yamuna Expressway. Shikohabad Railway Station is located on Delhi Mugalsarai main line of North Central Railway having direct connection to Delhi, Kolkata, Mumbai, Agra, Etawah, Kanpur, Jaipur, Lucknow, Mainpuri and Farrukhabad. It is also well connected by road with all major cities of the state and region. It is further connected to Etah via SH-85 and to Mainpuri via SH-84.

== Demographics ==
Historical population
Year	Pop.	±%
1901	10,798	—
1911	11,383	+5.4%
1921	10,374	−8.9%
1931	11,865	+14.4%
1941	14,061	+18.5%
1951	19,502	+38.7%
1961	23,458	+20.3%
1971	31,442	+34.0%
1981	47,083	+49.7%
1991	62,829	+33.4%
2001	88,161	+40.3%
2011	107,404	+21.8%
Source: 2011 Census of India

As of the 2011 census, Shikohabad had a population of 107,404, in 18,622 households. This population was 52.9% male (56,794) and 47.1% female (50,610). The 0-6 age group numbered 13,458 (7,457 male and 6,091 female), or 12.5% of the total population. 14,798 residents were members of Scheduled Castes, or 13.8% of the total. The city's literacy rate was 80.0% (counting only people age 7 and up).

== Education ==
As of 2009, Shikohabad has 88 schools teaching at the primary level and 16 schools teaching at the secondary level. There were no public libraries; the closest was in Firozabad.

== List of villages in Shikohabad block ==
The following 107 villages are counted as part of Shikohabad CD block:

1. Abbaspur
2. Adhampur
3. Aimadidauli
4. Angadpur
5. Armarajat
6. Aronj
7. Asdeomai Nurpur
8. Aslempur Biran
9. Asraoli
10. Asva
11. Atapur
12. Badanpur Karkha
13. Bahoranpur
14. Bakalpur
15. Bariyarmau
16. Basdeomai
17. Bharhaipura
18. Bidarkha
19. Birhammadbad Lachhapur
20. Burhabharatra
21. Burharai
22. Chamrauli
23. Chehari
24. Chharichhapper
25. Chhichhamai
26. Chitaoli
27. Dahini
28. Dakhinara
29. Dargapur Mohanipur
30. Dhadhau
31. Dhanpura
32. Dharau Himmatpur
33. Dikhtauli
34. Diwaichi
35. Fatehpur Karkha
36. Gagai
37. Galamai
38. Garhi
39. Govindpur
40. Haibatpur Karkha
41. Harganpur
42. Hariha
43. Indumai
44. Itauli
45. Jafrabad
46. Jalalpur Marghati
47. Jamalipur
48. Jaslai
49. Jeora
50. Jhangirpurgalrai
51. Jijauli
52. Kalyanpur Angadpur
53. Karanpur
54. Khushalpur
55. Kirthara Mohammedpur
56. Kishanpur Armarajat
57. Kishanpur Mohammadabad
58. Kutakpur Harganpur
59. Latumai
60. Maiyamai
61. Makhanpur (census town)
62. Meoli
63. Mohabbataheer
64. Mohammadpur Bahari
65. Mohammadpur Jhum Jhum
66. Mohammadpur Labhaua
67. Mohammadpur Sarai Jabai
68. Mohammdpur Nawada
69. Mohinipur
70. Mubarakpur Khas
71. Nagla Balua
72. Nagla Chanda
73. Nagla Saidlal
74. Nagla Umer
75. Naglabajdar
76. Naoli
77. Nasirpur
78. Naushehra
79. Nihalpur
80. Nivkheria
81. Nizampur Garhuma
82. Owari
83. Rahal
84. Rahchati
85. Rajopura
86. Rajpur Balai
87. Ramnager Rajpur Balai
88. Ranua Khera
89. Rapari
90. Rasulpur
91. Rithara
92. Rudhau
93. Rupaspur
94. Salempur Bariar Mau
95. Samonhon
96. Sarhupur
97. Saurakh
98. Sekhupur Garhi
99. Shahpur
100. Shahzadpur Didauli
101. Shaihajalpur
102. Sikandarpur
103. Sujawalpur
104. Tara Mai
105. Tatarpur
106. Ubati
107. Urmara Kirar
{bar percent|Others†|black|1.0}}

Religions in Shikohabad
Religion	Percent
Hindus	79.71%
Muslims	18.38%
Jains	1.19%
Sikhs	0.2%
Distribution of religions IncludesBuddhists (<0.2%).
