= Bilhaur =

- town
- Location in Uttar Pradesh, India
- Coordinates: 26.85°N 80.08°E
- Country: India
- State: Uttar Pradesh
- District: Kanpur Nagar

Government
  - Type: Municipal corporation
  - Body: Nagar Palika
- Elevation: 116 m (381 ft)

Population (2011)
  - Total: 20,493

Languages
  - Official: Hindi
- Time zone: UTC+5:30 (IST)

Bilhaur is a town and a municipal board in Kanpur Nagar district which is situated in the state of Uttar Pradesh, India.

== Demographics ==
As of 2001 India census, Bilhaur had a population of 18,056. Males constitute 53% of the population and females 47%. Bilhaur has an average literacy rate of 53%, lower than the national average of 59.5%; with male literacy of 56% and female literacy of 49%. 15% of the population is under 6 years of age. Most of the community living here are Kurmi khsatriya's & Brahmins and Hinduism is the main religion.

== General information ==
The original name of the town was Bilva Hari, but it was pronounced Bilhaur in local dialect and that name came to be officially accepted. Agriculture and animal husbandry are important to the local economy. There are two local Inter colleges, and the Indus Institute of Technology and Management. Bilhaur Inter College celebrated its golden jubilee on 13/03/2012. Madar Sharif is a place of pilgrimage situated on the Isan river. And Dr.Shubhendra And Dr. Harshit Sharma was also born here and a famous orthopaedic surgeon Dr. S. Mustaq Ahmed.

== Villages ==
- Dariyapur Bilhaur
- Gadanpur Ahar
- Gadanpur Chorsa

== See also ==
- Bilhaur (Lok Sabha constituency)
- Raypur
