= Kanpur Nagar district =

Coordinates: 26°27′36″N 80°19′48″E

- District of Uttar Pradesh
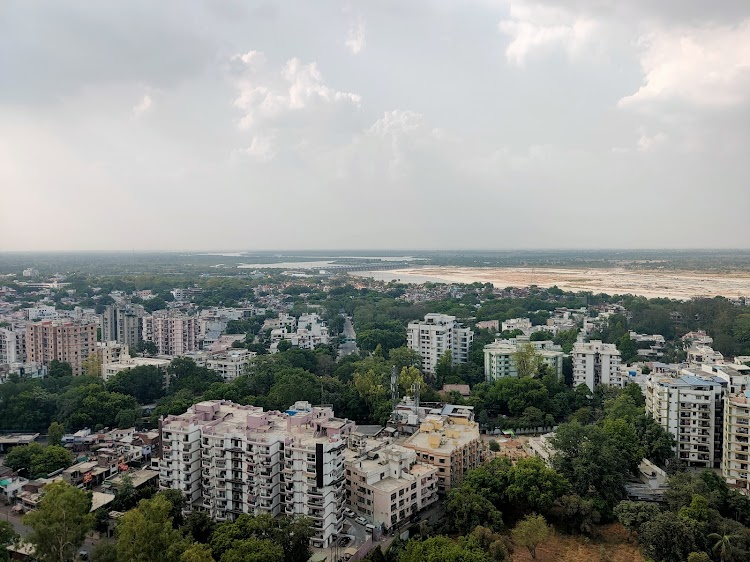
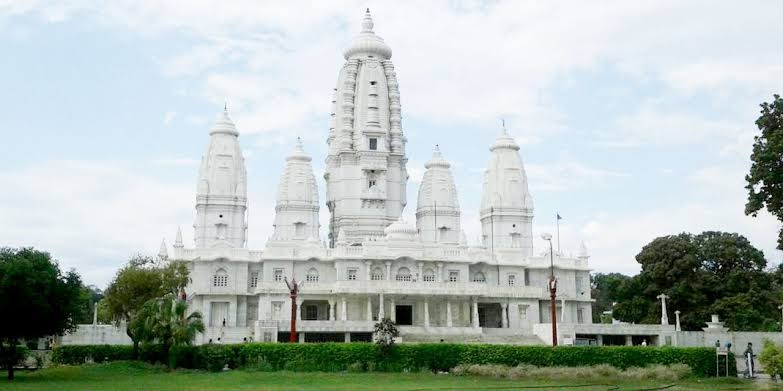
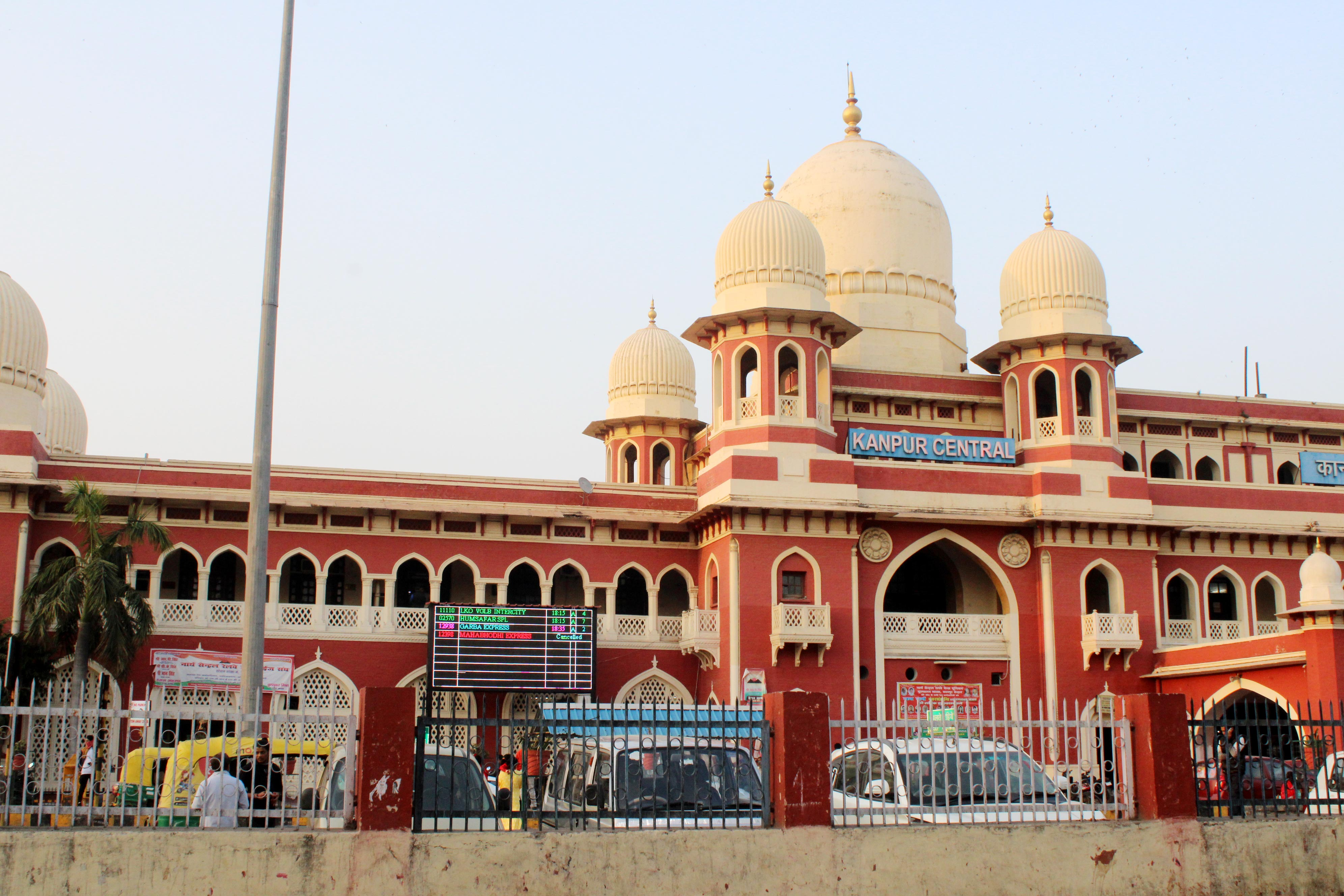
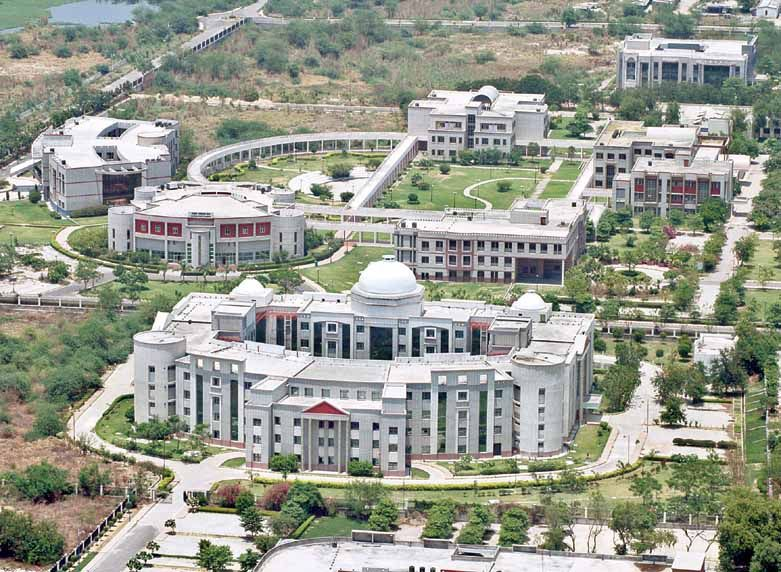
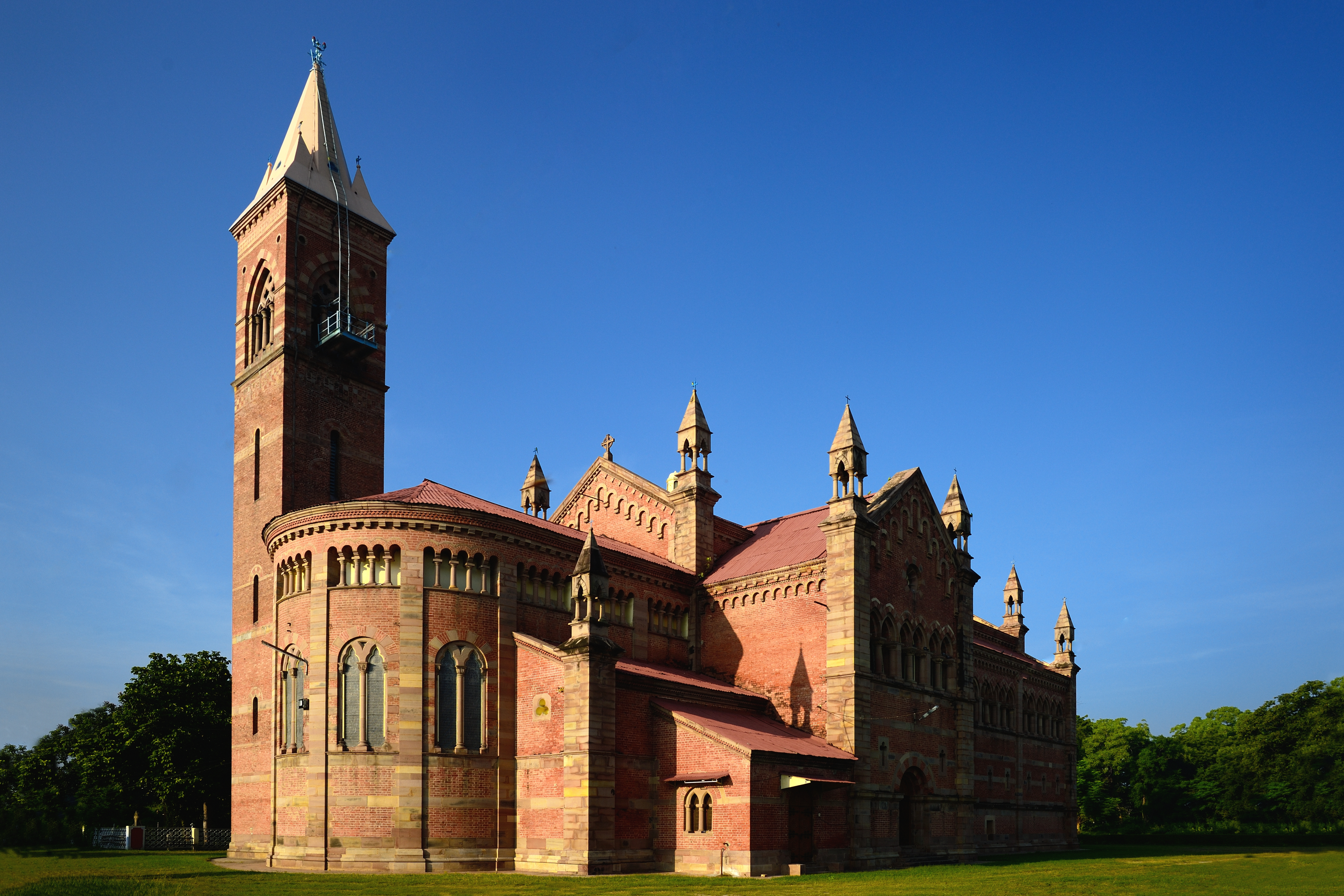
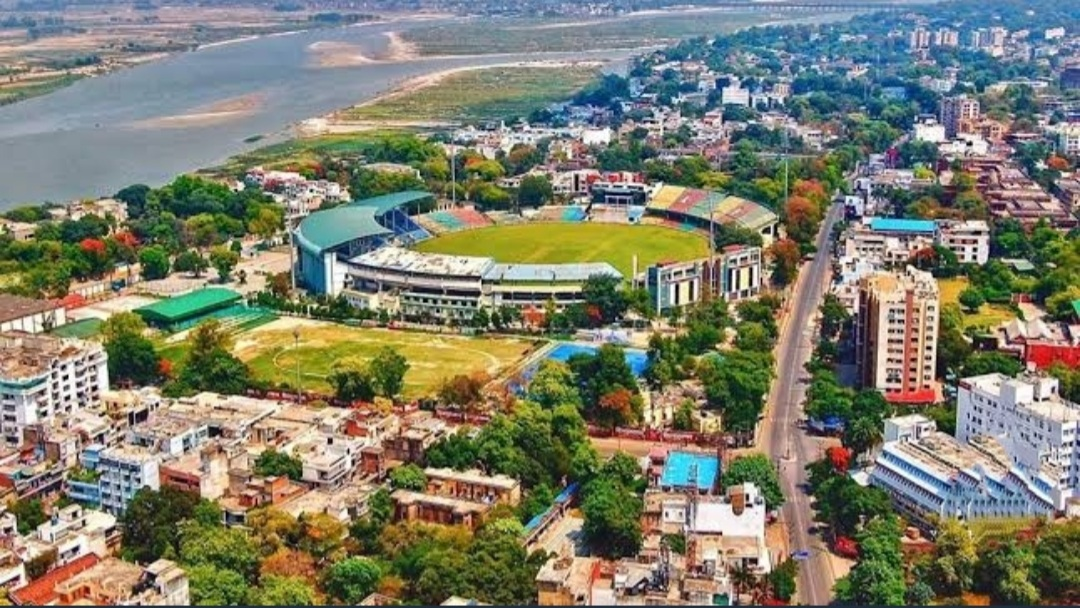
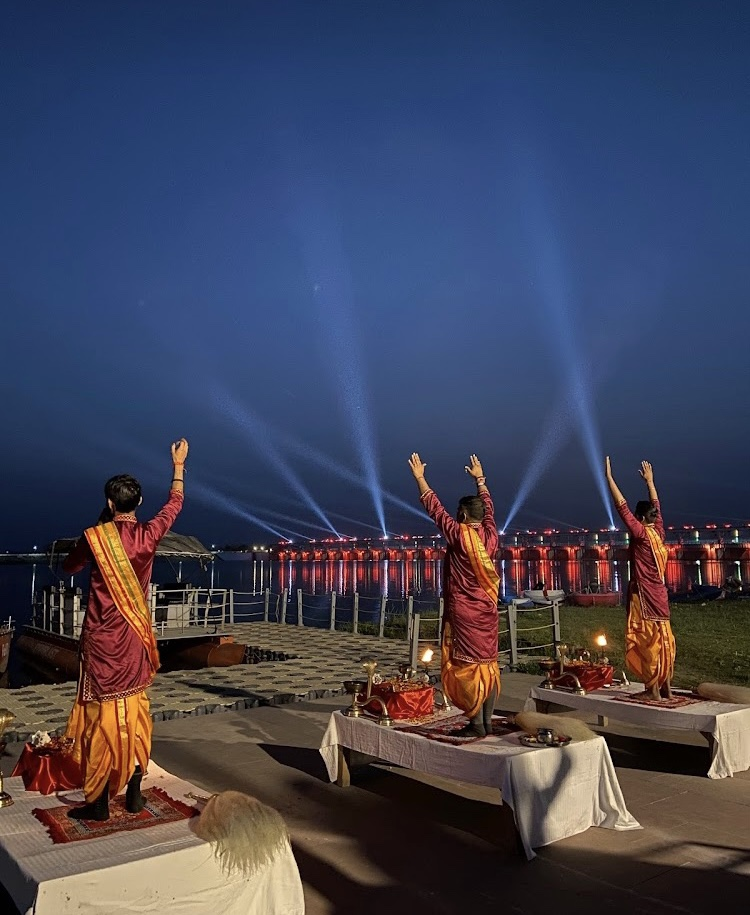
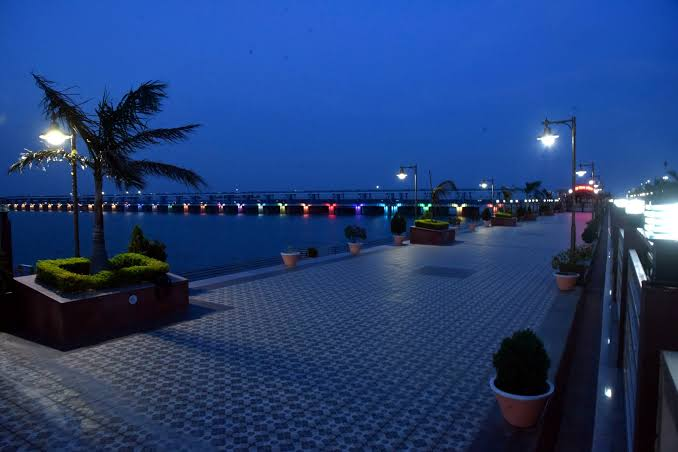
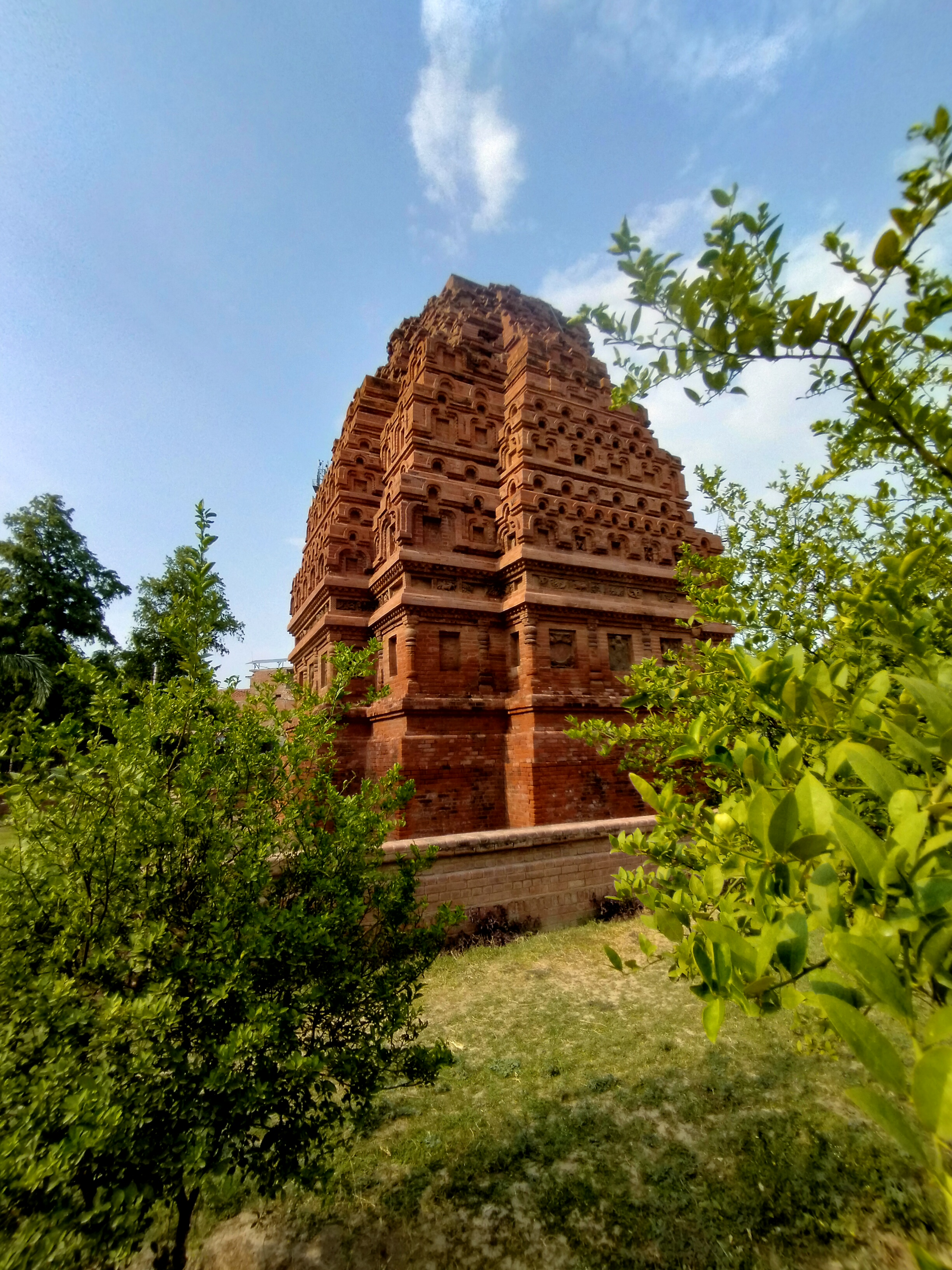
- Skyline Of City JK Temple Kanpur Central Railway Station Kanpur University Kanpur Memorial Church Green Park Stadium Ganga Aarti At Kanpur Ganga Riverfront Kanpur Bhitargaon Temple Kanpur

- Location of Kanpur Nagar district in Uttar Pradesh
- Country: India
- State: Uttar Pradesh
- Division: Kanpur
- Headquarters: Kanpur
- Tehsils: Kanpur, Bilhaur, Ghatampur,

Government
  - Lok Sabha constituencies: 1. Kanpur (Lok Sabha constituency)- Kidwai Nagar, Cantt., Sishamau, Arya Nagar, Govindnagar; 2. Misrikh (Lok Sabha constituency)- Bilhaur; 3. Akbarpur (Lok Sabha constituency)- Ghatampur, Kalyanpur, Maharajpur, Bithoor
  - Vidhan Sabha constituencies: 1. Sishamau; 2. Arya Nagar; 3. Kidwai Nagar; 4. Govind Nagar; 5. Kanpur Cantonment; 6. Bithoor; 7. Kalyanpur; 8. Maharajpur; 9. Ghatampur; 10. Bilhaur

Area
  - Total: 3,155 km^{2} (1,218 sq mi)

Population (2011)
  - Total: 4,581,268
  - Density: 1,452/km^{2} (3,761/sq mi)
  - Urban: 3,015,645

Demographics
  - Literacy: 79.65 %
- Time zone: UTC+05:30 (IST)
- Major highways: NH 2
- Website: kanpurnagar.nic.in

Kanpur Nagar district, meaning Urban Kanpur District is one of the districts of the Uttar Pradesh state of India. It is a part of Kanpur division and its district headquarters is Kanpur. Kanpur was formerly spelled Cawnpore.

== Notable people ==
- Kavi Bhushan an Indian poet in the courts of the Bundela King Chhatrasal and the Maratha King Shivaji. Bhushan resided in the Tikwapur village in Ghatampur tehsil of Kanpur district, Uttar Pradesh.

== Demographics ==
Historical population
Year	Pop.	±% p.a.
1901	860,367	—
1911	780,691	−0.97%
1921	785,046	+0.06%
1931	828,506	+0.54%
1941	1,063,602	+2.53%
1951	1,325,778	+2.23%
1961	1,647,150	+2.19%
1971	2,099,164	+2.45%
1981	2,655,191	+2.38%
1991	3,253,572	+2.05%
2001	4,167,999	+2.51%
2011	4,581,268	+0.95%

Religions in Kanpur Nagar district (2011)
Religion	Percent
Hinduism	82.78%
Islam	15.73%
Sikhism	0.65%
Other or not stated	0.84%
Distribution of religions

According to the 2011 census Kanpur Nagar district has a population of 4,581,268, roughly equal to the nation of Costa Rica or the US state of Louisiana. This gives it a ranking of 32nd in India (out of a total of 640). The district has a population density of 1,449 inhabitants per square kilometre (3,750/sq mi) . Its population growth rate over the decade 2001-2011 was 9.72%. Kanpur Nagar has a sex ratio of 852 females for every 1000 males, and a literacy rate of 81.31%. 65.83% of the population lives in urban areas. Scheduled Castes made up 17.83% of the population.

Languages of Kanpur Nagar district (2011)
1. Hindi (92.4%)
2. Urdu (5.76%)
3. Punjabi (0.79%)
4. Others (1.02%)

At the time of the 2011 Census of India, 92.43% of the population in the district spoke Hindi (or a related language), 5.76% Urdu and 0.79% Punjabi as their first language. Awadhi (Kanpuriya) is the native dialect of the region.

Rank	Metropolitan Area	Area (km sq.)	Population (2011)	Coverage
1	Kanpur	450	2,768,057	Includes Kanpur Cantonment and Chakeri
2	Kanpur Cantonment	50	108,534	
3	Armapur Estate	20	15,463	
4	Northern Railway Colony	15	20,916	
5	Ghatampur	12	40,623	
6	Bilhaur	10	20,493	
7	Chakeri	5	7,526	
8	Bithoor	5	11,300	
9	Choubepur Kalan	5	10,785	
10	Shivrajpur	3	11,948	

== Villages ==
- Anei (village)
- Babhiyapur
- Chak Khaspur
- Garh
- Lakshmi Villa
- Sarh

== See also ==
- Bithoor
