= Irrigation tank =

Water reservoir

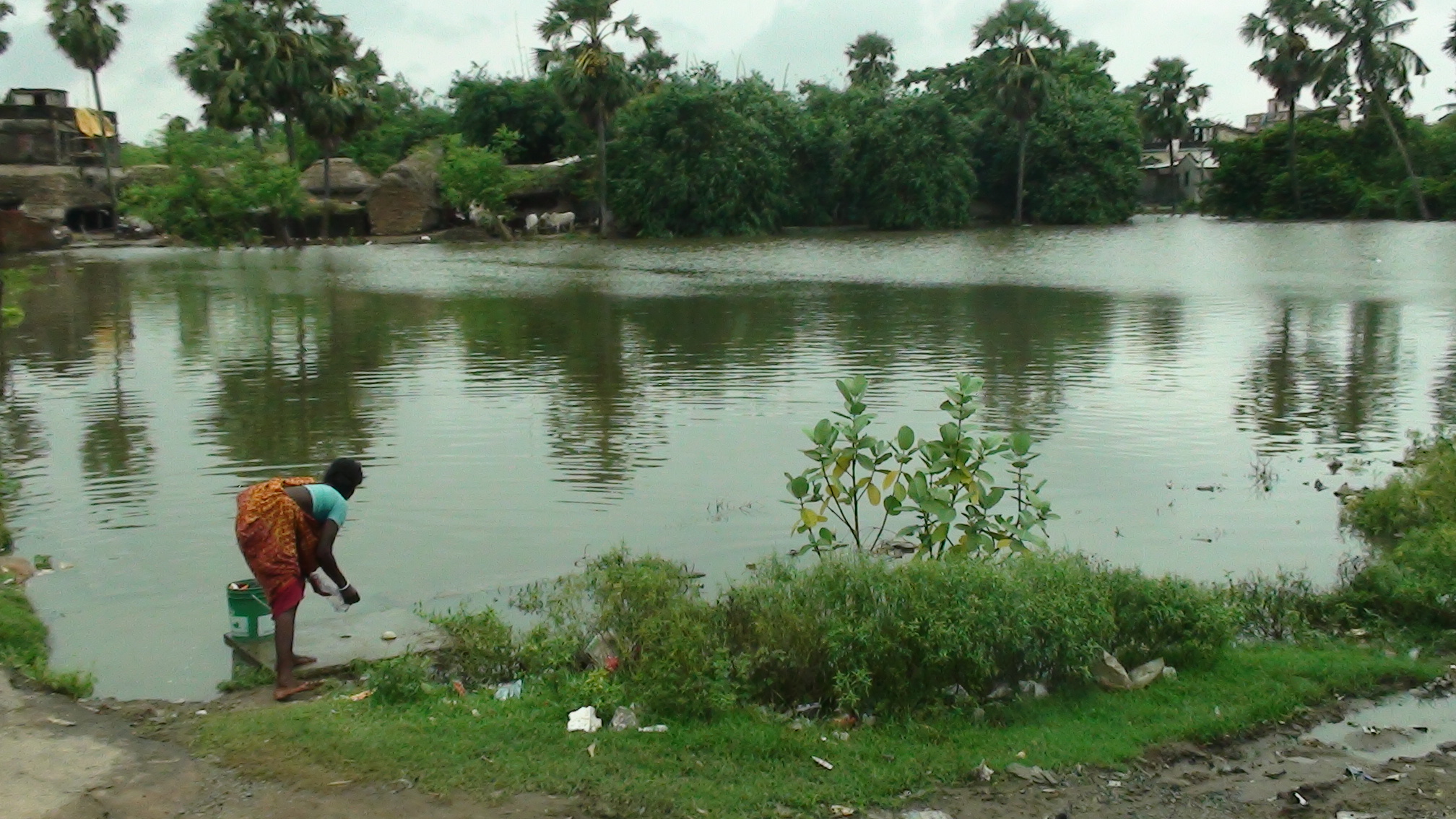
A tank in Tamil Nadu

An irrigation tank or tank is an artificial reservoir of any size. In countries like Sri Lanka and India they are part of historic methods of harvesting and preserving rainwater, critical in regions without perennial water resources. A tank is often an earthen bund (embankment or levee) constructed across a long slope to collect and store surface water from the above catchment and by taking advantage of local topography. The water would be used primarily for agriculture and drinking water, but also for bathing and rituals. The word tank is the English language substitute for several vernacular terms.

Tank irrigation, or reservoir irrigation, utilizes tanks and connected sluices and channels to direct water to the crops. This surface irrigation method can be used to grow crops like rice. Tank irrigation in Thailand is a newer method of irrigation as compared to peninsular India. Similar small-scale reservoir based irrigation methods using earthen bunds are used in countries like Ghana.

A tank cascade is a system of irrigation tanks in single or multiple chains where water from a higher tank flows into lower tanks. Examples of tank cascades include Sri Lanka's tank cascade system, the Indian city of Bangalore's cascading lakes in the Varthur lake series, and the Indian city of Madurai's Vandiyur tank cascade system.

== Structure and features ==
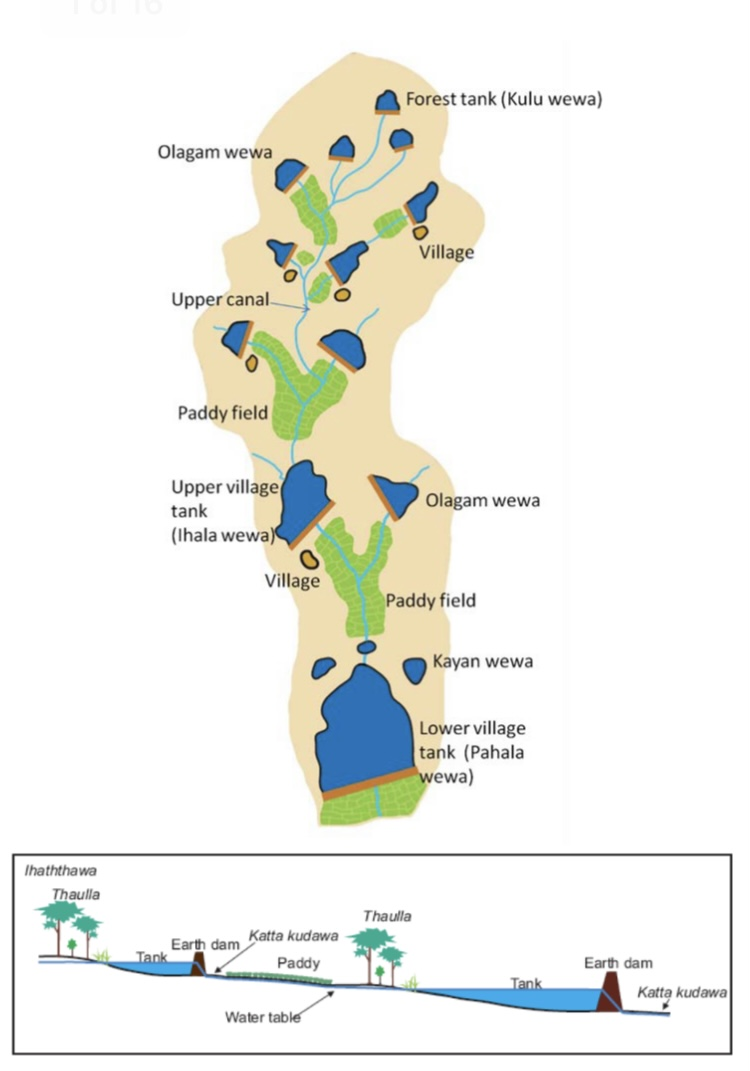
Tank cascade system diagram, aerial and elevation views, Sri Lanka

A tank consists of a shallow bed area near the inlet(s) and a relatively deeper bed area near the bund. The inlet is fed by an upstream catchment area and stream or canals. As part of an irrigation system, a number of sluices at the deeper bund area allows water to be fed into surface canals which distribute water to crops within the tank command area. A surplus/waste weir or the overflow outlet allows water to drain into a downstream tank.

The bund or embankment is an uneven bow or crescent-shaped structure. Depending on the landscape the length could vary widely from two to many kilometers. The bund is a few meters high. Irrigation tanks provide features that allow for other useful products such as fishes, grass, and silt.

== Modern tank management ==
In India there are approximately 120,000 small-scale tanks, irrigating about 41,200 km² in semi-arid areas of India. This constitutes about one third of the total irrigated land in South India. The development of large-scale water management methods and hydroelectric generation have replaced much of the local efforts and community management of water.

Ralegaon Siddhi is an example of a village that revitalised its ancient tank system. In 1975 the village was drought-stricken. The village tank could not hold water as the earthen embankment dam wall leaked. Work began with the percolation tank construction by the villagers to repair the embankment. Once this was fixed, the village's seven wells below the tank filled with water in the summer. Now the village has a supply of water throughout the year.

In 2006 Sri Lanka had over 11,000 tanks.

== Other types of tanks ==
Other types of tanks in the subcontinent include temple tanks and stepwells. Temple tanks are water storage tanks that combine the practical and sacred. Many temple tanks are decaying and drying up today. Since ancient times, the design of water storage has been important in Indian architecture. Stepwells were often used for leisure, providing relief from daytime heat. This led to the building of some significant ornamental and architectural features, often associated with dwellings and in urban areas. It also ensured their survival as monuments. An example of the art of tank design is the large, geometrically spectacular stepped tank at Vijayanagara, the capital of the Vijayanagara Empire, surrounding the modern town of Hampi.

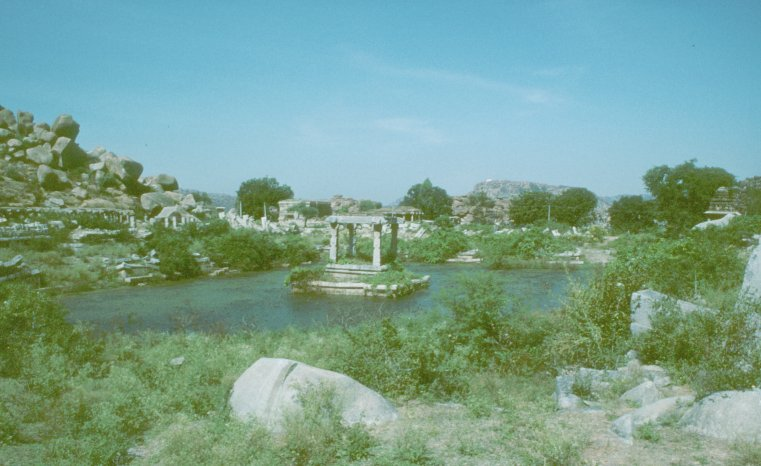
A shrine in a ruined tank at Vijayanagara in Karnataka

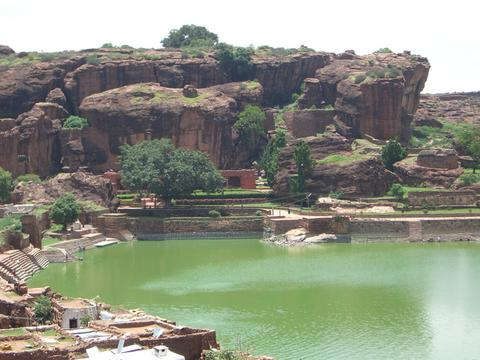
A tank at Badami in Karnataka

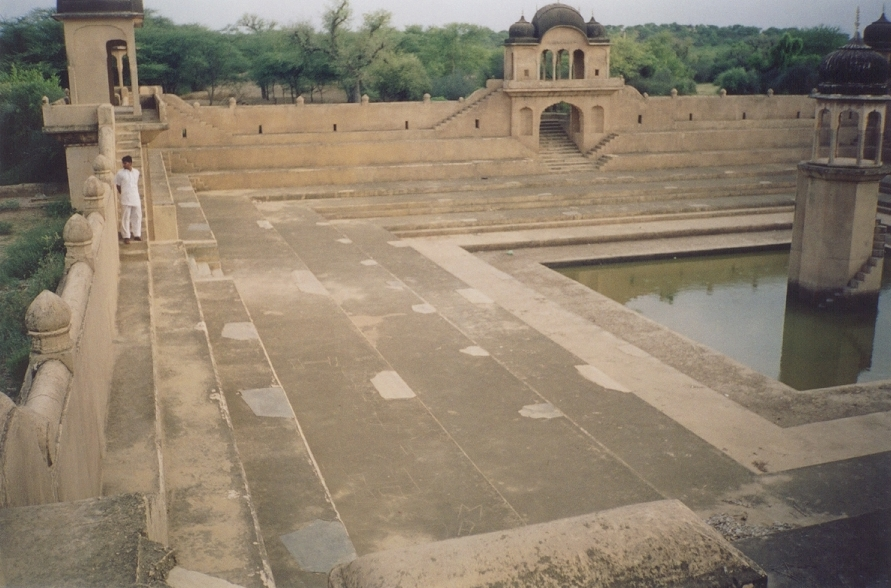
A bavdi at Shekhawati in Rajasthan

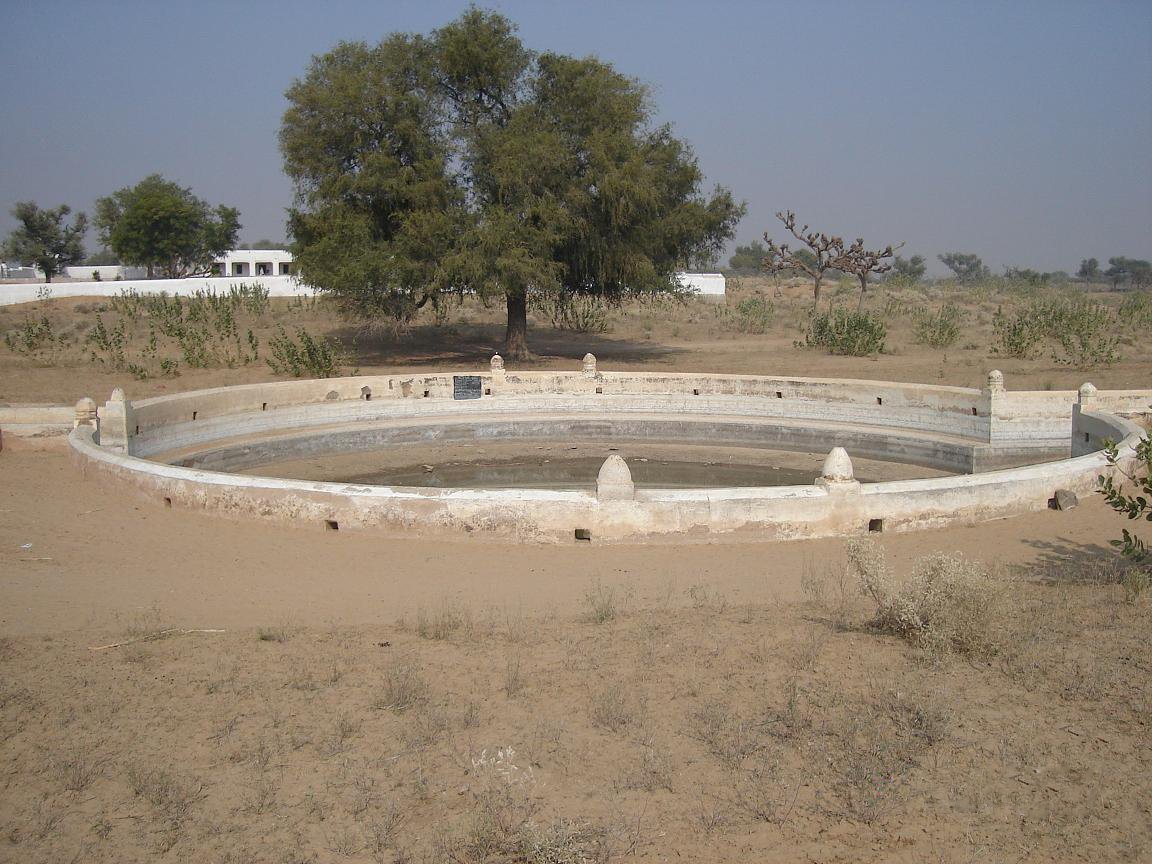
A johad at Thathawata in Rajasthan

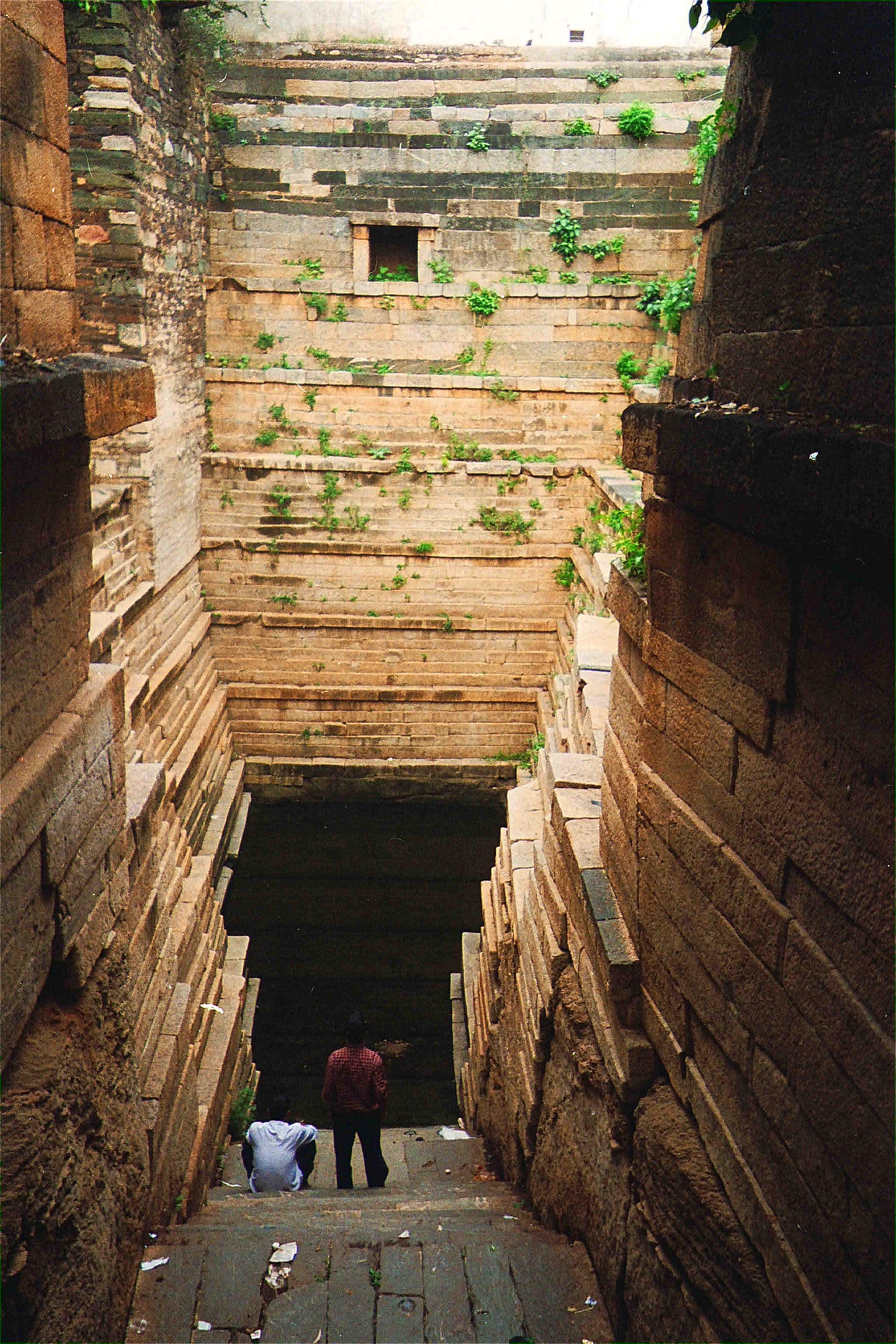
A well at Trikuteshwara temple in Karnataka

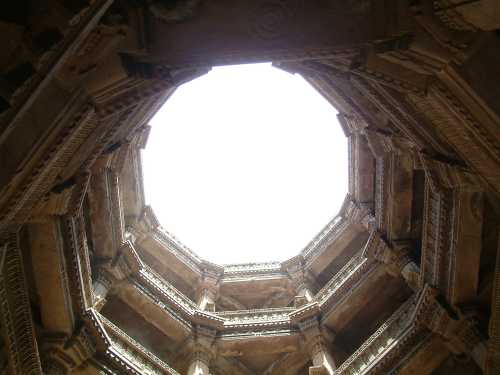
Adalaj Stepwell in Gujarat

== See also ==
- Permaculture
- Dam (agricultural reservoir)
