= Pilua =

Village in Uttar Pradesh, India

- Village
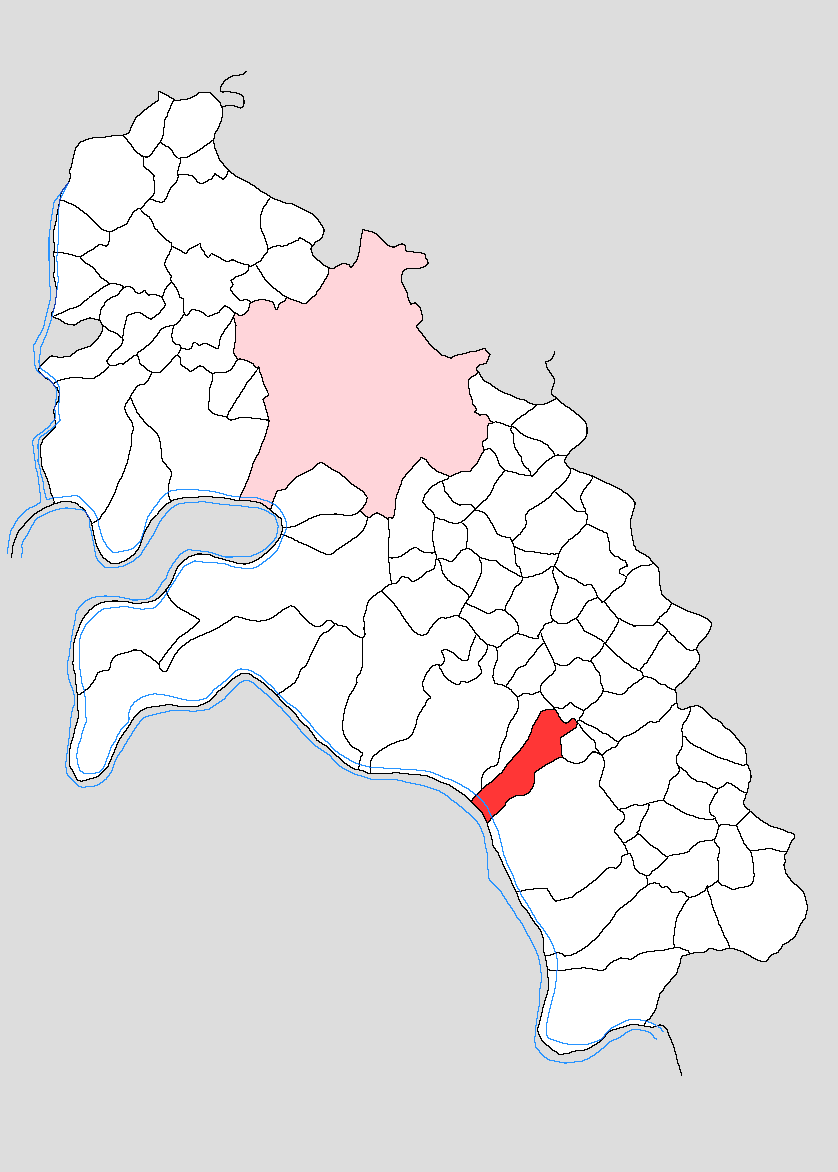
- Map showing Pilua in Firozabad block

- Location in Uttar Pradesh, India
- Coordinates: 27.06114°N 78.44663°E
- Country: India
- State: Uttar Pradesh
- District: Firozabad
- Tehsil: Firozabad

Area
  - Total: 3.049 km^{2} (1.177 sq mi)

Population (2011)
  - Total: 362
  - Density: 119/km^{2} (308/sq mi)
- Time zone: UTC+5:30 (IST)
- PIN: 283203

Pilua (Piluā) is a village in Firozabad block of Firozabad district, Uttar Pradesh. It is located southeast of Firozabad, with an area of rugged woodland separating it from the Yamuna river on the southwest. As of 2011, it had a population of 362, in 72 households.

== Geography ==
Pilua is located southeast of Firozabad and about 2 km northeast of the bank of the Yamuna. The area between Pilua and the Yamuna is broken up by many ravines, and much of it is covered by dense babul woodland belonging to the Firozabad Reserved Forest. In contrast to the steep ravines to the southwest, the area northeast of Pilua is all basically flat farmland. There is a large tank on the northwest side of the village. About 1 km to the northwest is the village of Pempur Anandipur, while about 1 km to the southeast are the hamlets of Muhammadpur and Shankarpur. About 1.5 km to the northeast are the close-together villages of Kindarpur and Satkai.

== Demographics ==
As of 2011, Pilua had a population of 362, in 72 households. This population was 57.7% male (209) and 42.3% female (153). The 0–6 age group numbered 36 (17 male and 19 female), making up 9.9% of the total population. 7 residents were members of Scheduled Castes, or 1.9% of the total.

The 1981 census recorded Pilua as having a population of 200 people (118 male and 82 female), in 28 households and 28 physical houses.

The 1961 census recorded Pilua as comprising 1 hamlet, with a total population of 250 people (130 male and 120 female), in 33 households and 25 physical houses. The area of the village was given as 758 acres.

== Infrastructure ==
As of 2011, Pilua had 1 primary school; it did not have any healthcare facilities. Drinking water was provided by hand pump and tube well/bore well; there were no public toilets. The village did not have a post office or public library; there was at least some access to electricity for residential and agricultural (but not commercial) purposes. Streets were made of both kachcha and pakka materials.
