= Rajendra Singh =

Indian environmentalist (born 1959)

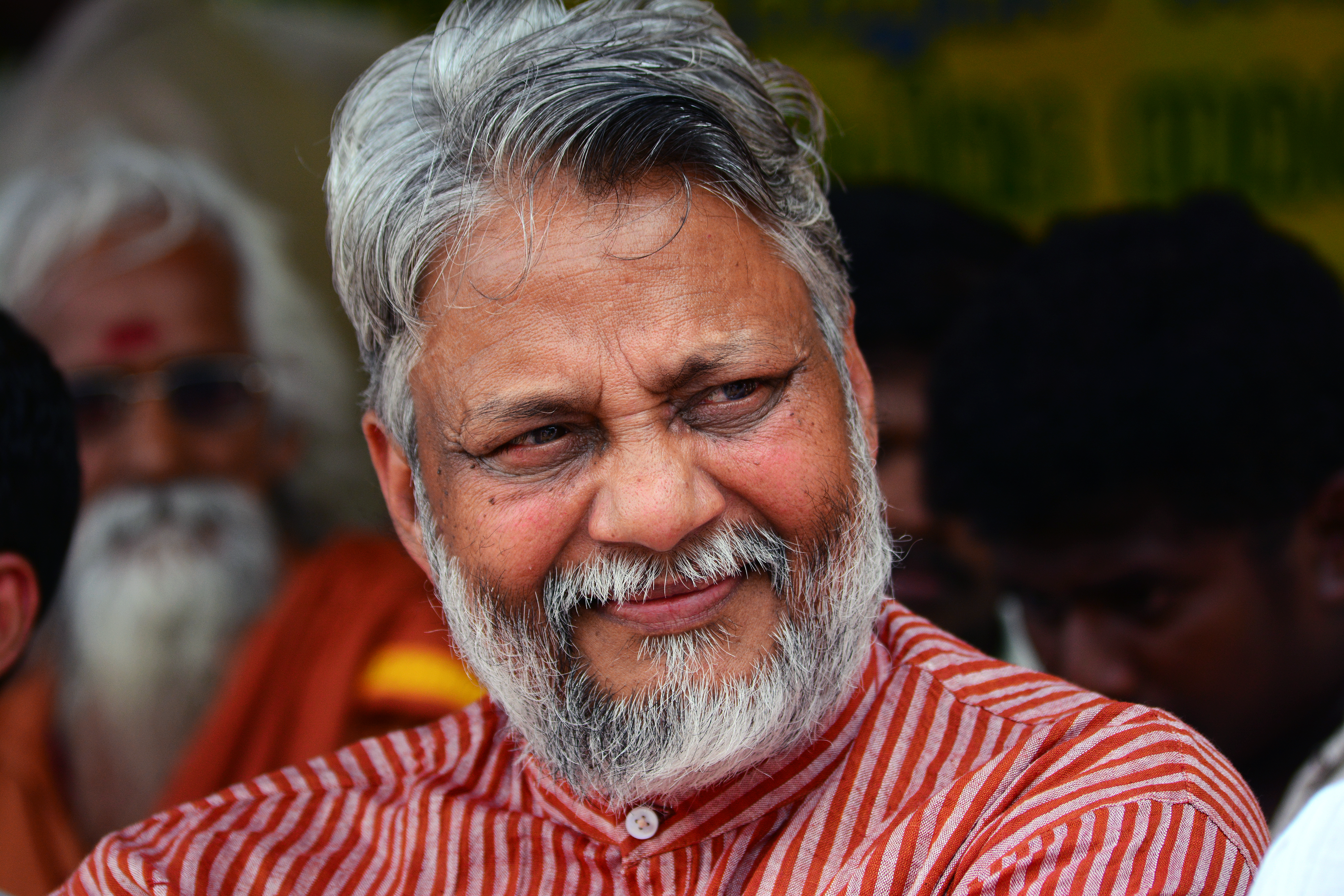
- Rajendra Singh at Palakkad in April 2017
- Born: 6 August 1959 (age 67); Daula, Uttar Pradesh, India
- Other name: "Waterman of India"
- Education: Allahabad University
- Occupation: water conservationist
- Organization: Tarun Bharat Sangh NGO
- Known for: Water-based conservation
- Website: tarunbharatsangh.in

Rajendra Singh (born 6 August 1959) is an Indian water conservationist and environmentalist from Alwar district, Rajasthan in India. Also known as the "Waterman of India", he won the Magsaysay Award in 2001 and Stockholm Water Prize in 2015. He runs an NGO called 'Tarun Bharat Sangh' (TBS), which was founded in 1975. The NGO based in village hori-Bhikampura in Thanagazi tehsil, near Sariska Tiger Reserve, has been instrumental in fighting the slow bureaucracy, mining lobby and has helped villagers take charge of water management in their semi-arid area as it lies close to Thar Desert, through the use of johad, rainwater storage tanks, check dams and other time-tested as well as path-breaking techniques.

Starting from a single village in 1985, over the years, TBS has helped build over 8,600 johads and other water conservation structures to collect rainwater for the dry seasons, has brought water back to over 1,000 villages, and revived five rivers in Rajasthan, Arvari, Ruparel, Sarsa, Bhagani and Jahajwali.

He is one of the members of the National Ganga River Basin Authority (NGRBA) which was set up in 2009, by the Government of India as an empowered planning, financing, monitoring and coordinating authority for the Ganges (Ganga), in exercise of the powers conferred under the Environment (Protection) Act, 1986.

== Early life ==
Rajendra Singh was born at village Daula in Bagpat district in Uttar Pradesh near Meerut. He was the eldest of seven siblings. His father was an agriculturist and looked over their 60 acres of land in the village and where Rajendra did his early schooling.

An important event in his life came in 1974, when he was still in high school, Ramesh Sharma, a member of Gandhi Peace Foundation visited their family home in Meerut, this opened up young Rajendra's mind, to issues of village improvement, as Sharma went about cleaning the village, opened a vachnalaya (library) and even got involved in settling local conflicts; soon he involved Rajendra in an alcoholism eradication program. Another important influence was an English language teacher in school, Pratap Singh, who started discussing politics and social issues with his students after class. At this time Emergency was imposed in 1975, making him aware about the issues of democracy and formulate independent views.

== Career ==
After completing his studies, he joined government service in 1980, and started his career as a National Service Volunteer for education in Jaipur, from where he was appointed to oversee adult education schools in Dausa district in Rajasthan. Meanwhile, he joined Tarun Bharat Sangha (Young India Association) or TBS, an organization formed by officer and students of Jaipur University to aid victims of a campus fire. Subsequently, after three years when he became General Secretary of the organisation, he questioned the organisation, which had been dabbling with various issues, for its inadequacy in having a substantial impact. Finally in 1984 the entire board resigned leaving the organization to him. One of the first tasks he took up was working with a group of nomad blacksmiths, who though traveled from village to village had little support from anyone. This exposure inspired him to work closely with people. However back at work, he was feeling increasingly frustrated by the apathy of his superiors towards developmental issues and his own inability to have a larger impact, he left his job in 1984. He sold all his household goods for Rs 23,000 and took a bus ticket for the last stop, on boarded bus going into interior of Rajasthan, along with him were four friends from Tarun Bharat Sangha. The last stop turned out to be Kishori village in Thanagazi tehsil in Alwar district, and the day was 2 October 1985. After initial skepticism, the villagers of neighboring village Bhikampura accepted him, and here they found a place to stay. Soon, he started a small Ayurvedic medicine practice in nearby village Gopalpura, while his colleagues went out about promoting education in the villages.

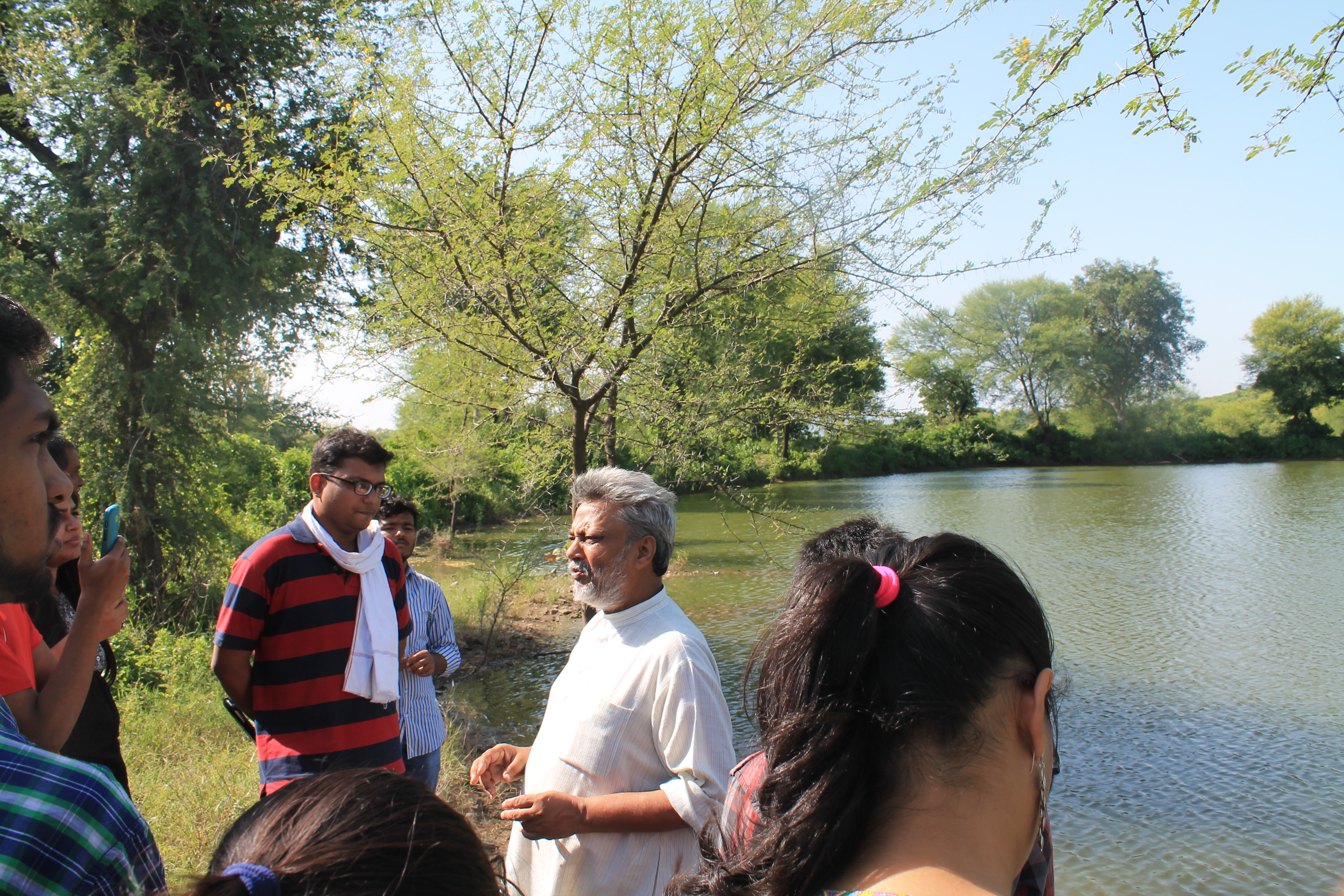
Rajendra Singh educating the students of Teri University, New Delhi about his projects at Alwar, Rajasthan.

Alwar district, which once had a grain market, was at the time largely dry and barren, as years of deforestation and mining had led to a dwindling water table, minimal rainfall followed by floods. Another reason was the slow abandoning of traditional water conservation techniques, like building check dams, or johad, instead villagers started relying on "modern" bore wells, which simply sucked the groundwater up. But consistent use meant that these bored wells had to be dug deeper and deeper within a few years, pushing underground water table further down each time, till they went dry in ecologically fragile Aravalis. At this point he met a village elder, Mangu Lal Meena, who argued "water was a bigger issue to address in rural Rajasthan than education". He chided him to work with his hands rather than behaving like "educated" city folks who came, studied and then went back; later encouraged him to work on a johad, earthen check dams, which have been traditionally used to store rainwater and recharge groundwater, a technique which had been abandoned in previous decades. As a result, the area had no ground water since previous five years and was officially declared a "dark zone". Though Rajendra wanted to learn the traditional techniques from local farmers about water conservation, his other city friends were reluctant to work manually and parted ways. Eventually with the help of a few local youths he started desilting the Gopalpura johad, lying neglected after years of disuse. When the monsoon arrived that year, the johad filled up and soon wells which had been dry for years had water. Villagers pitched in and in the next three years, it made it 15 feet deep.

Tarun Ashram in Kishori-Bhikampura in Thanagazi tehsil bordering the Sariska sanctuary, became the headquarters of Tarun Bharat Sangha. He started on his first padayatra (walkathon) through the villages of the area in 1986, educating to rebuild villages' old check dams. Yet their bigger success was yet to come, as inspired by the walkathon and success at Gopalpura, 20 km away, in 1986, people of Bhanota-Kolyala village with through shramdaan (voluntary labour) and with the help of TBS volunteers, constructed a johad at the source of a dried Arvari River, following this villages that lay in its catchment area, and along it also built tiny earthen dams, with largest being a 244-meter-long and 7-meter-high concrete dam in the Aravalli hills; eventually when the number of dams reached 375, the river started to flow again in 1990, after remaining dry for over 60 years. Yet the battle was far from over, even after constructing johads, the water level in the ponds and lakes around Sariska didn't go up as expected, that it went they discovered that missing water got evaporated from mining pits left unfilled by the miners after their operations in the area. A legal battle ensued, they filed public interest petition in the Supreme Court, which in 1991 banned mining in the Aravallis. Then in May 1992, Ministry of Environment and Forests notification banned mining in the Aravalli hill system all together, and 470 mines operating within the Sariska sanctuary buffer area and periphery were closed. Gradually TBS built 115 earthen and concrete structures within the sanctuary and 600 other structures in the buffer and peripheral zones. The efforts soon paid off, by 1995 Aravri became a perennial river. The river was awarded the `International River Prize', and in March 2000, then President, K. R. Narayanan visited the area to present the "Down to Earth — Joseph. C. John Award" to the villagers. In the coming years, rivers like Ruparel, Sarsa, Bhagani and Jahajwali were revived after remaining dry for decades. Abandoned villages in the areas got populated and farming activities could be resumed once again, in hundreds of drought-prone villages in neighbouring districts of Jaipur, Dausa, Sawai Madhopur, Bharatpur and Karauli, where work of TBS gradually spread.

By 2001, TBS had spread over an area of 6,500 km^{2}, also including parts of Madhya Pradesh, Gujarat and Andhra Pradesh. It had built 4,500 earthen check dams, or johads, to collect rainwater in 850 villages in 11 districts of Rajasthan, and he was awarded the Magsaysay Award for Community Leadership in the same year. Reforestation has been taken up by numerous village communities, and Gram sabha have been set up especially to look after community resources. A notable example is the Bhairondev Lok Vanyajeev Abhyaranya (people's sanctuary), spread over 12 km^{2} near Bhanota-Kolyala village at the head of Arvari. He has also been organizing Pani Pachayat or Water Parliament in distant villages in Rajasthan to make people aware of the traditional water conservation wisdom, the urgency of groundwater recharge for maintaining underground aquifers and advocating community control over natural resources. In 2005, he was awarded the Jamnalal Bajaj Award.

He also played a pivotal role in stopping the controversial Loharinag Pala Hydro Power Project over river Bhagirathi, the headstream of the Ganges River in 2006, even as G. D. Agrawal, environmentalist from IIT Kanpur went on a hunger strike.

In 2009, he led a pada yatra (walkathon), a march of a group of environmentalists and NGOs, through Mumbai city along the endangered Mithi River. On Jan 2014, he did a parikrama along the banks of Godavari River, from Trimbakeshwar to Paithan to urge people to make the river pollution free. Recently he gave lecture on water and its conservation and values of water at Atomic Energy Regulatory Board, Mumbai.

== Awards and honours ==
- In 2001, Ramon Magsaysay Award for community leadership in 2001 for his pioneering work in community-based efforts in water harvesting and water management.
- In 2005, Jamnalal Bajaj Award for Application of Science and Technology for Rural Development.
- In 2008, The Guardian named him amongst its list of "50 people who could save the planet".
- In 2015, he won the Stockholm Water Prize, an award known as "the Nobel Prize for water".
