= Dam (agricultural reservoir) =

Water reservoir on a pastoral property

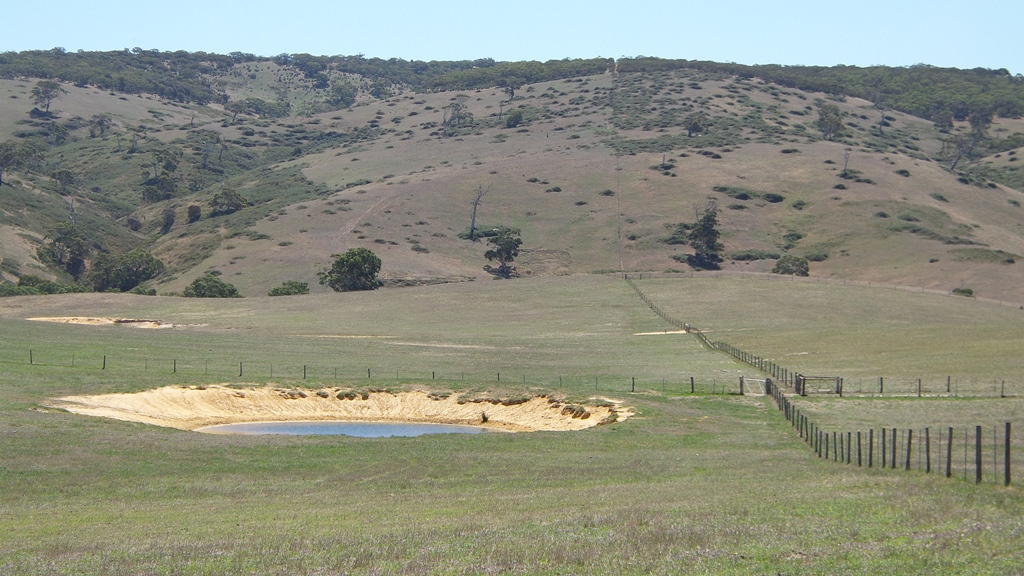
Farm dam in the Adelaide Hills near Strathalbyn

A dam is a water reservoir in the ground, confined by a barrier, embankment or excavation, on a pastoral property or similar. The term is found widely in South African, Australian and New Zealand English, and several other English dialects, such as that of Yorkshire.

The term can be found in the old English folk song Three Jolly Rogues:

The miller was drowned in his dam,
The weaver was hung by his yarn

The expression "farm dam" has this meaning unambiguously, and where the barrier or embankment is intended, it may be referred to as the "dam wall".

== Usage examples ==
Examples from Australia:

On Wednesday, the 3rd inst., an inquest was held at the house of Mr. H. Lamshed, J.P. near Maitland, on the body of William Lamshed, who was drowned in his father's dam on that morning.

— Yorke's Peninsula Advertiser And Miners' And Farmers' Journal (1878)

The machinery is now idle, owing to the water in the dam having dried up, but everything is in readiness for a start as soon as the rain sets in.

— Adelaide Observer (1870)

Will anything be done to dredge out silt from Stephens Creek and so increase its capacity? — Definitely no. Such an operation is never worth-while. It is always cheaper to dig a new dam.

— Barrier Miner (1943)

An example from New Zealand:

A farmer, Wilfred Wylam Emslie, aged 60, was drowned on Saturday in a dam on a farm at Ōakura, while attempting to rescue sheep. Resuscitation attempts failed.

— Auckland Star (1931)

Examples from South Africa:

Every Karroo house has a dam near it, and on a large farm there are generally three or four more of these reservoirs in different parts of the land.

— Home life on an ostrich farm (1890)

In the distance we could see the glimmering blue waters of a huge dam.

— Lady Sarah Wilson, South African memories (1909)

Water? We’ve a dam full to spare... The dam, situated between beautiful rolling hills, has numerous picnic sites around it and the dam itself is stocked with black bass and bluegill.

— Daily Dispatch (1925)

== See also ==
- Irrigation tank
- dam
