= Jahajwali River =

River in Rajasthan

Jahajwali River is one of the smallest rivers in the Aravalli hills of Rajasthan. It originates in Umri Deori, Guwada in Rajgarh Tahsil of Alwar district in Rajesthan state, India. It covers total geographic area of 89 km^{2}.

The river flows a distance of 20 km via ridge to valley. This river outflows through India lifelines of Tildah river, Sava river than it joins to Bhanganga and Gambir river, than meet Yamuna river and all these rivers finally meet at Ganga river. It flows from east to west slopes in Guwada, Bhakala and Umri Deori villages than it moves direction towards south west and outflows in Tildah Dam. Jahajwali river comes under Sariskha Tiger Reserve and 3 villages (Guwada, Bhakala and Devari) comes in core zone area. River is covered a unique streams. 1st order streams 15 nos, 2nd streams 2 nos and only 1, 3rd streams. In 1985 river was dried due to deforestation and water scarcity. To rejuvenate the Jahajwali river Tarun Bharath Singh (TBS) initiated soil and water conservation activities with community participation in the catchment areas and finally 126 no's water harvesting structures created to revival the Jahajwali river. Adjoining rivers to Jahajwali river right side and west direction Bhagani river flows and south side Tildah River these both rivers joint in Sava river. In this river basin annual rainfall 620 mm and 90% of the rains in the monsoon season.
