= Satkai =

Village in Uttar Pradesh, India

- Village
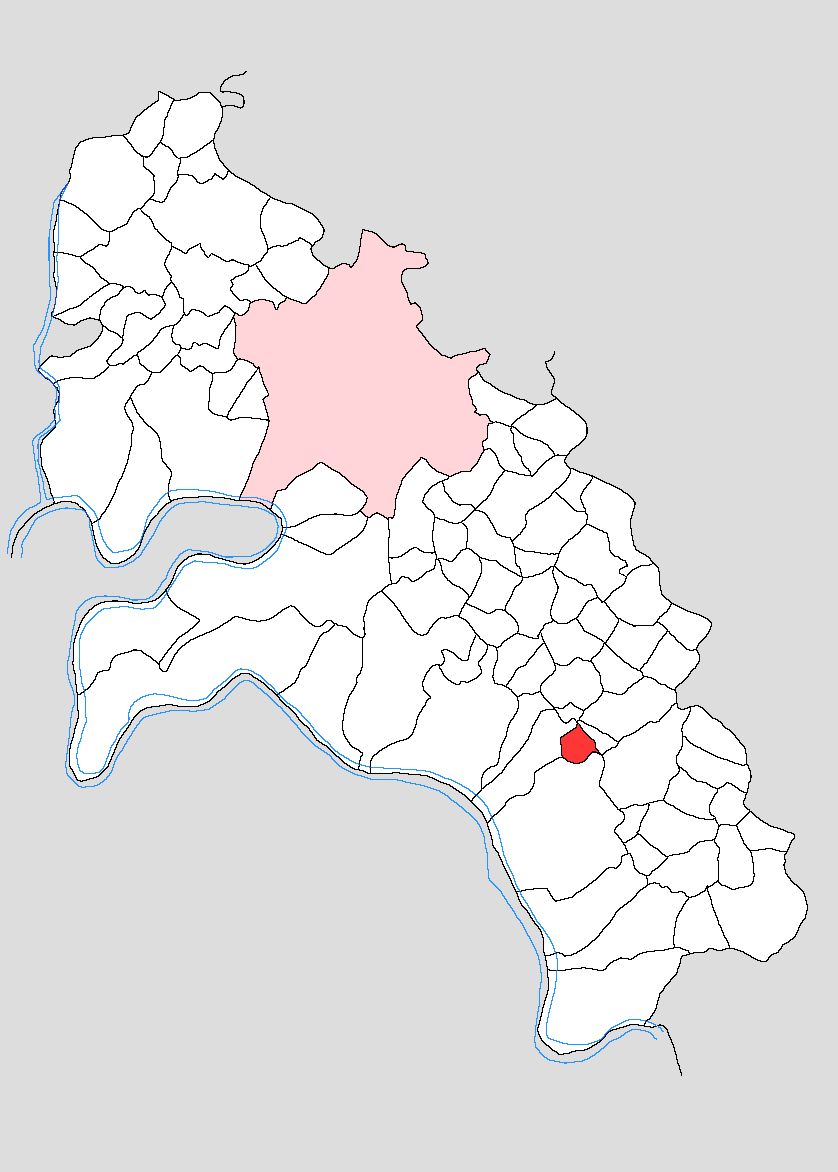
- Map showing Satkai in Firozabad block

- Location in Uttar Pradesh, India
- Coordinates: 27.06597°N 78.45619°E
- Country: India
- State: Uttar Pradesh
- District: Firozabad
- Tehsil: Firozabad

Area
  - Total: 0.773 km^{2} (0.298 sq mi)

Population (2011)
  - Total: 250
  - Density: 320/km^{2} (840/sq mi)
- Time zone: UTC+5:30 (IST)
- PIN: 283203

Satkai (Satkaī) is a village in Firozabad block of Firozabad district, Uttar Pradesh. It is located southeast of Firozabad. As of 2011, it had a population of 250, in 41 households.

== Geography ==
Satkai is located southeast of Firozabad and is surrounded by level farmland. The village of Kindarpur is located very close to the northwest; farther off to the west is Pempur Anandipur, and to the southwest is Piluwa. To the northeast is the village of Matsena, and to the southeast is Wazirpur Anandipur.

== Demographics ==
As of 2011, Satkai had a population of 250, in 41 households. This population was 58.4% male (146) and 41.6% female (104). The 0–6 age group numbered 48 (23 male and 25 female), making up 19.2% of the total population. 97 residents were members of Scheduled Castes, or 38.8% of the total.

The 1981 census recorded Satkai as having a population of 174 people (94 male and 80 female), in 25 households and 25 physical houses.

The 1961 census recorded Satkai as comprising 1 hamlet, with a total population of 109 people (61 male and 48 female), in 12 households and 8 physical houses. The area of the village was given as 191 acres.

== Infrastructure ==
As of 2011, Satkai did not have any schools or healthcare facilities. Drinking water was provided by hand pump and tube well/bore well; there were no public toilets. The village did not have a post office or public library; there was at least some access to electricity for residential and agricultural (but not commercial) purposes. Streets were made of both kachcha and pakka materials.
