= Thathawata =

- village
- View of sand dunes at village Thathawata

- Location in Rajasthan, India Thathawata (India)
- Coordinates: 28.08°N 74.77°E
- Country: India
- State: Rajasthan
- District: Churu
- Founder: Hari Singh Bidawat
- Elevation: 313 m (1,027 ft)

Population (2001)
  - Total: 2,500

Languages
  - Official: Hindi
- Time zone: UTC+5:30 (IST)
- PIN: 331022
- Telephone code: 01567

Thathawata is a village located in Churu District of Rajasthan state in India. At the 2001 census, the village had a total population of 2500.

The Village Thathawata is within the Ratangarh Tehsil in the southeast direction, west of Fatehpur and 3 km southwest of Biramsar village on National Highway.

== History ==
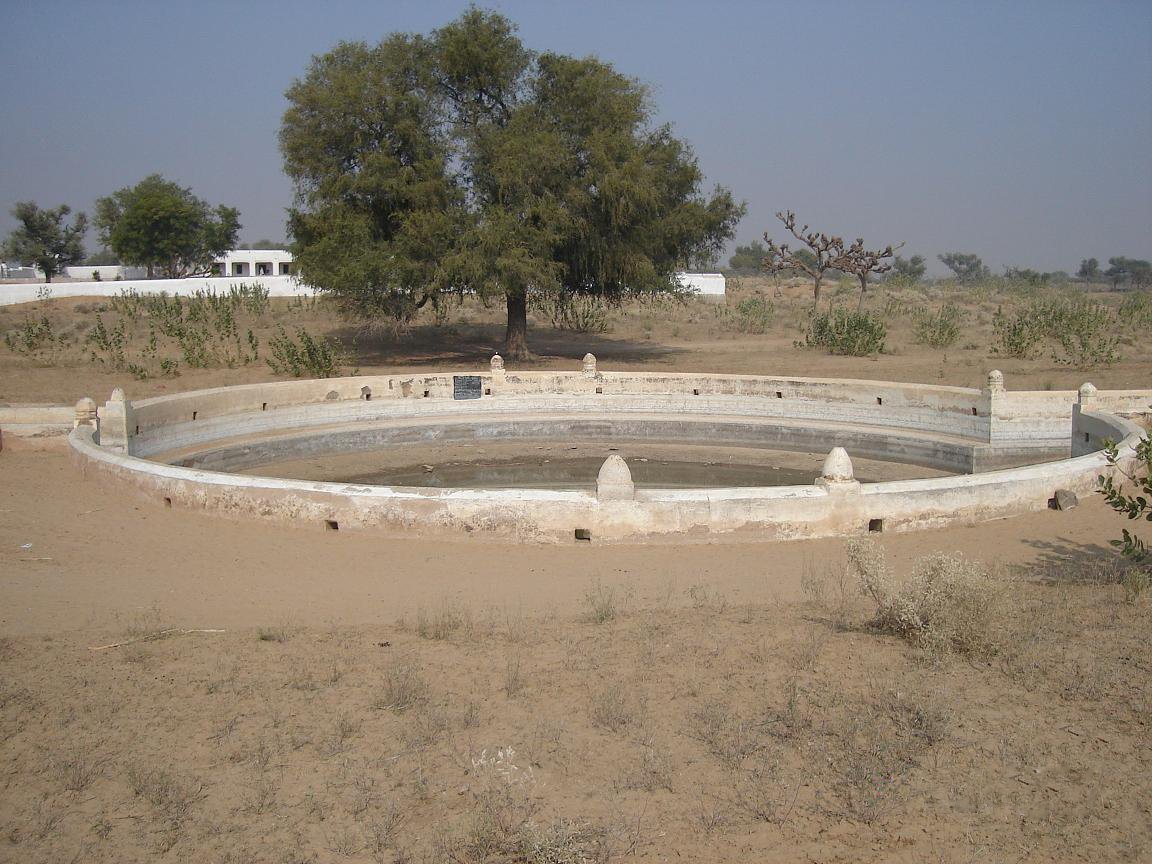
View of a Johad at village Thathawata

After the victory of last Hindu King of Delhi, Prithviraj III Chauhan, in the Second Battle of Tarain in 1192, The Rajput Rathore in his army moved to the countryside and settled as cultivators at various places in India. One such Rathore soldier was Hari singh of Bhadia clan who founded the village Thathawata. The Bhadias had also settled villages Banthod and Rol in present Sikar district of Rajasthan.

== Geography ==
Route Biramsar on National Highway-11 to Kusumdesar village passes through the village.

The natural climatic conditions in the village are very harsh and extreme. The temperature ranges from sub-zero in winters to more than 50 °C in summers. The summers bring hot waves of air called "loo". The village lies in the Thar Desert region. Annual rainfall is very low of the scale of 25 cm. The ground water in the village is hard and salty and as deep as 200 feet. The people in the region depend on rainwater harvesting. The rainwater is stored in pucca tanks, known as Johad, which is used throughout the year for drinking purposes. On an average the region faces every third year as a dry year and every eighth year as a famine year. During famine years it becomes very difficult for the animals to survive for want of fodder and the cattle population goes down drastically.

== Demographics ==
At the census of 2001, Thathawate had a population of 6,500, of which 1105 were adults. There were 650 families residing in the village. Out of these, 513 families are of Bidawat (Rathore) Rajputs, 66 families of Jats and 75 families of other castes. The Jat families included Burdak, Chahar, Jhajharia, Pachar and Punia clans. The other castes included Brahmans, Harijans, Kumhars, Nai, Dholi, Naik and Daroga.

The main occupation of the villagers was in agriculture. There were around 30 persons serving the Indian Army and the same number of retired army personnel. About 70 people had gone to Arab countries for work. There were 7 teachers, one advocate and one All India Services class one officer.

All people belong to Hindu religion. There is one temple of Thakurji (Banke Bhihari ji), One tample of Shree Balaji two temples of Goddess Mawali and one than (a sacred place) of Gogaji.
