= Taanka =

Rainwater harvesting technique

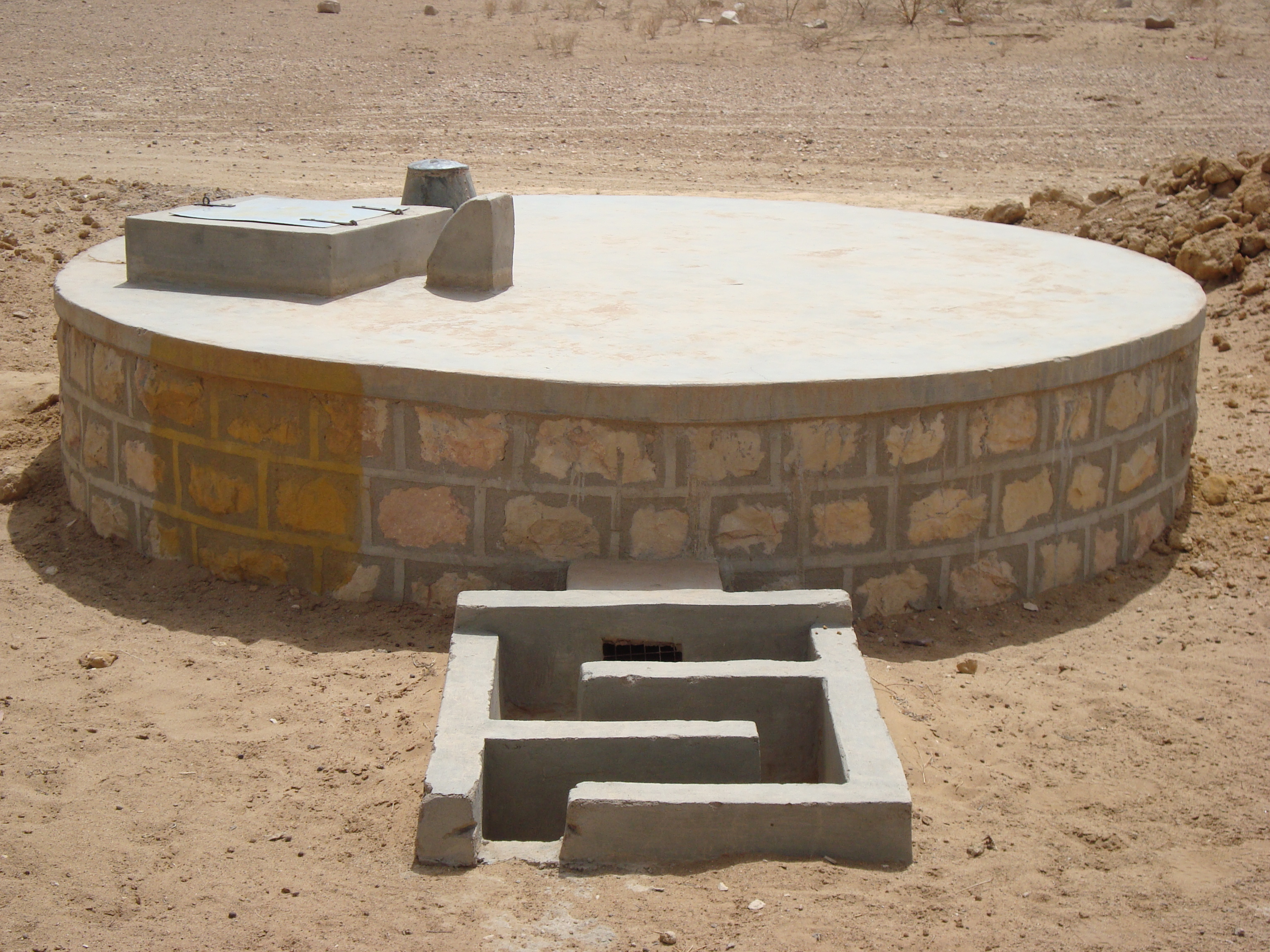
A Taanka

A taanka or paar, is a traditional rainwater harvesting technique, common to the Thar Desert region of Rajasthan, India. It is meant to provide drinking water and water security for a family or a small group of families. A taanka is composed of a covered, underground, impermeable cistern on shallow ground for the collection of rainwater. The cistern is generally constructed out of stone or brick masonry, or concrete, with lime mortar or cement plaster. Rainwater or surface run-off from rooftops, courtyards, or artificially prepared catchments (locally called agor) flow into the tank through filtered inlets in the wall of the pit.

The water stored saves people from the daily task of walking long distances to fetch water from sources which are often contaminated. The water in a taanka is usually only used for drinking. If any year there was less than normal rainfall and household tanka do not get filled, water would instead be obtained from nearby wells and tanks to fill the tanks.

== History ==
Taankas were usually constructed near religious centers and in villages for community usage due to the belief in the sanctity of water. This preservation technique is an ancient practice dating back to at least 1607 A.D. near Jodhpur.

However, people now generally prefer to construct taankas locally in each hamlet and are owned and maintained by individual families. This shift is mainly due to dominant groups monopolizing or taking disproportionate shares of communal water, marginalizing the needs of poor and lower caste. Generally, community structures now fail through underinvestment leading to poor workmanship and aftercare.

The technique was largely abandoned in the later 20th century as pipes lines or hand pumps were laid to transport water from Perennial Rajasthan Canal to their houses, though some houses still maintain the taankas since they do not like the taste of tap water. When the region was faced with drought-like situations, inadequate supplies of piped water on the account of growing population, and depleted or contaminated ground water, this traditional method was revived, along with other traditional rainwater harvesting structures like, Naadi, a village pond and Beri, a small rainwater-collecting wells, especially for supplying drinking water.

Though originally found in the desert towns, the system has since gained immense popularity in rural areas. In Phalodi, Barmer and Balotra region, rural taankas were found that were 6.1 meters (20 ft) deep, 4.27 meters (14 ft) long and 2.44 meters (8 ft) wide. This technique of harvesting rainwater was perfected to a fine art in the arid regions of western Rajasthan. Such water harvesting structures have also been reported being built in other arid developing countries such as Botswana, Ghana, Kenya, Yemen, Sri Lanka, Thailand, and Indonesia.

Bikaner was founded by Rao Bika in 1488 AD. The choice of Bikaner as an urban center seems to have been strongly influenced by the availability of tracts of mudiya kanker, also known as murrum (मूरड़), a particular set of gravel and dirt which compacts easily when mixed with water and possesses excellent run off characteristics. This facilitated rainwater harvesting through an elaborate network of taankas.

== Construction ==
Traditional family-managed taankas are constructed by digging a hole of 3 to 4.25 meter diameter in the ground and plastering it with lime mortar cement about 6 mm thick, followed by a cement plaster of about 3 mm thickness. Most modern taankas have a capacity of around 21,000 liters but larger ones can be constructed where resources are available.

Commonly, the catchment area, known as an agor, is a concave cemented funnel-like slope directing water into a collection pit that reduces the sediment load of water before it enters the underground cistern via a suitable mesh supported by bars in an angle iron frame to filter out other large debris. The micro-catchment avoids seepage and prevents erosion, and is fenced to restrict animal entry. The bottom of the cistern is also concave facilitating extraction of the maximum amount of water from the taanka. The cistern has a top cover to prevent evaporation and pollution of stored water by foreign matter. A galvanised iron cover is built into the cover to facilitate withdrawal of water. Taanka covers are ventilated, helping to prevent bad odor in the stored water. Outlets are provided to allow excess water falling during the monsoon to escape.

Taankas are often beautifully decorated with tiles, which also keep the water cool.

== Usage and maintenance ==
Taanka require cleaning at least once a year, typically before the onset of the monsoon. This includes desilting the taanka cistern, sweeping the micro-catchment, and painting inlets and the outlet to keep the system in good working condition. Periodic dosing with oxidizing agents, such as potassium permanganate, helps prevent the growth of microscopic organisms and the consequent development of bad taste, odor and color in the water. Alum additions also help to settle suspended matter. At least a few centimetres of water should always be maintained in the taanka to ensure that the cistern walls remain moist, avoiding the development of cracks and other physical defects. If well maintained, a taanka has a service life of at least 30 years.

== Usage in present day ==
In towns around Bikaner, there was an abundance of tanks. The most important ones being at Kolayat with a catchment area of 14,900 ha (37,000 acres), Gajner 12,950 ha (32,000 acres), and Ganga sarovar with 7,950 hectares (19,600 acres). The water needs of the town were met by the innumerable tanks in and around Bikaner, together with the wells and taankas that each house traditionally built for harvesting rainwater from the roof tops. The water from the taankas was used only for drinking purposes. If in any year there was less than normal rainfall and the taankas did not get filled, water from proximal wells and tanks would be obtained to fill the household taankas. In this way, the people of Bikaner were able to meet their water requirements.

== See also ==
- Ancient water supply and sanitation
  - History of water supply and sanitation
  - Ancient water conservation in India
  - History of stepwells in Gujarat
  - Sanitation in ancient Rome
  - Important water resource topics of India
- Arid
  - Arid Forest Research Institute (AFRI)
  - Central Arid Zone Research Institute
