= Johad =

Traditional rainwater-storage wetland in India

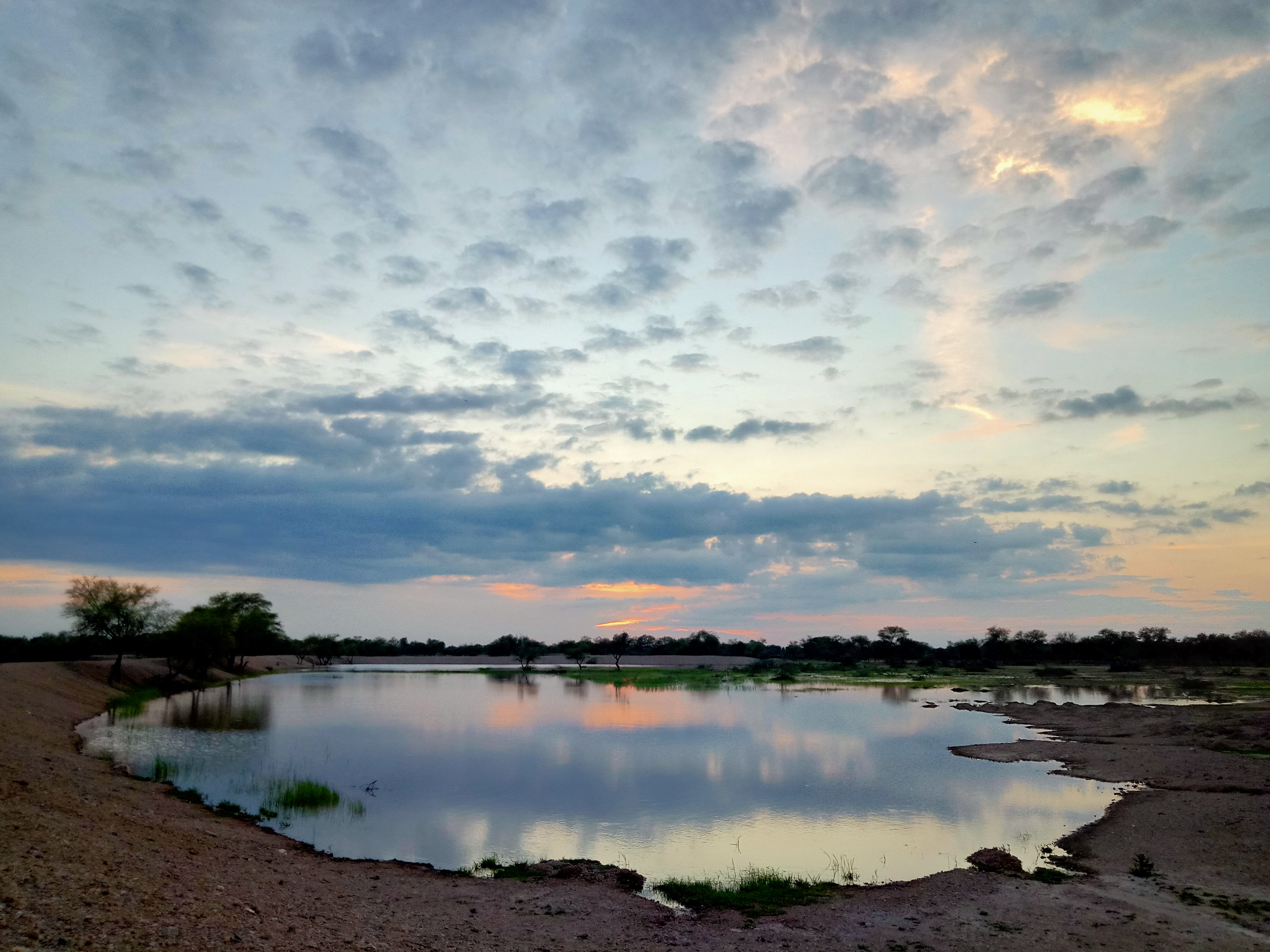
Nadi (small johad) in Laporiya village of Rajasthan

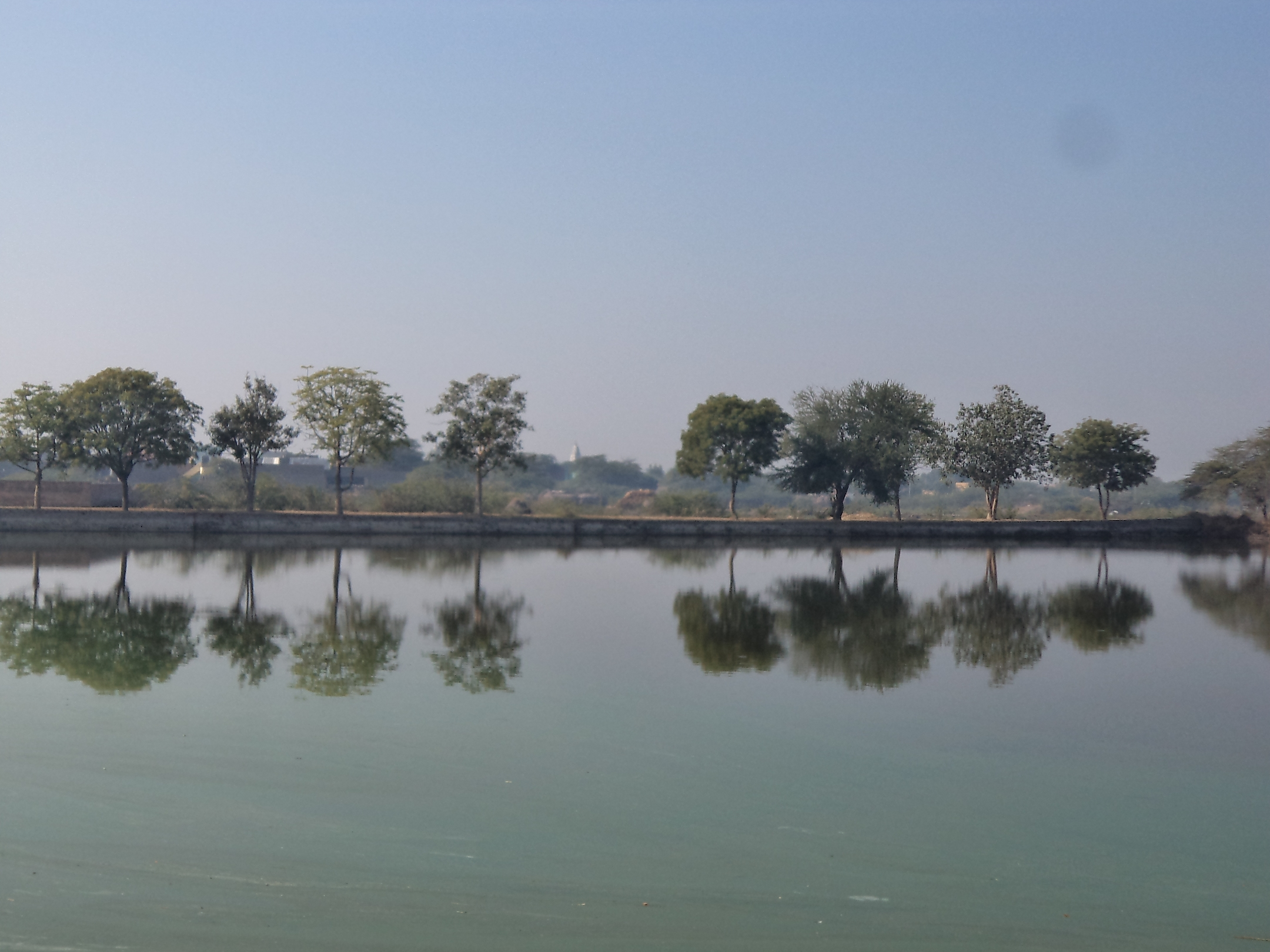
Johad at Rithal village of Rohtak district of Haryana

A johad, also known as a pokhar or a percolation pond, is a community-owned traditional harvested rainwater storage wetland principally used for effectively harnessing water resources in the states of Haryana, Rajasthan, Punjab, Delhi and western Uttar Pradesh of North India, that collects and stores water throughout the year, to be used for the purpose of recharging the groundwater in the nearby water wells, washing, bathing and drinking by humans and cattle. Some johads also have bricked or stones masonry and cemented ghat (series of steps and/or ramp).

Rainwater fills the pit. These are connected to other small pits like this. The extra rainwater fills in the smaller pits. They are then used for cleaning, drinking and washing purposes.

Johads also cater to resident and seasonal migrant birds as well as wildlife animals from the nearby forest. State fisheries departments also promote the use of these johads for raising fishes on contract basis for commercial fishing. Johads are often seen surrounded by embankment, with water wells and trees around them. In many parts, especially in the dry state of Rajasthan, the annual rainfall is very low (between 450 and 600 mm) and the water can be unpleasant to drink. Rainfall during July and August is stored in johads and used throughout the year. Johad in Haryanvi language and Rajasthani language are also called sarovar, taal and talab in Hindi language, and water pond or lake in English. A similar structure to a johads, called a khadin, consists of a very low and long earthen bund in the Jaisalmer district. Over 4,500 working johads in Alwar district and surrounding districts Rajasthan were revived by the NGO Tarun Bharat Sangh by Rajendra Singh. Haryana formed the Haryana State Waterbody Management Board to rejuvenate and manage 14,000 ponds in the state, including the development of 60 lakes in Delhi NCR falling within the state.

Smaller cemented water tanks called taankas in parts of Rajasthan are also sometimes mistakenly referred to as johads. Concretized rain-fed taanka and canal-fed diggi are different from the johads.

== Religious significance ==
Matsya Purana, a Hindu text, has a Sanskrit shloka (hymn), which explains the importance of reverence of ecology in Hinduism. It states, "A pond equals ten wells, a reservoir equals ten ponds, while a son equals ten reservoirs, and a tree equals ten sons."

Gramadevata (village deity) temples and Jathera shrines of pitrs for ancestral worship are usually found on the banks of johads, which also have ghats for the sacred rituals, bathing, and other religious, social, and practical human activities.

== Johad wetlands ==
=== Type of construction ===
Johads can be of several types, such as dug-out in areas to which rainwater can be easily channeled. Alternatively, simple mud-and-rubble-barrier check dams may be built across the contour of a slope with a high embankment on three sides, while the fourth side is left open for the rainwater to enter. These catch and conserve rainwater, leading to improved percolation and groundwater recharge. They are very common in most villages of states of Haryana, Rajasthan, Uttar Pradesh, and the Thar Desert of Rajasthan in India.

=== Rejuvenation ===
2019 Atal Bhujal Yojana (Atal groundwater scheme), a five-year (2020–25) scheme costing INR 6 billion (US$85 million) for managing demand with village panchayat-level water security plans entailing johad rejuvenation (wetland) and groundwater recharge, was approved for implementation in 8,350 water-stressed villages across 7 states, including Haryana, Rajasthan, Gujarat, Madhya Pradesh, Uttar Pradesh, Karnataka, and Maharashtra.

==== Haryana Johads rejuvenation ====
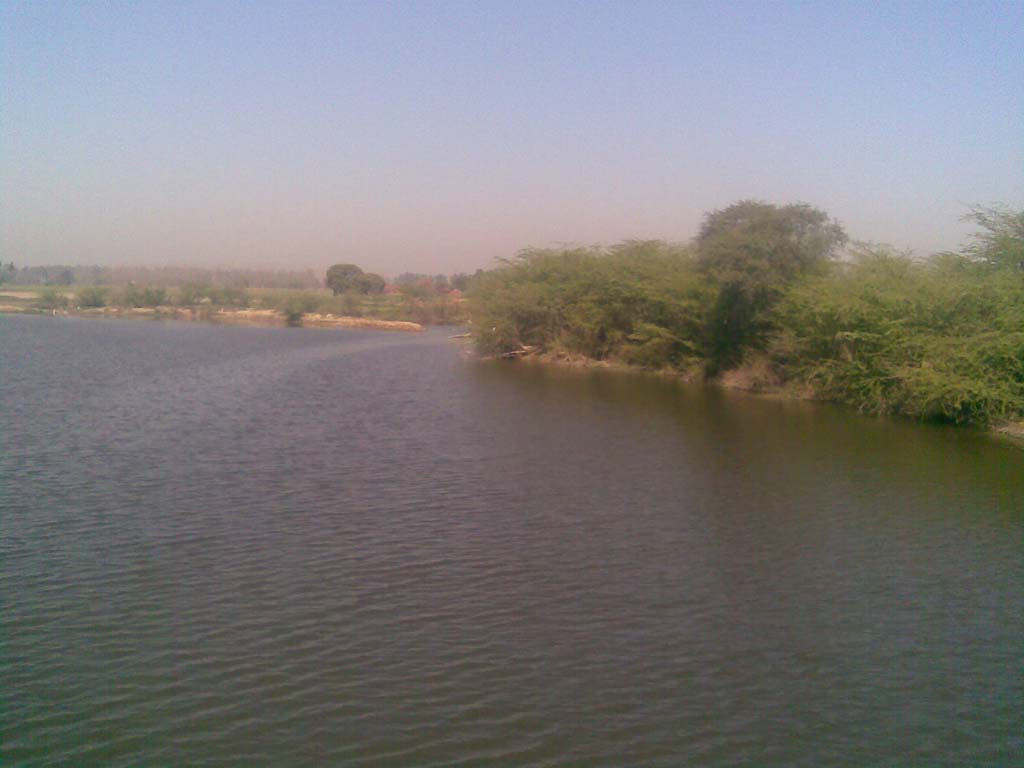
Johad at Rithal village of Rohtak district of Haryana

In 2007, Haryana Irrigation Department spent INR435.26 crore (INR4.3 billion or US$7 million) to renovate and restore water bodies in the state for the conservation of water, recharging of ground water, preservation of environment, and enhancement of tourism. A study by the Panjab University found 60 fish species of 19 families, 11 commercial and 6 exotic species, in the water bodies of Haryana. Water bodies remain under risk from encroachment, shrinking of catchment area, and pollution. In 2010, India's first-ever diatom databasing was done in ten different water bodies at ten different stations in Haryana. A 2015 study of 24 water bodies of Haryana found 39 morphologically different types of diatoms.

In 2016, the Government of Haryana announced a plan to map the district-wise map of water flow and to create a database of all water bodies within the state. These water bodies have contributed to the economic development through fisheries in the landlocked state of Haryana. Haryana ranks second in India in terms of the average annual fish production per unit area in the country, with 7000 kg per hectare. Fish production has increased from 600 tonnes in 1966-67 at the time of formation of Haryana to 121000 t of fish during the year 2015–16, providing a livelihood to over 30000 families in the fisheries sector.

On 1 November 2017, Chief Minister of Haryana Manohar Lal Khattar announced that the Government of Haryana will form the Haryana State Waterbody Management Board to rejuvenate and manage 14,000 ponds in Haryana by digging the silt out every year. This includes the development of 50 to 60 lakes in the National Capital Region falling within the Haryana state.

As of 2020, the Government of Haryana is reviving various johads of Gurugram. In June 2020, for the revival of ponds at Gwal Pahari, estimates were being prepared to undertake the erection of a boundary wall, building a walking track around the johad, clearing bushes, planting trees, and to connect the seasonal rivulet to the johad to ensure that it retains water year around.

In 2021, Haryana will undertake a survey based on 1957 revenue records and satellite surveys to identify the ponds, remove encroachments, and in the first phase will rejuvenate 1868 ponds by the end of 2022 to use water from the ponds to irrigate 50 acres per pond, for a total of 93400 acres.

==== Rajasthan Johads rejuvenation ====
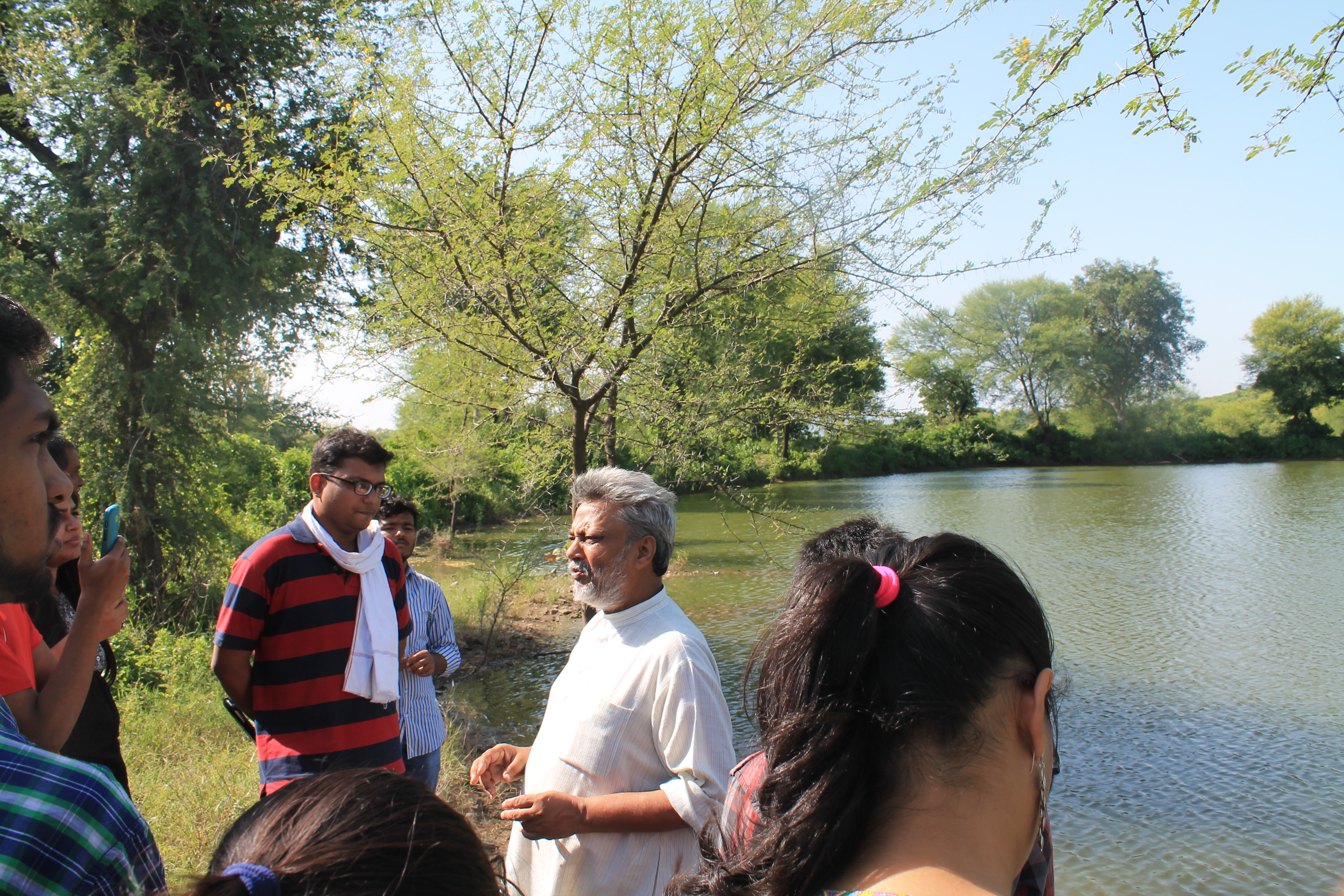
Rajendra Singh, founder of Tarun Bharat Sangh NGO explaining the use of johad to the students of TERI University in Alwar district of Rajasthan

There was a severe drought in Alwar district in Rajasthan during 1985–86. In 1985, volunteers from the Tarun Bharat Sangh (TBS), a voluntary organization led by Rajendra Singh, came to Alwar. The Alwar District had once thrived, but logging, mining, and other industrial activities resulted in land degradation that intensified flooding and droughts. The traditional water-management system using johads was abandoned. TBS revived the tradition of building johads, an example of traditional technology that provided water for use and recharging ground water. Now, smaller, cemented johads are popularly known as tankas in most parts of Rajasthan.

== Similar water bodies ==
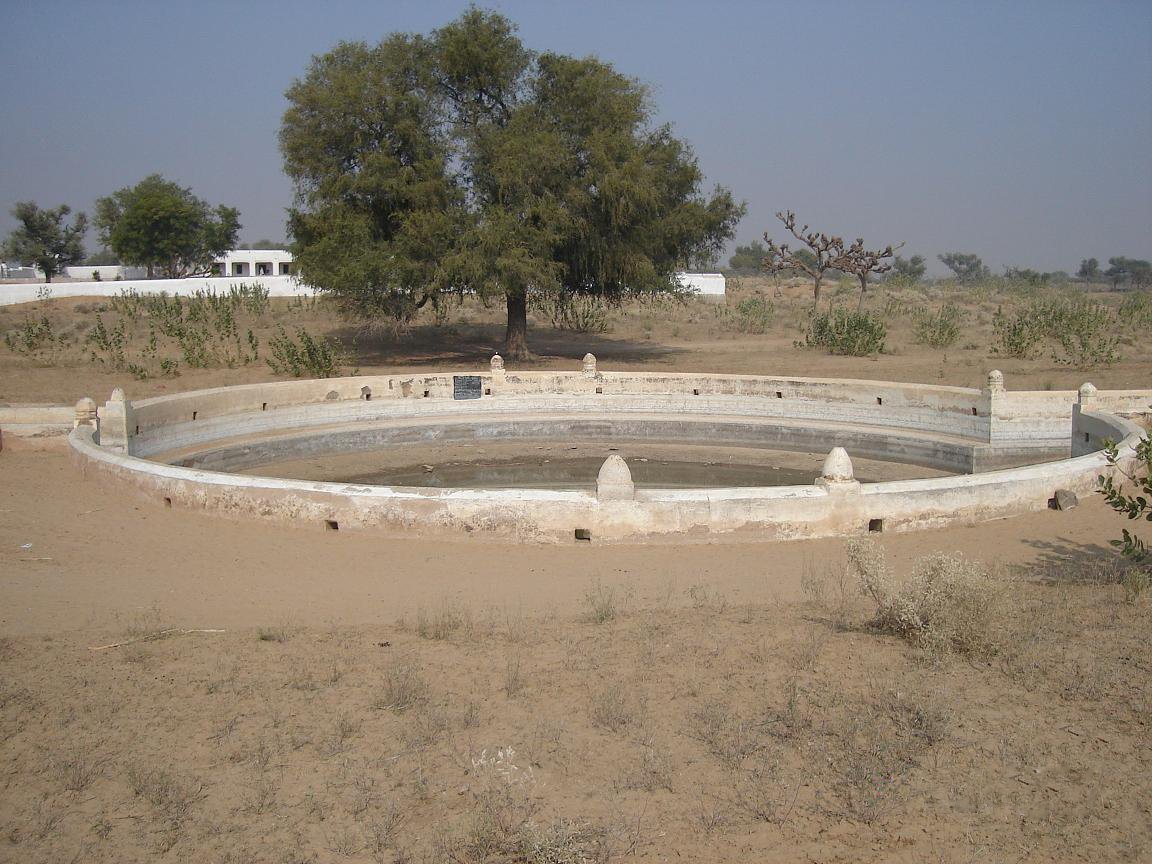
View of a tanki in Thathawata village in Rajasthan

The following are similar to the johads but are still distinct types of water bodies with specific differentiating features.

=== Tanka ===
A Taanka or Tanki is a rain-fed water storage in the arid areas of the Indian subcontinent, such as Rajasthan, specially in the bagar tract.

=== Diggi ===
A Diggi is a canal-fed water works for rural drinking-water supply. It is usually a purpose-dug open pond, smaller than the typical johad, often concretised to prevent the water loss.

=== List of related waterbodies ===
- India
  - Bawdi (Stepwell)
  - Check dam
  - Ghat
  - Tube well
  - Water well
- Other areas
  - Cistern, ancient Greek
  - Dhunge dhara, Nepal
  - Dujiangyan, ancient Chinese system
  - Liman irrigation system, Israel
  - Semicircular bund
  - Subak (irrigation), ancient Balinese Hindu water conservation system
  - Tank cascade system (Sri Lanka)
  - Traditional water sources of Persian antiquity
    - Ab anbar, ancient Persian cistern
    - Howz, water tank
    - Qanat, ancient Persian irrigation system
    - Terenah, irrigation system
    - Yakhchal, ancient Persian ice tower for water conservation

== Related regional terms ==
- Barani, Nehri, Nalli, Khadir and Bangar and Doab
- Dhani (settlement type) and Chak (village)
- Deshwali dialect
- Jangladesh
- Bhattiana
- Punjab region

== See also ==
- Water supply and sanitation in the Indus-Saraswati Valley Civilisation
- History of stepwells in Gujarat
- Important water resource topics of India
- National Water Policy of India
- Water conservation in India
