= Tarun Bharat Sangh =

Tarun Bharat Sangh (TBS) is a non-profitable environmental NGO; with its headquarters in Bheekampura, Alwar, Rajasthan. Rajendra Singh has been the incumbent chairman of TBS since 1985. TBS started their work with mobilizing communities around the issue of water, and supporting them in reviving and revitalising the traditional systems of water management through construction of johads, anicuts, and bunds for rainwater harvesting from shramdan and partly by TBS. TBS has built on existing cultural traditions of the area to revive the feeling of oneness with nature which existed in the village communities and to create an understanding and ethos of integrated ecosystem development. At present, the contribution of the organisation is spread around 1000 villages of 15 districts of the state of Rajasthan. The organisation has rejuvenated and revived 11 rivers in the state of Rajasthan naming, Ruparel, Sarsa, Arvari, Bhagani, Jahajwali, Shabi, and has established about 11,800 johads. As a result of these contributions TBS was awarded with Stockholm Water Prize in 2015. Presently, TBS’ focus rests upon access to water by rejuvenation of water resources, tackling issues like human and wildlife conflicts, and combating the mining mafias for the benefit of the local community located there.

== History ==
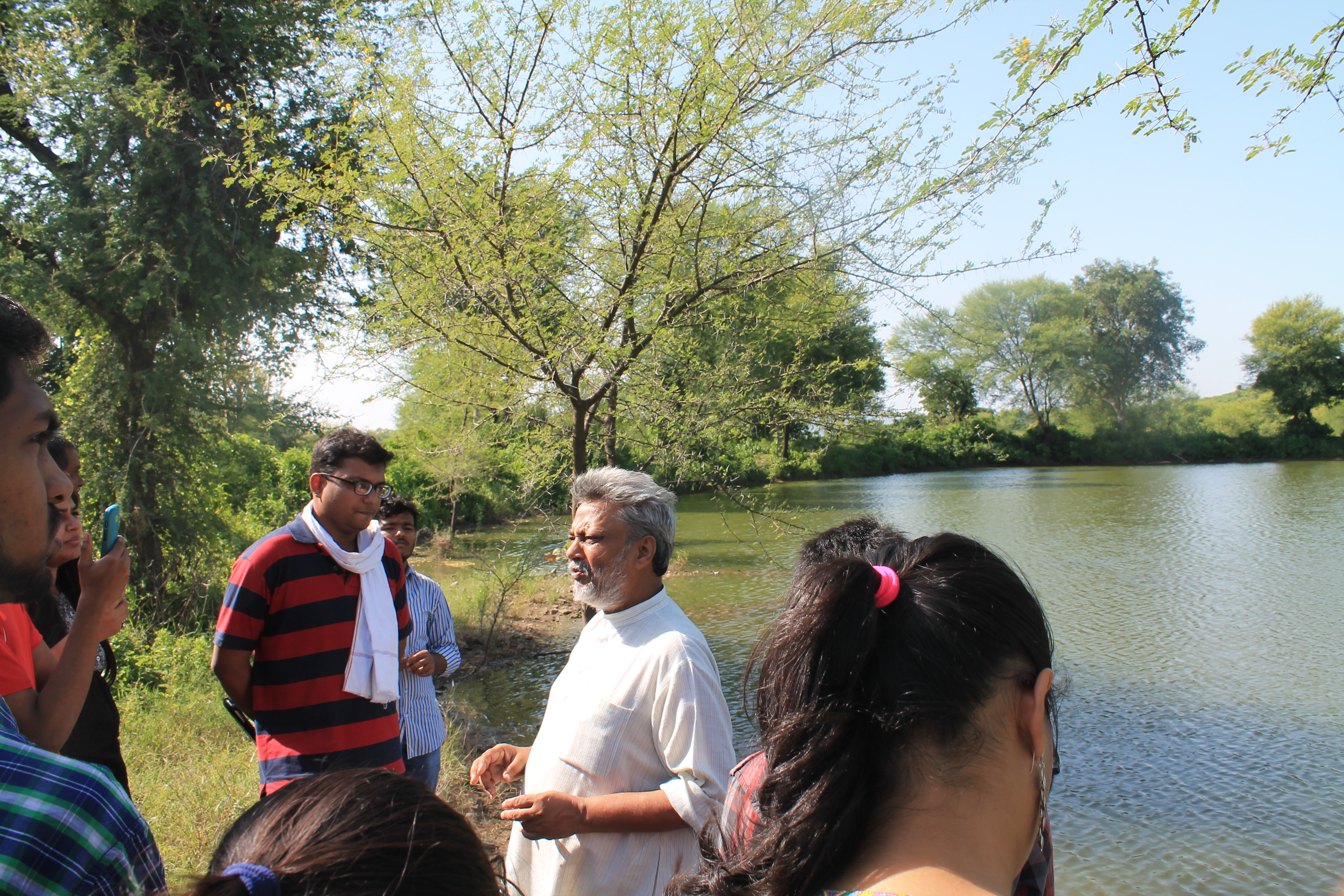
Rajendra Singh, founder of Tarun Bharat Sangh NGO explaining the use of a johad to the students of TERI University in Alwar district of Rajasthan

Tarun Bharat Sangh was founded in 1975 in Jaipur by a group of students and professors from the University of Rajasthan. In 1985 the direction of the organization changed when four young members of the organization went to live in the rural area of Alwar to teach rural children and do rural development. Of those four, Rajendra Singh stayed when the other three left. He asked the local people what they needed most, and he found that they needed easier access to water. With the villagers he organized the building of a johad, which is a traditional rainwater storage tank.

== Policy and advocacy ==
TBS is focused on self-governance and political empowerment for villagers living around exploited rivers. For example, TBS felicitated the creation of Arvari river parliament which represents 72 villages and their interests in sustaining their water resources. The river parliament produced guidelines to regulate the use of resources and types of crops planted in the river basin in order to manage the levels of water.

Jal Biradari (Water Community) was established in 1999 and was integral in raising awareness about the river crisis of Rajasthan on a national scale. On 1 August 2007, TBS initiated a protest against the construction for Commonwealth Games on the Yamuna river bed. Later, the chief minister Mrs Sheila Dixit and Governor Mr. Tejender Khanna were issued instructions to prohibit construction on the river bed.

TBS has also focused on preserving the natural forest ecosystems through its SAVE THE TIGER CAMPAIGN. The Campaign was started with students and teachers in neighbouring schools of the Sariska Reserve Forest. Upon investigation it was revealed that poachers along with the mining mafia were killing tigers. When TBS began its work in Sariska in 1985 there were only 5 tigers in the forest. By 1995, a number of rainwater harvesting structures (RWHS) were constructed and water started flowing in the rivers of Sariska. Subsequently, a number of ponds were constructed in the forest throughout the year. Due to the abundance of water resources, it became very difficult for poachers to guess where the tiger will drink water and put the trap together. Their efforts gained mass support from the villagers in the area and by 1996 the no. of tigers increased to 28. This reflects TBS’s philosophy to restore natural balance in the ecology.

Before TBS interventions in Rajasthan women spent average of 6–18 hours daily fetching waters from rivers and procuring fuel. During TBS water conservation efforts, the organisation "promoted women’s participation in a society where women are not vocal" said Mr PV Rajagopal. As a result of the flowing water women did not have to go to far off places to collect water and firewood which saved their energy and time, and improve the quality of their life. In 2011 as a result, the state of Rajasthan’s literacy rate was 71% from 61% in 2001. And female literacy rates increased from 43% in 2001 to 70% in 2011. Finally, women’s role in agriculture increased as more land was brought into cultivation.

=== Anti-Mining Campaign in Sariska ===
Damage to land and Forest and threat to the survival of biodiversity was done by the illegal and senseless mining. Mining exercises had been carried out places even where it was not permissible as per the regulations determining and governing the Sariska Tiger Project and National Park Status. At the same time, A PIL (Public Interest Litigation) filed in the Supreme Court against mining had led to prohibition made by Supreme Court to sanction and issue new mining leases. TBS filed a petition to the SC on 11 October 1991 to go into calling a halt to mining activities as also delimiting the sariska area. So much desperate and vexed interest of the mine-owners even fatally assaulted the General Secretary of TBS in the presence of the chairperson of the commission, and state and district administrative and police officials. At several places, TBS activists were assaulted to demoralise them. By this time the national press had started championing the TBS cause and TBS decided to take the battle to its logical conclusion. The apex court found the mine owners guilty of assaulting the TBS General Secretary and awarded appropriate imprisonment to the offender. The Environment Ministry of the GOI issued a notification to ban mining and industrial activities, in view of the alarming ecological degradation of the Aravallis. But the state government, under pressure from several quarters didn’t comply with the court orders. Not losing the pace, TBS spearheaded a Satyagraha, SARISKA BACHAO ANDOLAN in Jan 1993 on specific demand of closing down the mines. On 4 April 1993 the mine owners manhandled Dr Rajeev Dhawan, Advocate SC and the TBS activists. The offenders did not stop at that and attacked even the dispensary at TBS ashram. In a quick succession of events the SC ordered the Gov. of Rajasthan to stop all mining activity immediately. In May 1993, the SC ordered the state government to provide protection cover to TBS. Beginning 2 October 1993 Aravalli Bachao Yatra was launched all through the Aravalli range (from Himmatnagar in Gujarat to Delhi, via Rajasthan and Haryana). On 6 May 1994 the SC granted pardon to the assaulters, when they paid for it. With a warning of dire consequences of such act was committed again. On 6 May 1994, the Govt. of Rajasthan designated 8 April 1993 verdict of the SC as tentative which resulted in reopening of Sariska delimitation Issue. TBS did not stop working towards creation of water harvesting structures and soil management based on the traditional wisdom of the people in the Sariska Region. TBS can legitimately congratulate itself that it is playing the role of a catalyst in the awareness and confidence building campaign among the people.

=== Tarun Water School ===
It sprouted up during National water literacy campaign. The school focuses on enhancing the understanding and skills of those working on the issues of the water management. It also helps in educating farmers, professionals, social workers on traditional and TBS innovated water management practices . The school also has collaborations with research universities, institutions abroad to explore issues related to water resource management.

=== Rejuvenating rivers ===
TBS has constructed 11,800 johads with the involvement and contribution of villagers. It continues its exemplary work like Arvari sansad . It originated after rejuvenation effort by TBS and innovative community approach of Dr. Rajendra Singh. (Arvari Sansad represents 72 villages, which meets twice a year). The primary objective is to safeguard and integrate water management efforts of the community in river catchments. The sansad also played crucial role to protect the community against fish harvesting contractors and its exploitation.(2) Rashtriya Jal Biradari (28), which works towards organising local communities in villages across India to work on water. The initiative was incepted in the national water convention held in April 2001. The initiative has more than 1000 members. At the present, it focuses on "save the river campaign. (3) Rashtriya Jal Chetna (National water awareness campaign), is an effort to sensitise people across India on the adverse effect of National water policy of government of India on linking of 37 rivers on all over the India. IN 14 months, the campaign touched 320 districts in 30 states of India and metro concerned persons in 90 cities and four metropolises.

== See also ==
- Rajendra Singh
- G. D. Agrawal
- Anil Agarwal (environmentalist)
