= Arvari River =

River in Rajasthan and Uttar Pradesh, India

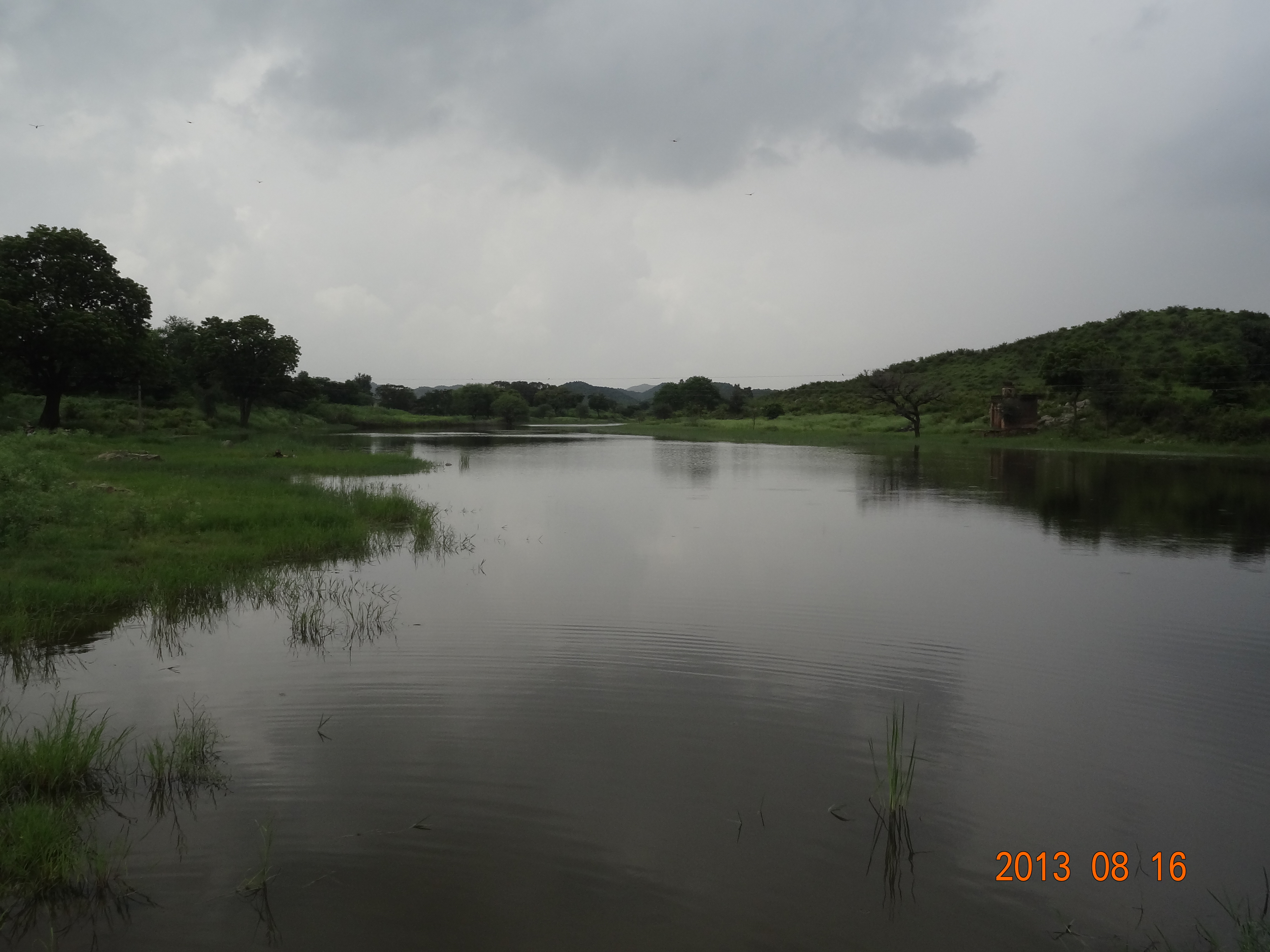
- Arvari River at Hamirpur village

Location
- Country: India

Physical characteristics
- Source: Sakra Dam near Thanagazi in Alwar District, Rajasthan
- Mouth: Confluence with Yamuna in Mainpuri district of Uttar Pradesh
- Length: 45 km (28 mi)
- Basin size: 492 km^{2} (190 mi^{2})

Basin features
- Notable Features: Flow restoration after 60 years, Arvari Parliament formation

The Arvari River, which originates in Aravalli range, is a small river flowing through the Alwar District of Rajasthan, India. It has a total length of 45 km (28 mi) and a total basin area of 492 km^{2} (190 sq mi). Downstream of the Sainthal Sagar dam on Arvari, the Arvari river meets Sarsa River to become the Sanwan River. The Sanwan meets the Tildah and Banganga rivers to converge with the Gambhir (also known as the Utang river). Gambhir then converges with the Yamuna in Mainpuri district of Uttar Pradesh, Yamuna converges with Ganges at Triveni Sangam in Prayagraj.

It is notable for having its flow restored after being dry for 60 years. This process began in 1986, and required the efforts of the people of the Bhanota-Kolyala village, with the help of Dr. Rajendra Singh. The villages that lay in the river's catchment area built earthen dams, with largest being 244 m long and 7 m wide. Following the construction of 375 dams, the river started to flow again, becoming a perennial river in 1995. The Arvari River Parliament was formed in 1998 to help maintain the health of the river.

== Basin ==
Key features are as follows:

- Total basin area: 492 km^{2}
- Total Length of flowing river: 45 km
- Length of river: 35 km
- Total water structures: 402

=== Origin ===
The river Arvari originates in the Sakra Dam near Thanagazi in the Alwar District. The northern catchment area of the river is around Kankad ki dhani. Of the two sources of the river, one source originates from Bhairudev Public Wildlife Sanctuary near the village Bhavta Kaliyal (Bhuriyawas), the other near Amka and Jodhula. There is a third stream close to second source, which is lost into the ground. The two streams meet near Ajabgarh- Pratapgarh, at Palasana ka Pahad. From this point, the river is called Arvari and runs down to the village Hamirpur to meet Nahar Nala, a stream from the west.

=== Drainage ===
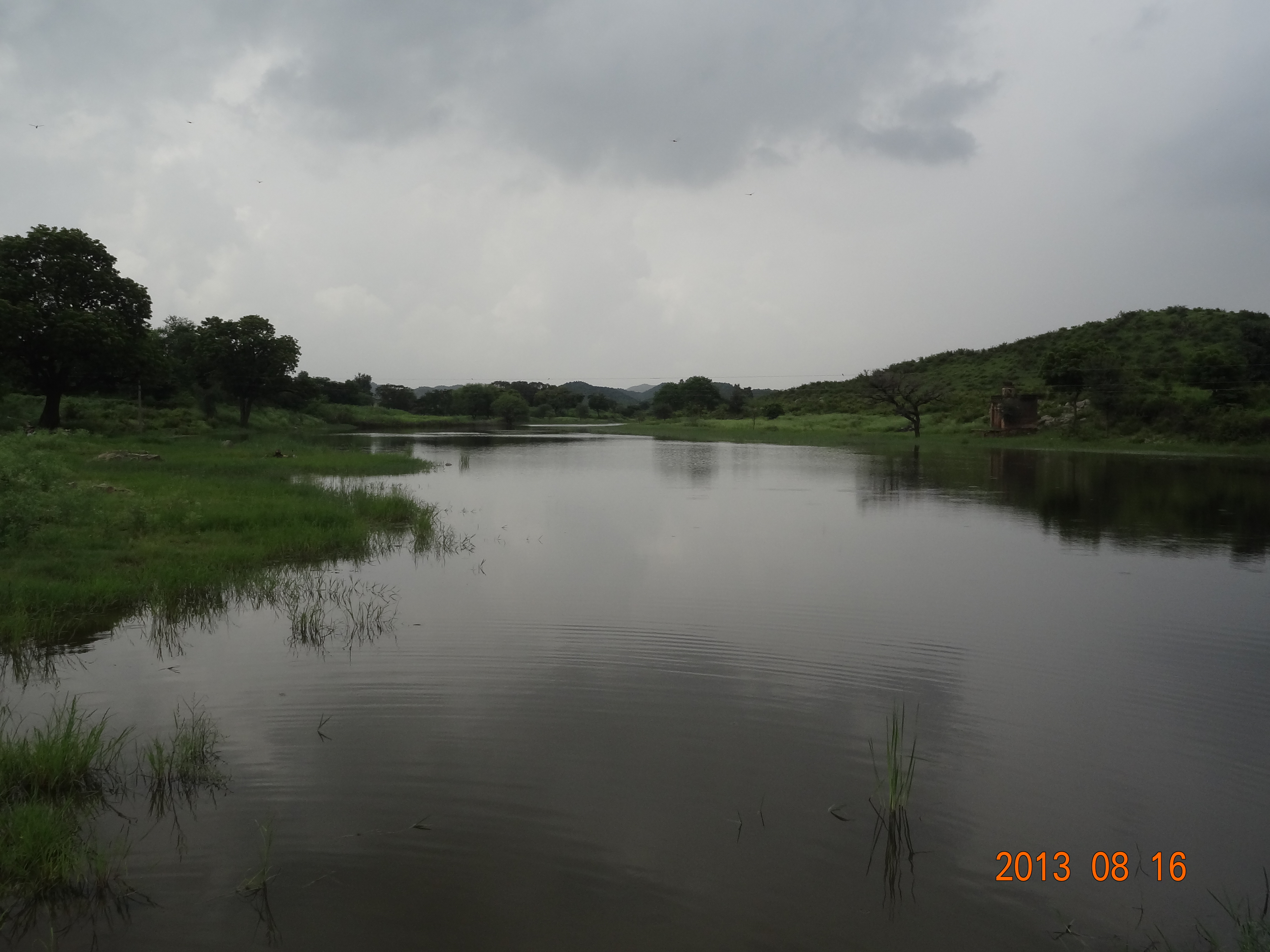
Arvari River at Hamirpur village

Another tributary, the Bidila river, originates in Jamwa Ramgargh, Jaipur, and augments the Arvari. The augmented river joins an equally large tributary originating around Lothabas in the west near Romewala, then passing through the Jaitpur Gujrun, Rasayawala and Rayanwala regions. Here, the Aravari becomes large enough to feed its own reservoir, Sainthal Sagar, which was formed by a large dam on the same river. Following the dam, the Arvari river meets Sarsa to become the Sanwan River. The Sanwan meets the Tildah and Banganga to join the Gambhir, also known as the Utang river. Gambhir then meets the Yamuna near Prayaraj in Allahabad.

== Conservation ==
=== Arvari Sansad (Arvari Parliament) ===
Following the rebirth of the Arvari river in 1996, led by community efforts, the issue of Arvari's ownership remained. The Government of Rajasthan's claim over the river, was heavily opposed by locals who had worked for years to restore the waterway. The state government awarded contracts for fishing in the Arvari river without the knowledge of the people of different villages residing on the bank of the river, which affected the lives and livelihoods of residents, giving rise to protests and non-cooperation.

The state government then filed a case against the local community of the Arvari basin upon the issue of ownership. The high court passed judgement stating that the state government would maintain ownership of the river until a designated system was established by the people, resulting in people from 72 villages coming forward to form the Arvari Parliament. The main purpose of the Arvari Parliament is to monitor and care for the water bodies of the Arvari River, and plan the usage of water and related issues to ensure the sustainability of the river. Owing to successful water harvesting methods, the Arvari river has become a perennial river from a seasonal water body.

Through the community centre's water management approach, on 26 January 1999, 162 members from the Arvari basin formed the Arvari Parliament. The parliament meets biannually, the meetings six months apart. The first session of the Arvari Parliament was held in Hamirpur village from 27 to 28 January 1999, under the chairmanship of Shri. Siddharaj Dadhadha. The 36th session took place on 23 December 2018 at Tarun Bharat Sangh, Bheekampura, Alwar district, Rajasthan, under the chairmanship of Shri. Ram Pratap Meena.

The members of the Arvari Parliament were awarded for the community work of River Rejuvenation by the contemporary President of India, Shri. K. R. Narayanan, on 28 March 2000. This was the first time in the history of India where the President officially recognized a community for such work, rather than the Rastrapati Bhavan. On 3 November 2003, Prince Charles visited the Arvari River basin to recognize the work of the community and was escorted by Dr. Rajendra Singh and members of the local community.

A sub-branch to the Parliament, the Arvari River Child Parliament was formed on 20 August 2013 with the aim of providing education on responsible water management to the next generation residents in the Arvari river basin.

=== Rejuvenation of Arvari River ===
In 1985, a drought in the region dried the river bed, and the river was lost. The TBS, along with the local community, started work for water on the river basin of Arvari in 1987 to restore the river. As a result of this, in 1996, the Arvari river started flowing throughout the year.

The river was awarded the International River Prize in 2004. In March 2000, then President, K. R. Narayanan, visited the area to present the "Down to Earth — Joseph. C. John Award" to the villagers. Dr. Rajendra Singh was awarded the Magsaysay Award in 2001.

== See also ==
- Sahibi River
- List of rivers of Rajasthan
- List of rivers of India
