= Climate of Rajasthan =

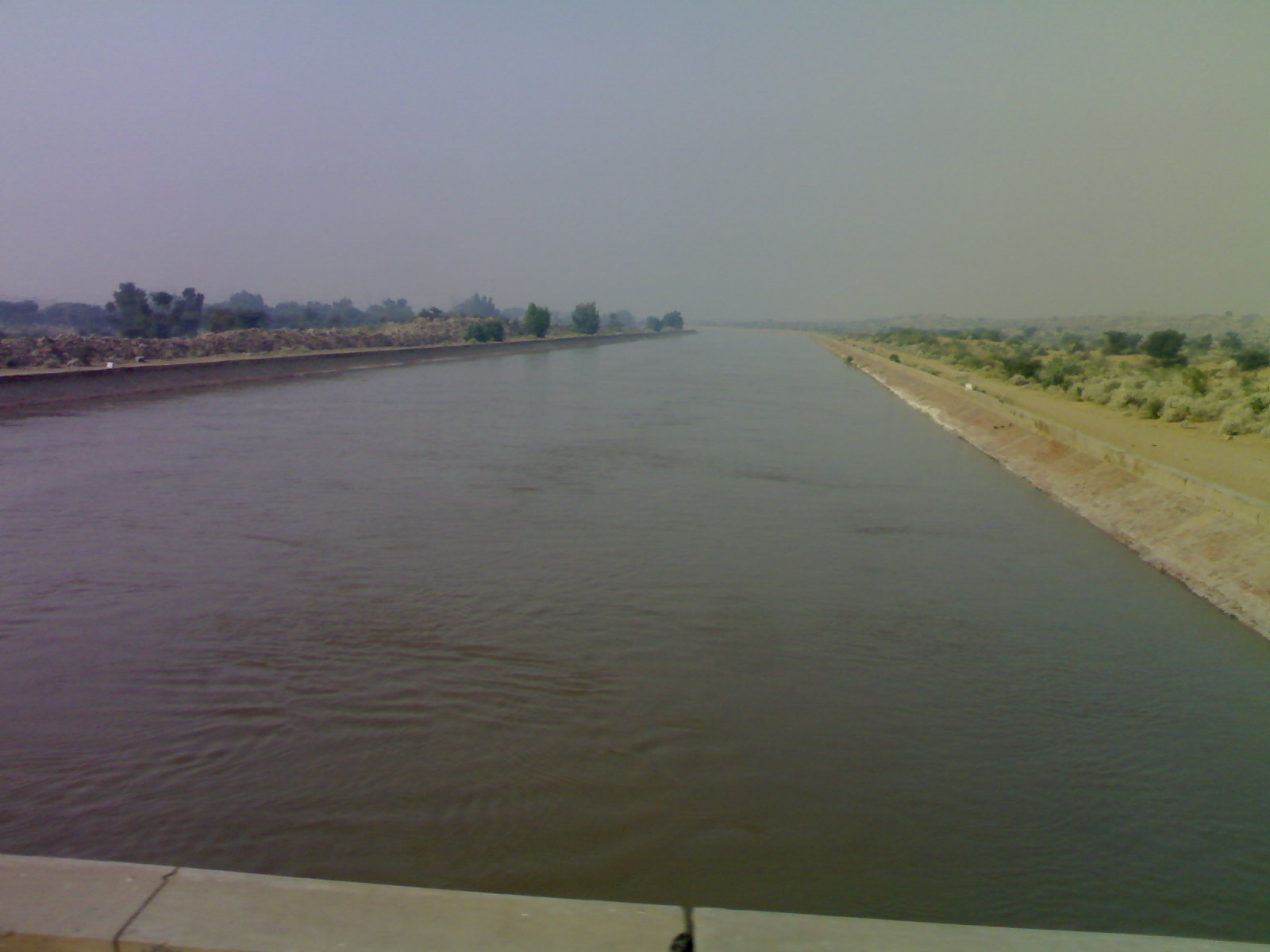
Indira Gandhi Canal was necessitated by water scarcity in Thar Desert, covering western part of Rajasthan.

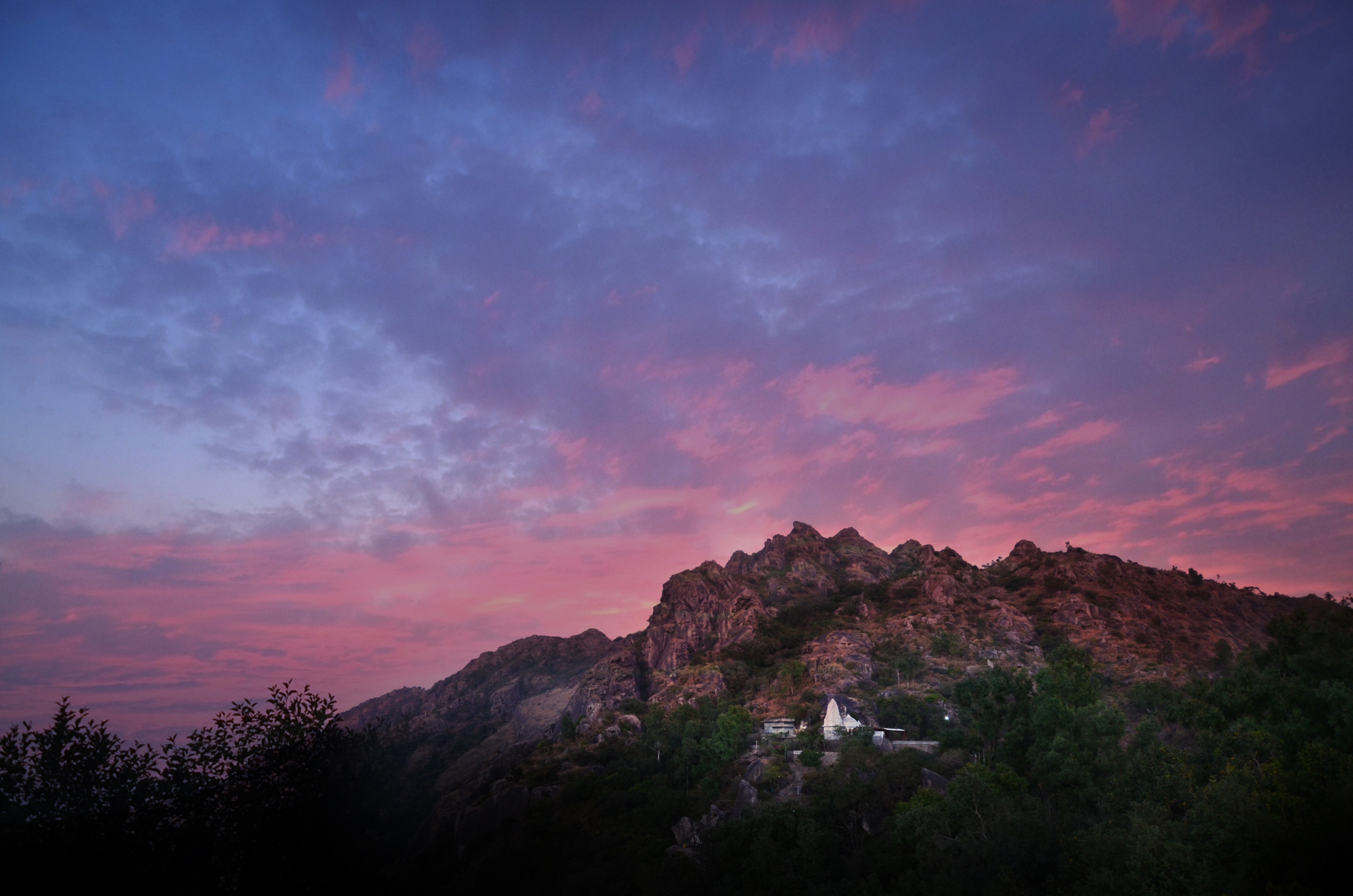
Mount Abu is one of the coolest places in Rajasthan.

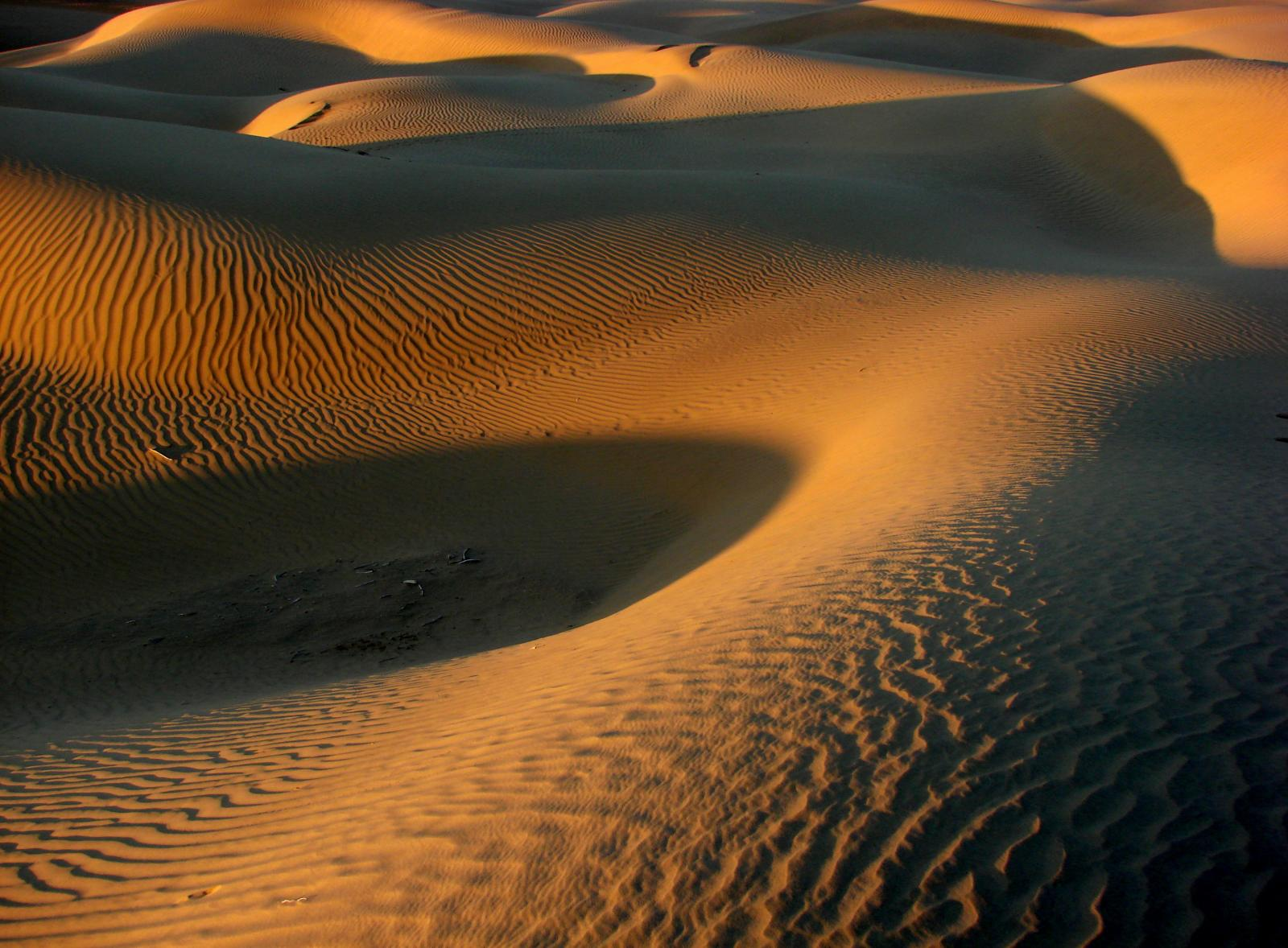
The Thar Desert near Jaisalmer.

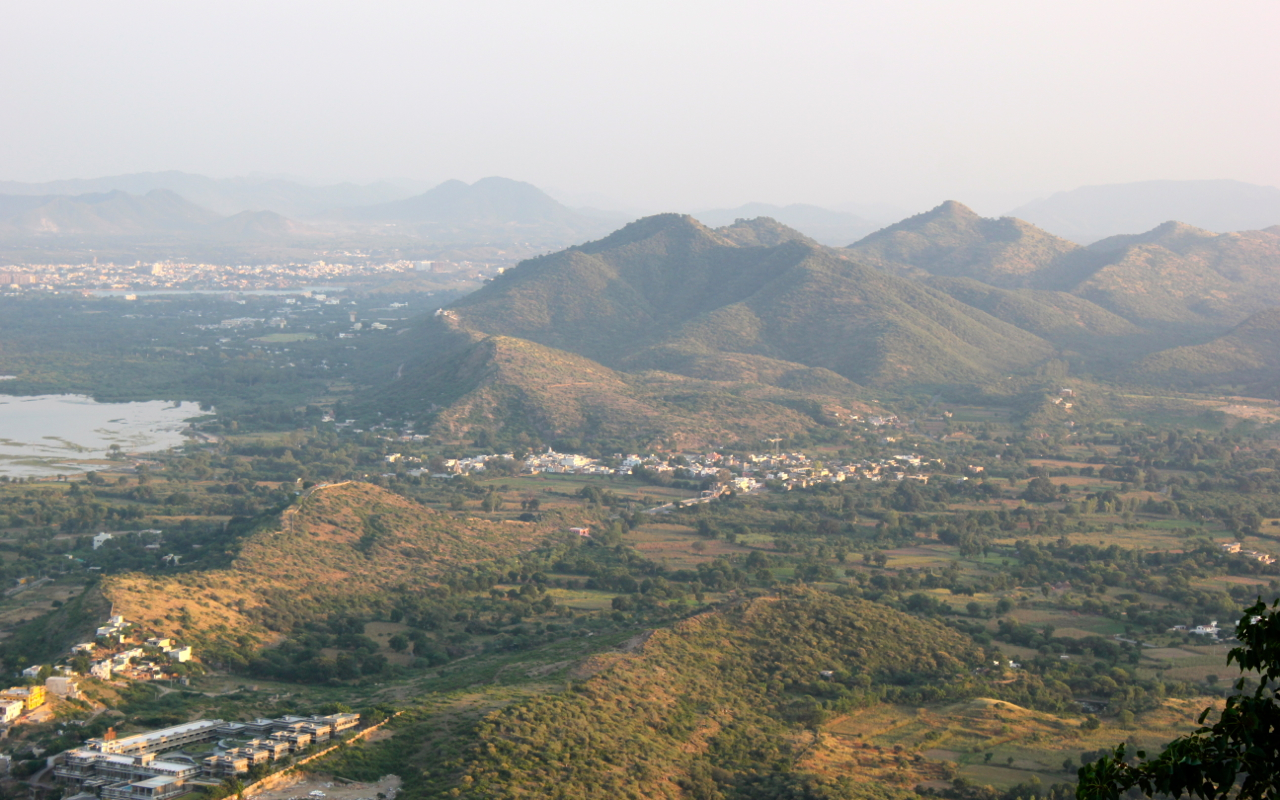
Aerial view Udaipur and Aravali hills.

The climate of Rajasthan in northwestern India is generally arid or semi-arid and features fairly hot temperatures over the year with extreme temperatures in both summer and winter. The hottest months are May and June. The monsoon season is from July to September; however, rainfall remains moderate.

== History ==
Under the Köppen climate classification the greater part of Rajasthan falls under Hot Desert (BWh) and remaining portions of the state falls under Hot Semi Arid (BSh); the climate of the state ranges from arid to semi-arid. Rajasthan receives low and variable rainfalls and thereby is prone to droughts. While Rajasthan is a dry and hot state, hailstorms may rarely occur, as in December 2019, a hailstorm covered Nagaur, Rajasthan in a thin snow-like icy blanket. Later on, it was clarified that this was not snowfall but a hailstorm which had been endorsed by western disturbances. The climate has changed in winters like never before.

== Seasons ==
=== Summer ===
Due to the Desert Geography, frequently climb above 40 to 45 degrees Celsius in most places. Due to its location, summers are the longest season in Rajasthan. In this time tourist activities are very low.

=== Winter ===
The cold weather commences early in October and ends around the end of February and sometimes the temperatures reach nearly 2-degree Celsius [*record in 1964 in JAIPUR the temperature reached 0-degree Celsius on 13 December]. This period is considered the peak season for tourism and festivals in the state due to the comfortable daytime temperatures.

=== Monsoon ===
The state has two distinct periods of rainfall: rainfall due to the South-West Monsoon after summer and rainfall due to Western Disturbances.

=== Temperature ===
Average temperatures in various cities of Rajasthan(°C)
| | Winter (Jan – Feb) | | Summer (Mar – May) | | | Monsoon (Jun – Sep) | | | | Post-monsoon (Oct – Dec) | | | Year-round |
| | Jan | Feb | Mar | Apr | May | Jun | Jul | Aug | Sep | Oct | Nov | Dec | Avg |
| Jaipur(Highest) | 22.4 | 25.0 | 31.0 | 37.1 | 40.3 | 39.3 | 34.1 | 32.4 | 33.8 | 33.6 | 29.2 | 24.4 | 31.9 |
| Jaipur(Lowest) | 08.4 | 10.8 | 16.0 | 21.8 | 25.9 | 27.4 | 25.8 | 24.7 | 23.2 | 19.4 | 13.8 | 9.2 | 18.8 |

=== Precipitation ===
Average precipitation in various cities of Rajasthan(mm)
| — | Winter (Jan – Feb) | | Summer (Mar – May) | | | Monsoon (Jun – Sep) | | | | Post-monsoon (Oct – Dec) | | | Year-round |
| City | Jan | Feb | Mar | Apr | May | Jun | Jul | Aug | Sep | Oct | Nov | Dec | Total |
| Jaipur | 7.0 | 10.6 | 3.1 | 4.9 | 17.9 | 63.4 | 223.3 | 205.9 | 66.3 | 25.0 | 3.9 | 4.2 | 637.4 |

== Disasters ==
=== Drought and famine ===
Rajasthan receives low and variable rainfalls and thereby is prone to droughts. Availability of water is less due to the absence of rivers and lakes.

=== Floods ===
Occasional floods in cities due to improper drainage occurs. Sometimes floods also occur in western Rajasthan due to impervious base rocks.

== Pollution ==
In some industrial and urban centers pollution has been reported occasionally.

== Climate data ==
Climate data for Jaipur (Köppen BSh)
| Month | Jan | Feb | Mar | Apr | May | Jun | Jul | Aug | Sep | Oct | Nov | Dec | Year |
|---|---|---|---|---|---|---|---|---|---|---|---|---|---|
| Record high °C (°F) | 31.7 (89.1) | 36.7 (98.1) | 42.8 (109.0) | 44.9 (112.8) | 49.0 (120.2) | 47.2 (117.0) | 46.7 (116.1) | 41.7 (107.1) | 41.7 (107.1) | 40.0 (104.0) | 36.4 (97.5) | 31.5 (88.7) | 49.0 (120.2) |
| Mean maximum °C (°F) | 27.2 (81.0) | 31.4 (88.5) | 37.1 (98.8) | 41.9 (107.4) | 44.3 (111.7) | 43.7 (110.7) | 39.4 (102.9) | 36.1 (97.0) | 37.5 (99.5) | 36.9 (98.4) | 33.1 (91.6) | 28.3 (82.9) | 44.8 (112.6) |
| Mean daily maximum °C (°F) | 22.6 (72.7) | 25.7 (78.3) | 31.6 (88.9) | 37.4 (99.3) | 40.7 (105.3) | 39.6 (103.3) | 34.6 (94.3) | 32.7 (90.9) | 34.2 (93.6) | 33.8 (92.8) | 29.3 (84.7) | 24.5 (76.1) | 32.2 (90.0) |
| Mean daily minimum °C (°F) | 8.6 (47.5) | 11.4 (52.5) | 16.8 (62.2) | 22.2 (72.0) | 26.5 (79.7) | 27.7 (81.9) | 26.1 (79.0) | 24.8 (76.6) | 23.6 (74.5) | 19.6 (67.3) | 14.0 (57.2) | 9.5 (49.1) | 19.2 (66.6) |
| Mean minimum °C (°F) | 3.8 (38.8) | 6.1 (43.0) | 11.3 (52.3) | 16.7 (62.1) | 20.9 (69.6) | 22.2 (72.0) | 23.1 (73.6) | 22.3 (72.1) | 20.8 (69.4) | 15.2 (59.4) | 9.1 (48.4) | 4.8 (40.6) | 3.5 (38.3) |
| Record low °C (°F) | −2.2 (28.0) | −2.2 (28.0) | 3.3 (37.9) | 9.4 (48.9) | 15.6 (60.1) | 19.1 (66.4) | 20.6 (69.1) | 18.9 (66.0) | 15.0 (59.0) | 11.1 (52.0) | 3.3 (37.9) | 0.0 (32.0) | −2.2 (28.0) |
| Average rainfall mm (inches) | 5.9 (0.23) | 10.2 (0.40) | 4.4 (0.17) | 7.1 (0.28) | 12.2 (0.48) | 61.9 (2.44) | 190.5 (7.50) | 203.4 (8.01) | 79.6 (3.13) | 19.4 (0.76) | 1.9 (0.07) | 3.8 (0.15) | 600.3 (23.63) |
| Average rainy days | 0.6 | 0.9 | 0.7 | 0.9 | 1.3 | 4.2 | 9.4 | 9.8 | 4.8 | 1.2 | 0.2 | 0.3 | 34.3 |
| Average relative humidity (%) (at 17:30 IST) | 37 | 29 | 21 | 17 | 19 | 33 | 60 | 67 | 50 | 31 | 34 | 39 | 36 |
| Average dew point °C (°F) | 6 (43) | 7 (45) | 7 (45) | 8 (46) | 12 (54) | 19 (66) | 24 (75) | 24 (75) | 21 (70) | 13 (55) | 9 (48) | 6 (43) | 13 (55) |
| Average ultraviolet index | 5 | 7 | 9 | 11 | 12 | 12 | 12 | 12 | 10 | 8 | 6 | 5 | 9 |
Source 1: India Meteorological Department Time and Date (dewpoints, 2005–2015)
Source 2: Weather Atlas

Climate data for Jodhpur (Köppen BWh/BSh)
| Month | Jan | Feb | Mar | Apr | May | Jun | Jul | Aug | Sep | Oct | Nov | Dec | Year |
|---|---|---|---|---|---|---|---|---|---|---|---|---|---|
| Record high °C (°F) | 31.2 (88.2) | 36.0 (96.8) | 41.6 (106.9) | 45.0 (113.0) | 48.9 (120.0) | 47.8 (118.0) | 42.6 (108.7) | 40.3 (104.5) | 42.5 (108.5) | 40.6 (105.1) | 37.5 (99.5) | 32.3 (90.1) | 48.9 (120.0) |
| Mean daily maximum °C (°F) | 24.5 (76.1) | 27.4 (81.3) | 33.4 (92.1) | 38.4 (101.1) | 41.2 (106.2) | 40.0 (104.0) | 35.2 (95.4) | 33.5 (92.3) | 34.9 (94.8) | 35.8 (96.4) | 31.2 (88.2) | 26.9 (80.4) | 33.5 (92.3) |
| Mean daily minimum °C (°F) | 9.6 (49.3) | 11.7 (53.1) | 17.3 (63.1) | 22.6 (72.7) | 26.5 (79.7) | 27.8 (82.0) | 26.4 (79.5) | 25.4 (77.7) | 23.9 (75.0) | 20.1 (68.2) | 14.7 (58.5) | 11.2 (52.2) | 19.8 (67.6) |
| Record low °C (°F) | 1.8 (35.2) | 0.7 (33.3) | 4.4 (39.9) | 15.6 (60.1) | 15.4 (59.7) | 20.0 (68.0) | 21.0 (69.8) | 21.2 (70.2) | 18.4 (65.1) | 12.5 (54.5) | 5.8 (42.4) | 1.7 (35.1) | 0.7 (33.3) |
| Average rainfall mm (inches) | 4.0 (0.16) | 4.0 (0.16) | 1.3 (0.05) | 4.8 (0.19) | 17.4 (0.69) | 40.0 (1.57) | 120.5 (4.74) | 111.8 (4.40) | 49.9 (1.96) | 6.9 (0.27) | 1.9 (0.07) | 0.5 (0.02) | 362.9 (14.29) |
| Average rainy days | 0.3 | 0.6 | 0.3 | 0.6 | 1.2 | 2.1 | 6.5 | 5.9 | 2.6 | 0.6 | 0.2 | 0.0 | 21.0 |
| Average relative humidity (%) (at 17:30 IST) | 27 | 24 | 22 | 19 | 20 | 33 | 52 | 58 | 45 | 29 | 32 | 33 | 32 |
| Average dew point °C (°F) | 6 (43) | 7 (45) | 7 (45) | 8 (46) | 12 (54) | 19 (66) | 24 (75) | 24 (75) | 21 (70) | 13 (55) | 9 (48) | 6 (43) | 13 (55) |
| Mean monthly sunshine hours | 303.8 | 291.0 | 288.3 | 279.0 | 285.2 | 132.0 | 96.1 | 120.9 | 180.0 | 232.5 | 270.0 | 294.5 | 2,773.3 |
| Mean daily sunshine hours | 9.8 | 10.3 | 9.3 | 9.3 | 9.2 | 4.4 | 3.1 | 3.9 | 6.0 | 7.5 | 9.0 | 9.5 | 7.6 |
| Average ultraviolet index | 5 | 7 | 9 | 11 | 12 | 12 | 12 | 12 | 10 | 8 | 6 | 5 | 9 |
Source 1: India Meteorological Department (sun 1971–2000) Time and Date (dewpoints, 2005–2015)
Source 2: Weather Atlas

Climate data for Bikaner (Köppen BWh/BSh)
| Month | Jan | Feb | Mar | Apr | May | Jun | Jul | Aug | Sep | Oct | Nov | Dec | Year |
|---|---|---|---|---|---|---|---|---|---|---|---|---|---|
| Record high °C (°F) | 32.9 (91.2) | 37.2 (99.0) | 42.8 (109.0) | 47.2 (117.0) | 49.4 (120.9) | 48.9 (120.0) | 47.8 (118.0) | 43.4 (110.1) | 43.9 (111.0) | 42.2 (108.0) | 38.5 (101.3) | 33.5 (92.3) | 49.4 (120.9) |
| Mean daily maximum °C (°F) | 23.4 (74.1) | 26.6 (79.9) | 32.4 (90.3) | 38.4 (101.1) | 42.0 (107.6) | 41.6 (106.9) | 38.6 (101.5) | 37.3 (99.1) | 37.6 (99.7) | 36.2 (97.2) | 31.1 (88.0) | 25.6 (78.1) | 34.2 (93.6) |
| Mean daily minimum °C (°F) | 7.3 (45.1) | 10.9 (51.6) | 16.7 (62.1) | 22.6 (72.7) | 27.4 (81.3) | 29.3 (84.7) | 28.4 (83.1) | 27.2 (81.0) | 25.7 (78.3) | 20.2 (68.4) | 13.6 (56.5) | 8.3 (46.9) | 19.8 (67.6) |
| Record low °C (°F) | −4.0 (24.8) | −2.5 (27.5) | −0.6 (30.9) | 8.3 (46.9) | 13.7 (56.7) | 17.8 (64.0) | 20.5 (68.9) | 20.6 (69.1) | 16.5 (61.7) | 7.6 (45.7) | 0.6 (33.1) | −2.8 (27.0) | −4.0 (24.8) |
| Average rainfall mm (inches) | 6.2 (0.24) | 9.0 (0.35) | 8.4 (0.33) | 7.4 (0.29) | 29.4 (1.16) | 39.6 (1.56) | 92.5 (3.64) | 54.5 (2.15) | 25.6 (1.01) | 12.3 (0.48) | 1.0 (0.04) | 2.4 (0.09) | 288.4 (11.35) |
| Average rainy days | 0.7 | 1.0 | 0.9 | 1.1 | 1.8 | 2.3 | 5.0 | 3.5 | 2.0 | 0.4 | 0.2 | 0.2 | 19.1 |
| Average relative humidity (%) (at 17:30 IST) | 33 | 27 | 20 | 15 | 17 | 27 | 45 | 47 | 37 | 25 | 30 | 35 | 30 |
| Average dew point °C (°F) | 3 (37) | 5 (41) | 7 (45) | 9 (48) | 13 (55) | 19 (66) | 23 (73) | 23 (73) | 20 (68) | 12 (54) | 8 (46) | 5 (41) | 12 (54) |
| Average ultraviolet index | 5 | 6 | 7 | 9 | 9 | 9 | 8 | 8 | 8 | 7 | 6 | 4 | 7 |
Source 1: India Meteorological Department Time and Date (dewpoints, 2005–2015)
Source 2: Weather Atlas

Climate data for Jaisalmer (Köppen BWh/Bsh)
| Month | Jan | Feb | Mar | Apr | May | Jun | Jul | Aug | Sep | Oct | Nov | Dec | Year |
|---|---|---|---|---|---|---|---|---|---|---|---|---|---|
| Record high °C (°F) | 35.8 (96.4) | 37.8 (100.0) | 42.3 (108.1) | 45.8 (114.4) | 48.0 (118.4) | 49.2 (120.6) | 47.0 (116.6) | 43.3 (109.9) | 43.3 (109.9) | 42.2 (108.0) | 38.8 (101.8) | 34.4 (93.9) | 49.2 (120.6) |
| Mean daily maximum °C (°F) | 23.8 (74.8) | 27.3 (81.1) | 33.3 (91.9) | 39.1 (102.4) | 41.9 (107.4) | 40.9 (105.6) | 38.1 (100.6) | 36.6 (97.9) | 37.1 (98.8) | 36.5 (97.7) | 31.3 (88.3) | 25.4 (77.7) | 34.3 (93.7) |
| Mean daily minimum °C (°F) | 7.4 (45.3) | 10.8 (51.4) | 18.1 (64.6) | 21.8 (71.2) | 24.8 (76.6) | 25.8 (78.4) | 25.3 (77.5) | 25.0 (77.0) | 24.2 (75.6) | 19.4 (66.9) | 14.0 (57.2) | 8.8 (47.8) | 18.6 (65.5) |
| Record low °C (°F) | −5.9 (21.4) | −4.4 (24.1) | 3.4 (38.1) | 10.6 (51.1) | 15.1 (59.2) | 17.2 (63.0) | 20.1 (68.2) | 19.1 (66.4) | 12.9 (55.2) | 8.3 (46.9) | 2.0 (35.6) | −0.6 (30.9) | −5.9 (21.4) |
| Average rainfall mm (inches) | 1.3 (0.05) | 5.2 (0.20) | 3.3 (0.13) | 7.2 (0.28) | 17.2 (0.68) | 31.0 (1.22) | 79.2 (3.12) | 92.2 (3.63) | 39.3 (1.55) | 3.0 (0.12) | 0.7 (0.03) | 2.1 (0.08) | 271.6 (10.69) |
| Average rainy days | 0.2 | 0.6 | 0.4 | 0.5 | 0.6 | 1.2 | 5.3 | 6.2 | 2.4 | 0.3 | 0.1 | 0.2 | 17.0 |
| Average relative humidity (%) (at 17:30 IST) | 31 | 26 | 22 | 19 | 21 | 29 | 45 | 50 | 39 | 26 | 27 | 31 | 31 |
| Average dew point °C (°F) | 7 (45) | 10 (50) | 13 (55) | 14 (57) | 17 (63) | 22 (72) | 24 (75) | 24 (75) | 23 (73) | 18 (64) | 13 (55) | 9 (48) | 16 (61) |
| Average ultraviolet index | 5 | 6 | 8 | 8 | 9 | 8 | 8 | 8 | 8 | 7 | 6 | 4 | 7 |
Source 1: India Meteorological Department Time and Date (dewpoints, 2005–2015)
Source 2: Weather Atlas

== See also ==
- Climate of India
- Loo
- Thar Desert
