= Biramsar =

- city
- Location in Rajasthan, India Biramsar (India)
- Coordinates: 28.04°N 74.79°E
- Country: India
- State: Rajasthan
- District: Churu
- Elevation: 313 m (1,027 ft)

Languages
  - Official: Hindi
- Time zone: UTC+5:30 (IST)
- PIN: 331022
- Telephone code: 01567
- ISO 3166 code: RJ-IN

Biramsar is a village in Ratangarh tehsil of Churu district of Rajasthan, India.
