= Sargawan =

Village in Uttar Pradesh, India

- Village
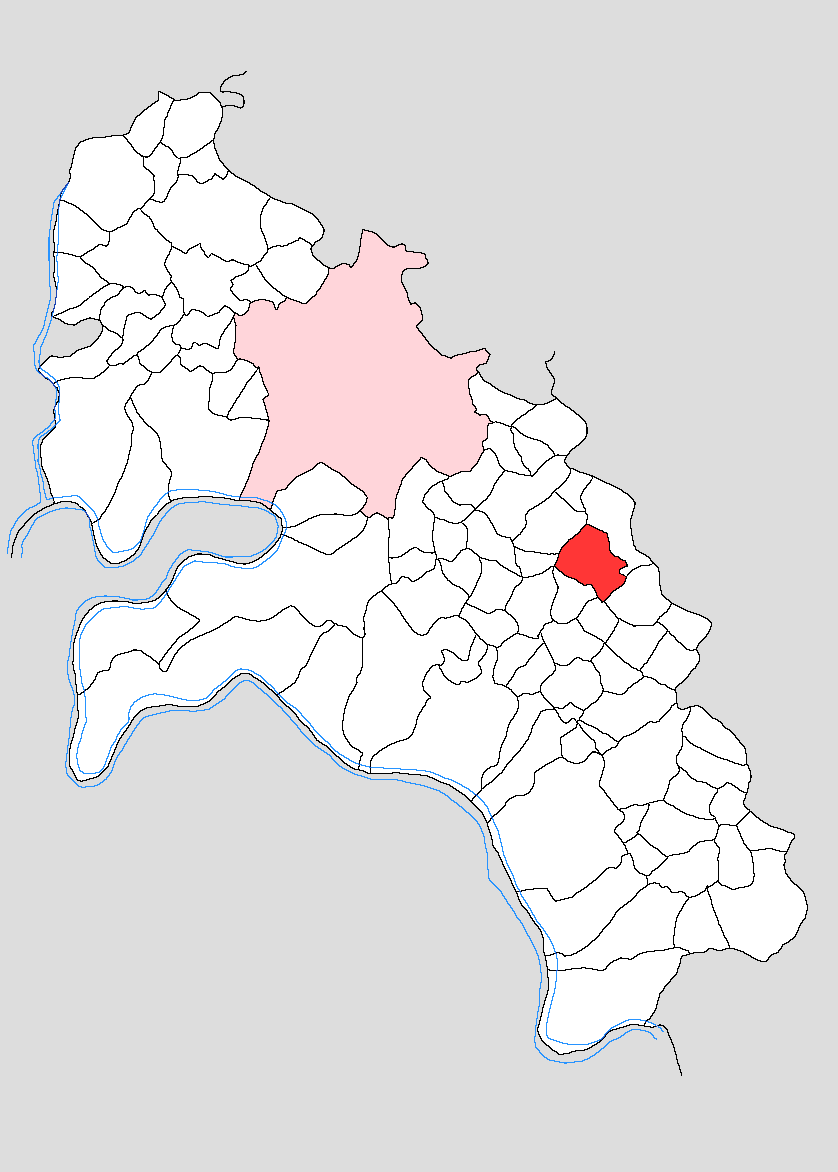
- Map showing Sargawan in Firozabad block

- Location in Uttar Pradesh, India
- Coordinates: 27.11184°N 78.46137°E
- Country: India
- State: Uttar Pradesh
- District: Firozabad
- Tehsil: Firozabad

Area
  - Total: 2.722 km^{2} (1.051 sq mi)

Population (2011)
  - Total: 2,492
  - Density: 915.5/km^{2} (2,371/sq mi)
- Time zone: UTC+5:30 (IST)

Sargawan (Sargawāṃ) is a village in Firozabad block of Firozabad district, Uttar Pradesh. It is located southeast of Firozabad, although the closest town is actually Makkhanpur to the northeast. As of 2011, it had a population of 2,492, in 452 households.

== Geography ==
Sargawan is located southeast of Firozabad. It is actually closer to the town of Makkhanpur, which about 2 km to the northeast. The tehsil boundary runs about 1 km northeast of Sargawan. The old NH 2 and the main line of the Northern Railway both pass about 1 km to the north of Sargawan. To the west-northwest is the village of Donkeli, to the south are Sherpur Anandipur and Kharsoli, and to the southeast is Baramai. Directly to the east of Sargawan are two adjoining hamlets called Nagla Kharagjit and Nagla Bhaosingh. To the north-northeast is the village of Bijaipur. The whole surrounding area is basically flat farmland.

== Demographics ==
As of 2011, Sargawan had a population of 2,492, in 452 households. This population was 52.6% male (1,312) and 47.4% female (1,180). The 0–6 age group numbered 447 (232 male and 215 female), making up 17.9% of the total population. 451 residents were members of Scheduled Castes, or 18.9% of the total.

The 1981 census recorded Sargawan as having a population of 1,253 people (693 male and 560 female), in 212 households and 197 physical houses.

The 1961 census recorded Sargawan as comprising 3 hamlets, with a total population of 887 people (453 male and 434 female), in 380 households and 240 physical houses. The area of the village was given as 646 acres and it had a medical practitioner at that point.

== Infrastructure ==
As of 2011, Sargawan had 1 primary school; it did not have any healthcare facilities. Drinking water was provided by tap, hand pump, and tube well/bore well; there were no public toilets. The village had a public library but no post office or public library; there was at least some access to electricity for all purposes.
