= Mondha =

Village in Uttar Pradesh, India

- Village
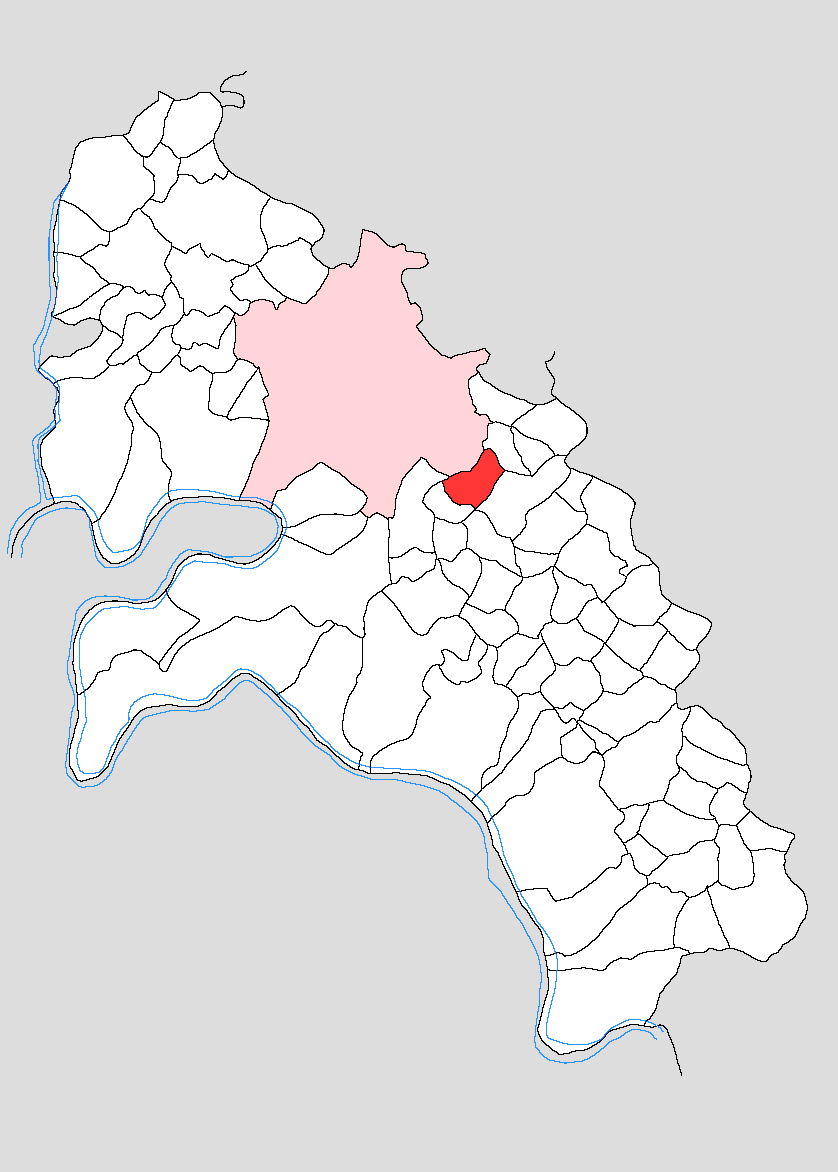
- Map showing Mondha in Firozabad block

- Location in Uttar Pradesh, India
- Coordinates: 27.13146°N 78.42872°E
- Country: India
- State: Uttar Pradesh
- District: Firozabad
- Tehsil: Firozabad

Area
  - Total: 1.581 km^{2} (0.610 sq mi)

Population (2011)
  - Total: 3,216
  - Density: 2,034/km^{2} (5,268/sq mi)
- Time zone: UTC+5:30 (IST)
- PIN: 283203

Mondha (Moṃḍhā) is a village in Firozabad block of Firozabad district, Uttar Pradesh. It is located just to the southeast of the city. As of 2011, it had a population of 3,216, in 555 households.

== Geography ==
Mondha is located a short distance southeast of Firozabad's urban area, with its main part just to the south of the main line of the Northern Railway. The old NH 2 passes by just to the north of the train tracks. The Firozabad Distributary canal also passes nearby, about 1 km west of Mondha in the area of Asafabad, and bends toward the southeast just south of Asafabad so that it also passes Mondha on the southwest, near the village of Ghazipur, about 1 km away. Other nearby villages include Rashidpur Kaneta, about 1 km to the southeast along the railway and highway; Jamalpur, about 1.5 km to the south by the canal; and Akalpur Damodarpur; about 2 km to the northeast.

== Demographics ==
As of 2011, Mondha had a population of 3,216, in 555 households. This population was 52.9% male (1,700) and 47.1% female (1,516). The 0–6 age group numbered 458 (239 male and 219 female), making up 14.2% of the total population. 983 residents were members of Scheduled Castes, or 30.6% of the total.

The 1981 census recorded Mondha (as "Monra" in English, but "मेंढा", Moṃḍhā, in Hindi) as having a population of 1,547 people (828 male and 719 female), in 242 households and 241 physical houses.

The 1961 census recorded Mondha as comprising 1 hamlet, with a total population of 921 people (486 male and 435 female), in 165 households and 125 physical houses. The area of the village was given as 350 acres.

== Infrastructure ==
As of 2011, Mondha had 2 primary schools; it did not have any healthcare facilities. Drinking water was provided by tap, hand pump, and tube well/bore well; there were no public toilets. The village did not have a post office or public library; there was at least some access to electricity for all purposes. Streets were made of both kachcha and pakka materials.
