= Gazipur (disambiguation) =

Gazipur may refer to several places:

- Gazipur, a city in Dhaka Division, Bangladesh
  - Gazipur District, Bangladesh, centered in the city
- Gazipur, Barisal Division, Bangladesh
- Gazipur, Chittagong Division, Bangladesh
- Gazipur, Jalandhar, village in Punjab, India
- Gazipur, Munger district, village in Bihar, India
- Gazipur, Nalanda district, village in Bihar, India

== See also ==
- Ghazipur (disambiguation)
- Battle of Gazipur, part of the 1971 Bangladesh Liberation War
