= Donkeli =

Village in Uttar Pradesh, India

- Village
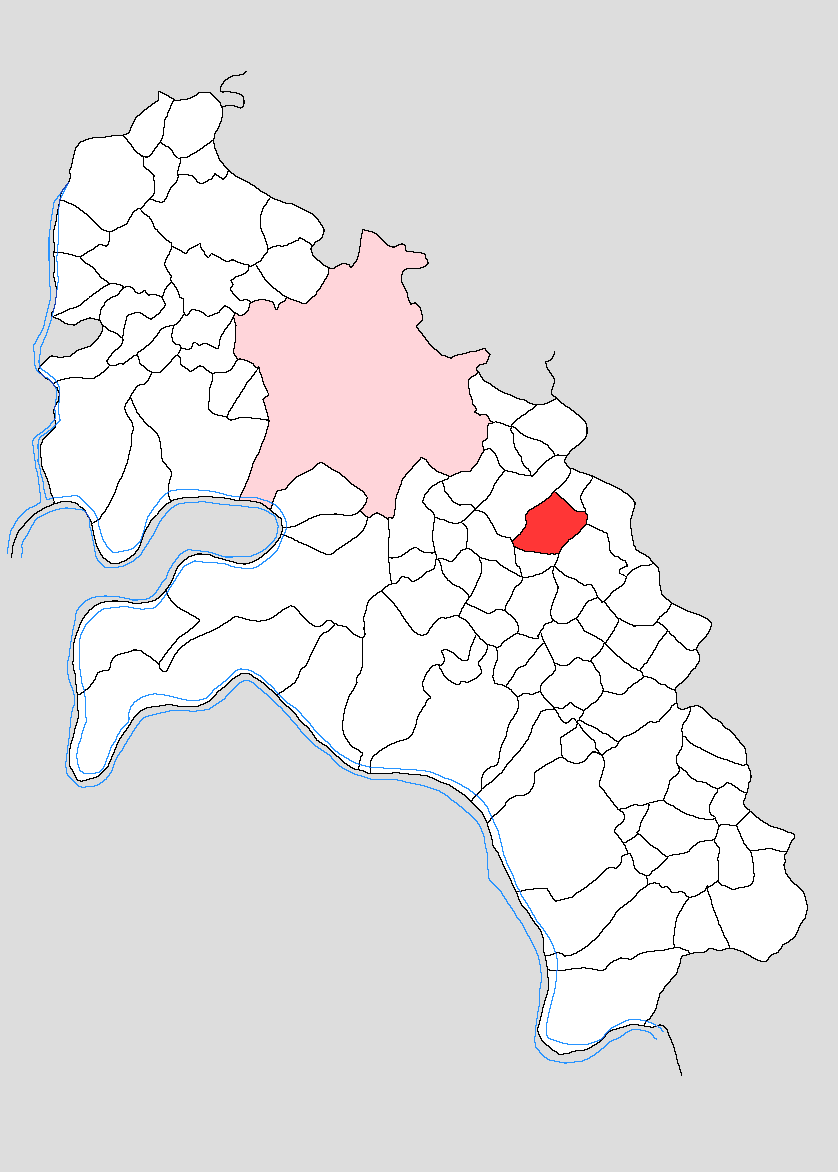
- Map showing Donkeli in Firozabad block

- Location in Uttar Pradesh, India
- Coordinates: 27.11601°N 78.44825°E
- Country: India
- State: Uttar Pradesh
- District: Firozabad
- Tehsil: Firozabad

Area
  - Total: 2.611 km^{2} (1.008 sq mi)

Population (2011)
  - Total: 6,494
  - Density: 2,487/km^{2} (6,442/sq mi)
- Time zone: UTC+5:30 (IST)
- PIN: 283203

Donkeli (Doṃkelī) is a village in Firozabad block of Firozabad district, Uttar Pradesh. It is located southeast of Firozabad. As of 2011, it had a population of 6,494, in 1,148 households.

== Geography ==
Donkeli is located southeast of Firozabad, south of the old NH 2 and the main line of the Northern Railway. The Firozabad Distributary canal passes by about 0.5 km due west of Donkeli, and there is a sharp 90° angle bend in the canal's course at that location. The area surrounding the village is basically all flat farmland. Nearby villages include Rashidpur Kaneta to the northwest, Jamalpur to the west, and Sargawan to the southeast.

== Demographics ==
As of 2011, Donkeli had a population of 6,494, in 1,148 households. This population was 53.0% male (3,445) and 47.0% female (3,049). The 0–6 age group numbered 1,050 (549 male and 501 female), making up 16.2% of the total population. 2,893 residents were members of Scheduled Castes, or 44.5% of the total.

The 1981 census recorded Donkeli as having a population of 2,552 people (1,396 male and 1,156 female), in 435 households and 436 [sic] physical houses.

The 1961 census recorded Donkeli as comprising 2 hamlets, with a total population of 1,666 people (846 male and 820 female), in 309 households and 243 physical houses. The area of the village was given as 646 acres and it had a post office and medical practitioner at that point.

== Infrastructure ==
As of 2011, Donkeli had 4 primary schools; it did not have any healthcare facilities. Drinking water was provided by tap, hand pump, and tube well/bore well; there were no public toilets. The village had a sub post office but no public library; there was at least some access to electricity for residential and agricultural (but not commercial) purposes. Streets were made of both kachcha and pakka materials.
