= Ghazipur (disambiguation) =

Ghazipur is a city and municipal corporation in the state of Uttar Pradesh, India.

Ghazipur may also refer to:

- Ghazipur (Lok Sabha constituency), Uttar Pradesh, India
- Ghazipur district, Uttar Pradesh, India
- Gazipur (Delhi), a village in Delhi, India
- Ghazipur, Firozabad, a village in Uttar Pradesh, India

== See also ==
- Gazipur (disambiguation)
- Ghaziabad (disambiguation)
