= Luhari, Firozabad =

Village in Uttar Pradesh, India

Luhari Lohari
- Village
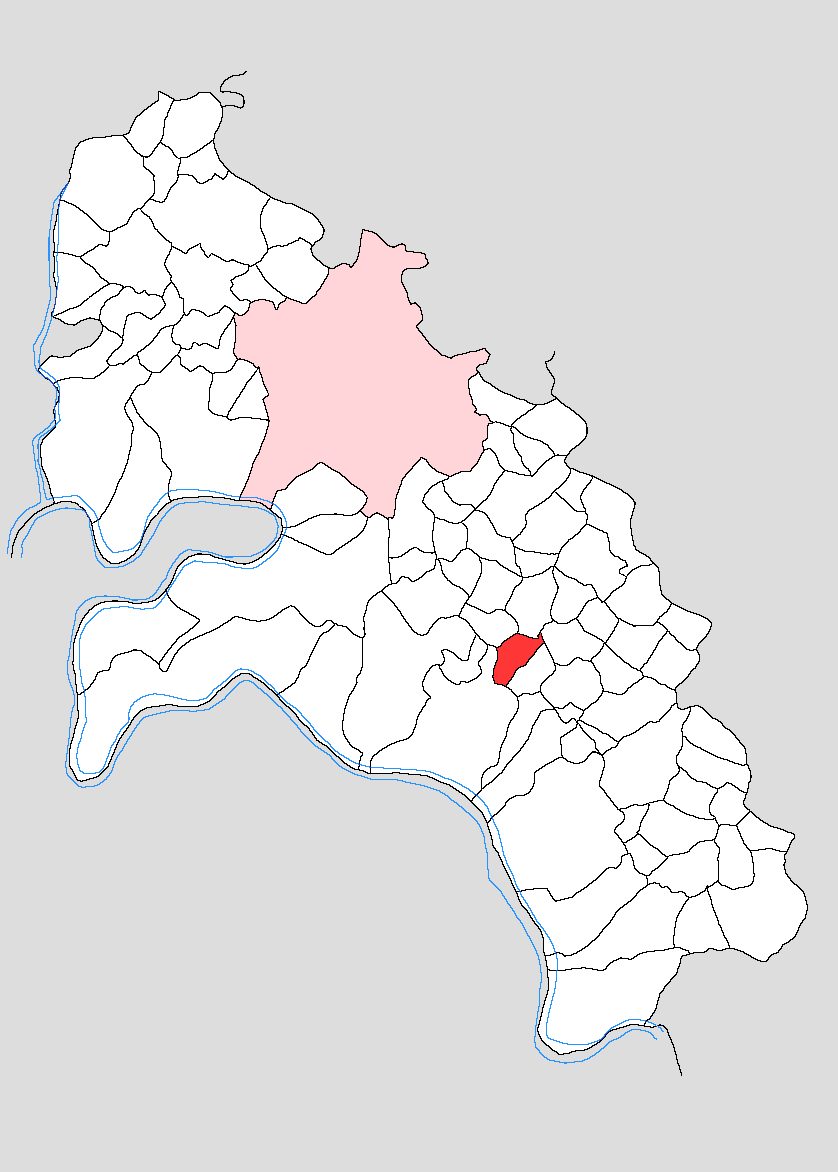
- Map showing Luhari in Firozabad block

- Location in Uttar Pradesh, India
- Coordinates: 27.08835°N 78.43843°E
- Country: India
- State: Uttar Pradesh
- District: Firozabad
- Tehsil: Firozabad

Area
  - Total: 1.266 km^{2} (0.489 sq mi)

Population (2011)
  - Total: 872
  - Density: 689/km^{2} (1,780/sq mi)
- Time zone: UTC+5:30 (IST)
- PIN: 283203

Luhari (Luhārī), also spelled Lohari, is a village in Firozabad block of Firozabad district, Uttar Pradesh. It is located southeast of Firozabad. As of 2011, it had a population of 872, in 148 households.

== Geography ==
Luhari is located southeast of Firozabad and is surrounded by level farmland. Nearby villages include Fatehpur Anandipur to the northwest, Nurpur Kutubpur to the west, Anandipur Karkauli to the southwest, Salempur Anandipur to the southeast, Matamai to the east, and Ladupur Chakarpur to the northeast.

== Demographics ==
As of 2011, Luhari had a population of 872, in 148 households. This population was 55.6% male (485) and 44.4% female (387). The 0–6 age group numbered 128 (58 male and 70 female), making up 14.7% of the total population. 58 residents were members of Scheduled Castes, or 6.7% of the total.

The 1981 census recorded Luhari as having a population of 634 people (350 male and 284 female), in 79 households and 79 physical houses.

The 1961 census recorded Luhari as comprising 1 hamlet, with a total population of 447 people (255 male and 192 female), in 74 households and 54 physical houses. The area of the village was given as 313 acres.

== Infrastructure ==
As of 2011, Luhari had 1 primary school; it did not have any healthcare facilities. Drinking water was provided by tap, hand pump, and tube well/bore well; there were no public toilets. The village did not have a post office or public library; there was at least some access to electricity for residential and agricultural (but not commercial) purposes. Streets were made of both kachcha and pakka materials.
