= Rashidpur Kaneta =

Village in Uttar Pradesh, India

- Village
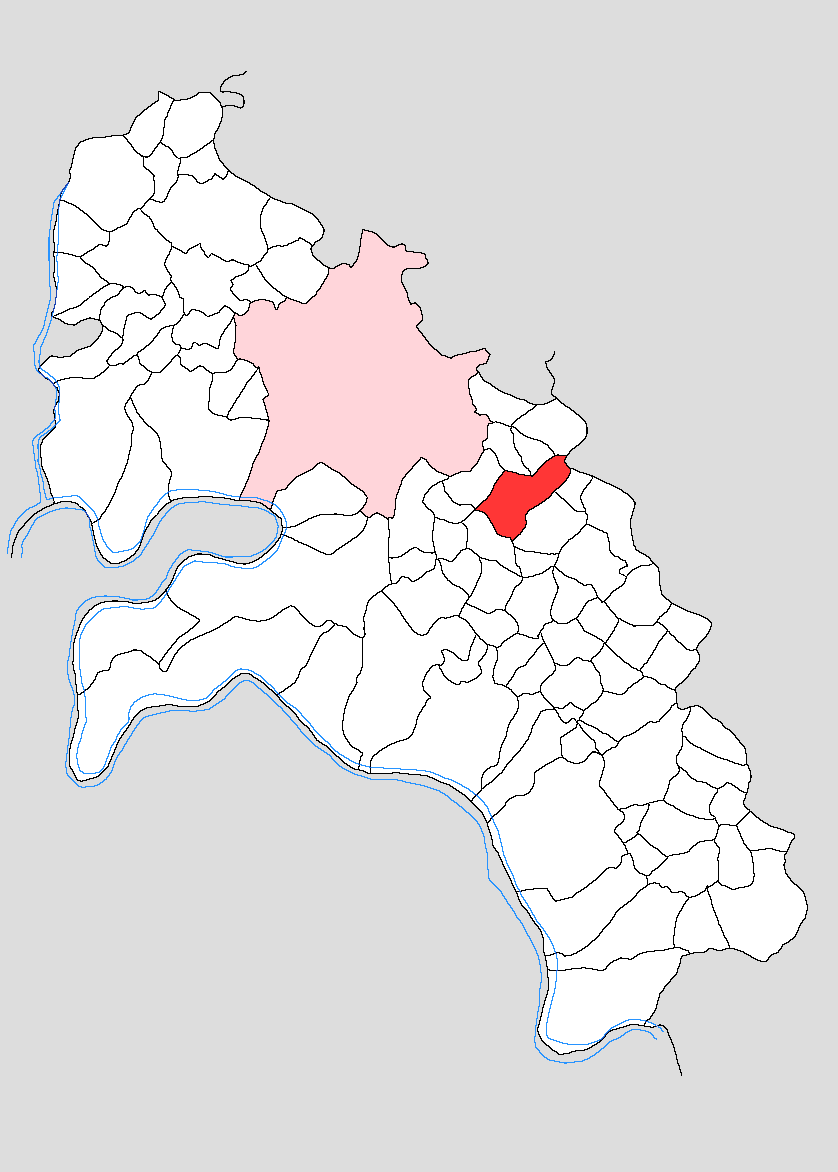
- Map showing Rashidpur Kaneta in Firozabad block

- Location in Uttar Pradesh, India
- Coordinates: 27.12972°N 78.44015°E
- Country: India
- State: Uttar Pradesh
- District: Firozabad
- Tehsil: Firozabad

Area
  - Total: 2.900 km^{2} (1.120 sq mi)

Population (2011)
  - Total: 2,731
  - Density: 941.7/km^{2} (2,439/sq mi)
- Time zone: UTC+5:30 (IST)
- PIN: 283203

Rashidpur Kaneta (Raśīdpur Kaneṭā) is a village in Firozabad block of Firozabad district, Uttar Pradesh. It is located south-southeast from Firozabad along the highway, about halfway to the town of Makkhanpur. As of 2011, it had a population of 2,731, in 465 households.

== Geography ==
Rashidpur Kaneta is located south-southeast of Firozabad on the old NH 2, about halfway to the town of Makkhanpur to the east. The village is mainly in the narrow area between the highway and the main line of the Northern Railway, which run parallel with each other about 150 m apart. To the west is the village of Mondha, which is south of the railway tracks and close to Firozabad's city limits. To the southwest is Jamalpur, to the southeast is Donkeli, and to the north are Akalpur Damodarpur and Alampur Kaneta. The Firozabad district headquarters is located a bit to the east along the highway.

== Demographics ==
As of 2011, Rashidpur Kaneta had a population of 2,731, in 465 households. This population was 53.2% male (1,453) and 46.8% female (1,278). The 0–6 age group numbered 403 (207 male and 196 female), making up 14.8% of the total population. 751 residents were members of Scheduled Castes, or 27.% of the total.

The 1981 census recorded Rashidpur Kaneta (as "Rasidpur Kaneta") as having a population of 1,257 people (701 male and 556 female), in 223 households and 215 physical houses.

The 1961 census recorded Rashidpur Kaneta as comprising 2 hamlets, with a total population of 889 people (461 male and 428 female), in 148 households and 124 physical houses. The area of the village was given as 416 acres.

== Infrastructure ==
As of 2011, Rashidpur Kaneta had 2 primary schools; it did not have any healthcare facilities. Drinking water was provided by tap, hand pump, and tube well/bore well; there were no public toilets. The village did not have a post office or public library; there was at least some access to electricity for residential and agricultural (but not commercial) purposes. Streets were made of both kachcha and pakka materials.
