= Paharpur, Firozabad =

Village in Uttar Pradesh, India

Paharpur
- Village
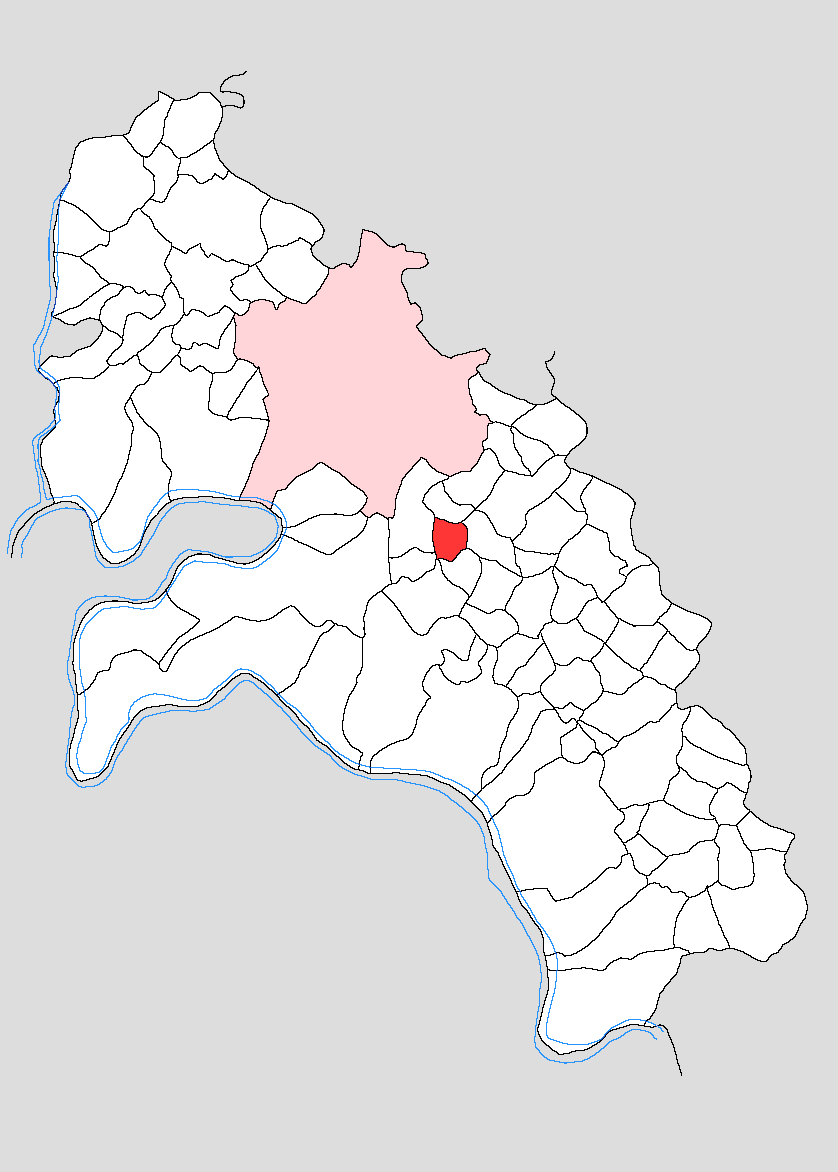
- Map showing Paharpur in Firozabad block

- Location in Uttar Pradesh, India
- Coordinates: 27.11646°N 78.42173°E
- Country: India
- State: Uttar Pradesh
- District: Firozabad
- Tehsil: Firozabad

Area
  - Total: 1.060 km^{2} (0.409 sq mi)

Population (2011)
  - Total: 3,782
  - Density: 3,568/km^{2} (9,241/sq mi)
- Time zone: UTC+5:30 (IST)

Paharpur (Pahāṛpur) is a village in Firozabad block of Firozabad district, Uttar Pradesh. As of 2011, it had a population of 3,782, in 587 households.

== Geography ==
Paharpur is located southeast of Firozabad and is surrounded entirely by farmland. The hamlet of Nagla Udi is just to the north-northwest of Paharpur; surrounding villages include Ghazipur to the north, Jamalpur to the northeast, Jhengarpur and Balchandpur to the southeast, Bilahna to the south, Nasirpur to the southwest, and Barkatpur to the northwest.

== Demographics ==
As of 2011, Paharpur had a population of 3,782, in 587 households. This population was 52.2% male (1,976) and 47.8% female (1,806). The 0–6 age group numbered 658 (336 male and 322 female), making up 17.4% of the total population. No residents were members of Scheduled Castes.

The 1981 census recorded Paharpur as having a population of 1,617 people (893 male and 724 female), in 220 households and 220 physical houses.

The 1961 census recorded Paharpur as comprising 2 hamlets, with a total population of 935 people (501 male and 434 female), in 159 households and 125 physical houses. The area of the village was given as 238 acres.

== Infrastructure ==
As of 2011, Paharpur had 1 primary school; it did not have any healthcare facilities. Drinking water was provided by tap and hand pumpl; there were no public toilets. The village did not have a post office or public library; there was at least some access to electricity for all purposes. Streets were made of both kachcha and pakka materials.
