= Ghaziabad (disambiguation) =

Ghaziabad is a city in Uttar Pradesh, India.

Ghaziabad may also refer to:

- Ghaziabad Municipal Corporation, the civic body that governs the city of Ghaziabad
- Ghaziabad district, a district in Uttar Pradesh, India containing the city of Ghaziabad
- Ghaziabad Junction railway station
- Ghaziabad Assembly constituency
- Ghaziabad Lok Sabha constituency
- Ghaziabad, Karachi, a neighborhood of Karachi, Sindh, Pakistan
- Ghaziabad District, Kunar, situated in the northern part of Kunar Province, Afghanistan
  - Ghaziabad Airport

== See also ==
- Ghazipur (disambiguation)
