= Fatehpur Anandipur =

Village in Uttar Pradesh, India

- Village
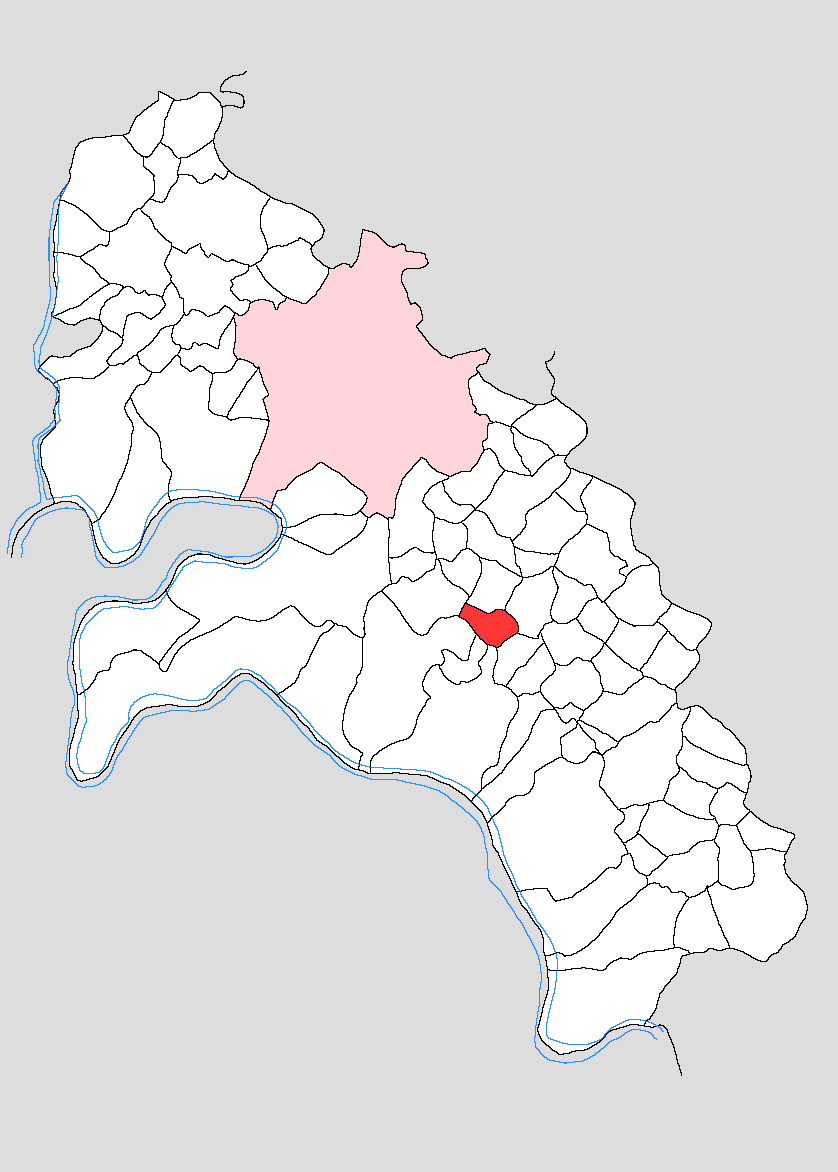
- Map showing Fatehpur Anandipur in Firozabad block

- Location in Uttar Pradesh, India
- Coordinates: 27.0960°N 78.43349°E
- Country: India
- State: Uttar Pradesh
- District: Firozabad
- Tehsil: Firozabad

Area
  - Total: 1.240 km^{2} (0.479 sq mi)

Population (2011)
  - Total: 542
  - Density: 437/km^{2} (1,130/sq mi)
- Time zone: UTC+5:30 (IST)

Fatehpur Anandipur (Fatehpur Ānandīpur) is a village in Firozabad block of Firozabad district, Uttar Pradesh. It is located southeast of Firozabad, at the southern end of the Firozabad Distributary canal. As of 2011, it had a population of 542, in 103 households.

== Geography ==
Fatehpur Anandipur is located southeast of Firozabad, at the southern end of the Firozabad Distributary canal. Nearby villages include Bilahna to the northwest, Jahangirpur and Balchandpur to the north, Ladupur Chakarpur to the northeast, Luhari to the southeast, and Nurpur Kutubpur to the southwest.

== Demographics ==
As of 2011, Fatehpur Anandipur had a population of 542, in 103 households. This population was 53.5% male (290) and 46.5% female (252). The 0–6 age group numbered 70 (37 male and 33 female), making up 12.9% of the total population. No residents were members of Scheduled Castes.

The 1981 census recorded Fatehpur Anandipur as having a population of 460 people (230 male and 230 female), in 63 households and 63 physical houses.

The 1961 census recorded Fatehpur Anandipur as comprising 1 hamlet, with a total population of 266 people (148 male and 118 female), in 40 households and 31 physical houses. The area of the village was given as 337 acres.

== Infrastructure ==
As of 2011, Fatehpur Anandipur did not have any schools or healthcare facilities. No means of drinking water access was listed, and there were no public toilets. The village did not have a post office or public library; there was at least some access to electricity for all purposes.
