= Barkatpur =

Village in Uttar Pradesh, India

- Village
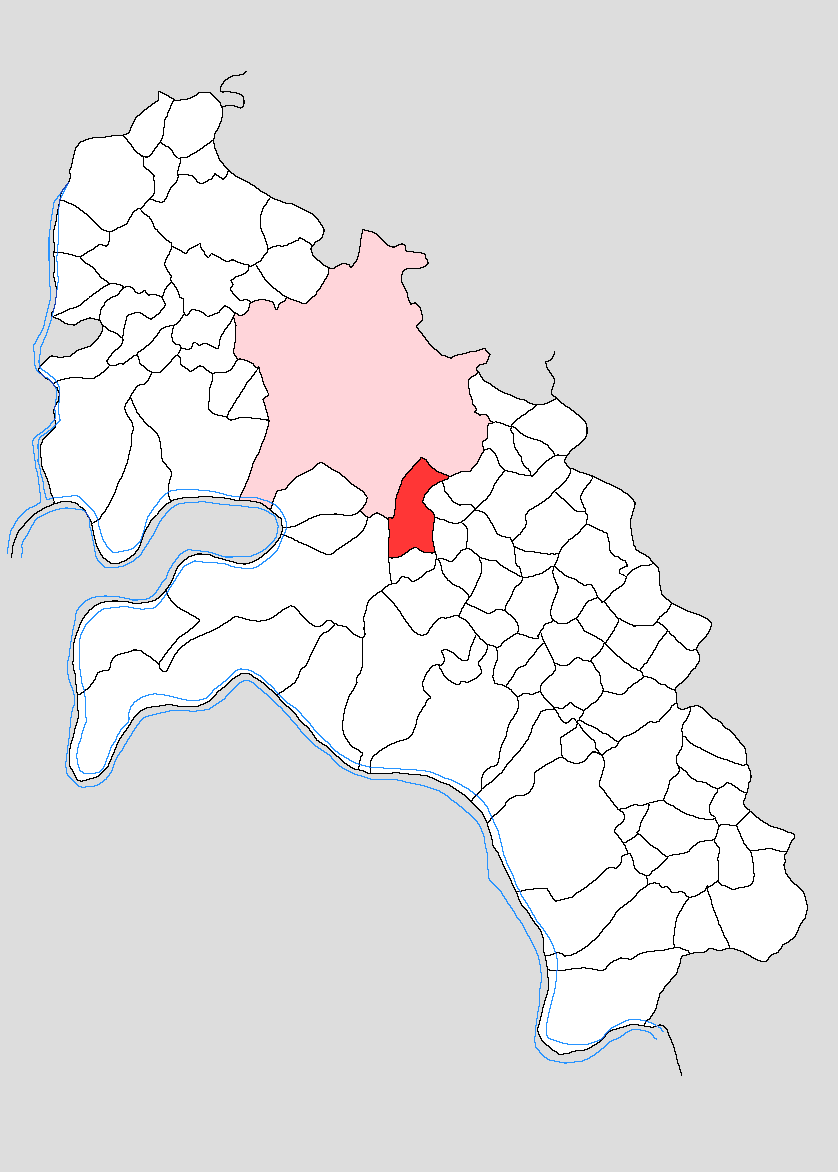
- Map showing Barkatpur in Firozabad block

- Location in Uttar Pradesh, India
- Coordinates: 27.11753°N 78.40971°E
- Country: India
- State: Uttar Pradesh
- District: Firozabad
- Tehsil: Firozabad

Area
  - Total: 2.936 km^{2} (1.134 sq mi)

Population (2011)
  - Total: 8,145
  - Density: 2,774/km^{2} (7,185/sq mi)
- Time zone: UTC+5:30 (IST)

Barkatpur (Barkatpur) is a village in Firozabad block of Firozabad district, Uttar Pradesh. As of 2011, it had a population of 8,145, in 1,306 households.

== Geography ==
Barkatpur is located south of Firozabad, and a bit to the east of a small stream called the Ganda Nala. The village of Nasirpur is just south of Barkatpur, and Paharpur is a bit to the southeast.

== Demographics ==
As of 2011, Barkatpur had a population of 8,145, in 1,306 households. This population was 53.4% male (4,353) and 46.6% female (3,792). The 0–6 age group numbered 1,527 (781 male and 746 female), making up 18.7% of the total population. 708 residents were members of Scheduled Castes, or 8.7% of the total.

The 1981 census recorded Barkatpur as having a population of 2,256 people (1,211 male and 1,045 female), in 350 households and 350 physical houses.

The 1961 census recorded Barkatpur as comprising 2 hamlets, with a total population of 1,062 people (542 male and 520 female), in 134 households and 121 physical houses. The area of the village was given as 679 acres.

== Infrastructure ==
As of 2011, Barkatpur had 3 primary schools; it did not have any healthcare facilities. Drinking water was provided by hand pump; there were no public toilets. The village did not have a post office or public library; there was at least some access to electricity for all purposes. Streets were made of both kachcha and pakka materials.
