= Salempur Anandipur =

Village in Uttar Pradesh, India

- Village
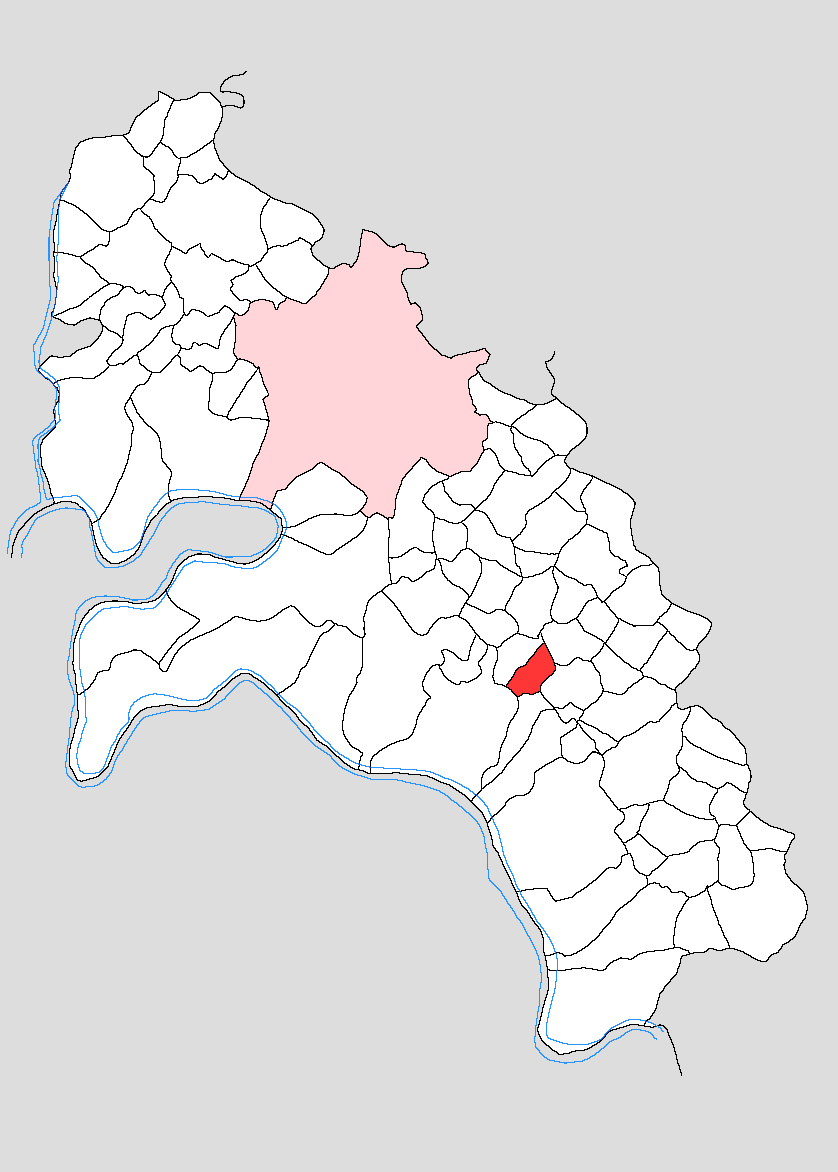
- Map showing Salempur Anandipur in Firozabad block

- Location in Uttar Pradesh, India
- Coordinates: 27.08312°N 78.44313°E
- Country: India
- State: Uttar Pradesh
- District: Firozabad
- Tehsil: Firozabad

Area
  - Total: 1.286 km^{2} (0.497 sq mi)

Population (2011)
  - Total: 355
  - Density: 276/km^{2} (715/sq mi)
- Time zone: UTC+5:30 (IST)
- PIN: 283203

Salempur Anandipur (Salempur Ānandīpur) is a small village in Firozabad block of Firozabad district, Uttar Pradesh. It is located southeast of Firozabad. As of 2011, it had a population of 355, in 58 households.

== Geography ==
Salempur Anandipur is located southeast of Firozabad and is surrounded by level farmland. Nearby villages include Luhari to the northwest, Matamai to the northeast, Phulaichi and Kindarpur to the southeast, and Anandipur Karkauli to the southwest.

== Demographics ==
As of 2011, Salempur Anandipur had a population of 355, in 58 households. This population was 57.2% male (203) and 42.8% female (152). The 0–6 age group numbered 54 (31 male and 23 female), making up 15.2% of the total population. 54 residents were members of Scheduled Castes, or 15.2% of the total.

The 1981 census recorded Salempur Anandipur as having a population of 211 people (123 male and 88 female), in 32 households and 32 physical houses.

The 1961 census recorded Salempur Anandipur as comprising 1 hamlet, with a total population of 147 people (88 male and 59 female), in 30 households and 27 physical houses. The area of the village was given as 318 acres.

== Infrastructure ==
As of 2011, Salempur Anandipur had 1 primary school; it did not have any healthcare facilities. Drinking water was provided by hand pump and tube well/bore well; there were no public toilets. The village did not have a post office or public library; there was at least some access to electricity for residential and agricultural (but not commercial) purposes. Streets were made of both kachcha and pakka materials.
