= Sherpur Anandipur =

Village in Uttar Pradesh, India

- Village
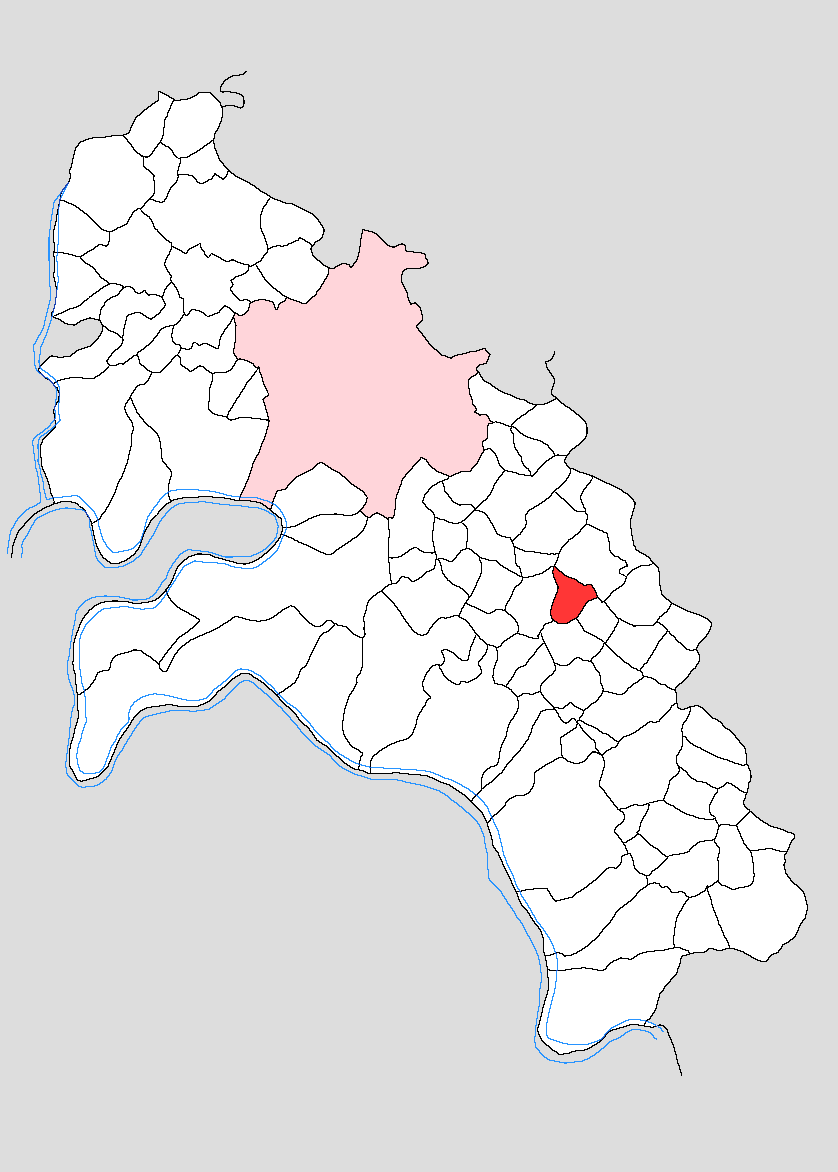
- Map showing Sherpur Anandipur in Firozabad block

- Location in Uttar Pradesh, India
- Coordinates: 27.09909°N 78.45409°E
- Country: India
- State: Uttar Pradesh
- District: Firozabad
- Tehsil: Firozabad

Area
  - Total: 1.275 km^{2} (0.492 sq mi)

Population (2011)
  - Total: 254
  - Density: 199/km^{2} (516/sq mi)
- Time zone: UTC+5:30 (IST)

Sherpur Anandipur (Śerpur Ānandīpur) is a small village in Firozabad block of Firozabad district, Uttar Pradesh. It is located southeast of Firozabad. As of 2011, it had a population of 254, in 35 households.

== Geography ==
Sherpur Anandipur is located southeast of Firozabad and is surrounded by level farmland on all sides. Nearby villages include Ladupur Chakarpur to the northwest, Kharsoli to the southeast, and Matamai due south. The hamlet of Nagla Datu is located to the northeast.

== Demographics ==
As of 2011, Sherpur Anandipur had a population of 254, in 35 households. This population was 52.0% male (132) and 48.0% female (122). The 0–6 age group numbered 63 (30 male and 33 female), making up 24.8% of the total population. No residents were members of Scheduled Castes.

The 1981 census recorded Sherpur Anandipur as having a population of 135 people (74 male and 61 female), in 18 households and 18 physical houses.

The 1961 census recorded Sherpur Anandipur as comprising 1 hamlet, with a total population of 76 people (38 male and 38 female), in 14 households and 10 physical houses. The area of the village was given as 315 acres.

== Infrastructure ==
As of 2011, Sherpur Anandipur had 1 primary school; it did not have any healthcare facilities. Drinking water was provided by hand pump; there were no public toilets. The village did not have a post office or public library; there was at least some access to electricity for all purposes. Streets were made of both kachcha and pakka materials.
