= Baramai =

Village in Uttar Pradesh, India

- Village
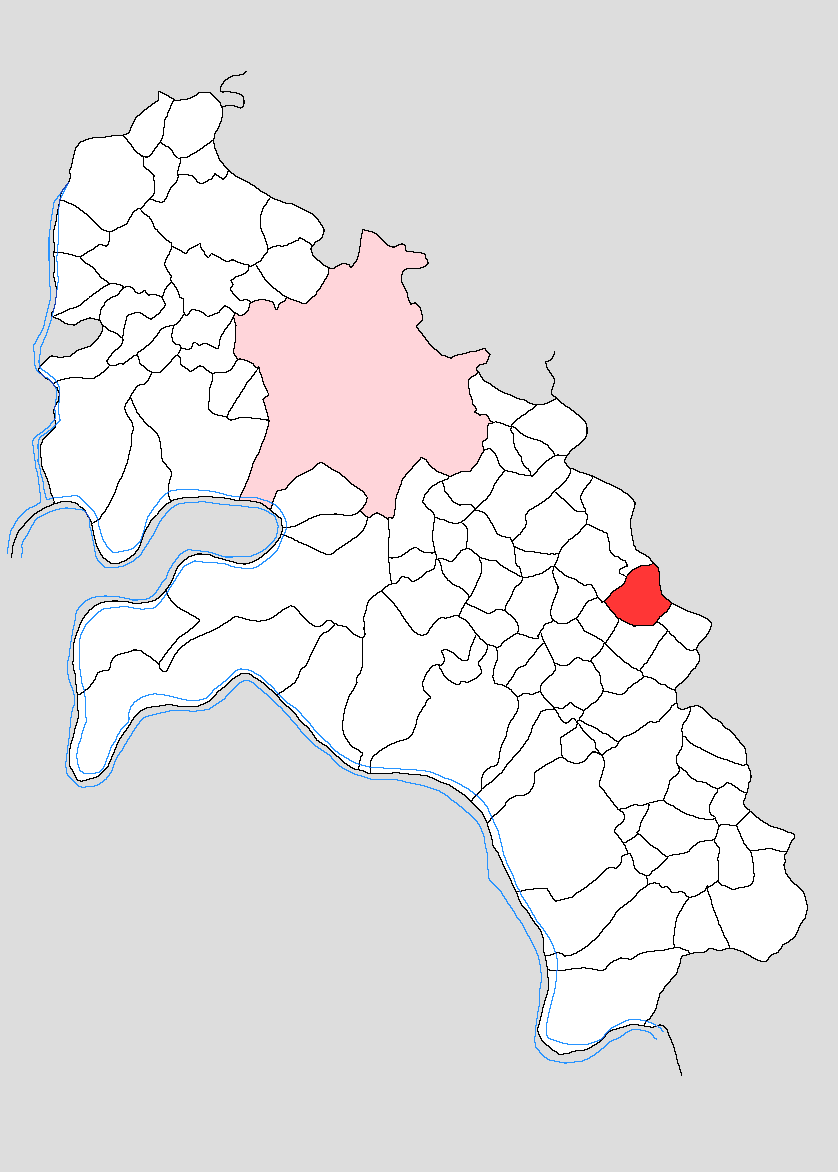
- Map showing Baramai in Firozabad block

- Location in Uttar Pradesh, India
- Coordinates: 27.10496°N 78.47417°E
- Country: India
- State: Uttar Pradesh
- District: Firozabad
- Tehsil: Firozabad

Area
  - Total: 2.108 km^{2} (0.814 sq mi)

Population (2011)
  - Total: 1,238
  - Density: 587.3/km^{2} (1,521/sq mi)
- Time zone: UTC+5:30 (IST)

Baramai (Bāṛāmaī) is a village in Firozabad block of Firozabad district, Uttar Pradesh. It is located southeast of Firozabad, close to the town of Makkhanpur to the northeast. As of 2011, it had a population of 1,238, in 218 households.

== Geography ==
Baramai is located southeast of Firozabad, close to the tehsil boundary with Shikohabad. The town of Makkhanpur is about 2 km to the northeast. The hamlet of Nagla Daru is located a short distance to the west of Baramai, while to the northwest are the close-together Nagla Kharagjit and Nagla Bhaosingh. Farther away to the south is the hamlet of Natpura, and to the southwest is the village of Kharsoli.

== Demographics ==
As of 2011, Baramai had a population of 1,238, in 218 households. This population was 53.8% male (666) and 46.2% female (572). The 0–6 age group numbered 224 (126 male and 98 female), making up 18.1% of the total population. 274 residents were members of Scheduled Castes, or 22.1% of the total.

The 1981 census recorded Baramai as having a population of 600 people (321 male and 279 female), in 102 households and 102 physical houses.

The 1961 census recorded Baramai as comprising 1 hamlet, with a total population of 377 people (202 male and 175 female), in 47 households and 45 physical houses. The area of the village was given as 521 acres.

== Infrastructure ==
As of 2011, Baramai had 1 primary school; it did not have any healthcare facilities. Drinking water was provided by tap, hand pump, and tube well/bore well; there were no public toilets. The village did not have a post office or public library; there was at least some access to electricity for residential and agricultural (but not commercial) purposes. Streets were made of both kachcha and pakka materials.
