= Ghazipur, Firozabad =

Village in Uttar Pradesh, India

Ghazipur
- Village
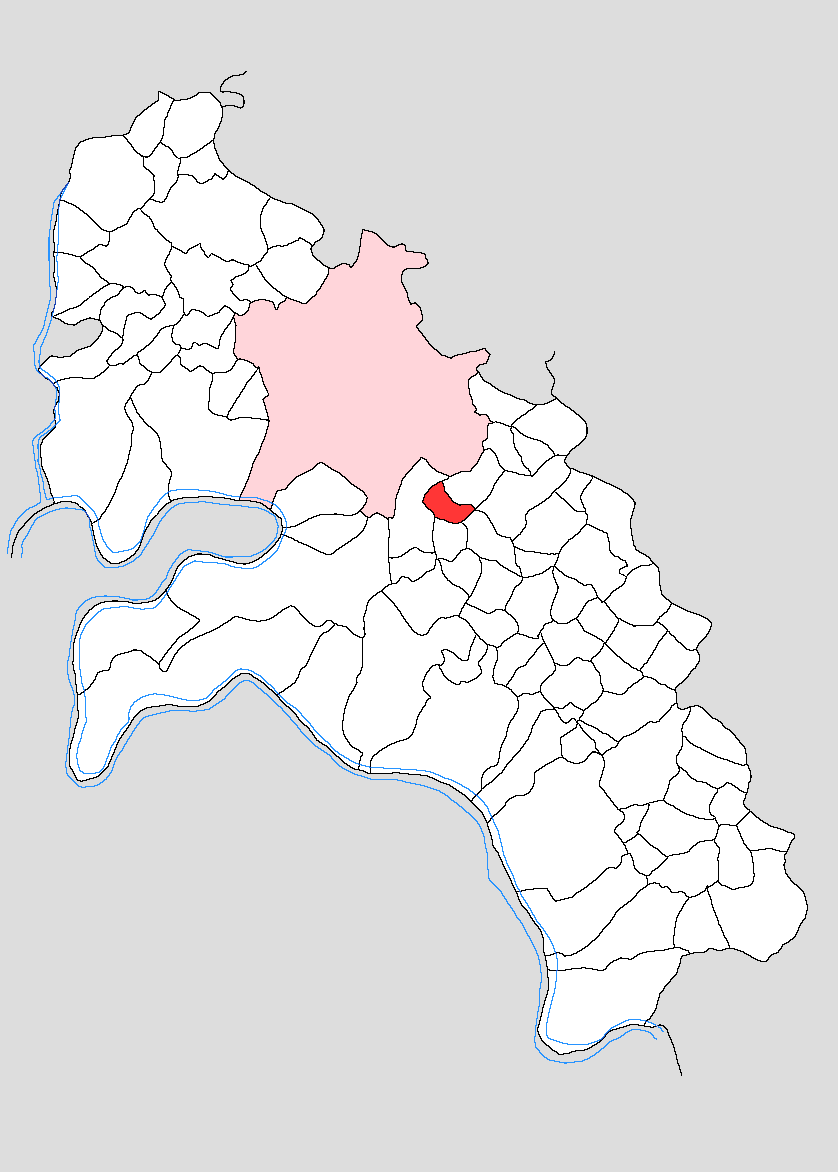
- Map showing Ghazipur in Firozabad block

- Location in Uttar Pradesh, India
- Coordinates: 27.12506°N 78.42101°E
- Country: India
- State: Uttar Pradesh
- District: Firozabad
- Tehsil: Firozabad

Area
  - Total: 0.952 km^{2} (0.368 sq mi)

Population (2011)
  - Total: 1,697
  - Density: 1,780/km^{2} (4,620/sq mi)
- Time zone: UTC+5:30 (IST)

Ghazipur (Ghāzīpur) is a village in Firozabad block of Firozabad district, Uttar Pradesh. It is located just to the southeast of Firozabad. As of 2011, it had a population of 1,697, in 304 households.

== Geography ==
Ghazipur is located just southeast of Firozabad, along a rural road heading southeast toward Jamalpur and then Balchandpur. The Firozabad Distributary canal is located just to the east of Ghazipur. Other than that, the surrounding area is basically all level farmland.

== Demographics ==
As of 2011, Ghazipur had a population of 1,697, in 304 households. This population was 52.0% male (883) and 48.0% female (814). The 0–6 age group numbered 269 (140 male and 129 female), making up 15.9% of the total population. 207 residents were members of Scheduled Castes, or 12.2% of the total.

The 1981 census recorded Ghazipur (as "Gazipur") as having a population of 775 people (418 male and 357 female), in 104 households and 100 physical houses.

The 1961 census recorded Ghazipur as comprising 1 hamlet, with a total population of 530 people (302 male and 228 female), in 86 households and 73 physical houses. The area of the village was given as 238 acres.

== Infrastructure ==
As of 2011, Ghazipur had 2 primary schools; it did not have any healthcare facilities. Drinking water was provided by hand pump; there were no public toilets. The village did not have a post office or public library; there was at least some access to electricity for all purposes. Streets were made of both kachcha and pakka materials.
