= Bijaipur Nagla Bhaosingh =

Village in Uttar Pradesh, India

Bijaipur Nagla Bhaosingh Vijaypur, Nagla Bhavesingh
- Village
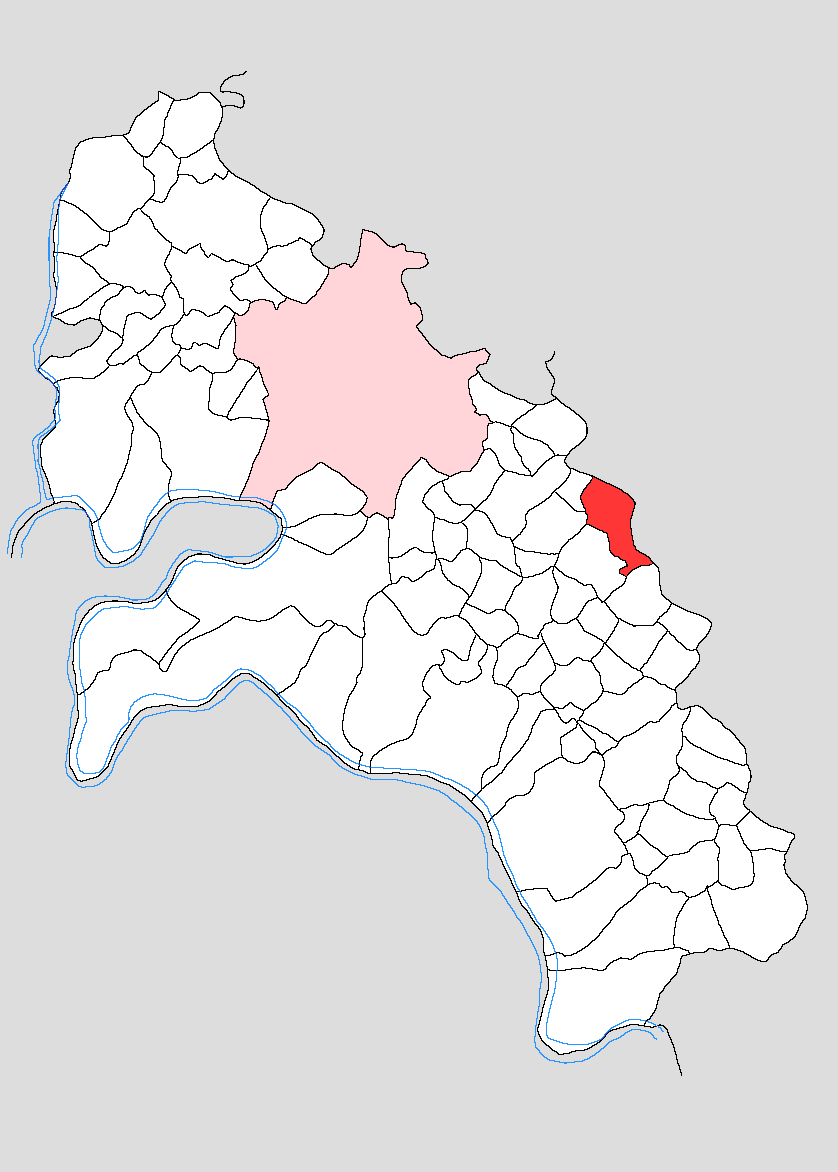
- Map showing Bijaipur Nagla Bhaosingh in Firozabad block

- Location in Uttar Pradesh, India
- Coordinates: 27.1220°N 78.4600°E
- Country: India
- State: Uttar Pradesh
- District: Firozabad
- Tehsil: Firozabad

Area
  - Total: 2.514 km^{2} (0.971 sq mi)

Population (2011)
  - Total: 5,074
  - Density: 2,018/km^{2} (5,227/sq mi)
- Time zone: UTC+5:30 (IST)

Bijaipur Nagla Bhaosingh (Bijaypur Naglā Bhāvsiṅgh) is a village in Firozabad block of Firozabad district, Uttar Pradesh. It technically consists of two separate settlements, Bijaipur (also spelled Vijaypur) and Nagla Bhaosingh (also spelled Nagla Bhavesingh), which are administered together as a single gram panchayat. As of 2011, it had a population of 5,074, in 840 households.

== Geography ==
Bijaipur and Nagla Bhaosingh are the names of two separate settlements, located within a kilometre of each other. Bijaipur is located to the northwest, directly on the north side of the Northern Railway's main line. Nagla Bhaosingh is located to the southeast, directly adjoining the settlement of Nagla Kharagjit to the east. The village of Sargawan is actually somewhat closer to Nagla Bhaosingh than Bijaipur is; Sargawan is west of Nagla Bhaosingh and south-southwest of Bijaipur. The old NH 2 passes by Bijaipur on the north, connecting Firozabad to the northwest with the town of Makkhanpur to the east. Makkhanpur is closer to Bijaipur and Nagla Bhaosingh than Firozabad is; it is actually the closest settlement (whether urban or rural) to both sites. It is east of Bijaipur and northeast of Nagla Bhaosingh. The tehsil boundary is just east of Bijaipur and Nagla Bhaosingh..

== Demographics ==
As of 2011, Bijaipur Nagla Bhaosingh had a population of 5,074, in 840 households. This population was 53.9% male (2,736) and 46.1% female (2,338). The 0–6 age group numbered 717 (404 male and 313 female), making up 14.1% of the total population. 1,298 residents were members of Scheduled Castes, or 25.6% of the total.

The 1981 census recorded Bijaipur Nagla Bhaosingh (as "Bijaypur Nagla Bhausingh") as having a population of 2,265 people (1,231 male and 1,034 female), in 276 households and 275 physical houses.

The 1961 census recorded Bijaipur Nagla Bhaosingh as comprising 2 hamlets, with a total population of 1,345 people (720 male and 625 female), in 170 households and 110 physical houses. The area of the village was given as 625 acres.

== Infrastructure ==
As of 2011, Bijaipur Nagla Bhaosingh had 3 primary schools; it did not have any healthcare facilities. Drinking water was provided by tap, hand pump, and tube well/bore well; there were no public toilets. The village did not have a post office or public library; there was at least some access to electricity for residential and agricultural (but not commercial) purposes. Streets were made of both kachcha and pakka materials.
