= Ladupur Chakarpur =

Village in Uttar Pradesh, India

- Village
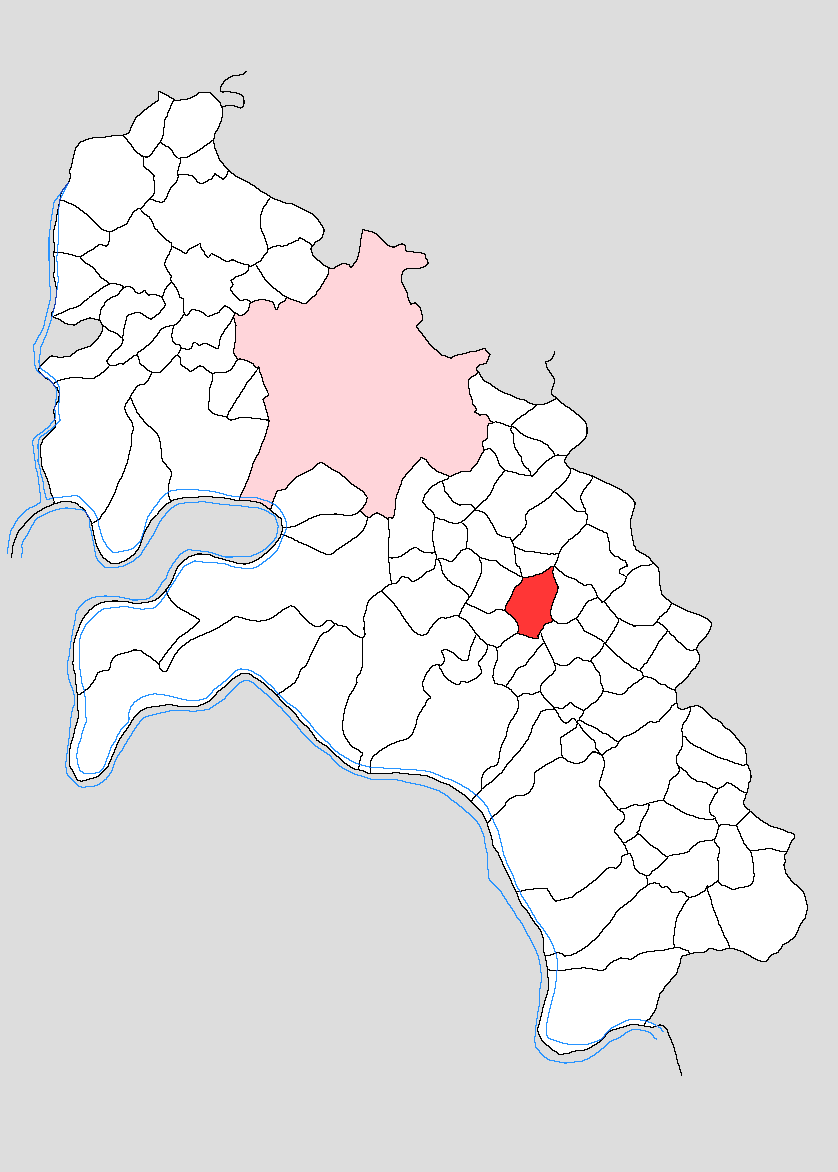
- Map showing Ladupur Chakarpur in Firozabad block

- Location in Uttar Pradesh, India
- Coordinates: 27.10448°N 78.43500°E
- Country: India
- State: Uttar Pradesh
- District: Firozabad
- Tehsil: Firozabad

Area
  - Total: 1.726 km^{2} (0.666 sq mi)

Population (2011)
  - Total: 1,396
  - Density: 808.8/km^{2} (2,095/sq mi)
- Time zone: UTC+5:30 (IST)

Ladupur Chakarpur is a village in Firozabad block of Firozabad district, Uttar Pradesh. It technically consists of two separate settlements, Ladupur and Chakarpur, which are right next to each other and are administered as a single gram panchayat. As of 2011, it had a population of 1,396, in 221 households.

== Geography ==
Ladupur and Chakarpur are the names of two separate settlements that are almost contiguous, with Ladupur to the southeast and Chakarpur slightly to the northwest. A rural district road runs through both, coming from Firozabad in the northwest and passing through toward the southeast. Immediately northwest of Ladupur Chakarpur on this road is the village of Balchandpur, while the next village to the southeast is Matamai. The village of Nagla Mullah is located a short distance to the north of Ladupur Chakarpur, while Sherpur Anandipur is to the east, and to the south is the hamlet of Garhia. The surrounding terrain is almost completely flat and is mostly farmland. The Firozabad Distributary canal passes by the village on the west; the canal's south end is nearby to the southwest, near the village of Fatehpur Anandipur.

== Demographics ==
As of 2011, Ladupur Chakarpur had a population of 1,396, in 221 households. This population was 55.3% male (772) and 44.7% female (624). The 0–6 age group numbered 226 (125 male and 101 female), making up 16.2% of the total population. 538 residents were members of Scheduled Castes, or 38.5% of the total.

The 1981 census recorded Ladupur Chakarpur (as "Lathupur Chakarpur") as having a population of 851 people (487 male and 364 female), in 152 households and 152 physical houses.

The 1961 census recorded Ladupur Chakarpur (as "Ladhupur Chakarpur") as comprising 2 hamlets, with a total population of 653 people (360 male and 293 female), in 98 households and 75 physical houses. The area of the village was given as 427 acres and it had a medical practitioner at that point.

== Infrastructure ==
As of 2011, Ladupur Chakarpur had 1 primary school; it did not have any healthcare facilities. Drinking water was provided by hand pump; there were no public toilets. The village did not have a post office or public library; there was at least some access to electricity for all purposes. Streets were made of both kachcha and pakka materials.
