= Gazipur, Jalandhar =

Gazipur
- village
- Location in Punjab, India Gazipur (India)
- Coordinates: 31°19′29″N 75°28′39″E
- Country: India
- State: Punjab
- District: Jalandhar

Population (2011)
  - Total: 838

Languages
  - Official: Punjabi
  - Regional: Punjabi
- Time zone: UTC+5:30 (IST)

Gazipur is a village located in the Jalandhar district of Punjab, India. The total population of the village is about 838.
