= Balchandpur =

Village in Uttar Pradesh, India

- Village
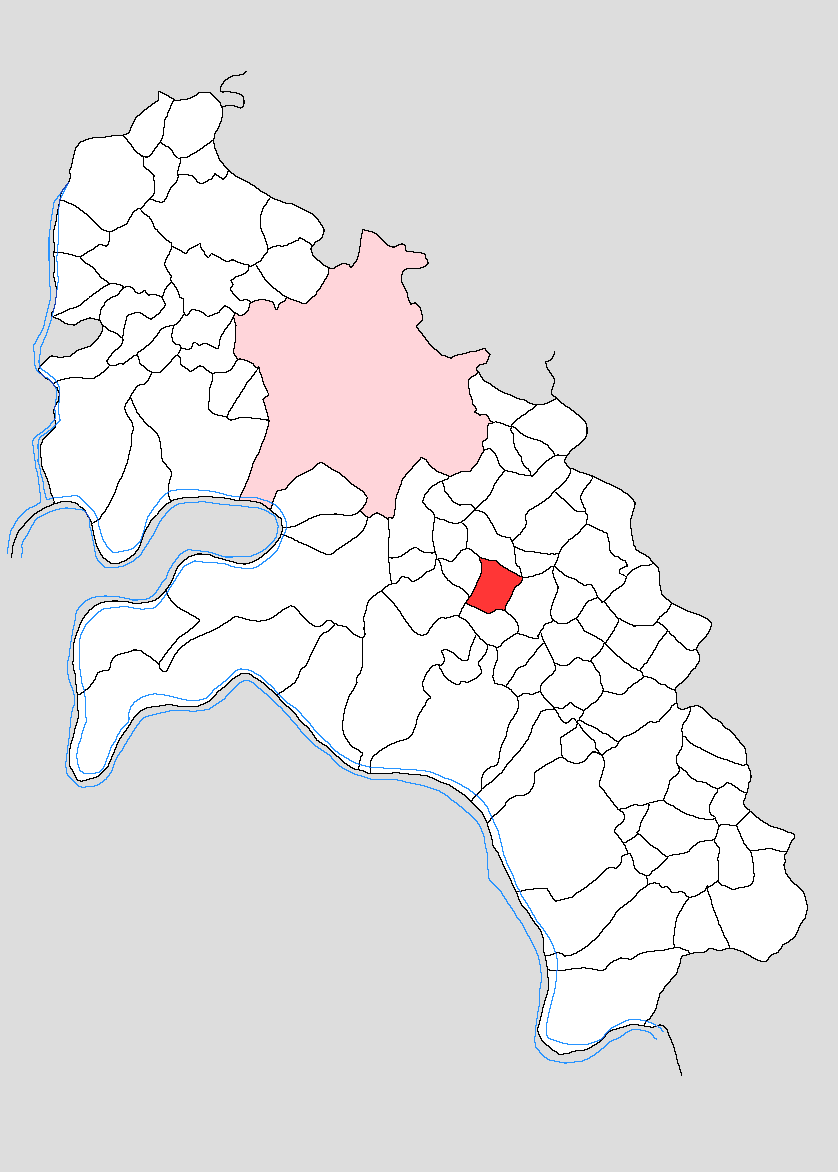
- Map showing Balchandpur in Firozabad block

- Location in Uttar Pradesh, India
- Coordinates: 27.10755°N 78.43646°E
- Country: India
- State: Uttar Pradesh
- District: Firozabad
- Tehsil: Firozabad

Area
  - Total: 1.412 km^{2} (0.545 sq mi)

Population (2011)
  - Total: 752
  - Density: 533/km^{2} (1,380/sq mi)
- Time zone: UTC+5:30 (IST)

Balchandpur (Bālchandpur), also spelled Balchandarpur, is a village in Firozabad block of Firozabad district, Uttar Pradesh. It is located southeast of Firozabad. As of 2011, it had a population of 752, in 125 households.

== Geography ==
Balchandpur is located southeast of Firozabad, on a rural road heading southeast from the city. The next village to the northwest along this road is Jamalpur, while the next one to the south, less than 1 km away, is Ladupur Chakarpur. The Firozabad Distributary canal passes by Balchandpur to the east; on the other side of the canal is a prominent tank. The surroundings are all level farmland. Other nearby villages include Nagla Mullah to the northeast, Jahangirpur to the west, Bilahna to the west-southwest, and Fatehpur Anandipur to the south.

== Demographics ==
As of 2011, Balchandpur had a population of 752, in 125 households. This population was 54.5% male (410) and 45.5% female (342). The 0–6 age group numbered 102 (56 male and 46 female), making up 13.6% of the total population. 95 residents were members of Scheduled Castes, or 12.6% of the total.

The 1981 census recorded Balchandpur as having a population of 450 people (245 male and 205 female), in 70 households and 70 physical houses.

The 1961 census recorded Balchandpur as comprising 1 hamlet, with a total population of 336 people (184 male and 152 female), in 49 households and 41 physical houses. The area of the village was given as 410 acres.

== Infrastructure ==
As of 2011, Balchandpur had 1 primary school and 1 primary health centre. Drinking water was provided by hand pump; there were no public toilets. The village did not have a post office or public library; there was at least some access to electricity for all purposes. Streets were made of both kachcha and pakka materials.
