= Matamai =

Village in Uttar Pradesh, India

- Village
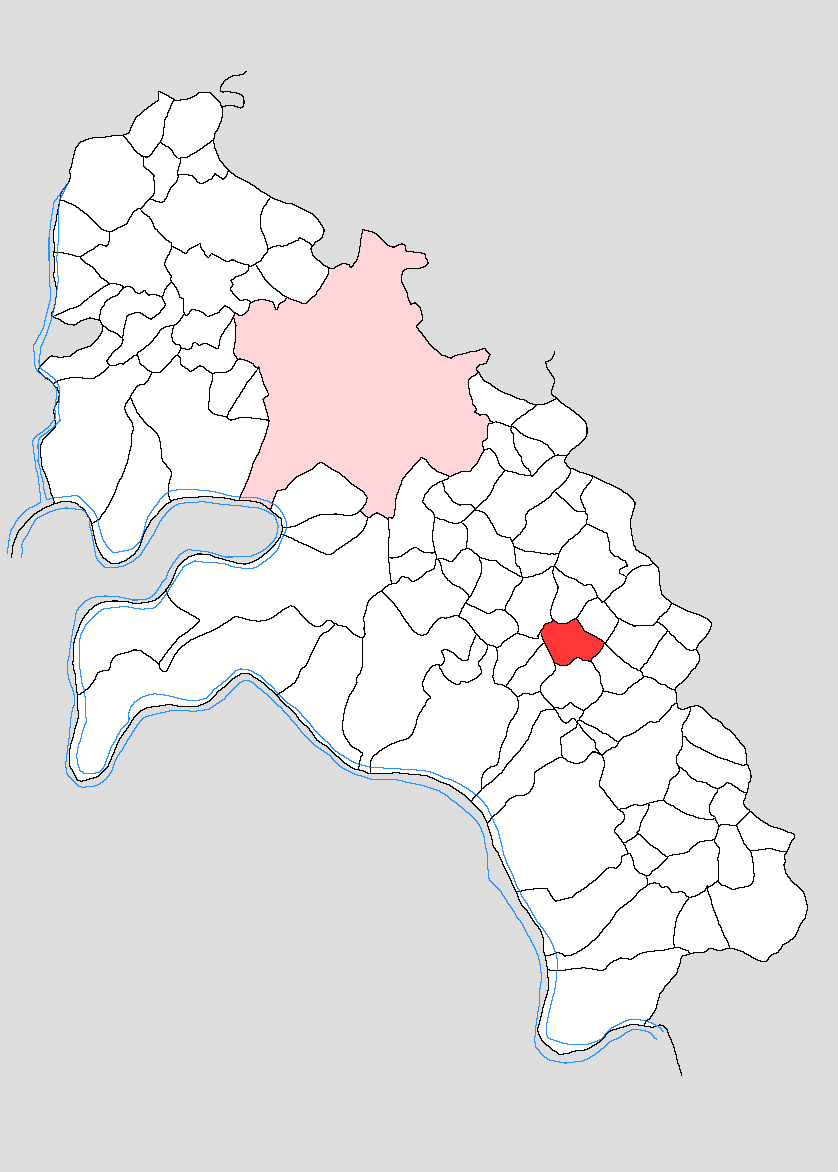
- Map showing Matamai in Firozabad block

- Location in Uttar Pradesh, India
- Coordinates: 27.09078°N 78.45517°E
- Country: India
- State: Uttar Pradesh
- District: Firozabad
- Tehsil: Firozabad

Area
  - Total: 1.554 km^{2} (0.600 sq mi)

Population (2011)
  - Total: 1,998
  - Density: 1,286/km^{2} (3,330/sq mi)
- Time zone: UTC+5:30 (IST)

Matamai (Matāmaī) is a village in Firozabad block of Firozabad district, Uttar Pradesh. It is located southeast of Firozabad. As of 2011, it had a population of 1,998, in 313 households.

== Geography ==
Matamai is located southeast of Firozabad, along a country road heading southeast from the city. The village of Ladupur Chakarpur is the next village to the northwest along this road, while Matsena is the next village to the southeast. The surrounding terrain is basically all level farmland. Besides Matsena and Ladupur Chakarpur, nearby villages include Kharsoli to the northeast, Hamirpur to the east, Phulaichi to the south-southeast, Salempur Anandipur to the southwest, and Luhari to the west.

== Demographics ==
As of 2011, Matamai had a population of 1,998, in 313 households. This population was 52.8% male (1,055) and 47.2% female (943). The 0–6 age group numbered 310 (169 male and 141 female), making up 15.5% of the total population. 394 residents were members of Scheduled Castes, or 19.0% of the total.

The 1981 census recorded Matamai as having a population of 958 people (502 male and 456 female), in 161 households and 155 physical houses.

The 1961 census recorded Matamai as comprising 1 hamlet, with a total population of 724 people (383 male and 341 female), in 117 households and 63 physical houses. The area of the village was given as 384 acres.

== Infrastructure ==
As of 2011, Matamai had 1 primary school; it did not have any healthcare facilities. Drinking water was provided by tap and hand pump; there were no public toilets. The village did not have a post office or public library; there was at least some access to electricity for all purposes. Streets were made of both kachcha and pakka materials.
