= Jamalpur, Firozabad =

Village in Uttar Pradesh, India

Jamalpur
- Village
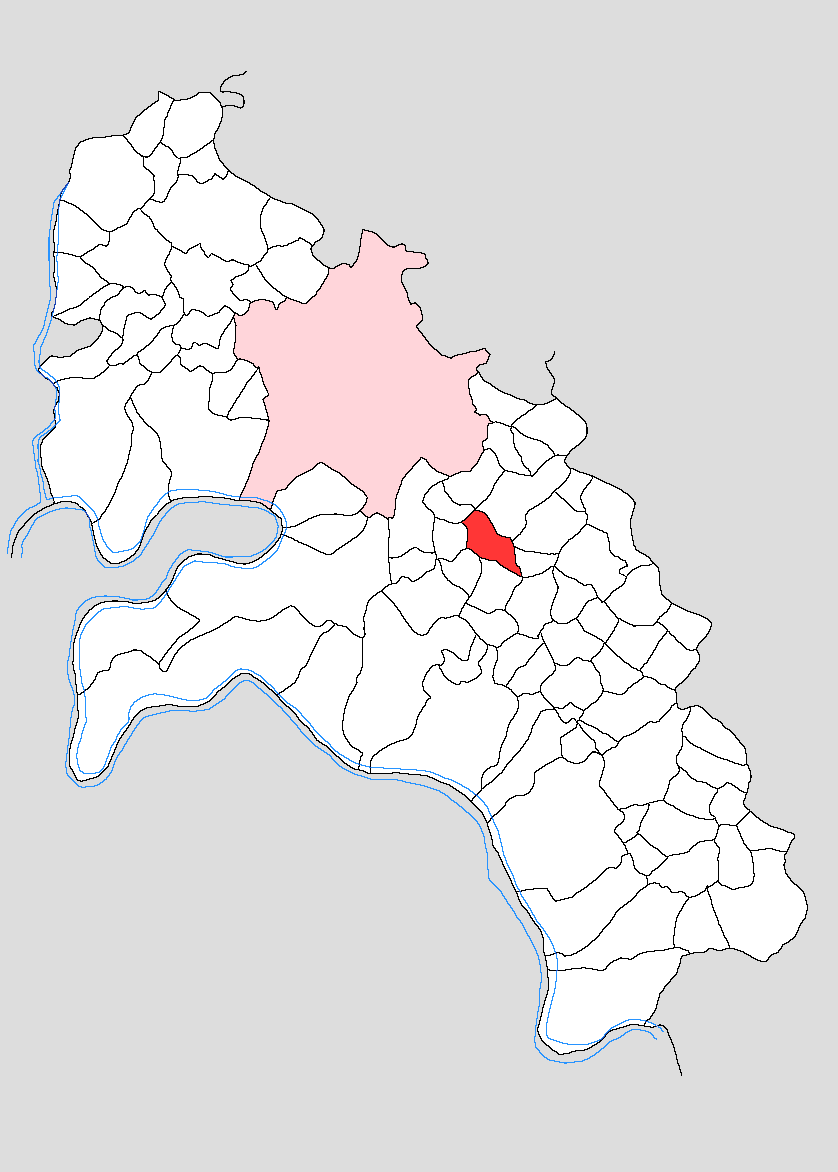
- Map showing Jamalpur in Firozabad block

- Location in Uttar Pradesh, India
- Coordinates: 27.1184°N 78.42907°E
- Country: India
- State: Uttar Pradesh
- District: Firozabad
- Tehsil: Firozabad

Area
  - Total: 1.549 km^{2} (0.598 sq mi)

Population (2011)
  - Total: 2,383
  - Density: 1,538/km^{2} (3,984/sq mi)
- Time zone: UTC+5:30 (IST)

Jamalpur (Jamālpur) is a village in Firozabad block of Firozabad district, Uttar Pradesh. It is located southeast of Firozabad. As of 2011, it had a population of 2,383, in 390 households.

== Geography ==
Jamalpur is located southeast of Firozabad along a rural road that continues southeast from Jamalpur to Balchandpur and then on to Matamai. The Firozabad Distributary canal passes by Jamalpur on the north side. The surrounding area is basically entirely farmland, and the terrain is basically flat. The village of Ghazipur is a short distance northwest of Jamalpur on the road to Firozabad, and Paharpur is a similar distance to the southwest of Jamalpur.

== Demographics ==
As of 2011, Jamalpur had a population of 2,383, in 390 households. This population was 55.5% male (1,322) and 44.5% female (1,061). The 0–6 age group numbered 303 (150 male and 153 female), making up 22.0% of the total population. 128 residents were members of Scheduled Castes, or 5.4% of the total.

The 1981 census recorded Jamalpur as having a population of 1,184 people (666 male and 518 female), in 184 households and 184 physical houses.

The 1961 census recorded Jamalpur as comprising 1 hamlet, with a total population of 793 people (422 male and 371 female), in 125 households and 88 physical houses. The area of the village was given as 386 acres.

== Infrastructure ==
As of 2011, Jamalpur had 1 primary school; it did not have any healthcare facilities. Drinking water was provided by tap and hand pump; there were no public toilets. The village did not have a post office or public library; there was at least some access to electricity for all purposes. Streets were made of both kachcha and pakka materials.
