= Usaini =

Village in Uttar Pradesh, India

- Village
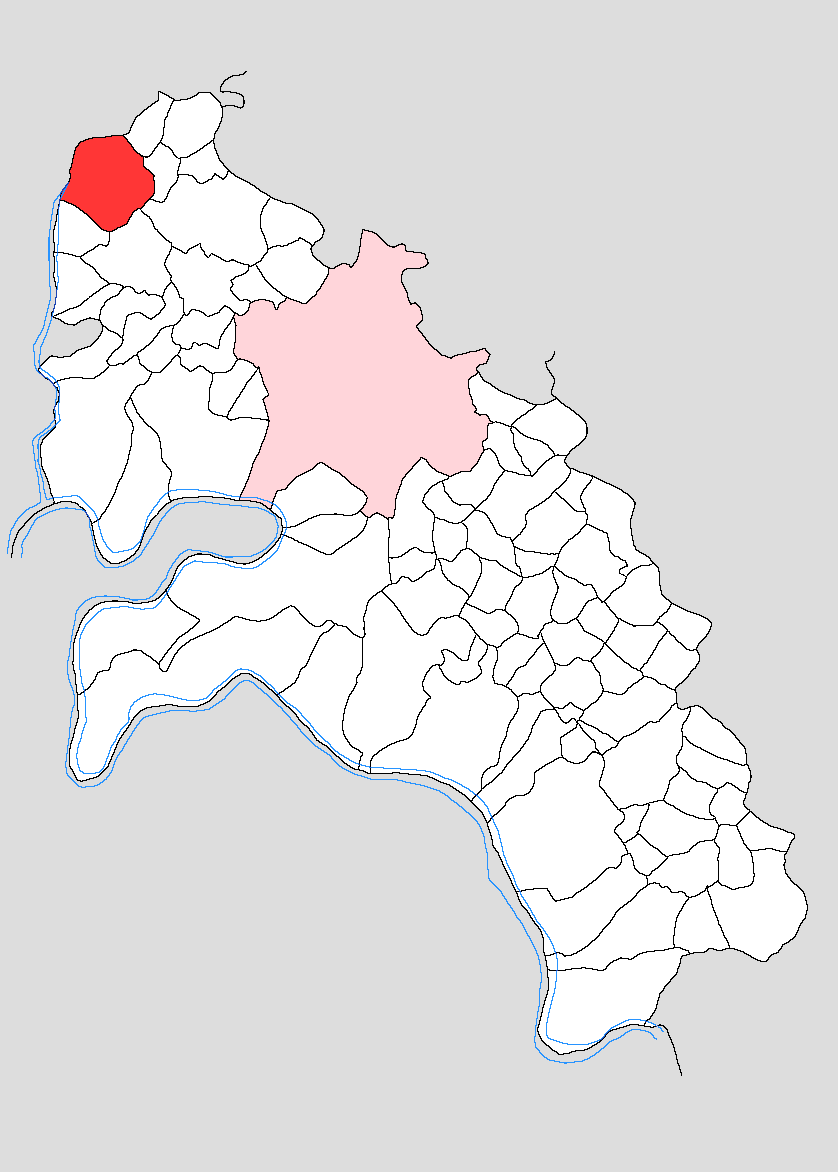
- Map showing Usaini in Firozabad block

- Location in Uttar Pradesh, India
- Coordinates: 27.20338°N 78.31996°E
- Country: India
- State: Uttar Pradesh
- District: Firozabad
- Tehsil: Firozabad

Area
  - Total: 5.526 km^{2} (2.134 sq mi)

Population (2011)
  - Total: 4,161
  - Density: 753.0/km^{2} (1,950/sq mi)
- Time zone: UTC+5:30 (IST)

Usaini (Usāinī) is a large village in Firozabad block of Firozabad district, Uttar Pradesh. As of 2011, it had a population of 4,161, in 664 households.

== Geography ==
Usaini is located northwest of Firozabad, on the old NH 2. A small stream called the Jhirna Nala flows past the village on the west, and the Nagau distributary canal passes by it on the east. To the south are the villages of Nagau and Salempur Nagla Khar; to the southeast, on the highway, is Alinagar Kenjra, and to the east, north of the highway, is Jarauli Kalan. The hamlet of Habibpur is located to the northeast of Usaini. Across the Jhirna Nala to the west are the villages of Hazratpur and Garhi Jafar.

== Demographics ==
As of 2011, Usaini had a population of 4,161, in 664 households. This population was 51.9% male (2,160) and 48.1% female (2,001). The 0-6 age group numbered 610 (334 male and 276 female), making up 14.7% of the total population. 1,256 residents were members of Scheduled Castes, or 30.2% of the total.

The 1981 census recorded Usaini as having a population of 2,253 people (1,213 male and 1,040 female), in 395 households and 393 physical houses.

The 1961 census recorded Usaini as comprising 3 hamlets, with a total population of 1,465 people (781 male and 684 female), in 265 households and 196 physical houses. The area of the village was given as 1,365 acres and it had a post office and medical practitioner at that point.

== Infrastructure ==
As of 2011, Usaini had 4 primary schools and 1 community health centre. Drinking water was provided by tap and hand pump; there were no public toilets. The village had a sub post office and public library; there was at least some access to electricity for all purposes. Streets were made of both kachcha and pakka materials.
