= Jalupura =

Village in Uttar Pradesh, India

- Village
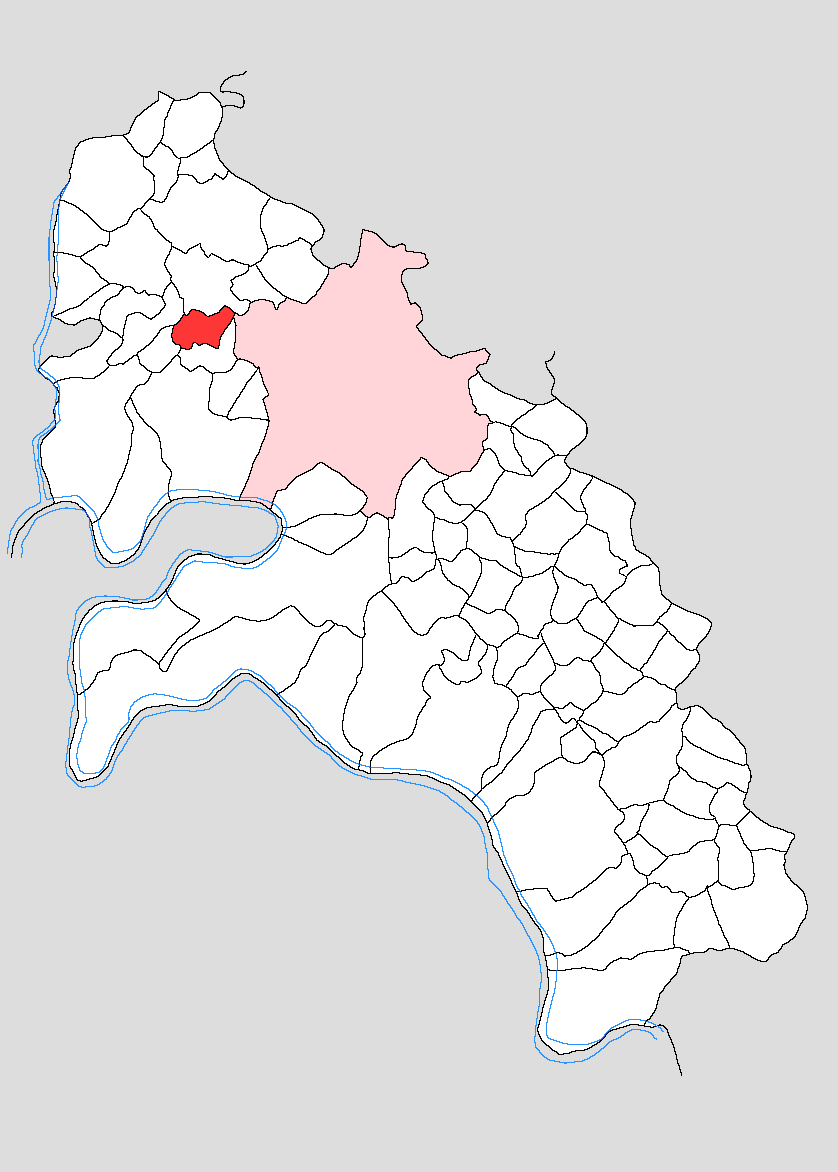
- Map showing Jalupura in Firozabad block

- Location in Uttar Pradesh, India
- Coordinates: 27.16967°N 78.34455°E
- Country: India
- State: Uttar Pradesh
- District: Firozabad
- Tehsil: Firozabad

Area
  - Total: 1.488 km^{2} (0.575 sq mi)

Population (2011)
  - Total: 2,681
  - Density: 1,802/km^{2} (4,667/sq mi)
- Time zone: UTC+5:30 (IST)

Jalupura (Jalupurā) is a village in Firozabad block of Firozabad district, Uttar Pradesh. As of 2011, it had a population of 2,681, in 422 households.

== Geography ==
Jalupura is located a short distance northwest of Firozabad, a bit north of the main line of the Northern Railway. The Nagau distributary canal passes close to the north side of the village. The village of Alinagar Kenjra is to the north, on the main highway; Jarauli Khurd is to the west, and Alampur Jarkhi is to the south, by the train tracks.

== Demographics ==
As of 2011, Jalupura had a population of 2,681, in 422 households. This population was 55.0% male (1,475) and 45.0% female (1,206). The 0–6 age group numbered 405 (221 male and 184 female), making up 15.1% of the total population. 118 residents were members of Scheduled Castes, or 4.4% of the total.

The 1981 census recorded Jalupura (as "Jalopura") as having a population of 1,421 people (761 male and 660 female), in 221 households and 217 physical houses.

The 1961 census recorded Jalupura as comprising 1 hamlet, with a total population of 912 people (507 male and 405 female), in 145 households and 119 physical houses. The area of the village was given as 368 acres and it had a medical practitioner at that point.

== Infrastructure ==
As of 2011, Jalupura had 2 primary schools and 1 primary health sub centre. Drinking water was provided by hand pump; there were no public toilets. The village did not have a post office or public library; there was at least some access to electricity for all purposes. Streets were made of both kachcha and pakka materials.
