= Salempur Nagla Khar =

Village in Uttar Pradesh, India

- Village
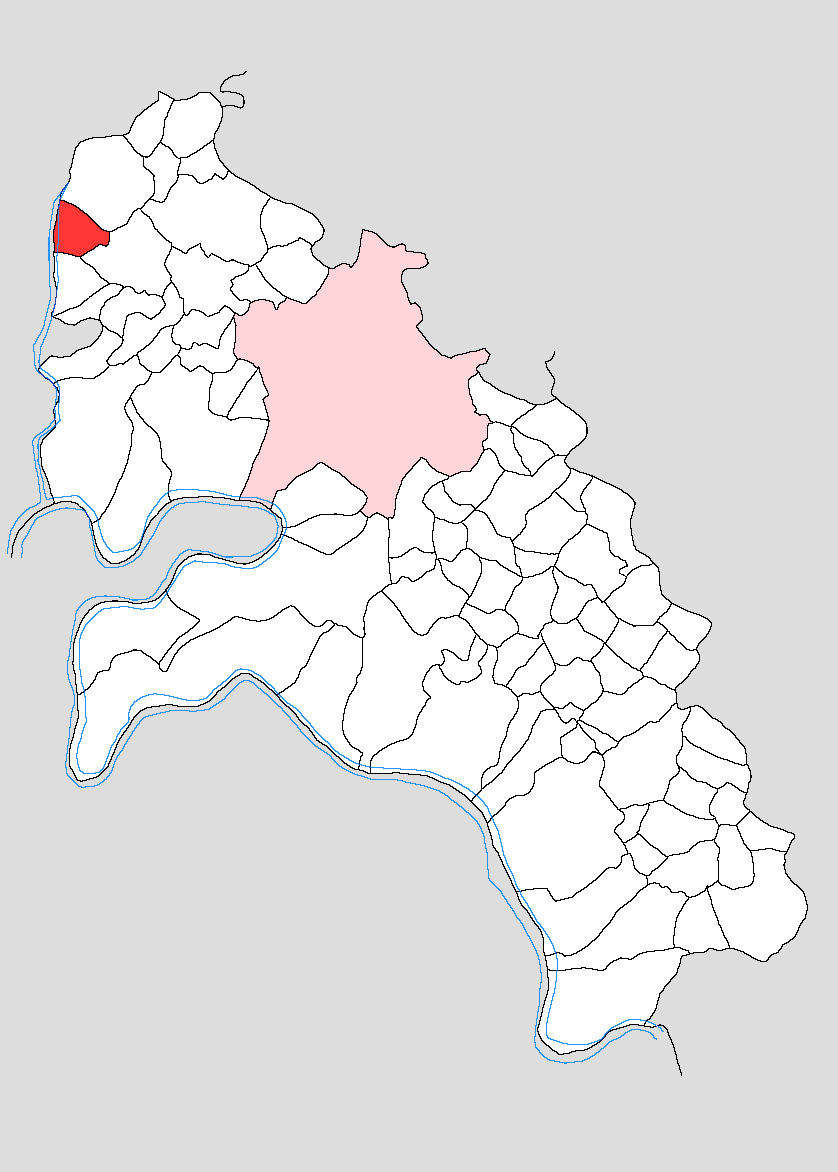
- Map showing Salempur Nagla Khar in Firozabad block

- Location in Uttar Pradesh, India
- Coordinates: 27.19399°N 78.31255°E
- Country: India
- State: Uttar Pradesh
- District: Firozabad
- Tehsil: Firozabad

Area
  - Total: 1.756 km^{2} (0.678 sq mi)

Population (2011)
  - Total: 3,290
  - Density: 1,870/km^{2} (4,850/sq mi)
- Time zone: UTC+5:30 (IST)

Salempur Nagla Khar (Salempur Naglā Khār) is a village in Firozabad block of Firozabad district, Uttar Pradesh. As of 2011, it had a population of 3,290, in 489 households.

== Geography ==
"Salempur" (or "Salimpur") and "Nagla Khar" are two alternate names for the same settlement. It is located northwest of the city of Firozabad, and south of the old NH 2. The village of Usaini is located north of Salempur Nagla Khar, on the highway; the village of Nagau is to the east, and Ulau is to the south. The upper stretches of the Jhirna Nala flow past Salempur Nagla Khar, a bit to the west of the village site.

== Demographics ==
As of 2011, Salempur Nagla Khar had a population of 3,290, in 489 households. This population was 54.1% male (1,779) and 45.9% female (1,511). The 0–6 age group numbered 546 (282 male and 264 female), making up 16.6% of the total population. 60 residents were members of Scheduled Castes, or 1.8% of the total.

The 1981 census recorded Salempur Nagla Khar (as "Salempur Nagla Khas") as having a population of 1,556 people (848 male and 708 female), in 245 households and 243 physical houses.

The 1961 census recorded Salempur Nagla Khar as comprising 1 hamlet, with a total population of exactly 1,000 people (544 male and 456 female), in 174 households and 117 physical houses. The area of the village was given as 431 acres.

== Infrastructure ==
As of 2011, Salempur Nagla Khar had 2 primary schools; it did not have any healthcare facilities. Drinking water was provided by tap, hand pump, and tube well/bore well; there were no public toilets. The village did not have a post office or public library; there was at least some access to electricity for residential and agricultural (but not commercial) purposes. Streets were made of both kachcha and pakka materials.
