= Jarauli Khurd =

Village in Uttar Pradesh, India

- Village
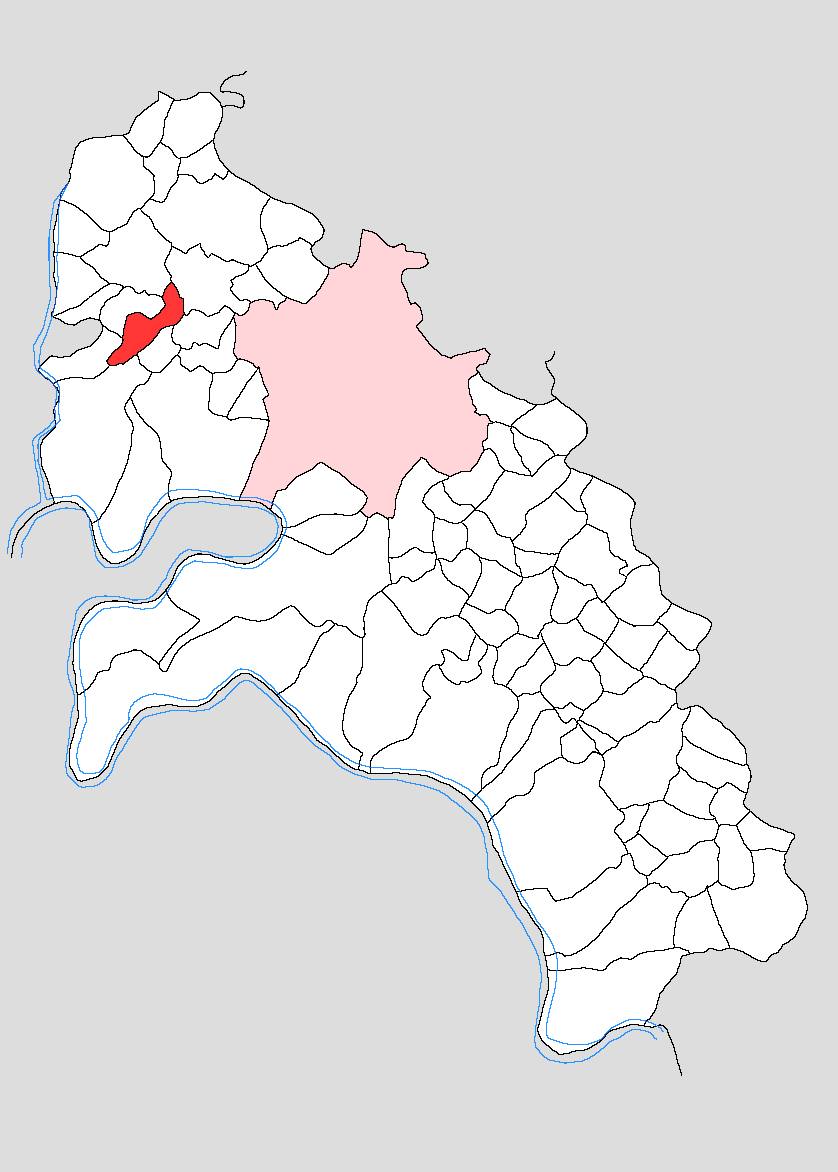
- Map showing Jarauli Khurd in Firozabad block

- Location in Uttar Pradesh, India
- Coordinates: 27.17416°N 78.33666°E
- Country: India
- State: Uttar Pradesh
- District: Firozabad
- Tehsil: Firozabad

Area
  - Total: 1.829 km^{2} (0.706 sq mi)

Population (2011)
  - Total: 3,094
  - Density: 1,692/km^{2} (4,381/sq mi)
- Time zone: UTC+5:30 (IST)

Jarauli Khurd (Jaraulī Khurd) is a large village in Firozabad block of Firozabad district, Uttar Pradesh. As of 2011, it had a population of 3,094, in 533 households.

== Geography ==
Jarauli Kalan is located northwest of Firozabad, between the old NH 2 to the north and the main line of the Northern Railway to the south. The Nagau distributary canal passes near the village on the northeast. Nearby villages include Alinagar Kenjra to the north, Hirangaon to the west, and Jalupura to the east.

== Demographics ==
As of 2011, Jarauli Khurd had a population of 3,094, in 533 households. This population was 54.7% male (1,692) and 45.3% female (1,402). The 0-6 age group numbered 497 (268 male and 229 female), making up 16.1% of the total population. 415 residents were members of Scheduled Castes, or 13.4% of the total.

The 1981 census recorded Jarauli Khurd as having a population of 1,571 people (851 male and 720 female), in 225 households and 210 physical houses.

The 1961 census recorded Jarauli Khurd as comprising 2 hamlets, with a total population of 909 people (467 male and 442 female), in 140 households and 86 physical houses. The area of the village was given as 443 acres.

== Infrastructure ==
As of 2011, Jarauli Khurd had 1 primary schools; it did not have any healthcare facilities. Drinking water was provided by hand pump and tube well/borehole; there were no public toilets. The village did not have a post office or public library; there was at least some access to electricity for residential and agricultural (but not commercial) purposes. Streets were made of both kachcha and pakka materials.
