= Hirangaon =

Village in Uttar Pradesh, India

Hirangaon Hirangau
- Village
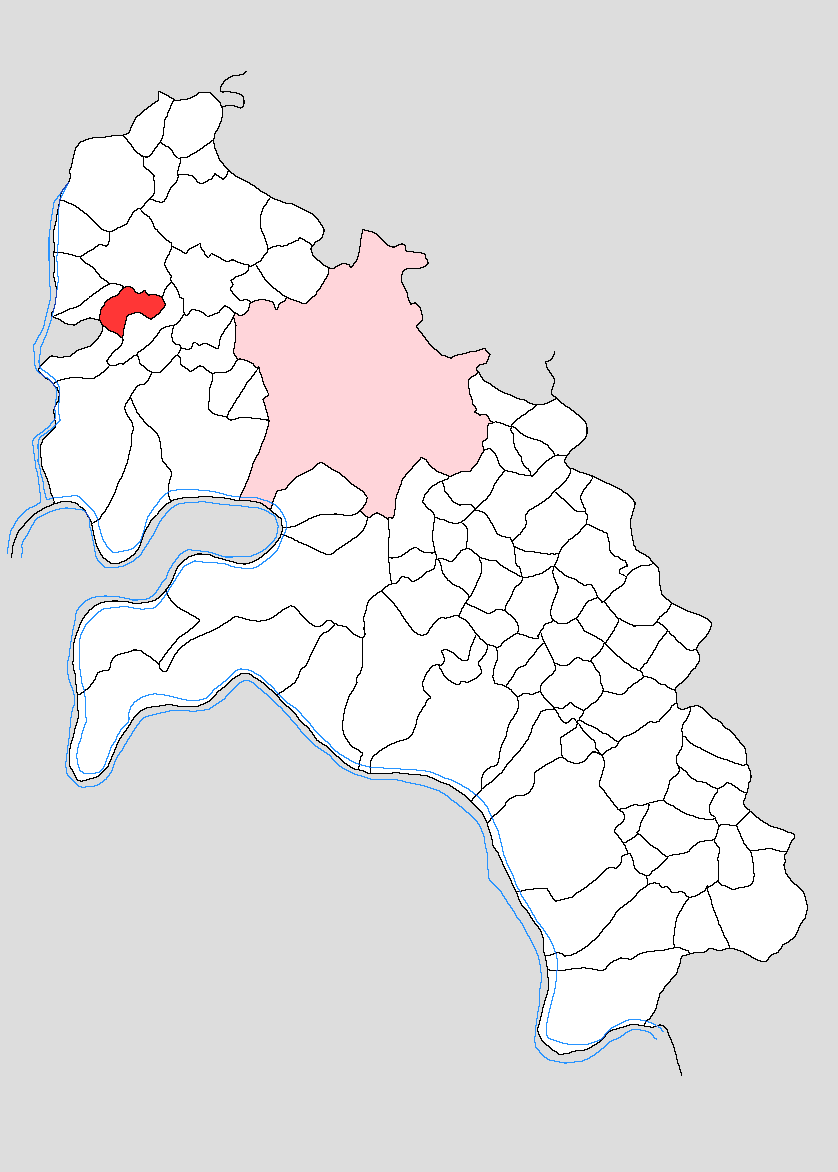
- Map showing Hirangaon in Firozabad block

- Location in Uttar Pradesh, India
- Coordinates: 27.1776°N 78.3305°E
- Country: India
- State: Uttar Pradesh
- District: Firozabad
- Tehsil: Firozabad

Area
  - Total: 1.11 km^{2} (0.43 sq mi)
- Elevation: 167 m (548 ft)

Population (2011)
  - Total: 695
  - Density: 626/km^{2} (1,620/sq mi)
- Time zone: UTC+5:30 (IST)
- PIN: 283103
- Telephone code: 05612
- Vehicle registration: UP 83
- Website: firozabad.nic.in

Hirangaon (Hirangau) is a small village in Firozabad block of Firozabad district, Uttar Pradesh. It is part of Jarauli Khurd gram panchayat. As of 2011, Hirangaon had a population of 695, in 120 households.

== Geography ==
Hirangaon is located west of Firozabad city, with the old NH 2 to the north and the main line of the Northern Railway to the south. There is a Hirangaon railway station station, but it is actually located in the adjacent village of Khemkaranpur to the southwest. A country road on the west side of Hirangaon connects to Khemkaranpur in the southwest and to Alinagar Kenjra (and the highway) in the north. Another small road connects Hirangaon with the village of Jarauli Khurd to the east. There is a prominent irrigation tank on the north side of Hirangaon.

Hirangaon is divided into four mohallas: Tiwari Mohalla, Sototi Mohalla, Dikshit Mohalla, and Jatav Mohalla.

== Demographics ==
As of 2011, Hirangaon had a population of 695, in 110 households. This population was 55.3% male (384) and 44.7% female (311). The 0-6 age group numbered 95 (48 male and 47 female), making up 13.7% of the total population. 342 residents were members of Scheduled Castes, or 49.2% of the total.

People from many communities reside in this village, called a village of Brahmins, because of being settled away from densely settled settlement and being open and peaceful, green environment and traffic problem. These include Brahmin, Jatav, Barber, Kori, Kachi, Valmiki, Tiwari, Srooti, Mudgal, Pathak, Joshi, Tenuguriya and Dixit.

The 1981 census recorded Hirangaon as having a population of 511 people (278 male and 233 female), in 89 households and 89 physical houses.

The 1961 census recorded Hirangaon (as "Hirangau") as comprising 1 hamlet, with a total population of 402 people (210 male and 192 female), in 67 households and 48 physical houses. The area of the village was given as 274 acres and it had a post office at that point.

== Infrastructure ==
As of 2011, Hirangaon had 1 primary school and 1 primary health sub centre. Drinking water was provided by hand pump; there were no public toilets. The village did not have a post office or public library; there was at least some access to electricity for all purposes. Streets were made of both kachcha and pakka materials.

== Economy ==
The three most significant agricultural crops produced at Hirangaon are barley, potato, and mustard. Most of the people here were formerly employed in government service but most of the time now depend on factories. Currently, the person who is employed in the government service is residing in the city outside the village.

== Religion and culture ==
There are temples of goddesses all around Hirangaon, which protect against the plight of this village. If a person dies in this village then that person Kada Samskar is performed by sitting in it like yoga action while other villages There is no such practice in other villages by the cremation of any deceased person, this tradition is done in the person's progenitor sages of the village of Hirangaon. Free of sage sage in ancient times because connecting Yogsadna your yoga practice would be absorbed into Sage Exchange in response to Hirngav Narki Tehsil, South Fatehabad in West Tundla tehsil and former Shikohabad the tehsil. Agra mandal is 42 km away, in which many Mughal historical monuments are decorated.
