= Jarauli Kalan =

Village in Uttar Pradesh, India

- Village
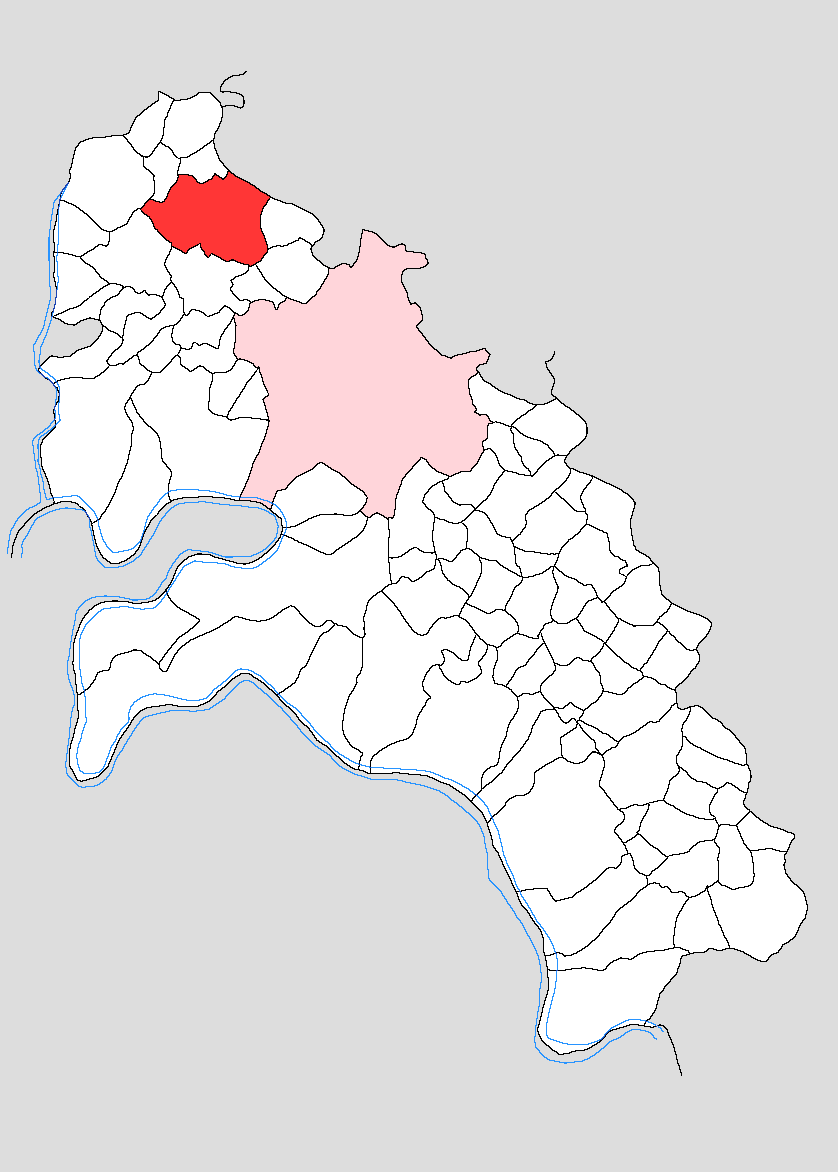
- Map showing Jarauli Kalan in Firozabad block

- Location in Uttar Pradesh, India
- Coordinates: 27.19918°N 78.34735°E
- Country: India
- State: Uttar Pradesh
- District: Firozabad
- Tehsil: Firozabad

Area
  - Total: 6.895 km^{2} (2.662 sq mi)

Population (2011)
  - Total: 6,171
  - Density: 895.0/km^{2} (2,318/sq mi)
- Time zone: UTC+5:30 (IST)

Jarauli Kalan (Jaraulī Kalān) is a large village in Firozabad block of Firozabad district, Uttar Pradesh. As of 2011, it had a population of 6,171, in 1,020 households.

== Geography ==
Jarauli Kalan is located northwest of Firozabad, north of the old NH 2. Nearby villages include Alinagar Kenjra to the south and Usaini to the west.

== Demographics ==
As of 2011, Jarauli Kalan had a population of 6,171, in 1,020 households. This population was 53.1% male (3,278) and 46.9% female (2,893). The 0-6 age group numbered 1,001 (529 male and 472 female), making up 16.2% of the total population. 1,552 residents were members of Scheduled Castes, or 25.1% of the total.

The 1981 census recorded Jarauli Kalan as having a population of 2,858 people (1,555 male and 1,303 female), in 512 households and 487 physical houses.

The 1961 census recorded Jarauli Kalan as comprising 5 hamlets, with a total population of 1,815 people (953 male and 862 female), in 357 households and 267 physical houses. The area of the village was given as 1,704 acres and it had a post office at that point.

== Infrastructure ==
As of 2011, Jarauli Kalan had 2 primary schools; it did not have any healthcare facilities. Drinking water was provided by tap and hand pump; there were no public toilets. The village had a sub post office but no public library; there was at least some access to electricity for all purposes. Streets were made of both kachcha and pakka materials.
