= Alampur Jarkhi =

Village in Uttar Pradesh, India

- Village
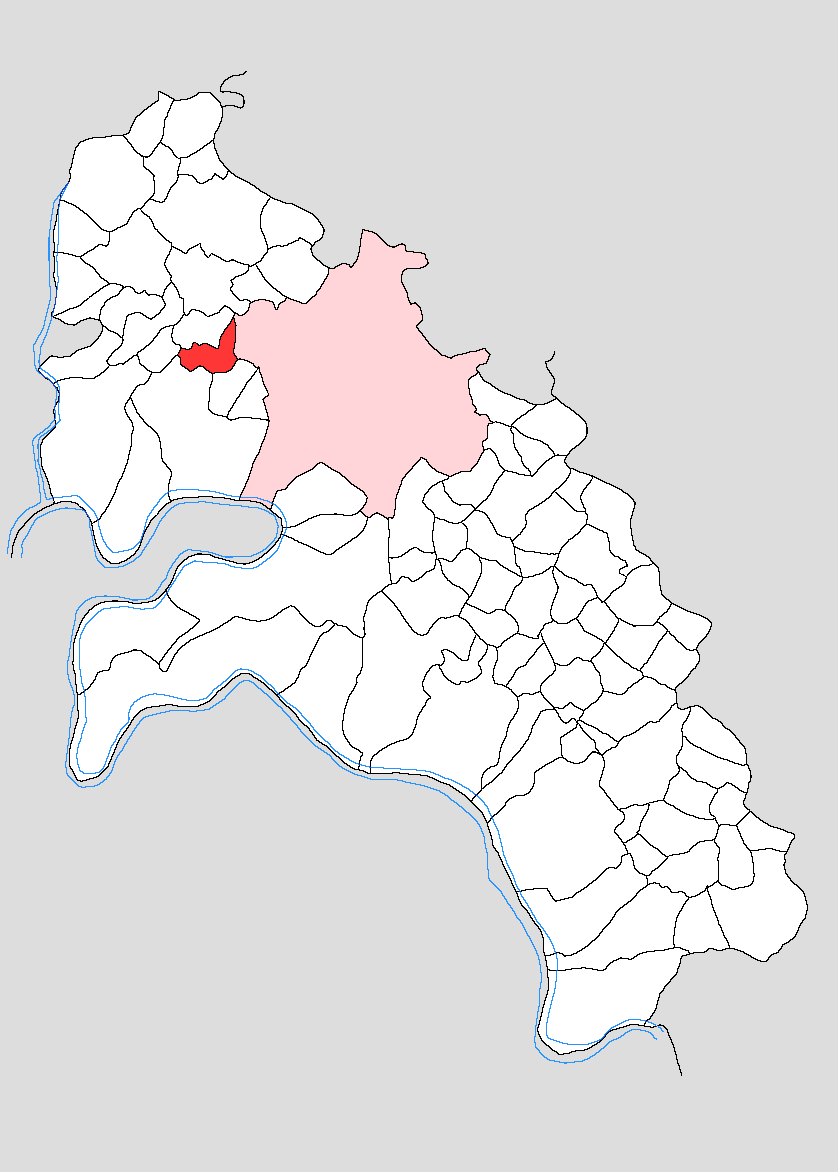
- Map showing Alampur Jarkhi in Firozabad block

- Location in Uttar Pradesh, India
- Coordinates: 27.1639°N 78.34707°E
- Country: India
- State: Uttar Pradesh
- District: Firozabad
- Tehsil: Firozabad

Area
  - Total: 1.342 km^{2} (0.518 sq mi)

Population (2011)
  - Total: 1,481
  - Density: 1,104/km^{2} (2,858/sq mi)
- Time zone: UTC+5:30 (IST)

Alampur Jarkhi (Ālampur Jārkhī) is a village in Firozabad block of Firozabad district, Uttar Pradesh. As of 2011, it had a population of 1,481, in 242 households.

== Geography ==
Alampur Jarkhi is located a short distance northwest of Firozabad, on the main line of the Northern Railway. The train tracks pass by the south side of the village. The village of Jalupura is a short distance to the northwest.

== Demographics ==
As of 2011, Alampur Jarkhi had a population of 1,481, in 242 households. This population was 54.8% male (812) and 45.2% female (669). The 0–6 age group numbered 235 (125 male and 110 female), making up 15.9% of the total population. 95 residents were members of Scheduled Castes, or 6.4% of the total.

The 1981 census recorded Alampur Jarkhi as having a population of 952 people (530 male and 422 female), in 162 households and 153 physical houses.

The 1961 census recorded Alampur Jarkhi as comprising 1 hamlet, with a total population of 630 people (335 male and 295 female), in 102 households and 73 physical houses. The area of the village was given as 328 acres.

== Infrastructure ==
As of 2011, Alampur Jarkhi had 1 primary school; it did not have any healthcare facilities. Drinking water was provided by hand pump and tube well/bore well; there were no public toilets. The village did not have a post office or public library; there was at least some access to electricity for all purposes. Streets were made of both kachcha and pakka materials.
