= Alinagar Kenjra =

Village in Uttar Pradesh, India

- Village
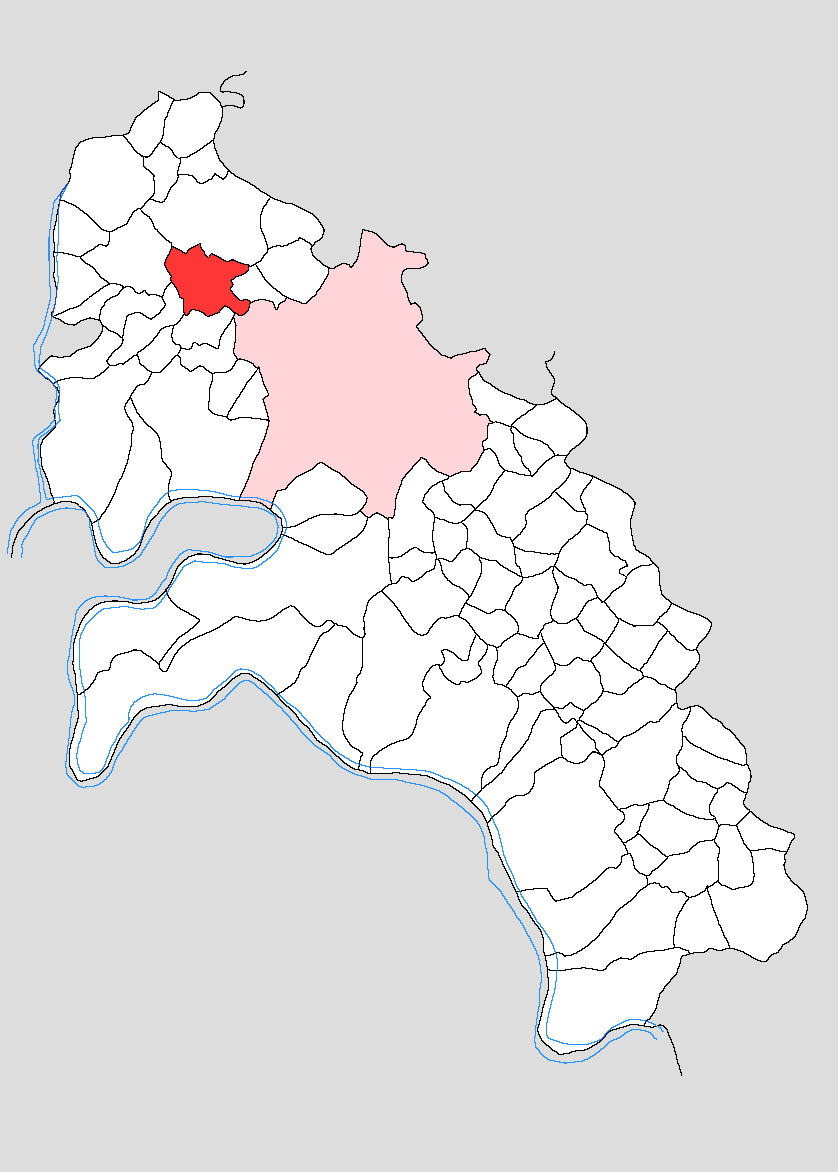
- Map showing Alinagar Kenjra in Firozabad block

- Location in Uttar Pradesh, India
- Coordinates: 27.18367°N 78.3484°E
- Country: India
- State: Uttar Pradesh
- District: Firozabad
- Tehsil: Firozabad

Area
  - Total: 3.185 km^{2} (1.230 sq mi)

Population (2011)
  - Total: 11,098
  - Density: 3,484/km^{2} (9,025/sq mi)
- Time zone: UTC+5:30 (IST)

Alinagar Kenjra (Alīnagar Keñjrā) is a large village in Firozabad block of Firozabad district, Uttar Pradesh. It is located just northwest of the city of Firozabad. As of 2011, it had a population of 11,098, in 1,728 households.

== Geography ==
Alinagar Kenjra is located just northwest of Firozabad along the old NH 2. There is a prominent irrigation tank on the north side of the highway. There are a couple of outlying hamlets such as Nagla Sala and Nagla Jaunpal to the south as well as Nagla Gola to the north. The villages of Jarauli Khurd and Jalupura are located to the south; Jarauli Kalan is to the north, and Hirangaon and Nagau are to the west.

== Demographics ==
As of 2011, Alinagar Kenjra had a population of 11,098, in 1,728 households. This population was 54.5% male (6,048) and 45.5% female (5,050). The 0-6 age group numbered 1,656 (906 male and 750 female), making up 14.9% of the total population. 1,739 residents were members of Scheduled Castes, or 15.7% of the total.

The 1981 census recorded Alinagar Kenjra (as "Alinagar Kejara") as having a population of 5,658 people (3,081 male and 2,577 female), in 869 households and 867 physical houses.

The 1961 census recorded Alinagar Kenjra as comprising 5 hamlets, with a total population of 3,194 people (1,750 male and 1,444 female), in 536 households and 402 physical houses. The area of the village was given as 786 acres and it had a post office and medical practitioner at that point.

== Infrastructure ==
As of 2011, Alinagar Kenjra had 1 primary health sub centre The village is known for its strong focus on primary education and has a total of five primary schools. Among these, Hubalaal Balika Vidyalaya holds a special distinction as the oldest girls' primary school in the entire Firozabad district. It was founded by Late Babu Ram Yadav, a respected figure known for his dedication to girls' education and social development in the region.. Drinking water was provided by hand pump; there were no public toilets. The village had a sub post office but no public library; there was at least some access to electricity for all purposes. Streets were made of both kachcha and pakka materials.

At the Main Cross road of Alinagar kenjra or Raja ka taal there is a Yadav Dharmshala.It was opened for the stay of marriage for poor people by the old JAMINDAR CHAUDHARY KARAN SINGH YADAV son of DAULAT RAM YADAV.The son of CHAUDHARY KARAN SINGH YADAV is CHAUDHARY GANDHARV SINGH YADAV who is well recognised landlord in all area near Alinagar kenjra.He is one of the most richest landlord in this region.
