= Nagau, Uttar Pradesh =

Village in Uttar Pradesh, India

Nagau
- Village
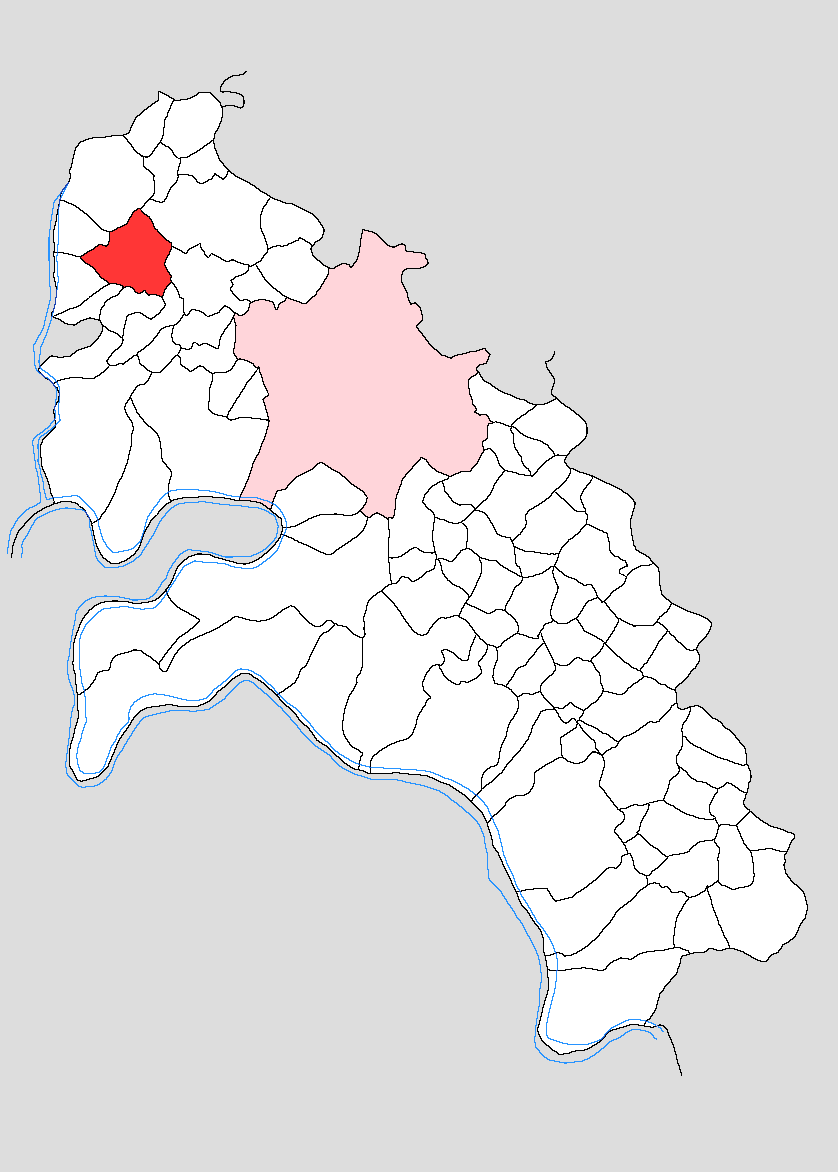
- Map showing Nagau in Firozabad block

- Location in Uttar Pradesh, India
- Coordinates: 27.18963°N 78.32595°E
- Country: India
- State: Uttar Pradesh
- District: Firozabad
- Tehsil: Firozabad

Area
  - Total: 4.015 km^{2} (1.550 sq mi)

Population (2011)
  - Total: 4,144
  - Density: 1,032/km^{2} (2,673/sq mi)
- Time zone: UTC+5:30 (IST)

Nagau (Nāgaū) is a village in Firozabad block of Firozabad district, Uttar Pradesh. As of 2011, it had a population of 4,144, in 676 households.

== Geography ==
Nagau is located northwest of Firozabad, with the old NH 2 a bit to the north of the village. Along the highway, the village of Usaini is northwest of Nagau, while Alinagar Kenjra is to the southeast. South of the highway, the village of Salempur Nagla Khar is to the northwest of Nagau, and Ulau is to the southwest. The Nagau distributary canal passes by Nagau on the east.

== Demographics ==
As of 2011, Nagau had a population of 4,144, in 676 households. This population was 53.8% male (2,230) and 46.2% female (1,914). The 0–6 age group numbered 616 (331 male and 285 female), making up 14.9% of the total population. 1,967 residents were members of Scheduled Castes, or 47.5% of the total.

The 1981 census recorded Nagau as having a population of 2,243 people (1,250 male and 993 female), in 358 households and 358 physical houses.

The 1961 census recorded Nagau as comprising 3 hamlets, with a total population of 1,531 people (822 male and 709 female), in 250 households and 142 physical houses. The area of the village was given as 992 acres and it had a medical practitioner at that point.

== Infrastructure ==
As of 2011, Nagau had 2 primary schools; it did not have any healthcare facilities. Drinking water was provided by tap, hand pump, and tube well/bore well; there were no public toilets. The village did not have a post office or public library; there was at least some access to electricity for residential and agricultural (but not commercial) purposes. Streets were made of both kachcha and pakka materials.
