= Garhi Jafar =

Village in Uttar Pradesh, India

- Village
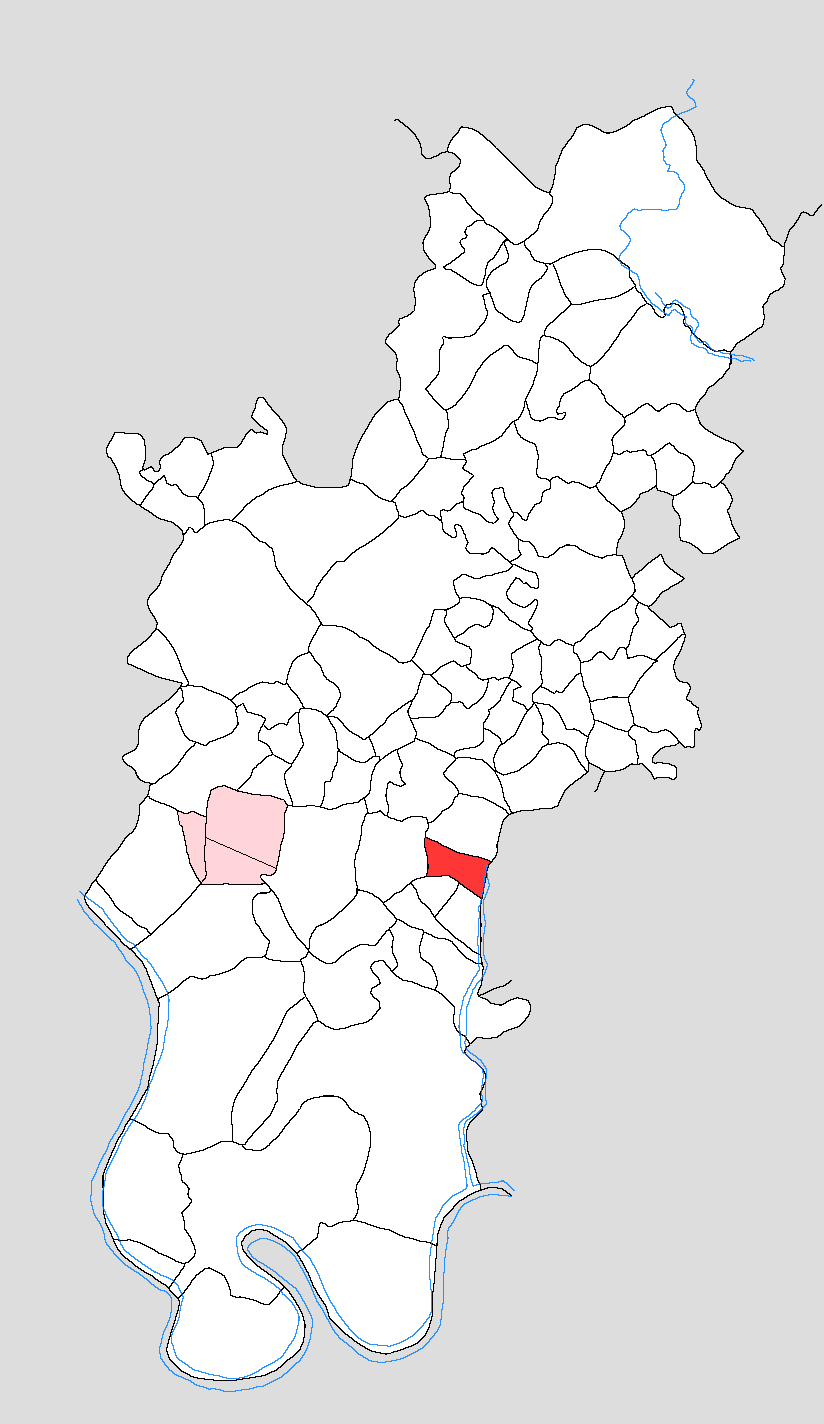
- Map showing Garhi Jafar in Tundla block

- Location in Uttar Pradesh, India
- Coordinates: 27.20387°N 78.29326°E
- Country: India
- State: Uttar Pradesh
- District: Firozabad
- Tehsil: Tundla

Area
  - Total: 1.691 km^{2} (0.653 sq mi)

Population (2011)
  - Total: 2,669
  - Density: 1,578/km^{2} (4,088/sq mi)
- Time zone: UTC+5:30 (IST)
- PIN: 283204

Garhi Jafar (Gaṛhī Jāfar) is a village in Tundla block of Firozabad district, Uttar Pradesh. As of 2011, it has a population of 2,669, in 380 households.

== Demographics ==
As of 2011, Garhi Jafar had a population of 2,669, in 380 households. This population was 54.2% male (1,447) and 45.8% female (1,222). The 0–6 age group numbered 443 (242 male and 201 female), making up 16.6% of the total population. 1 resident was a Scheduled Castes member, or 0.04% of the total.

The 1981 census recorded Garhi Jafar as having a population of 1,205 people (661 male and 544 female), in 185 households and 185 physical houses.

The 1961 census recorded Garhi Jafar as comprising 1 hamlet, with a total population of 739 people (388 male and 351 female), in 115 households and 94 physical houses. The area of the village was given as 418 acres.

== Infrastructure ==
As of 2011, Garhi Jafar had 2 primary schools; it did not have any healthcare facilities. Drinking water was provided by hand pump and tube well/borehole; there were no public toilets. The village did not have a post office or public library; there was at least some access to electricity for all purposes. Streets were made of both kachcha and pakka materials.
