= Daragpur =

Village in Uttar Pradesh, India

- Village
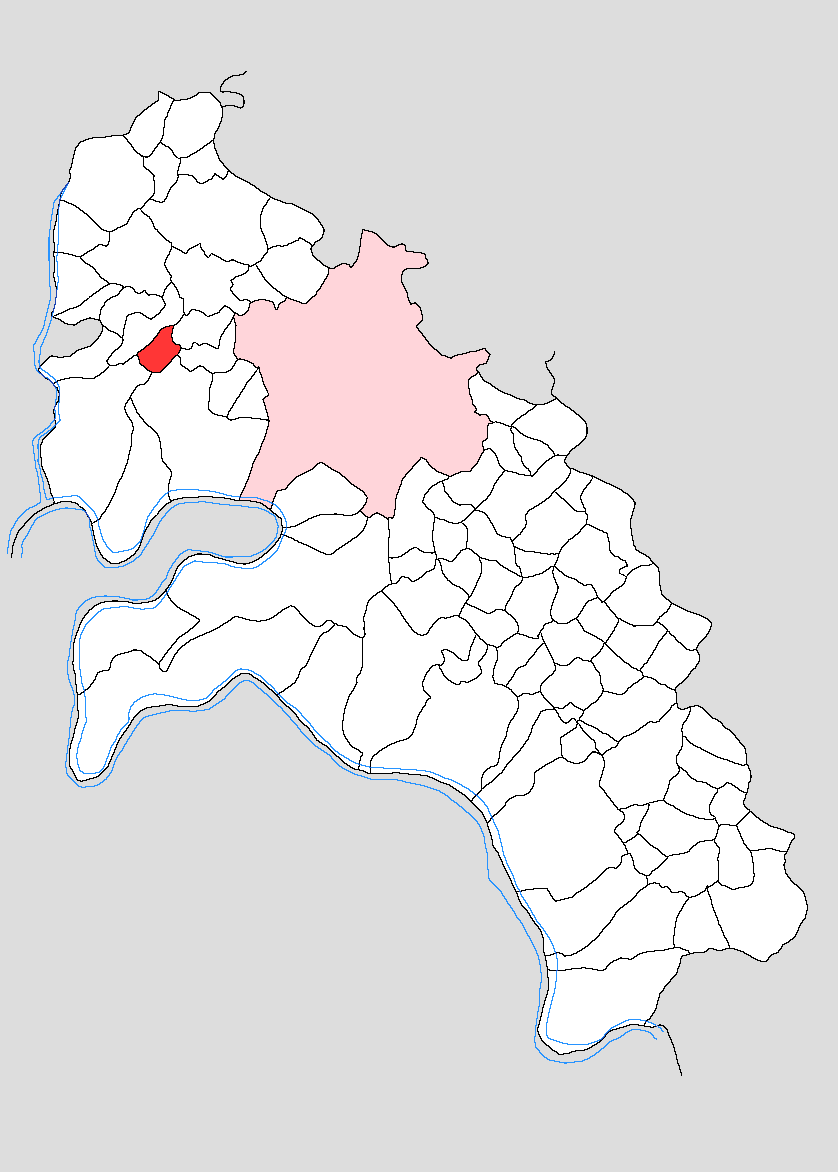
- Map showing Daragpur in Firozabad block

- Location in Uttar Pradesh, India
- Coordinates: 27.16535°N 78.33203°E
- Country: India
- State: Uttar Pradesh
- District: Firozabad
- Tehsil: Firozabad

Area
  - Total: 0.907 km^{2} (0.350 sq mi)

Population (2011)
  - Total: 692
  - Density: 763/km^{2} (1,980/sq mi)
- Time zone: UTC+5:30 (IST)
- PIN: 283203

Daragpur (Daragpur) is a village in Firozabad block of Firozabad district, Uttar Pradesh. It is located west of Firozabad. As of 2011, it had a population of 692, in 126 households.

== Geography ==
Daragpur is located west-northwest of Firozabad, just south of the main line of the Northern Railway. The hamlet of Garhi Daragpur is located immediately to the east of Daragpur. A short distance to the southwest is Kurri Kupa. The surrounding terrain is basically all level farmland.

== Demographics ==
As of 2011, Daragpur had a population of 692, in 126 households. This population was 54.4% male (376) and 45.6% female (316). The 0–6 age group numbered 106 (63 male and 43 female), making up 15.3% of the total population. 19 residents were members of Scheduled Castes, or 2.7% of the total.

The 1981 census recorded Daragpur as having a population of 402 people (220 male and 182 female), in 54 households and 51 physical houses.

The 1961 census recorded Daragpur as comprising 1 hamlet, with a total population of 272 people (141 male and 131 female), in 43 households and 35 physical houses. The area of the village was given as 225 acres.

== Infrastructure ==
As of 2011, Daragpur had 1 primary school; it did not have any healthcare facilities. Drinking water was provided by hand pump; there were no public toilets. The village did not have a post office or public library; there was at least some access to electricity for all purposes. Streets were made of both kachcha and pakka materials.
