= Kurri Kupa =

Village in Uttar Pradesh, India

- Village
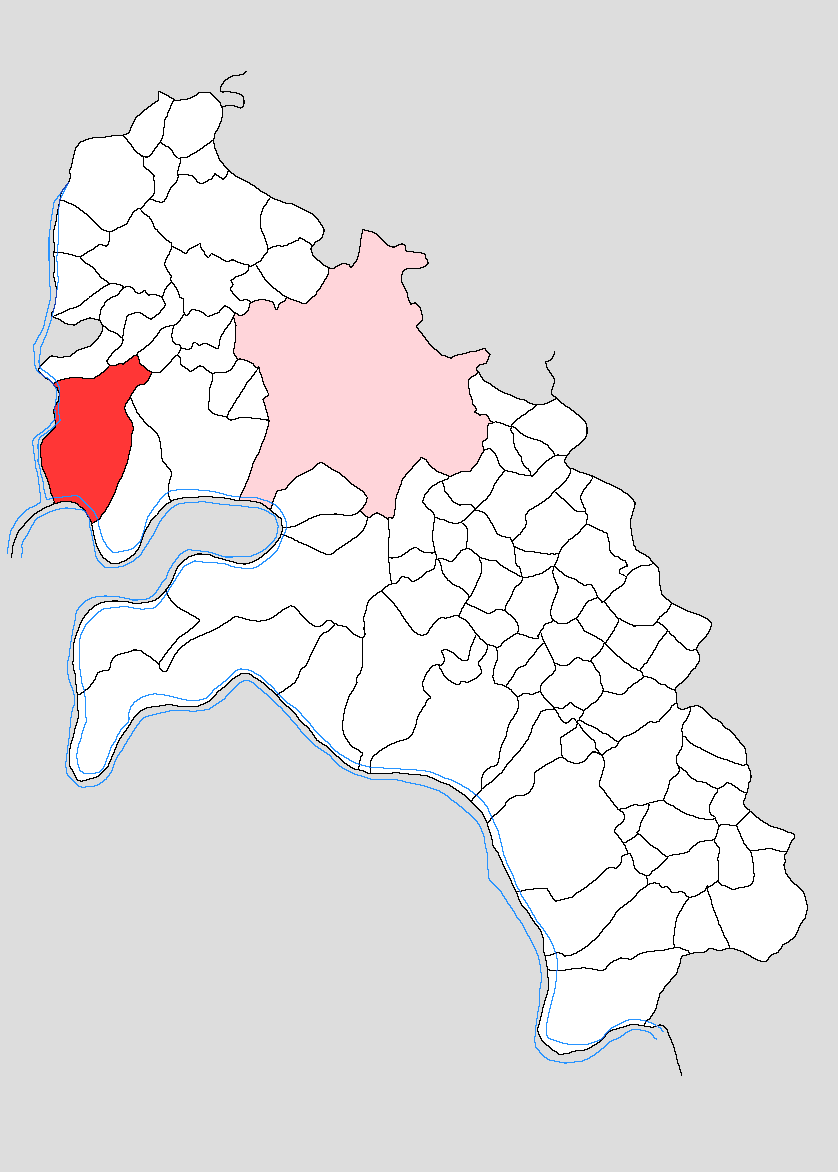
- Map showing Kurri Kupa in Firozabad block

- Location in Uttar Pradesh, India
- Coordinates: 27.1445°N 78.3081°E
- Country: India
- State: Uttar Pradesh
- District: Firozabad
- Tehsil: Firozabad

Area
  - Total: 8.811 km^{2} (3.402 sq mi)

Population (2011)
  - Total: 7,995
  - Density: 907.4/km^{2} (2,350/sq mi)
- Time zone: UTC+5:30 (IST)

Kurri Kupa (Kurrī Kūpā) is a large village in Firozabad block of the Firozabad district, Uttar Pradesh. It technically consists of two distinct settlements, Kurri and Kupa, which are located close together and administered together as a single gram panchayat. As of 2011, it had a population of 7,995, in 1,200 households.

== Geography ==
Kurri and Kupa are the names of two distinct, but close together, settlements: Kurri is to the southeast and Kupa is to the northwest. They are located west of Firozabad, a bit south of the main line of the Northern Railway. Two nearby villages on the south side of the tracks are Daragpur, just to the northeast of Kurri and Kupa; and Laturra, which is to the northwest.

== Demographics ==
As of 2011, Kurri Kupa had a population of 7,995, in 1,200 households. This population was 53.7% male (4,296) and 46.3% female (3,699). The 0–6 age group numbered 1,526 (811 male and 715 female), making up 19.1% of the total population. 811 residents were members of Scheduled Castes, or 10.1% of the total.

The 1981 census recorded Kurri Kupa (spelled "Kurri Kuppa" in English, but "Kurri Kupa" in Hindi) as having a population of 3,969 people (2,167 male and 1,802 female), in 579 households and 577 physical houses.

The 1961 census recorded Kurri Kupa as comprising 5 hamlets, with a total population of 2,624 people (1,391 male and 1,233 female), in 435 households and 361 physical houses. The area of the village was given as 2,188 acres and it had a post office and medical practitioner at that point.

== Administration ==
Kurri Kupa is administered as a gram panchayat under Firozabad district.

== Infrastructure ==
As of 2011, Kurri Kupa had 3 primary schools and 1 primary health centre. Drinking water was provided by hand pump and tube well/bore well; there were no public toilets. The village had a sub post office but no public library; there was at least some access to electricity for all purposes. Streets were made of both kachcha and pakka materials.
