= Rudau Paharpur =

Village in Uttar Pradesh, India

- Village
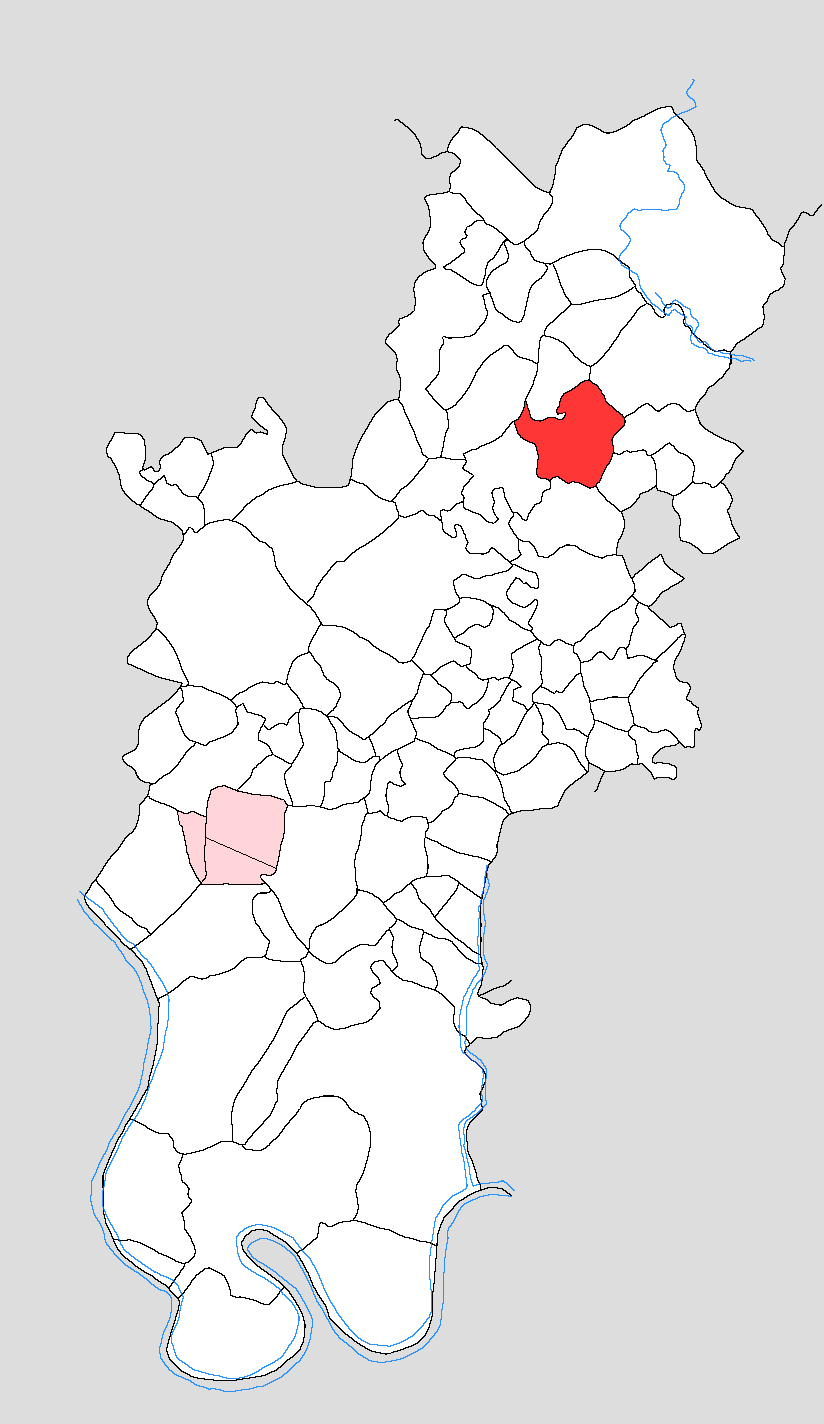
- Map showing Rudau Paharpur in Tundla block

- Location in Uttar Pradesh, India
- Coordinates: 27.31246°N 78.32395°E
- Country: India
- State: Uttar Pradesh
- District: Firozabad
- Tehsil: Tundla

Area
  - Total: 5.161 km^{2} (1.993 sq mi)

Population (2011)
  - Total: 9,268
  - Density: 1,796/km^{2} (4,651/sq mi)
- Time zone: UTC+5:30 (IST)
- PIN: 283204

Rudau Paharpur (Rudaū Pahāṛpur) is a village in Tundla block of Firozabad district, Uttar Pradesh. As of 2011, it has a population of 9,268, in 1,454 households.

== Demographics ==
As of 2011, Rudau Paharpur had a population of 9,268, in 1,454 households. This population was 53.6% male (4,971) and 46.4% female (4,297). The 0-6 age group numbered 1,407 (726 male and 681 female), making up 15.2% of the total population. 3,416 residents were members of Scheduled Castes, or 36.9% of the total.

The 1981 census recorded Rudau Paharpur (as "Rudhau Paharpur") as having a population of 4,683 people (2,612 male and 2,071 female), in 703 households and 690 physical houses. It was then counted as part of Kotla block.

The 1961 census recorded Rudau Paharpur as comprising 5 hamlets, with a total population of 1,623 people (888 male and 735 female), in 252 households and 209 physical houses. The area of the village was given as 899 acres and it had a medical practitioner at that point. It was then counted as part of Kotla block.

== Infrastructure ==
As of 2011, Rudau Paharpur had 3 primary schools and 1 veterinary hospital but no dedicated healthcare facilities for humans. Drinking water was provided by tap and hand pump; there were no public toilets. The village had a sub post office but no public library; there was at least some access to electricity for all purposes. Streets were made of both kachcha and pakka materials.
