= Sikandarpur Kotla =

Village in Uttar Pradesh, India

- Village
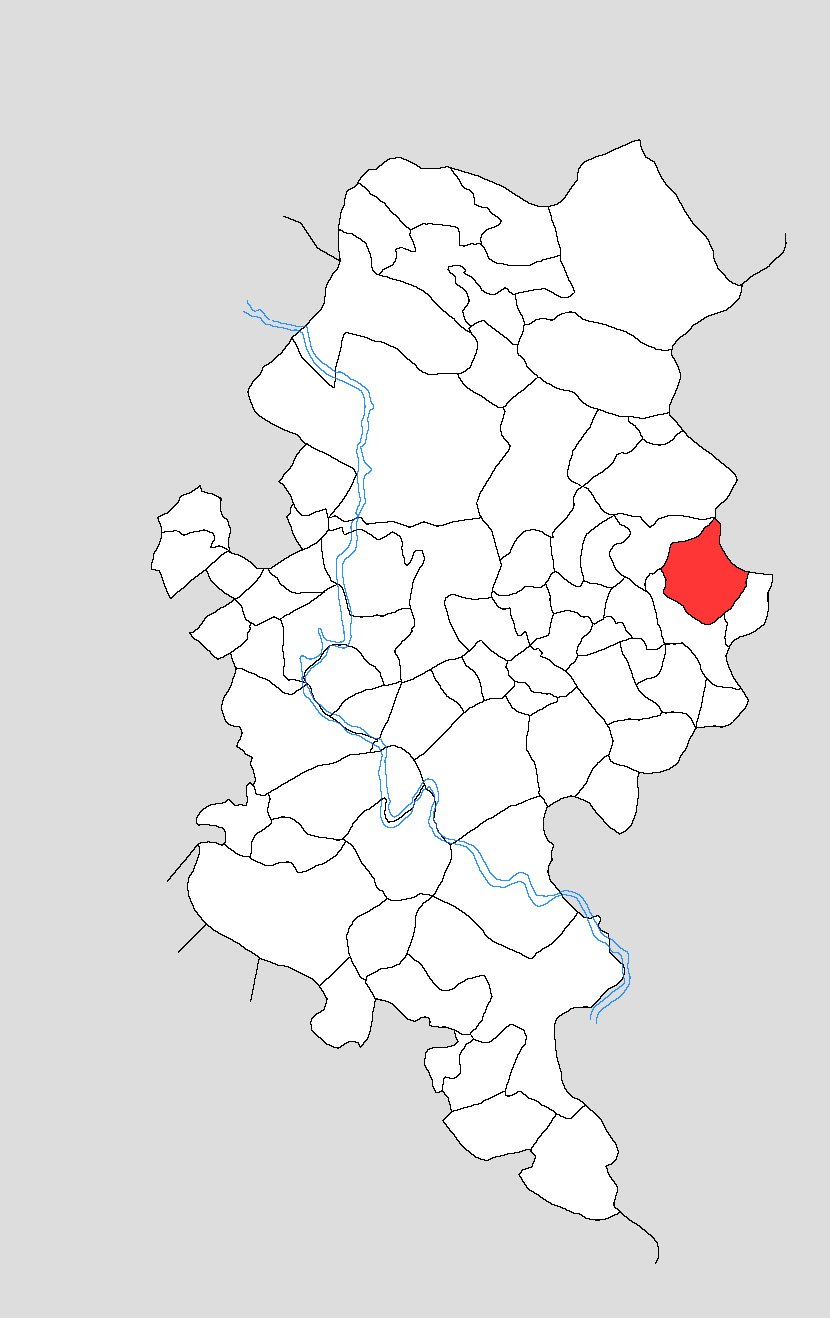
- Map showing Sikandarpur Kotla in Kotla block

- Location in Uttar Pradesh, India
- Coordinates: 27.28064°N 78.46515°E
- Country: India
- State: Uttar Pradesh
- District: Firozabad
- Tehsil: Firozabad

Area
  - Total: 3.504 km^{2} (1.353 sq mi)

Population (2011)
  - Total: 1,452
  - Density: 414.4/km^{2} (1,073/sq mi)
- Time zone: UTC+5:30 (IST)
- PIN: 283203

Sikandarpur Kotla (Sikandarpur Koṭlā) is a village in Kotla block of Firozabad district, Uttar Pradesh. As of 2011, it has a population of 1,452, in 248 households.

== Demographics ==
As of 2011, Sikandarpur Kotla had a population of 1,452, in 248 households. This population was 56.0% male (813) and 44.0% female (639). The 0-6 age group numbered 214 (117 male and 97 female), making up 14.7% of the total population. 790 residents were members of Scheduled Castes, or 54.4% of the total.

The 1981 census recorded Sikandarpur Kotla as having a population of 689 people (383 male and 306 female), in 113 households and 100 physical houses.

The 1961 census recorded Sikandarpur Kotla as comprising 3 hamlets, with a total population of 519 people (285 male and 234 female), in 91 households and 81 physical houses. The area of the village was given as 900 acres and it had a medical practitioner at that point.

== Infrastructure ==
As of 2011, Sikandarpur Kotla had 1 primary school; it did not have any healthcare facilities. Drinking water was provided by hand pump and tube well/borehole; there were no public toilets. The village did not have a post office or public library; there was at least some access to electricity for all purposes. Streets were made of both kachcha and pakka materials.
