= Sukhmalpur Nizamabad =

- Census town
- Location within Uttar Pradesh Location within India
- Coordinates: 27.174°N 78.403°E
- Country: India
- State: Uttar Pradesh
- District: Firozabad

Population (2001)
  - Total: 35,327

Languages
  - Official: Hindi
- Time zone: UTC+5:30 (IST)

Sukhmalpur Nizamabad is a census town in Firozabad district in the Indian state of Uttar Pradesh.

== Demographics ==
As of 2001 India census, Sukhmalpur Nizamabad had a population of 35,327. Males constitute 54% of the population and females 46%. Sukhmalpur Nizamabad has an average literacy rate of 57%, lower than the national average of 59.5%: male literacy is 65%, and female literacy is 46%. In Sukhmalpur Nizamabad, 20% of the population is under 6 years of age.
