= Nagla Radhe =

Village in Uttar Pradesh, India

- Village
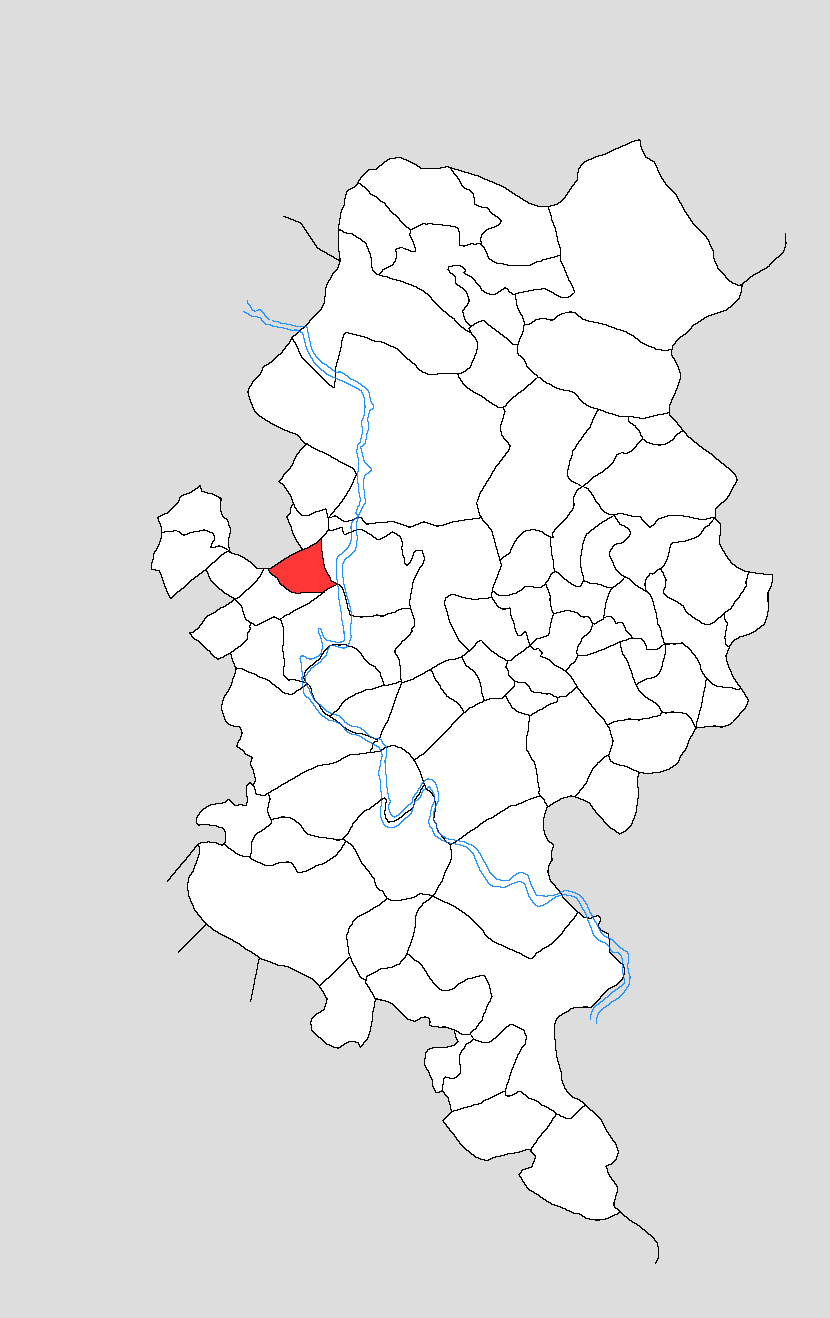
- Map showing Nagla Radhe in Kotla block

- Location in Uttar Pradesh, India
- Coordinates: 27.28786°N 78.37753°E
- Country: India
- State: Uttar Pradesh
- District: Firozabad
- Tehsil: Firozabad

Area
  - Total: 1.061 km^{2} (0.410 sq mi)

Population (2011)
  - Total: 973
  - Density: 917/km^{2} (2,380/sq mi)
- Time zone: UTC+5:30 (IST)

Nagla Radhe (Naglā Rādhe) is a village in Kotla block of Firozabad district, Uttar Pradesh, India. As of 2011, it had a population of 973, in 158 households.

== Demographics ==
As of 2011, Nagla Radhe had a population of 973, in 158 households. This population was 53.8% male (523) and 46.2% female (450). The 0-6 age group numbered 173 (105 male and 68 female), making up 17.8% of the total population. 7 residents were members of Scheduled Castes, or 0.7% of the total.

The 1981 census recorded Nagla Radhe (as "Nagla Radhey") as having a population of 433 people (234 male and 199 female), in 72 households and 71 physical houses.

The 1961 census recorded Nagla Radhe (as "Nagla Radhey") as comprising 1 hamlet, with a total population of 249 people (133 male and 116 female), in 35 households and 26 physical houses. The area of the village was given as 269 acres.

== Infrastructure ==
As of 2011, Nagla Radhe had 1 primary school; it did not have any healthcare facilities. Drinking water was provided by hand pump and tube well/borehole; there were no public toilets. The village did not have a post office or public library; there was at least some access to electricity for residential and agricultural (but not commercial) purposes. Streets were made of pakka materials.
