= Lalgarhi, Tundla =

Village in Uttar Pradesh, India

Lalgarhi
- Village
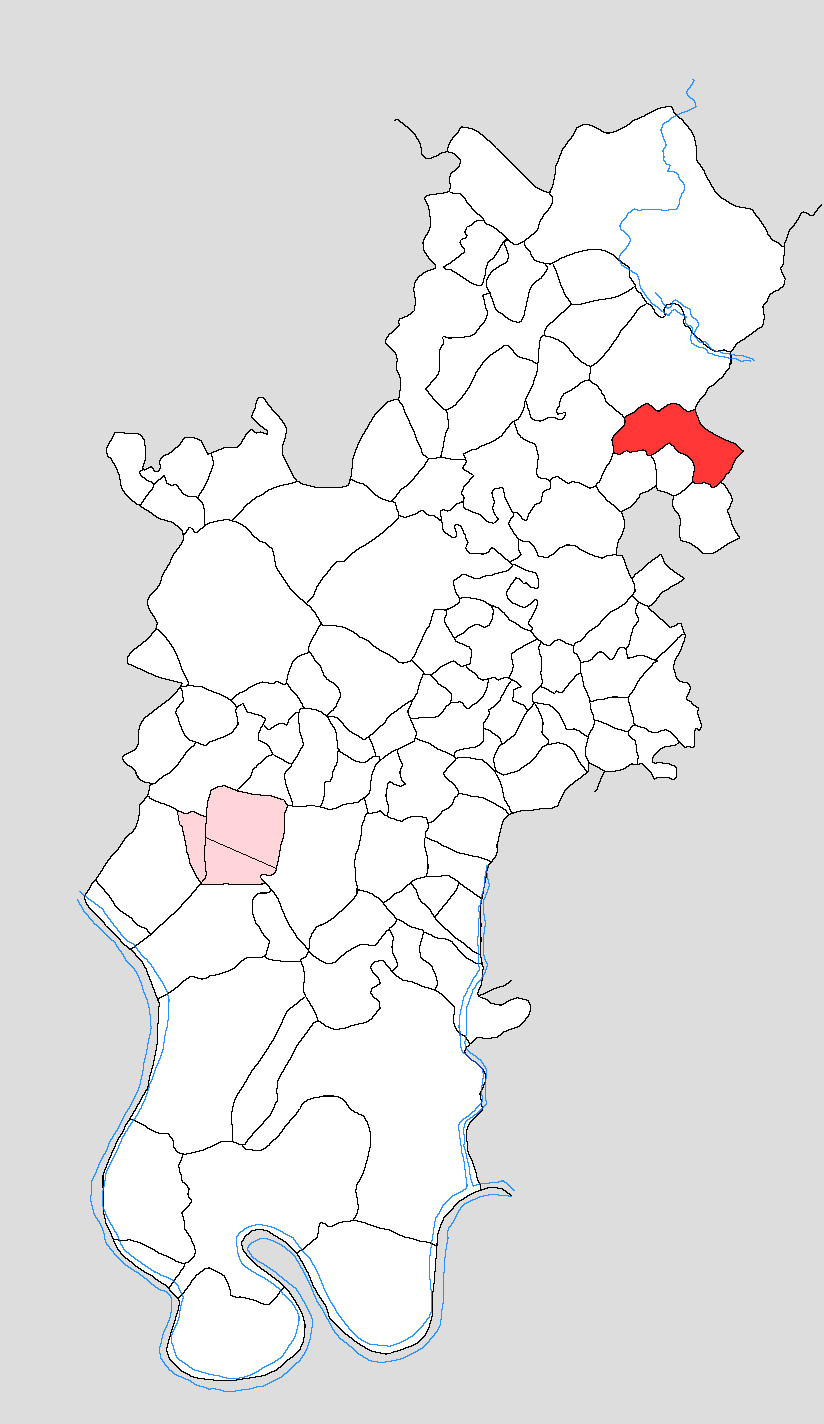
- Map showing Lalgarhi in Tundla block

- Location in Uttar Pradesh, India
- Coordinates: 27.30941°N 78.37386°E
- Country: India
- State: Uttar Pradesh
- District: Firozabad
- Tehsil: Tundla

Area
  - Total: 1.59 km^{2} (0.61 sq mi)

Population (2011)
  - Total: 936
  - Density: 589/km^{2} (1,520/sq mi)
- Time zone: UTC+5:30 (IST)
- PIN: 283204

Lalgarhi (Lālgaṛhī) is a village in Tundla block of Firozabad district, Uttar Pradesh. As of 2011, it has a population of 936, in 145 households.

== Demographics ==
As of 2011, Lalgarhi had a population of 936, in 145 households. This population was 52.2% male (489) and 47.8% female (447). The 0-6 age group numbered 133 (69 male and 64 female), making up 14.2% of the total population. 416 residents were members of Scheduled Castes, or 44.4% of the total.

The 1981 census recorded Lalgarhi as having a population of 472 people (240 male and 232 female), in 81 households and 80 physical houses. It was then counted as part of Kotla block.

The 1961 census recorded Lalgarhi (as two words, "Lal Garhi") as comprising 1 hamlet, with a total population of 296 people (142 male and 154 female), in 45 households and 35 physical houses. The area of the village was given as 393 acres and it was then counted as part of Kotla block.

== Infrastructure ==
As of 2011, Lalgarhi had 1 primary school; it did not have any healthcare facilities. Drinking water was provided by hand pump; there were no public toilets. The village did not have a post office or public library; there was at least some access to electricity for all purposes. Streets were made of both kachcha and pakka materials.
