= Gondai, Firozabad =

Village in Uttar Pradesh, India

Gondai
- Village
- Location in Uttar Pradesh, India
- Coordinates: 27.27107°N 78.3801°E
- Country: India
- State: Uttar Pradesh
- District: Firozabad
- Tehsil: Firozabad

Area
  - Total: 2.46 km^{2} (0.95 sq mi)

Population (2011)
  - Total: 1,450
  - Density: 589/km^{2} (1,530/sq mi)
- Time zone: UTC+5:30 (IST)
- PIN: 283204

Gondai (Gondaī) is a village in Kotla block of Firozabad district, Uttar Pradesh, India. As of 2011, it had a population of 1,450, in 281 households.

== Demographics ==
As of 2011, Gondai had a population of 1,450, in 281 households. This population was 52.7% male (764) and 47.3% female (686). The 0-6 age group numbered 202 (110 male and 92 female), making up 13.9% of the total population. 275 residents were members of Scheduled Castes, or 19.0% of the total.

The 1981 census recorded Gondai (spelled "Gondhi" in English but "Gondai" in Hindi) as having a population of 810 people (431 male and 379 female), in 139 households and 135 physical houses.

The 1961 census recorded Gondai as comprising 1 hamlet, with a total population of 581 people (302 male and 279 female), in 110 households and 73 physical houses. The area of the village was given as 611 acres and it had a post office at that point.

== Infrastructure ==
As of 2011, Gondai had 1 primary school; it did not have any healthcare facilities. Drinking water was provided by hand pump and tube well/borehole; there were no public toilets. The village did not have a post office or public library; there was at least some access to electricity for residential and agricultural (but not commercial) purposes. Streets were made of pakka materials.
