= Dauri, Uttar Pradesh =

Village in Uttar Pradesh, India

Dauri
- Village
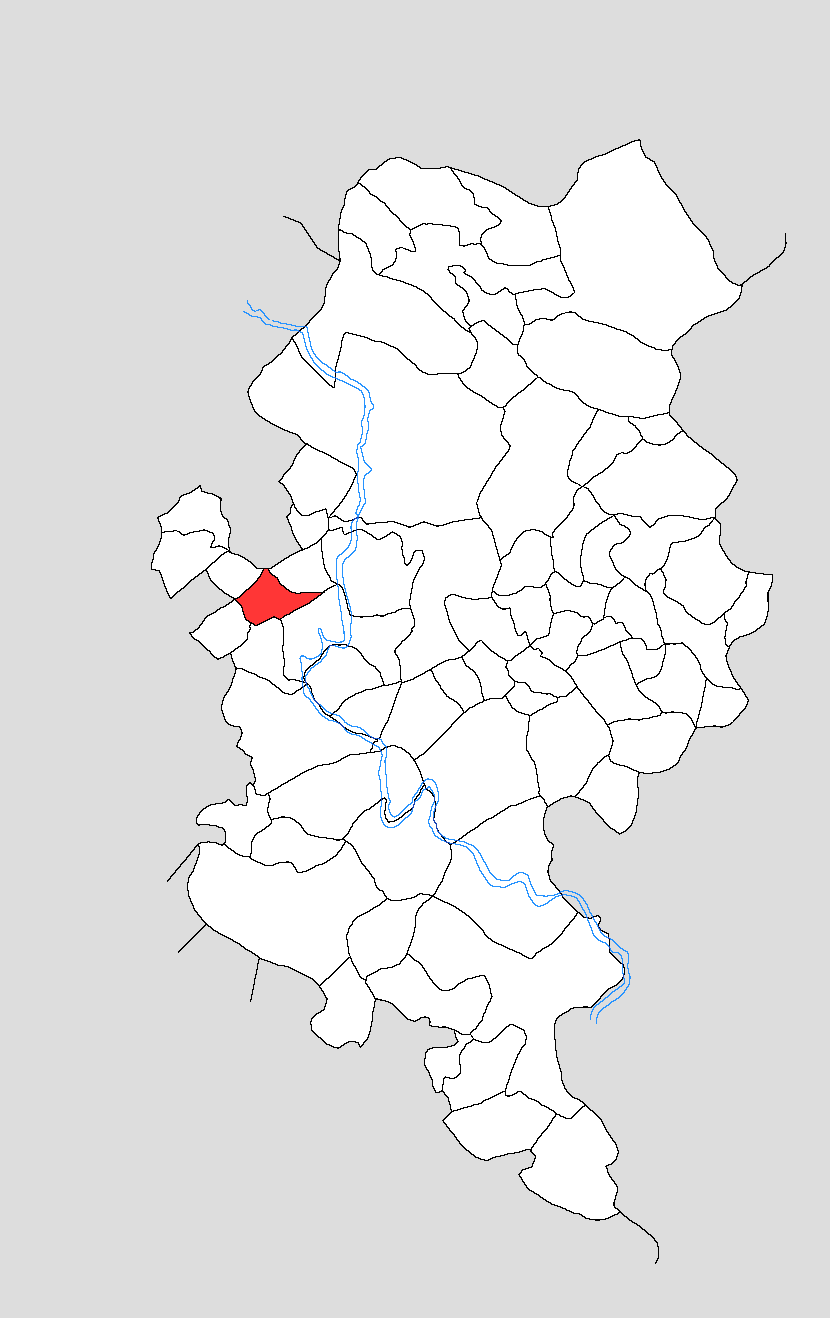
- Map showing Dauri in Kotla block

- Location in Uttar Pradesh, India
- Coordinates: 27.28476°N 78.3626°E
- Country: India
- State: Uttar Pradesh
- District: Firozabad
- Tehsil: Firozabad

Area
  - Total: 0.805 km^{2} (0.311 sq mi)

Population (2011)
  - Total: 1,395
  - Density: 1,730/km^{2} (4,490/sq mi)
- Time zone: UTC+5:30 (IST)

Dauri (Ḍorī) is a village in Kotla block of Firozabad district, Uttar Pradesh. As of 2011, it had a population of 1,395, in 273 households.

== Demographics ==
As of 2011, Dauri had a population of 1,395, in 273 households. This population was 52.4% male (731) and 47.6% female (664). The 0-6 age group numbered 221 (112 male and 109 female), making up 15.8% of the total population. 475 residents were members of Scheduled Castes, or 34.1% of the total.

The 1981 census recorded Dauri (as "Dori") as having a population of 610 people (339 male and 271 female), in 95 households and 89 physical houses.

The 1961 census recorded Dauri (as "Dori") as comprising 1 hamlet, with a total population of 369 people (214 male and 155 female), in 57 households and 34 physical houses. The area of the village was given as 199 acres.

== Infrastructure ==
As of 2011, Dauri had 1 primary school; it did not have any healthcare facilities. Drinking water was provided by hand pump and tube well/borehole; there were no public toilets. The village did not have a post office or public library; there was at least some access to electricity for all purposes. Streets were made of pakka materials.
