= Nagla Balia =

Village in Uttar Pradesh, India

- Village
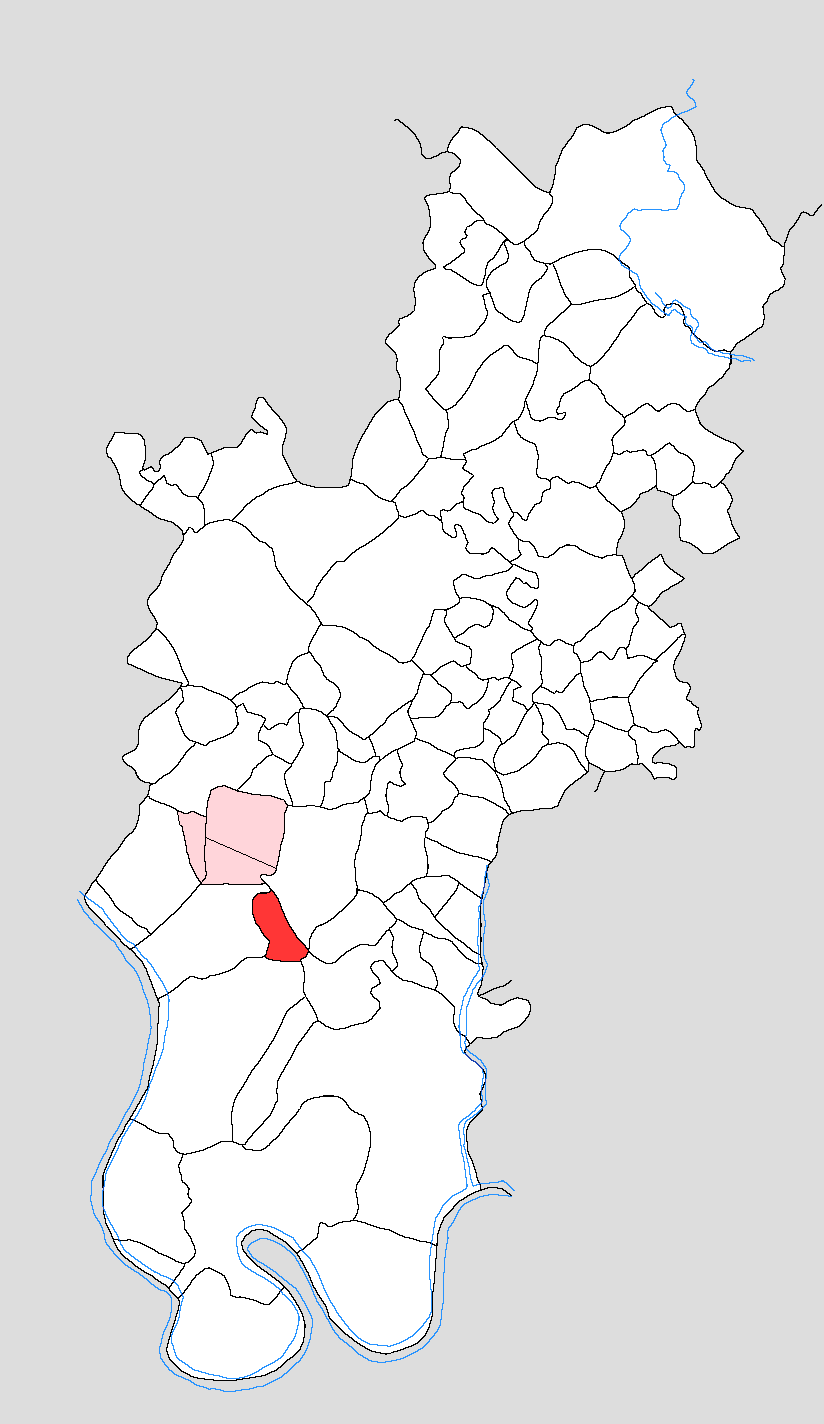
- Map showing Nagla Balia in Tundla block

- Location in Uttar Pradesh, India
- Coordinates: 27.19032°N 78.24605°E
- Country: India
- State: Uttar Pradesh
- District: Firozabad
- Tehsil: Tundla

Area
  - Total: 1.699 km^{2} (0.656 sq mi)

Population (2011)
  - Total: 1,348
  - Density: 793.4/km^{2} (2,055/sq mi)
- Time zone: UTC+5:30 (IST)
- PIN: 283204

Nagla Balia (Naglā Baliyā) is a village in Tundla block of Firozabad district, Uttar Pradesh, India. As of 2011, it had a population of 1,348, in 231 households.

== Demographics ==
As of 2011, Nagla Balia had a population of 1,348, in 231 households. This population was 54.7% male (738) and 45.3% female (610). The 0-6 age group numbered 219 (123 male and 96 female), making up 16.2% of the total population. 285 residents were members of Scheduled Castes, or 21.1% of the total.

The 1981 census recorded Nagla Balia as having a population of 845 people (470 male and 375 female), in 149 households and 149 physical houses.

The 1961 census recorded Nagla Balia as comprising 2 hamlets, with a total population of 493 people (251 male and 242 female), in 80 households and 47 physical houses. The area of the village was given as 420 acres.

== Infrastructure ==
As of 2011, Nagla Balia had 1 primary school; it did not have any healthcare facilities. Drinking water was provided by tap, hand pump, and tube well/borehole; there were no public toilets. The village had a public library but no post office; there was at least some access to electricity for all purposes. Streets were made of kachcha materials.
