= Alawalpur, Firozabad =

Village in Uttar Pradesh, India

Alawalpur
- Village
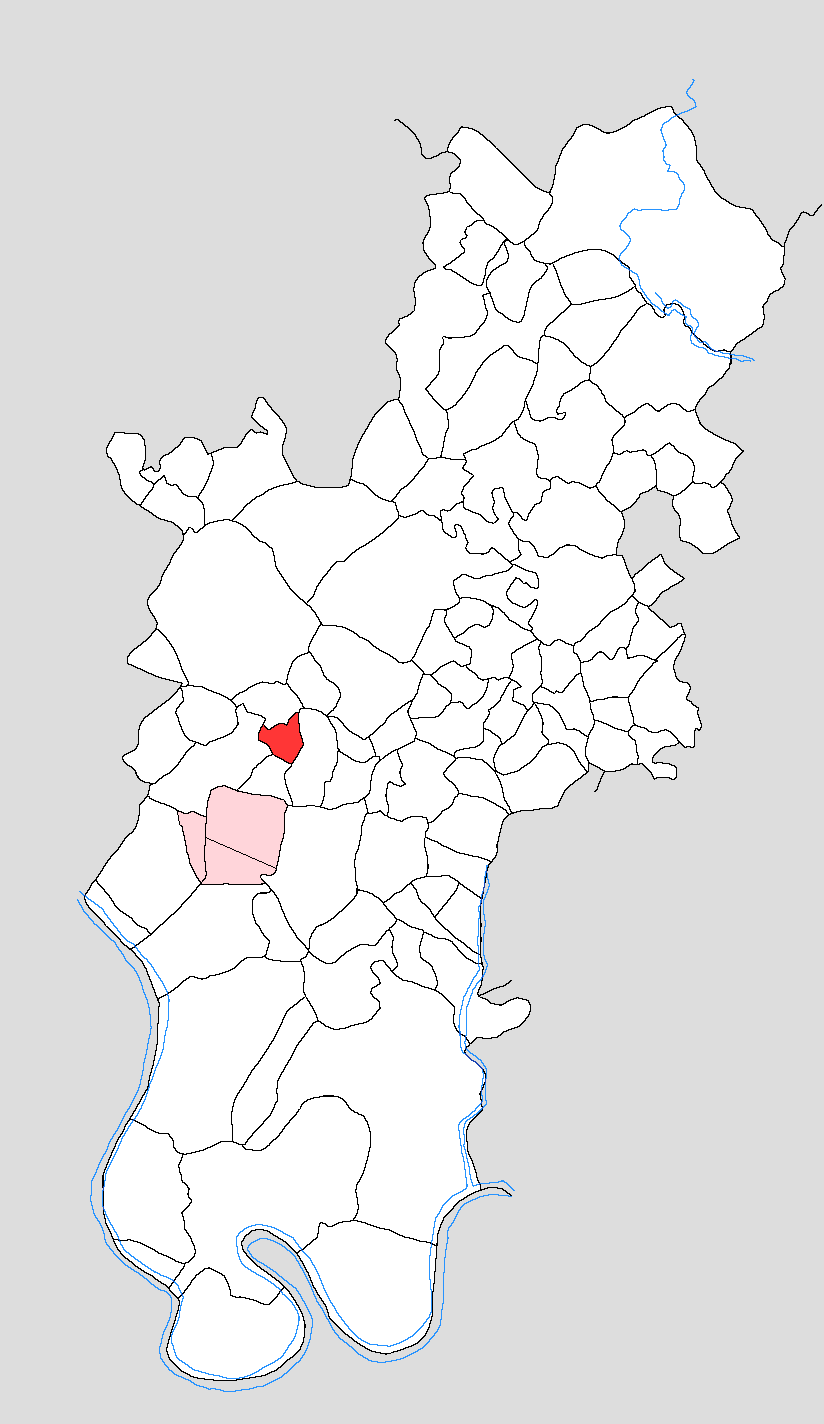
- Map showing Alawalpur in Tundla block

- Location in Uttar Pradesh, India
- Coordinates: 27.23608°N 78.24409°E
- Country: India
- State: Uttar Pradesh
- District: Firozabad
- Tehsil: Tundla

Area
  - Total: 1.056 km^{2} (0.408 sq mi)

Population (2011)
  - Total: 660
  - Density: 630/km^{2} (1,600/sq mi)
- Time zone: UTC+5:30 (IST)
- PIN: 283204

Alawalpur (Alāwalpur) is a village in Tundla block of Firozabad district, Uttar Pradesh. As of 2011, it has a population of 660, in 83 households.

== Demographics ==
As of 2011, Alawalpur had a population of 660, in 83 households. This population was 54.8% male (362) and 45.2% female (298). The 0-6 age group numbered 99 (52 male and 47 female), making up 15% of the total population. 26 residents were members of Scheduled Castes, or 3.9% of the total.

The 1981 census recorded Alawalpur's population at 332 people (170 male and 162 female), in 56 households and 56 physical houses.

The 1961 census recorded Alawalpur as comprising 1 hamlet, with a total population of 191 people (103 male and 88 female), in 35 households and 28 physical houses. The area of the village was given as 260 acres.

== Infrastructure ==
As of 2011, Alawalpur had 1 primary school; it did not have any healthcare facilities. Drinking water was provided by tap and hand pump; there were no public toilets. The village did not have a post office or public library; there was at least some access to electricity for all purposes. Streets were made of pakka materials.
