= Khera Langar =

Village in Uttar Pradesh, India

- Village
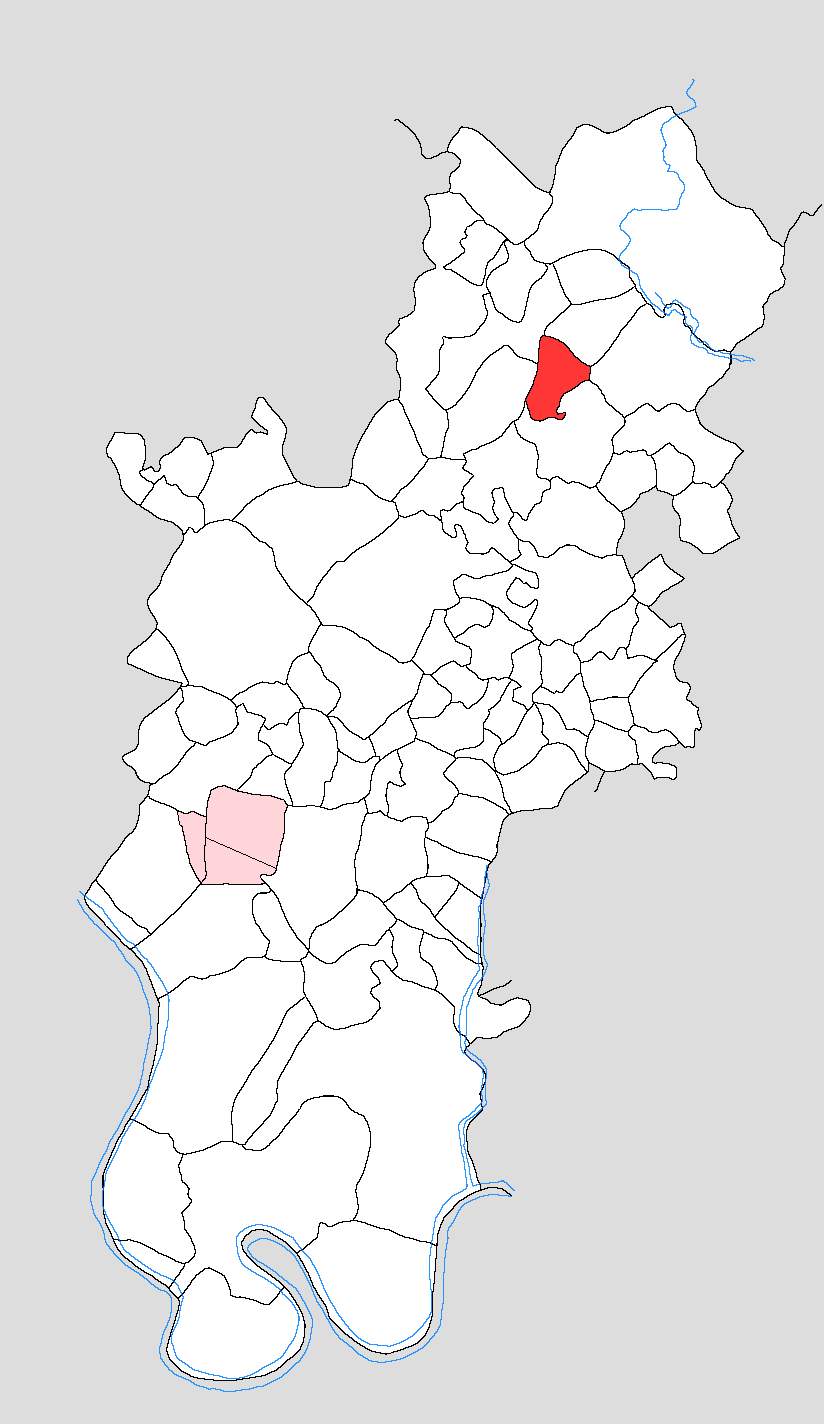
- Map showing Khera Langar in Tundla block

- Location in Uttar Pradesh, India
- Coordinates: 27.32331°N 78.32212°E
- Country: India
- State: Uttar Pradesh
- District: Firozabad
- Tehsil: Tundla

Area
  - Total: 1.925 km^{2} (0.743 sq mi)

Population (2011)
  - Total: 1,593
  - Density: 827.5/km^{2} (2,143/sq mi)
- Time zone: UTC+5:30 (IST)
- PIN: 283204

Khera Langar (Kherā Laṅgar) is a village in Tundla block of Firozabad district, Uttar Pradesh. As of 2011, it has a population of 1,593, in 231 households.

== Demographics ==
As of 2011, Khera Langar had a population of 1,593, in 231 households. This population was 54.7% male (871) and 45.3% female (722). The 0-6 age group numbered 270 (146 male and 124 female), making up 16.9% of the total population. 928 residents were members of Scheduled Castes, or 58.25% of the total.

The 1981 census recorded Khera Langar as having a population of 797 people (441 male and 356 female), in 144 households and 140 physical houses. It was then counted as part of Kotla block.

The 1961 census recorded Khera Langar (as "Khera Langer") as comprising 2 hamlets, with a total population of 567 people (313 male and 254 female), in 95 households and 69 physical houses. The area of the village was given as 455 acres and it was then counted as part of Kotla block.

== Infrastructure ==
As of 2011, Khera Langar had 1 primary school; it did not have any healthcare facilities. Drinking water was provided by hand pump; there were no public toilets. The village did not have a post office or public library; there was at least some access to electricity for all purposes. Streets were made of both kachcha and pakka materials.
