= Okhra =

Village in Uttar Pradesh, India

- Village
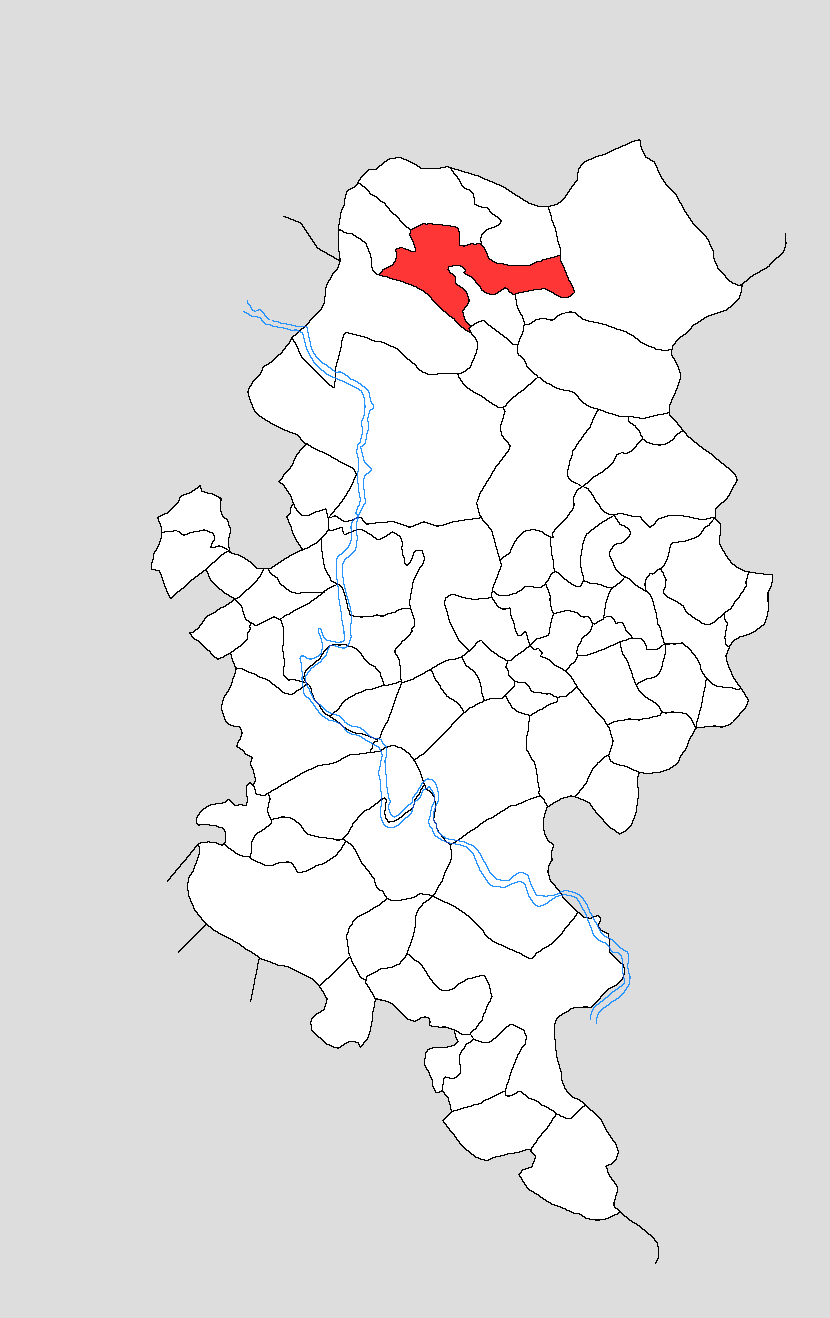
- Map showing Okhra in Kotla block

- Location in Uttar Pradesh, India
- Coordinates: 27.3505°N 78.40998°E
- Country: India
- State: Uttar Pradesh
- District: Firozabad
- Tehsil: Firozabad

Area
  - Total: 3.275 km^{2} (1.264 sq mi)

Population (2011)
  - Total: 2,618
  - Density: 799.4/km^{2} (2,070/sq mi)
- Time zone: UTC+5:30 (IST)

Okhra (Okhrā) is a village in Kotla block of Firozabad district, Uttar Pradesh, India. As of 2011, it had a population of 2,618, in 451 households.

== Demographics ==
As of 2011, Okhra had a population of 2,618, in 451 households. This population was 55.2% male (1,446) and 44.8% female (1,172). The 0-6 age group numbered 365 (217 male and 148 female), making up 13.9% of the total population. 511 residents were members of Scheduled Castes, or 19.5% of the total.

The 1981 census recorded Okhra (as "Okhara") as having a population of 1,958 people (1,103 male and 855 female), in 353 households and 320 physical houses.

The 1961 census recorded Okhra as comprising 2 hamlets, with a total population of 1,590 people (850 male and 740 female), in 296 households and 184 physical houses. The area of the village was given as 802 acres and it had a post office and medical practitioner at that point.

== Infrastructure ==
As of 2011, Okhra had 1 primary school and 1 primary health centre. Drinking water was provided by hand pump and tube well/borehole; there were no public toilets. The village did not have a post office or public library; there was at least some access to electricity for all purposes. Streets were made of both kachcha and pakka materials.
