= Maha Singhpur =

Village in Uttar Pradesh, India

- Village
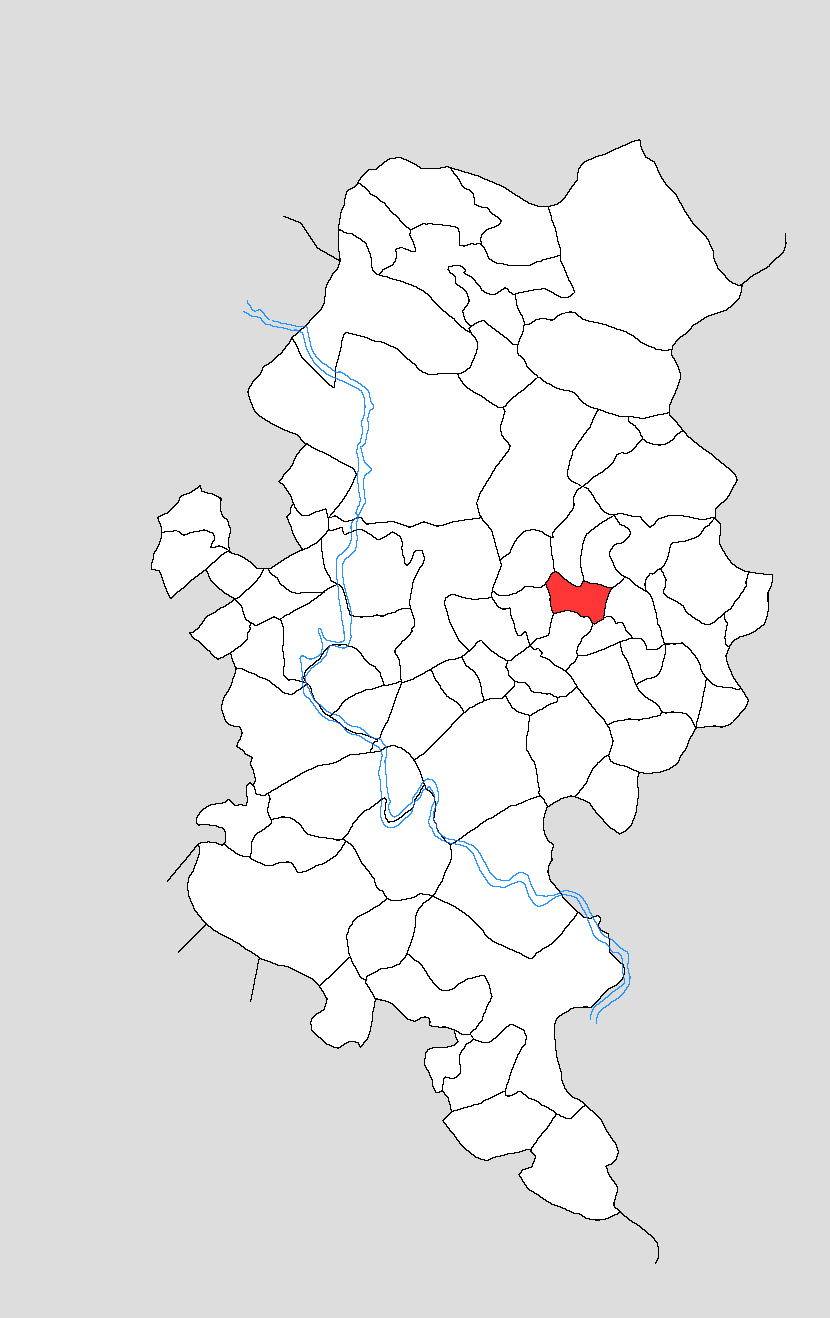
- Map showing Maha Singhpur in Kotla block

- Location in Uttar Pradesh, India
- Coordinates: 27.27839°N 78.44279°E
- Country: India
- State: Uttar Pradesh
- District: Firozabad
- Tehsil: Firozabad

Area
  - Total: 1.024 km^{2} (0.395 sq mi)

Population (2011)
  - Total: 571
  - Density: 558/km^{2} (1,440/sq mi)
- Time zone: UTC+5:30 (IST)

Maha Singhpur (Mahā Siṅghpur) is a village in Kotla block of Firozabad district, Uttar Pradesh. As of 2011, it has a population of 571, in 102 households.

== Demographics ==
As of 2011, Maha Singhpur had a population of 571, in 102 households. This population was 53.9% male (308) and 46.1% female (263). The 0-6 age group numbered 91 (52 male and 39 female), making up 15.9% of the total population. 256 residents were members of Scheduled Castes, or 44.8% of the total.

The 1981 census recorded Maha Singhpur (spelled as one word, "Mahasinghpur") as having a population of 289 people (165 male and 124 female), in 42 households and 42 physical houses.

The 1961 census recorded Maha Singhpur (spelled as one word, "Mahasinghpur") as comprising 1 hamlet, with a total population of 17 people (9 male and 8 female), in 2 households and 2 physical houses. The area of the village was given as 253 acres.

== Infrastructure ==
As of 2011, Maha Singhpur had 1 primary school; it did not have any healthcare facilities. Drinking water was provided by hand pump and tube well/borehole; there were no public toilets. The village did not have a post office or public library; there was at least some access to electricity for all purposes. Streets were made of both kachcha and pakka materials.
