= Nagla Beech, Uttar Pradesh =

Nagla Beech is a village in Firozabad district, Uttar Pradesh, India. It is about 15 km from the Tundla Railway Colony and the Tundla railway junction.

== References and external links ==
- Village Profile
