= Ratauli, Firozabad =

Village in Uttar Pradesh, India

Ratauli
- Village
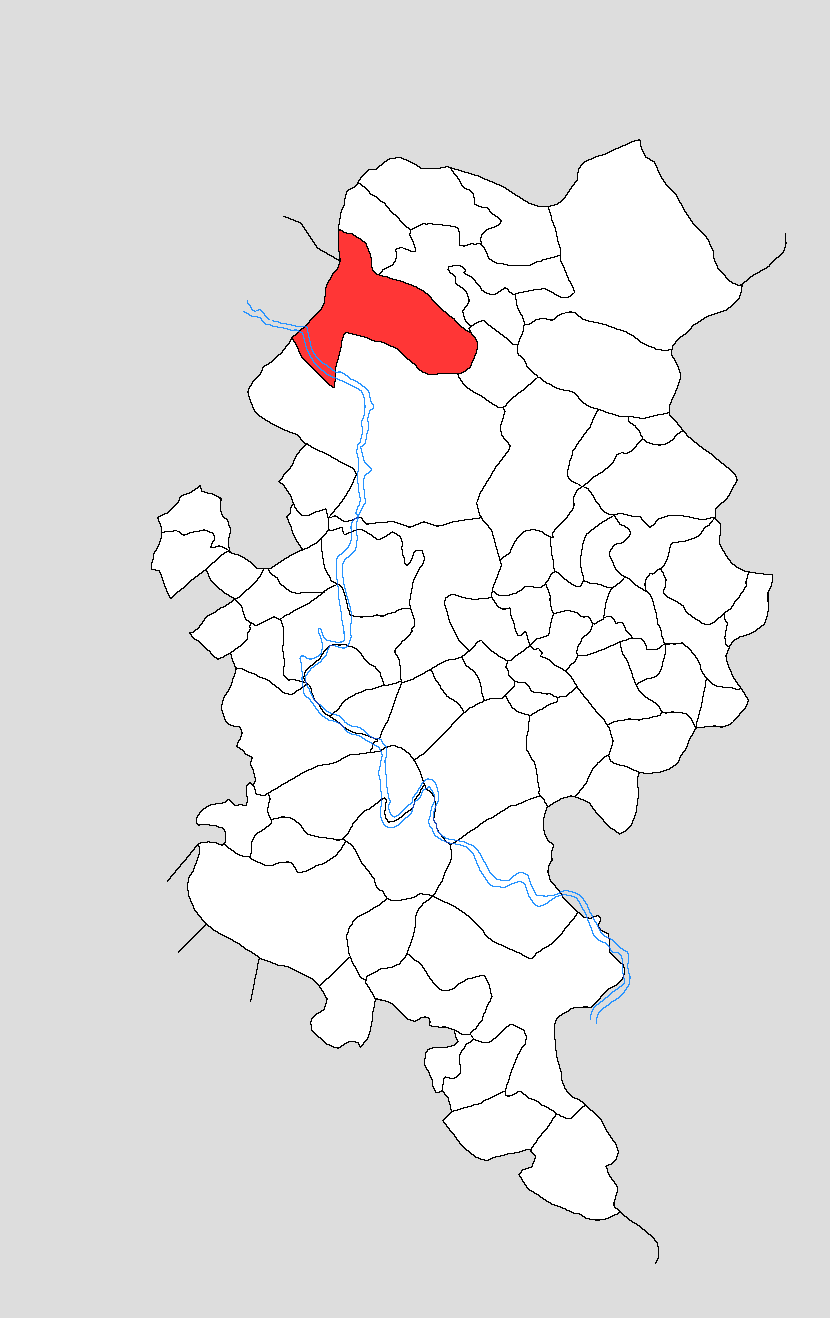
- Map showing Ratauli in Kotla block

- Location in Uttar Pradesh, India
- Coordinates: 27.33464°N 78.4087°E
- Country: India
- State: Uttar Pradesh
- District: Firozabad
- Tehsil: Firozabad

Area
  - Total: 5.11 km^{2} (1.97 sq mi)

Population (2011)
  - Total: 3,079
  - Density: 603/km^{2} (1,560/sq mi)
- Time zone: UTC+5:30 (IST)

Ratauli is a village in Kotla block of Firozabad district, Uttar Pradesh, India. It is located near the source of a small stream called the Sengar. As of 2011, it had a population of 3,079, in 509 households.

== Geography ==
Ratauli is located near the source of a small stream called the Sengar, which flows southeast parallel with the Sirsa river. Although the Sengar is small, it sometimes floods the low-lying plains around Ratauli during the rainy season.

== Demographics ==
As of 2011, Ratauli had a population of 3,079, in 509 households. This population was 53.3% male (1,640) and 46.7% female (1,439). The 0-6 age group numbered 518 (265 male and 253 female), making up 16.8% of the total population. 1,294 residents were members of Scheduled Castes, or 42.0% of the total.

The 1981 census recorded Ratauli as having a population of 1,732 people (954 male and 778 female), in 291 households and 290 physical houses.

The 1961 census recorded Ratauli as comprising 4 hamlets, with a total population of 1,272 people (696 male and 576 female), in 262 households and 156 houses. The area of the village was given as 1,285 acres.

== Infrastructure ==
As of 2011, Ratauli had 1 primary school; it did not have any healthcare facilities. Drinking water was provided by hand pump and tube well/borehole; there were no public toilets. The village did not have a post office or public library; there was at least some access to electricity for all purposes. Streets were made of both kachcha and pakka materials.
