= Jatau =

Village in Uttar Pradesh, India

- Village
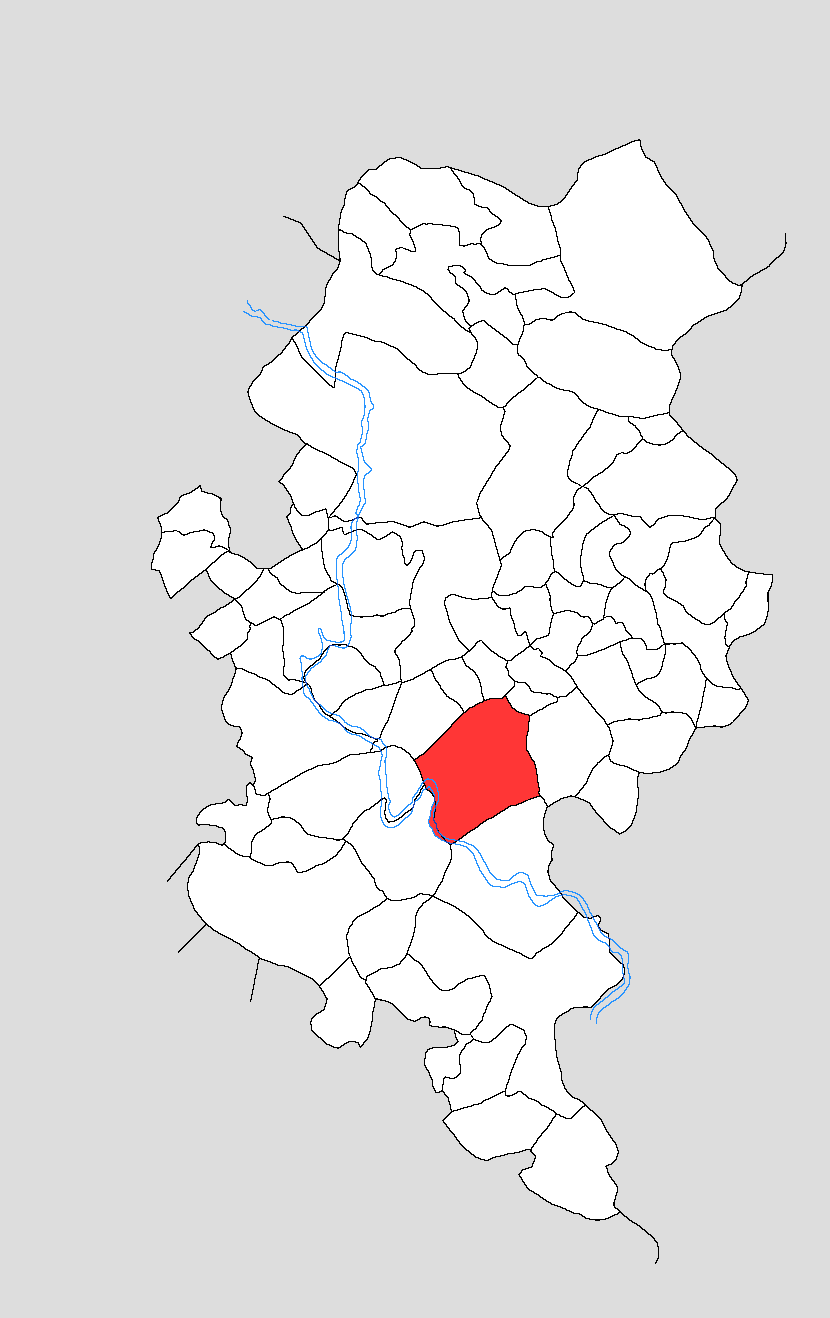
- Map showing Jatau in Kotla block

- Location in Uttar Pradesh, India
- Coordinates: 27.24578°N 78.40995°E
- Country: India
- State: Uttar Pradesh
- District: Firozabad
- Tehsil: Firozabad

Area
  - Total: 6.181 km^{2} (2.386 sq mi)

Population (2011)
  - Total: 5,236
  - Density: 847.1/km^{2} (2,194/sq mi)
- Time zone: UTC+5:30 (IST)
- PIN: 283203

Jatau (Jāṭaū) is a village in Kotla block of Firozabad district, Uttar Pradesh. As of 2011, it had a population of 5,236, in 819 households.

== Demographics ==
As of 2011, Jatau had a population of 5,236, in 819 households. This population was 53.25% male (2,788) and 46.75% female (2,448). The 0-6 age group numbered 819 (442 male and 377 female), making up 15.6% of the total population. 1,687 residents were members of Scheduled Castes, or 32.2% of the total.

The 1981 census recorded Jatau as having a population of 3,023 people (1,606 male and 1,417 female), in 473 households and 468 physical houses.

The 1961 census recorded Jatau as comprising 3 hamlets, with a total population of 2,040 people (1,072 male and 968 female), in 363 households and 244 physical houses. The area of the village was given as 1,523 acres and it had a post office and medical practitioner at that point.

== Infrastructure ==
As of 2011, Jatau had 2 primary schools and 1 community health centre and veterinary hospital. Drinking water was provided by hand pump and tube well/borehole; there were no public toilets. The village had a sub post office but no public library; there was at least some access to electricity for all purposes. Streets were made of both kachcha and pakka materials.
