= Kotki, Uttar Pradesh =

Village in Uttar Pradesh, India

Kotki
- Village
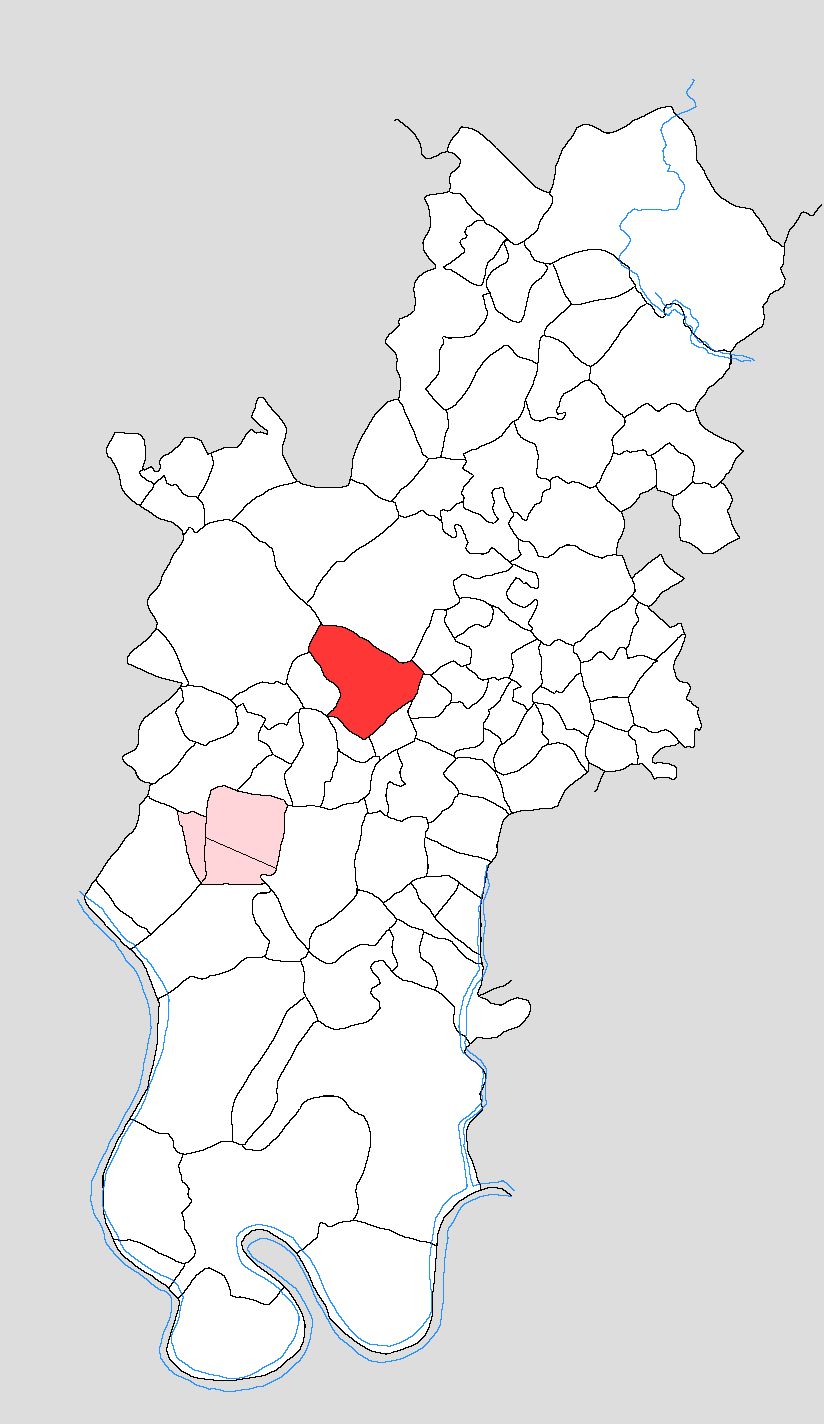
- Map showing Kotki in Tundla block

- Location in Uttar Pradesh, India
- Coordinates: 27.25594°N 78.27043°E
- Country: India
- State: Uttar Pradesh
- District: Firozabad
- Tehsil: Tundla

Area
  - Total: 538.1 km^{2} (207.8 sq mi)

Population (2011)
  - Total: 6,061
  - Density: 11.26/km^{2} (29.17/sq mi)
- Time zone: UTC+5:30 (IST)
- PIN: 283204

Kotki (Koṭkī) is a village in Tundla block of Firozabad district, Uttar Pradesh. As of 2011, it has a population of 6,061, in 977 households.

== Demographics ==
As of 2011, Kotki had a population of 6,061, in 977 households. This population was 54.4% male (3,297) and 45.6% female (2,764). The 0-6 age group numbered 944 (506 male and 438 female), making up 15.6% of the total population. 1,471 residents were members of Scheduled Castes, or 24.3% of the total.

The 1981 census recorded Kotki as having a population of 3,755 people (2,080 male and 1,675 female), in 648 households and 632 physical houses.

The 1961 census recorded Kotki as comprising 5 hamlets, with a total population of 2,816 people (1,493 male and 1,323 female), in 508 households and 418 physical houses. The area of the village was given as 1,358 acres and it had a post office at that point.

== Infrastructure ==
As of 2011, Kotki had 2 primary schools; it did not have any healthcare facilities. Drinking water was provided by tap and hand pump; there were no public toilets. The village had a public library but no post office; there was at least some access to electricity for all purposes. Streets were made of both kachcha and pakka materials.
