= Mahipura =

Village in Uttar Pradesh, India

- Village
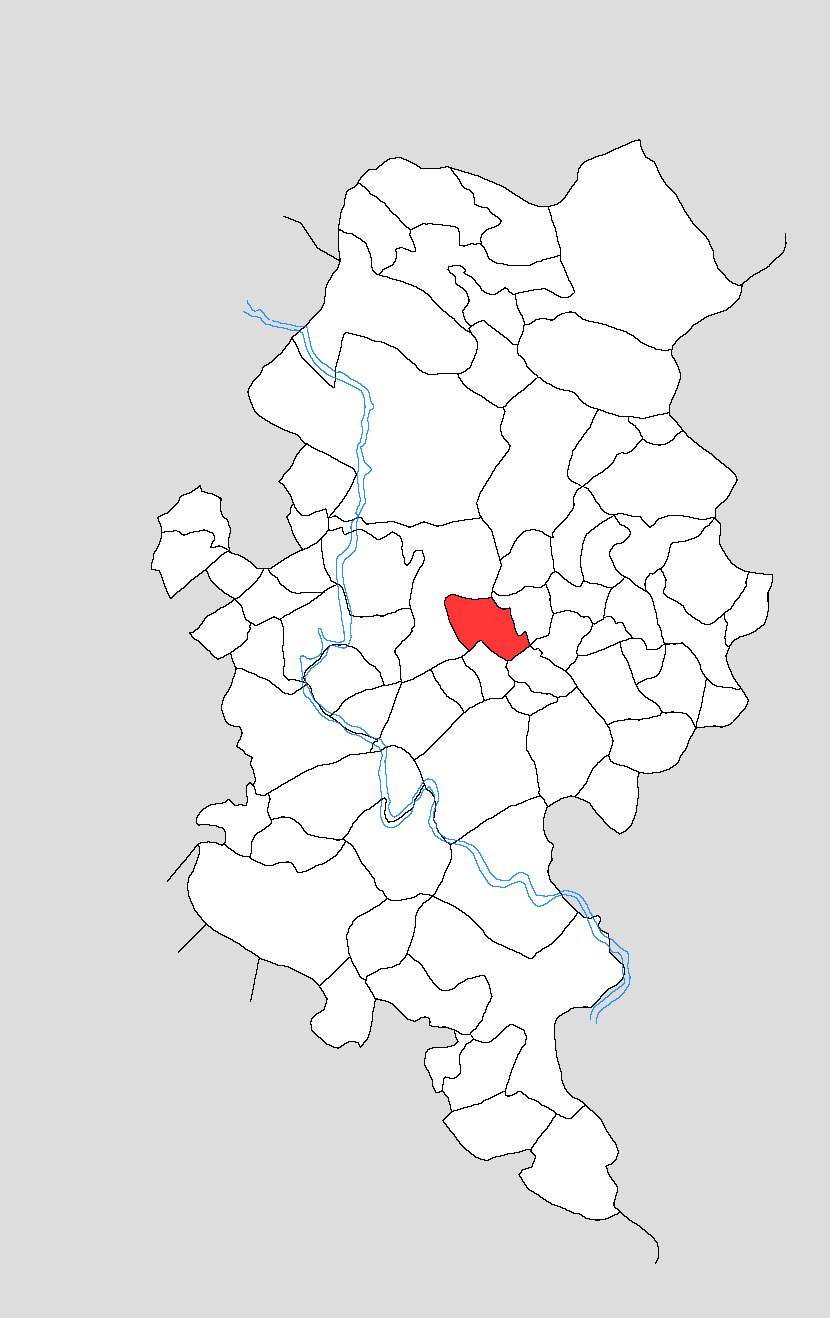
- Map showing Mahipura in Kotla block

- Location in Uttar Pradesh, India
- Coordinates: 27.27107°N 78.42328°E
- Country: India
- State: Uttar Pradesh
- District: Firozabad
- Tehsil: Firozabad

Area
  - Total: 0.883 km^{2} (0.341 sq mi)

Population (2011)
  - Total: 255
  - Density: 289/km^{2} (748/sq mi)
- Time zone: UTC+5:30 (IST)

Mahipura (Mahīpurā) is a village in Kotla block of Firozabad district, Uttar Pradesh. As of 2011, it has a population of 255, in 46 households.

== Demographics ==
As of 2011, Mahipura had a population of 255, in 46 households. This population was 56.1% male (143) and 43.9% female (112). The 0-6 age group numbered 45 (27 male and 18 female), making up 17.6% of the total population. No residents were members of Scheduled Castes.

The 1981 census recorded Mahipura as having a population of 220 people (123 male and 97 female), in 31 households and 31 physical houses.

The 1961 census recorded Mahipura as comprising 1 hamlet, with a total population of 119 people (72 male and 47 female), in 18 households and 10 physical houses. The area of the village was given as 200 acres.

== Infrastructure ==
As of 2011, Mahipura had 1 primary school; it did not have any healthcare facilities. Drinking water was provided by hand pump and tube well/borehole; there were no public toilets. The village did not have a post office or public library; there was at least some access to electricity for all purposes. Streets were made of both kachcha and pakka materials.
