= Garhi Janu =

Village in Uttar Pradesh, India

- Village
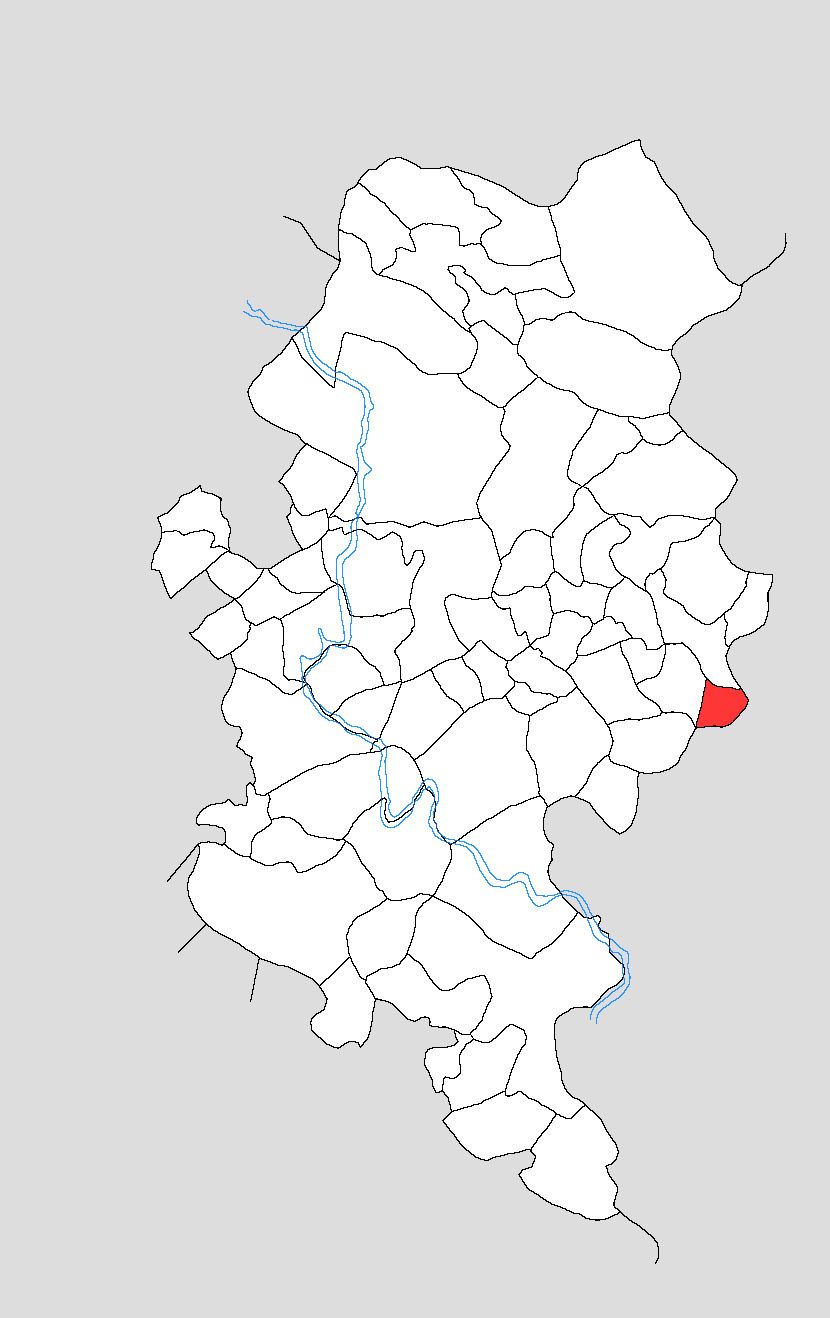
- Map showing Garhi Janu in Kotla block

- Location in Uttar Pradesh, India
- Coordinates: 27.25629°N 78.47488°E
- Country: India
- State: Uttar Pradesh
- District: Firozabad
- Tehsil: Firozabad

Area
  - Total: 0.78 km^{2} (0.30 sq mi)

Population (2011)
  - Total: 517
  - Density: 660/km^{2} (1,700/sq mi)
- Time zone: UTC+5:30 (IST)
- PIN: 283203

Garhi Janu (Gaṛhī Janū) is a village in Kotla block of Firozabad district, Uttar Pradesh. As of 2011, it has a population of 517, in 59 households.

== Demographics ==
As of 2011, Garhi Janu had a population of 517, in 59 households. This population was 51.5% male (266) and 48.5% female (251). The 0-6 age group numbered 68 (37 male and 31 female), making up 13.2% of the total population. No residents were members of Scheduled Castes.

The 1981 census recorded Garhi Janu (spelled as one word, "Garhijanu") as having a population of 226 people (120 male and 106 female), in 28 households and 28 physical houses.

The 1961 census recorded Garhi Janu as comprising 1 hamlet, with a total population of 127 people (52 male and 75 female), in 16 households and 15 physical houses. The area of the village was given as 221 acres.

== Infrastructure ==
As of 2011, Garhi Janu had 1 primary school; it did not have any healthcare facilities. Drinking water was provided by tap, hand pump, and tube well/borehole; there were no public toilets. The village did not have a post office or public library; there was at least some access to electricity for residential and agricultural (but not commercial) purposes. Streets were made of both kachcha and pakka materials.
