= Atipur =

Village in Uttar Pradesh, India

- Village
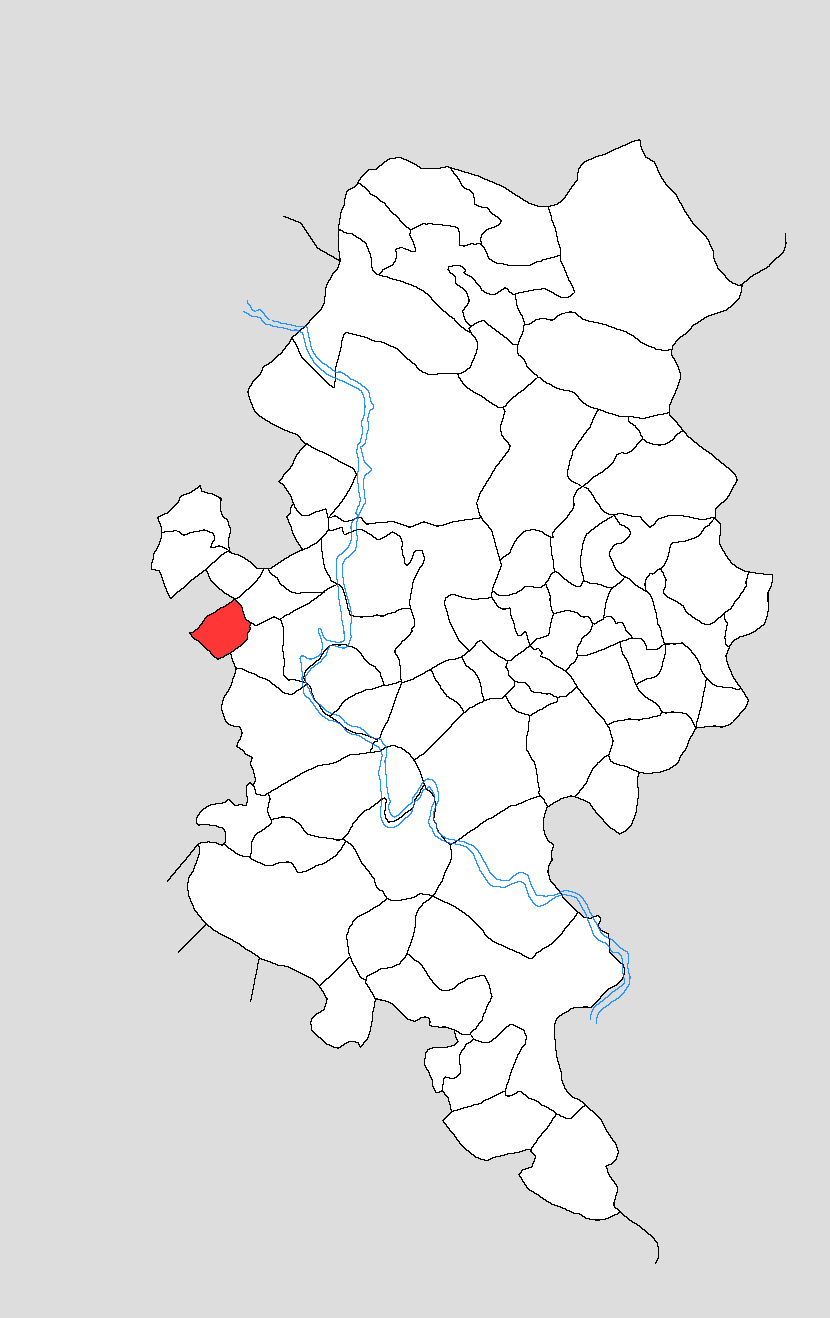
- Map showing Atipur in Kotla block

- Location in Uttar Pradesh, India
- Coordinates: 27.2735°N 78.36168°E
- Country: India
- State: Uttar Pradesh
- District: Firozabad
- Tehsil: Firozabad

Area
  - Total: 1.159 km^{2} (0.447 sq mi)

Population (2011)
  - Total: 1,339
  - Density: 1,155/km^{2} (2,992/sq mi)
- Time zone: UTC+5:30 (IST)

Atipur is a village in Kotla block of Firozabad district, Uttar Pradesh, India. As of 2011, it had a population of 1,339, in 247 households.

== Demographics ==
As of 2011, Atipur had a population of 1,339, in 247 households. This population was 54.3% male (727) and 45.7% female (612). The 0-6 age group numbered 211 (111 male and 100 female), making up 15.8% of the total population. 698 residents were members of Scheduled Castes, or 52.1% of the total.

The 1981 census recorded Atipur as having a population of 801 people (446 male and 355 female), in 128 households and 124 physical houses.

The 1961 census recorded Atipur as comprising 1 hamlet, with a total population of 577 people (312 male and 265 female), in 82 households and 69 physical houses. The area of the village was given as 287 acres.

== Infrastructure ==
As of 2011, Atipur had 1 primary school; it did not have any healthcare facilities. Drinking water was provided by hand pump; there were no public toilets. The village did not have a post office or public library; there was at least some access to electricity for all purposes. Streets were made of pakka materials.
