= Asalpur =

Village in Uttar Pradesh, India

- Village
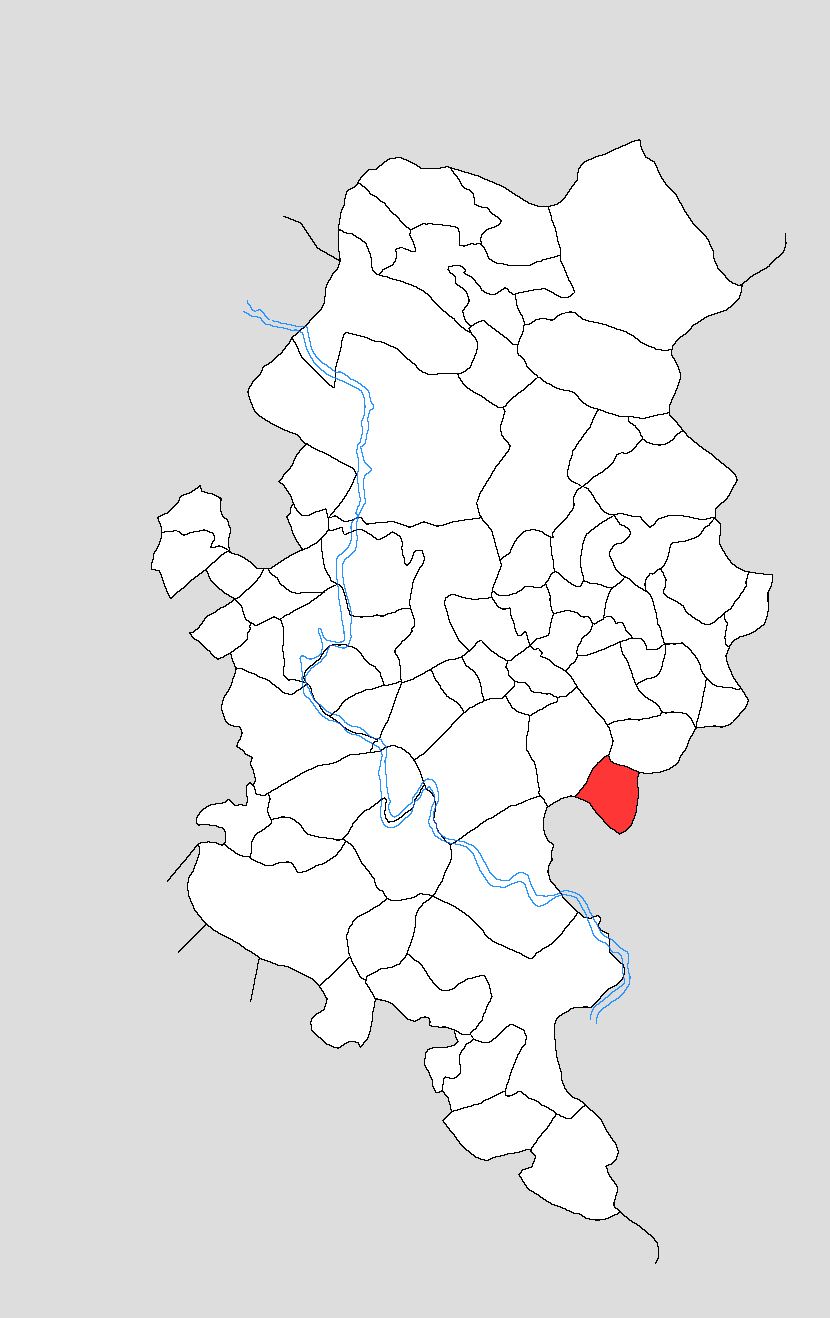
- Map showing Asalpur in Kotla block

- Location in Uttar Pradesh, India
- Coordinates: 27.24002°N 78.45179°E
- Country: India
- State: Uttar Pradesh
- District: Firozabad
- Tehsil: Firozabad

Area
  - Total: 1.324 km^{2} (0.511 sq mi)

Population (2011)
  - Total: 1,738
  - Density: 1,313/km^{2} (3,400/sq mi)
- Time zone: UTC+5:30 (IST)
- PIN: 283203

Asalpur (Āsalpur) is a village in Kotla block of Firozabad district, Uttar Pradesh. As of 2011, it has a population of 1,738, in 310 households.

== Demographics ==
As of 2011, Asalpur had a population of 1,738, in 310 households. This population was 52.7% male (916) and 47.3% female (822). The 0-6 age group numbered 298 (158 male and 140 female), making up 17.1% of the total population. 42 residents were members of Scheduled Castes, or 2.4% of the total.

The 1981 census recorded Lukharia as having a population of 333 people (177 male and 156 female), in 61 households and 61 physical houses.

The 1961 census recorded Asalpur as comprising 1 hamlet, with a total population of 445 people (243 male and 202 female), in 81 households and 64 physical houses. The area of the village was given as 394 acres and it had a medical practitioner at that point.

== Infrastructure ==
As of 2011, Asalpur had 1 primary school; it did not have any healthcare facilities. Drinking water was provided by tap, hand pump, and tube well/borehole; there were no public toilets. The village did not have a post office or public library; there was at least some access to electricity for residential and agricultural (but not commercial) purposes. Streets were made of both kachcha and pakka materials.
