= Rudau Mustaqil =

Village in Uttar Pradesh, India

- Village
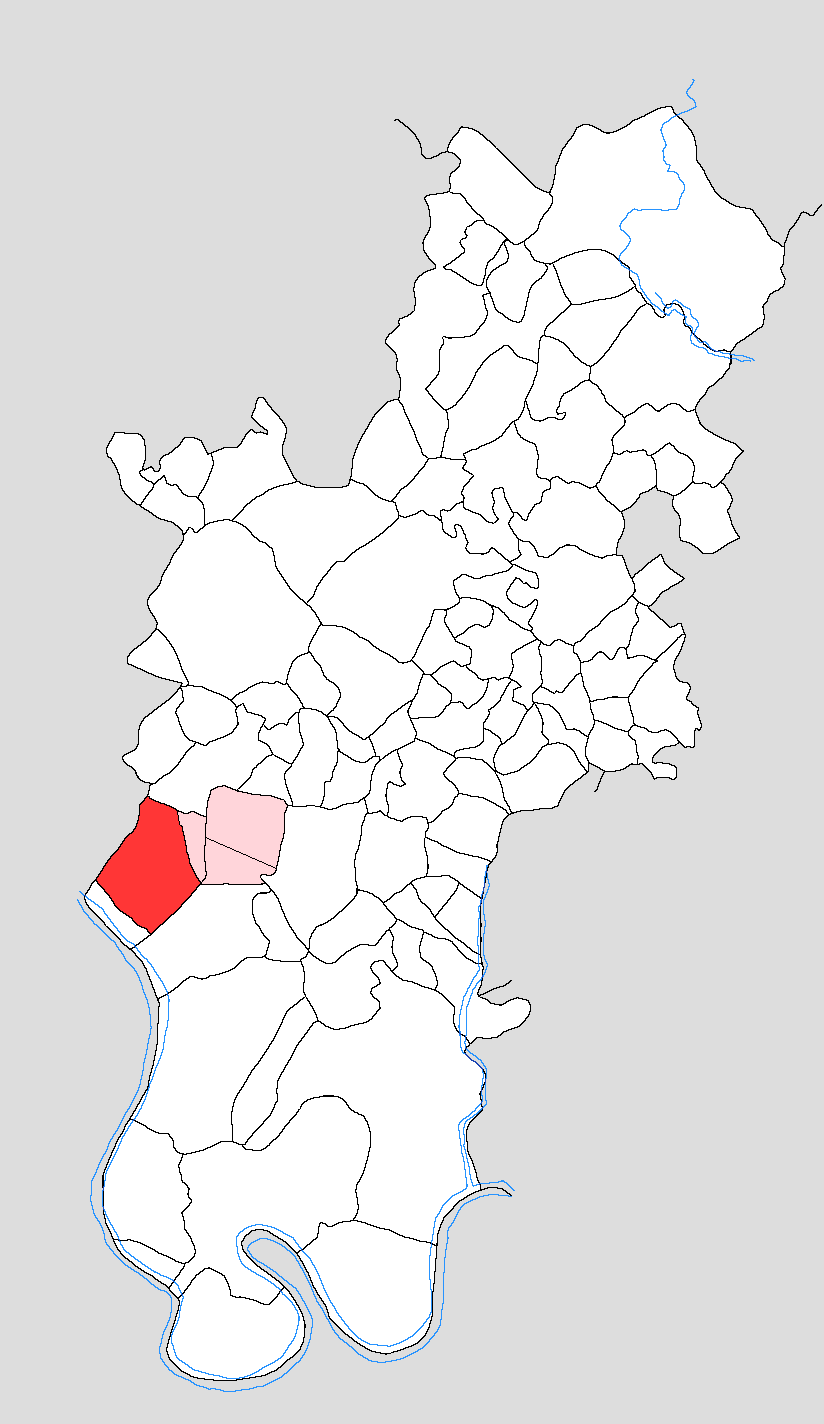
- Map showing Rudau Mustaqil in Tundla block

- Location in Uttar Pradesh, India
- Coordinates: 27.19286°N 78.20697°E
- Country: India
- State: Uttar Pradesh
- District: Firozabad
- Tehsil: Tundla

Area
  - Total: 8.203 km^{2} (3.167 sq mi)

Population (2011)
  - Total: 9,512
  - Density: 1,160/km^{2} (3,003/sq mi)
- Time zone: UTC+5:30 (IST)
- PIN: 283204

Rudau Mustaqil (Rudaū Mustaqil) is a village in Tundla block of Firozabad district, Uttar Pradesh. As of 2011, it has a population of 9,512, in 1,577 households.

== Demographics ==
As of 2011, Rudau Mustaqil had a population of 9,512, in 1,577 households. This population was 53.9% male (5,123) and 46.1% female (4,389). The 0-6 age group numbered 1,563 (842 male and 721 female), making up 16.4% of the total population. 999 residents were members of Scheduled Castes, or 10.5% of the total.

The 1981 census recorded Rudau Mustaqil (as "Rudhu Mustaquil") as having a population of 3,804 people (2,146 male and 1,658 female), in 691 households and 679 physical houses.

The 1961 census recorded Rudau Mustaqil (as simply "Rudau") as comprising 10 hamlets, with a total population of 2,096 people (1,119 male and 977 female), in 362 households and 270 physical houses. The area of the village was given as 2,350 acres.

== Infrastructure ==
As of 2011, Rudau Mustaqil had 6 primary schools; it did not have any healthcare facilities. Drinking water was provided by tap, hand pump, and tube well/borehole; there were no public toilets. The village had a public library but no post office; there was at least some access to electricity for all purposes. Streets were made of both kachcha and pakka materials.
