= Bhikanpur Meghpur =

Village in Uttar Pradesh, India

- Village
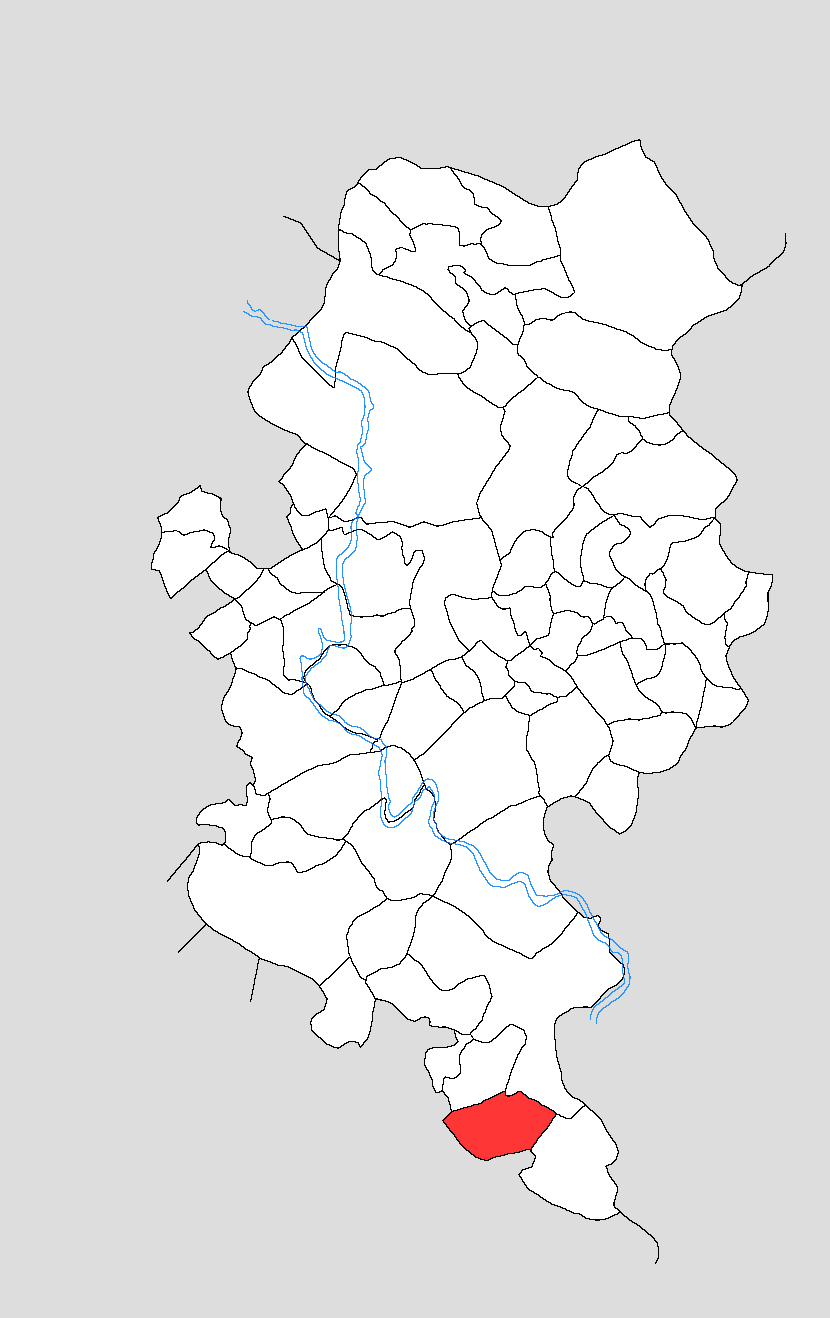
- Map showing Bhikanpur Meghpur in Kotla block

- Location in Uttar Pradesh, India
- Coordinates: 27.17158°N 78.4215°E
- Country: India
- State: Uttar Pradesh
- District: Firozabad
- Tehsil: Firozabad

Area
  - Total: 2.379 km^{2} (0.919 sq mi)

Population (2011)
  - Total: 3,722
  - Density: 1,565/km^{2} (4,052/sq mi)
- Time zone: UTC+5:30 (IST)

Bhikanpur Meghpur (Bhīkanpur Meghpur) is a village in Kotla block of Firozabad district, Uttar Pradesh. As of 2011, it has a population of 3,722, in 632 households.

== Demographics ==
As of 2011, Bhikanpur Meghpur had a population of 3,722, in 632 households. This population was 52.7% male (1,960) and 47.3% female (1,762). The 0-6 age group numbered 600 (310 male and 290 female), making up 16.1% of the total population. 916 residents were members of Scheduled Castes, or 24.6% of the total.

The 1981 census recorded Bhikanpur Meghpur as having a population of 1,546 people (822 male and 724 female), in 277 households and 273 physical houses.

The 1961 census recorded Bhikanpur Meghpur as comprising 3 hamlets, with a total population of 927 people (494 male and 433 female), in 144 households and 134 physical houses. The area of the village was given as 565 acres.

== Infrastructure ==
As of 2011, Bhikanpur Meghpur had 3 primary schools; it did not have any healthcare facilities. Drinking water was provided hand pump and tube well/borehole; there were no public toilets. The village did not have a post office or public library; there was at least some access to electricity for all purposes. Streets were made of both kachcha and pakka materials.
