= Gangni, Uttar Pradesh =

Village in Uttar Pradesh, India

Gangni
- Village
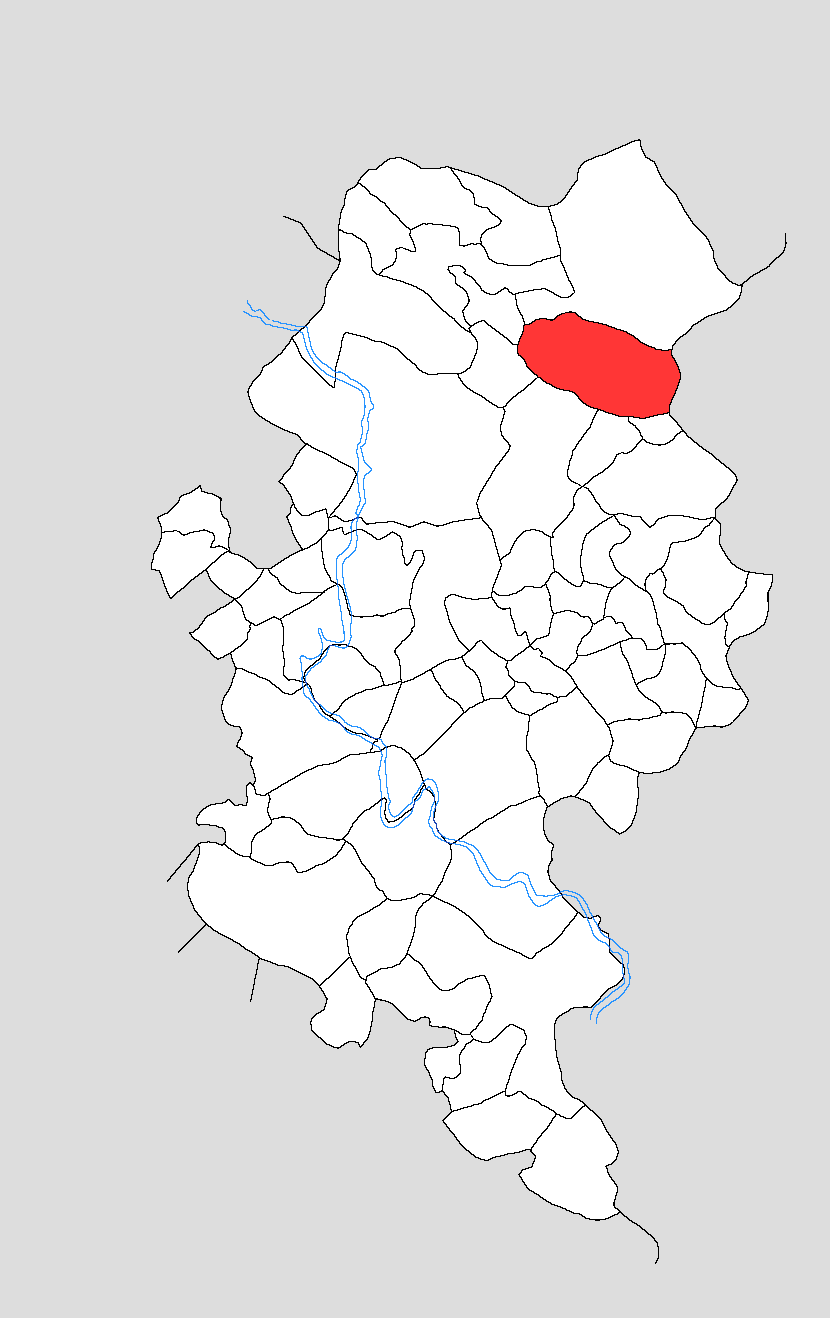
- Map showing Gangni in Kotla block

- Location in Uttar Pradesh, India
- Coordinates: 27.32716°N 78.44901°E
- Country: India
- State: Uttar Pradesh
- District: Firozabad
- Tehsil: Firozabad

Area
  - Total: 5.725 km^{2} (2.210 sq mi)

Population (2011)
  - Total: 4,154
  - Density: 725.6/km^{2} (1,879/sq mi)
- Time zone: UTC+5:30 (IST)
- PIN: 283203

Gangni is a village in Kotla block of Firozabad district, Uttar Pradesh, India. As of 2011, it had a population of 4,154, in 748 households.

== Demographics ==
As of 2011, Gangni had a population of 4,154, in 748 households. This population was 53.3% male (2,214) and 46.7% female (1,940). The 0-6 age group numbered 680 (386 male and 294 female), making up 16.4% of the total population. 1,861 residents were members of Scheduled Castes, or 44.8% of the total.

The 1981 census recorded Gangni (as "Gangini") as having a population of 2,734 people (1,504 male and 1,230 female), in 463 households and 463 physical houses.

The 1961 census recorded Gangni as comprising 4 hamlets, with a total population of 2,268 people (1,257 male and 1,011 female), in 434 households and 308 physical houses. The area of the village was given as 1,432 acres and it had a post office and medical practitioner at that point.

At the turn of the 20th century, Gangni was described as a scattered agricultural village with a population over 2,000.

== Infrastructure ==
As of 2011, Gangni had 1 primary school; it did not have any healthcare facilities. Drinking water was provided by hand pump and tube well/borehole; there were no public toilets. The village had a sub post office but no public library; there was at least some access to electricity for all purposes. Streets were made of both kachcha and pakka materials.
