= Garhi Harrai =

Village in Uttar Pradesh, India

- Village
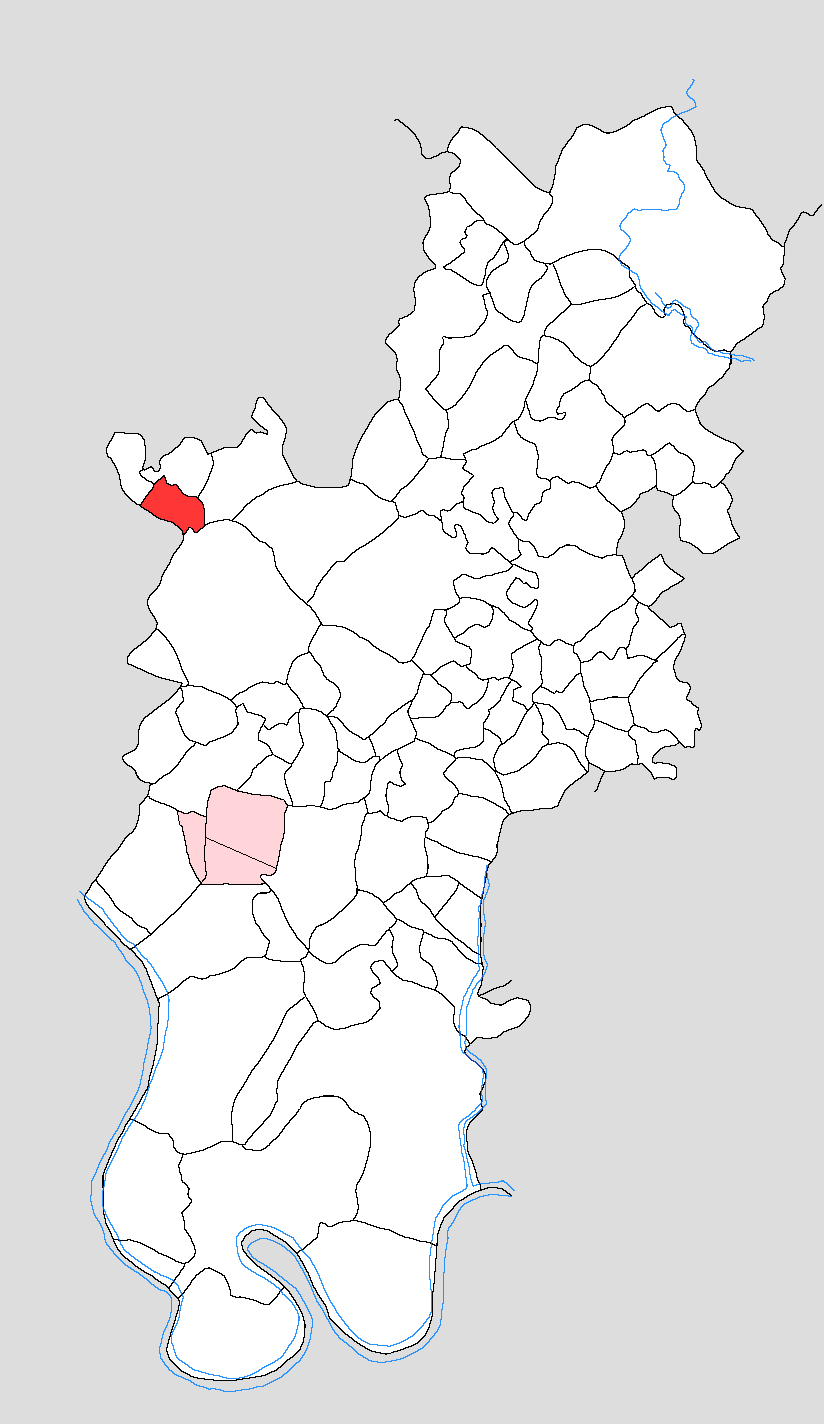
- Map showing Garhi Harrai in Tundla block

- Location in Uttar Pradesh, India
- Coordinates: 27.29394°N 78.21663°E
- Country: India
- State: Uttar Pradesh
- District: Firozabad
- Tehsil: Tundla

Area
  - Total: 1.63 km^{2} (0.63 sq mi)

Population (2011)
  - Total: 1,411
  - Density: 866/km^{2} (2,240/sq mi)
- Time zone: UTC+5:30 (IST)
- PIN: 283204

Garhi Harrai (Gaṛhī Harrāī) is a village in Tundla block of Firozabad district, Uttar Pradesh. As of 2011, it has a population of 1,411, in 252 households.

== Demographics ==
As of 2011, Garhi Harrai had a population of 1,411, in 252 households. This population was 54.7% male (772) and 45.3% female (639). The 0-6 age group numbered 232 (120 male and 112 female), making up 16.4% of the total population. 439 residents were members of Scheduled Castes, or 31.1% of the total.

The 1981 census recorded Garhi Harrai as having a population of 895 people (505 male and 390 female), in 165 households and 153 physical houses.

The 1961 census recorded Garhi Harrai as comprising 1 hamlet, with a total population of 709 people (378 male and 331 female), in 131 households and 111 physical houses. The area of the village was given as 405 acres.

== Infrastructure ==
As of 2011, Garhi Harrai had 1 primary school; it did not have any healthcare facilities. Drinking water was provided by hand pump; there were no public toilets. The village did not have a post office or public library; there was at least some access to electricity for all purposes. Streets were made of both kachcha and pakka materials.
