= Garhi Todia =

Village in Uttar Pradesh, India

- Village
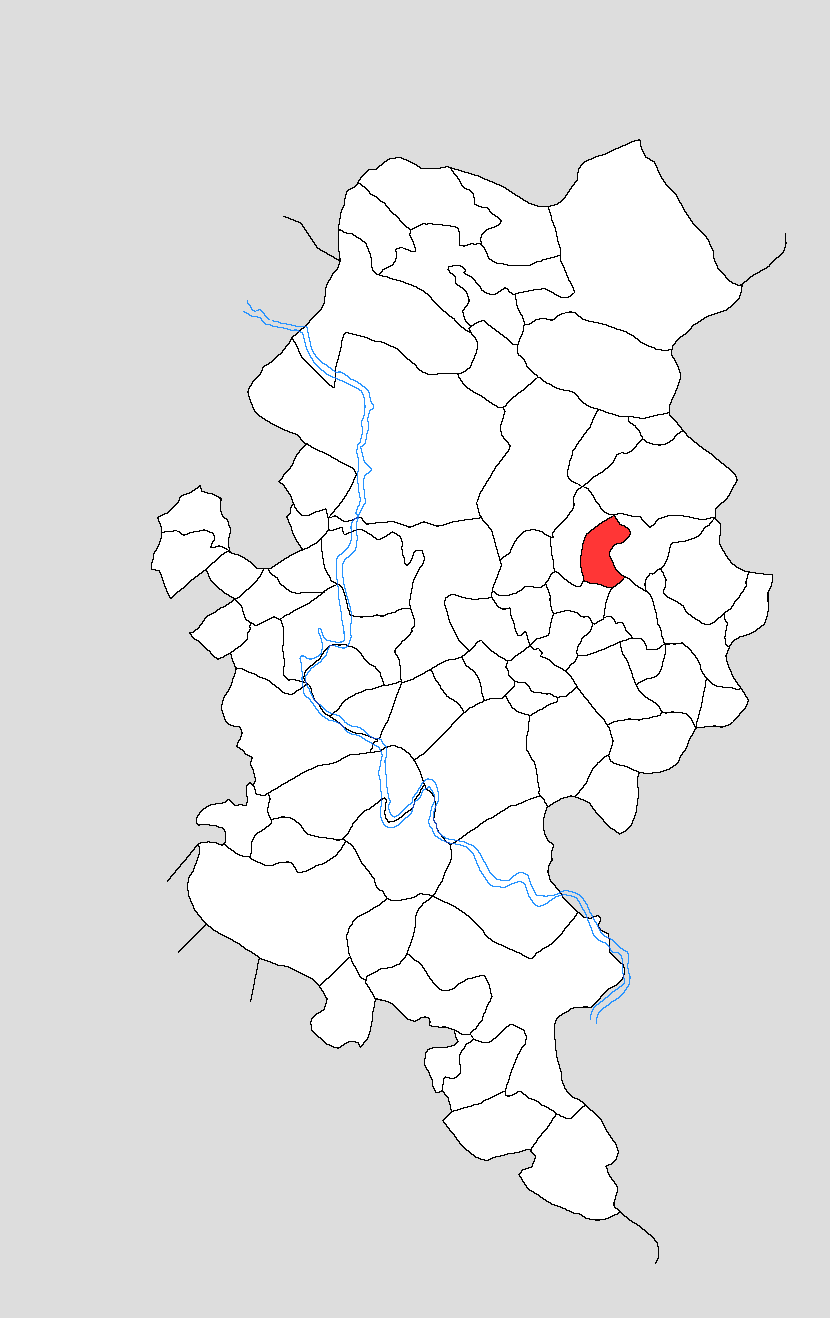
- Map showing Garhi Todia in Kotla block

- Location in Uttar Pradesh, India
- Coordinates: 27.2874°N 78.44739°E
- Country: India
- State: Uttar Pradesh
- District: Firozabad
- Tehsil: Firozabad

Area
  - Total: 1.14 km^{2} (0.44 sq mi)

Population (2011)
  - Total: 407
  - Density: 357/km^{2} (925/sq mi)
- Time zone: UTC+5:30 (IST)
- PIN: 283203

Garhi Todia (Gaṛhī Toḍiyā) is a village in Kotla block of Firozabad district, Uttar Pradesh. As of 2011, it has a population of 407, in 72 households.

== Demographics ==
As of 2011, Garhi Todia had a population of 407, in 72 households. This population was 55.8% male (227) and 44.2% female (180). The 0-6 age group numbered 62 (33 male and 29 female), making up 15.2% of the total population. 195 residents were members of Scheduled Castes, or 47.9% of the total.

The 1981 census recorded Garhi Todia as having a population of 205 people (110 male and 95 female), in 37 households and 37 physical houses.

The 1961 census recorded Garhi Todia (as "Garhi Toria") as comprising 1 hamlet, with a total population of 134 people (65 male and 69 female), in 24 households and 11 physical houses. The area of the village was given as 282 acres.

== Infrastructure ==
As of 2011, Garhi Todia had 1 primary school; it did not have any healthcare facilities. Drinking water was provided by hand pump and tube well/borehole; there were no public toilets. The village did not have a post office or public library; there was at least some access to electricity for all purposes. Streets were made of both kachcha and pakka materials.
