= Sikrari =

Village in Uttar Pradesh, India

- Village
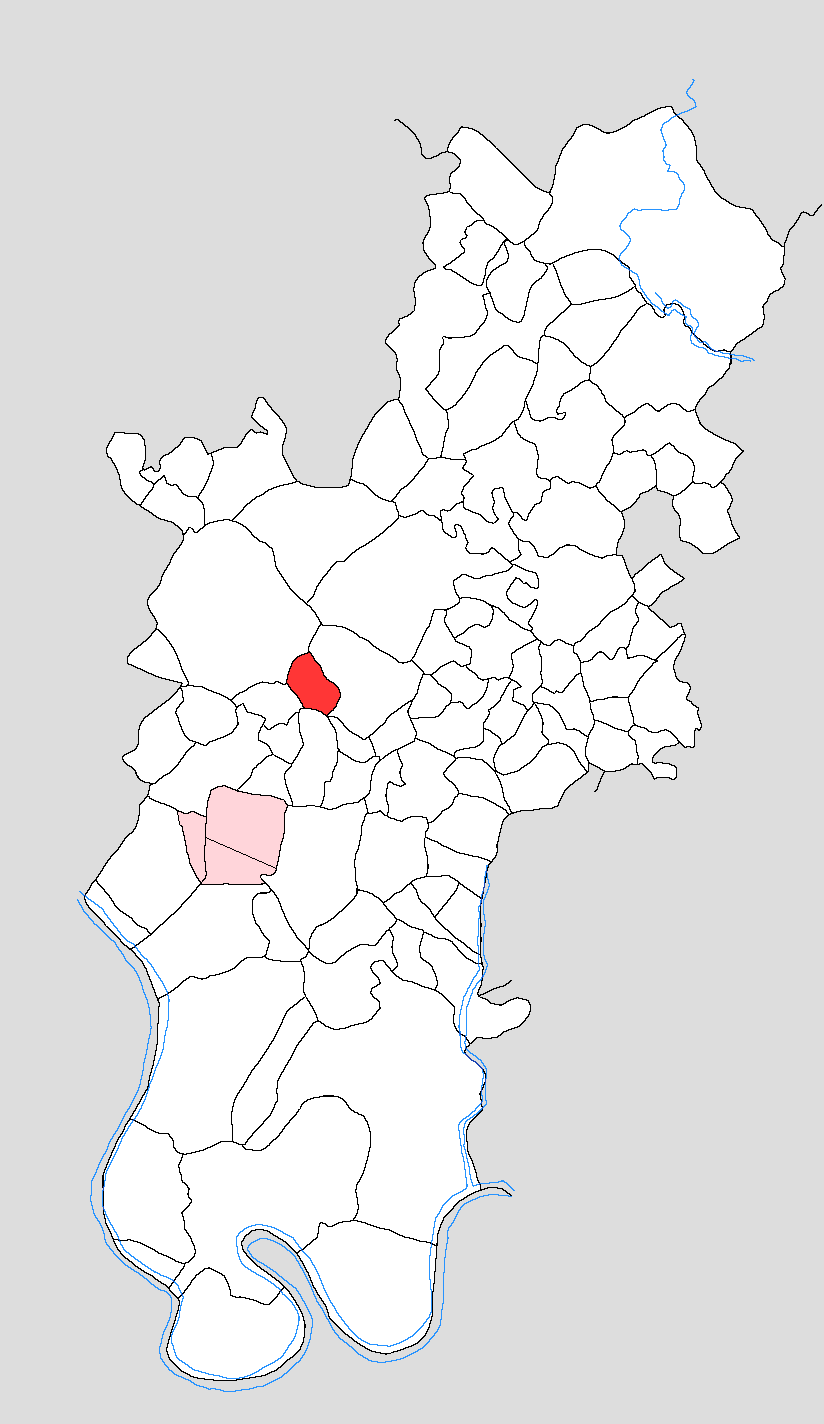
- Map showing Sikrari in Tundla block

- Location in Uttar Pradesh, India
- Coordinates: 27.25094°N 78.25717°E
- Country: India
- State: Uttar Pradesh
- District: Firozabad
- Tehsil: Tundla

Area
  - Total: 1.478 km^{2} (0.571 sq mi)

Population (2011)
  - Total: 2,636
  - Density: 1,783/km^{2} (4,619/sq mi)
- Time zone: UTC+5:30 (IST)

Sikrari (Sikrārī) is a village in Tundla block of Firozabad district, Uttar Pradesh. As of 2011, it has a population of 2,636, in 431 households.

== Demographics ==
As of 2011, Sikrari had a population of 2,636, in 431 households. This population was 53.5% male (1,410) and 46.5% female (1,226). The 0-6 age group numbered 372 (198 male and 174 female), making up 14.1% of the total population. 691 residents were members of Scheduled Castes, or 26.2% of the total.

The 1981 census recorded Sikrari as having a population of 1,389 people (781 male and 608 female), in 240 households and 234 physical houses.

The 1961 census recorded Sikrari as comprising 1 hamlet, with a total population of 799 people (417 male and 382 female), in 109 households and 93 physical houses. The area of the village was given as 379 acres and At that time he had a doctor whose name was Thakur Mahendra Singh..

== Infrastructure ==
As of 2011, Sikrari had 1 primary school; it did not have any healthcare facilities. Drinking water was provided by hand pump and tube well/borehole; there were no public toilets. The village did not have a post office or public library; there was at least some access to electricity for all purposes. Streets were made of pakka materials.
