= Garhi Bhopal =

Village in Uttar Pradesh, India

- Village
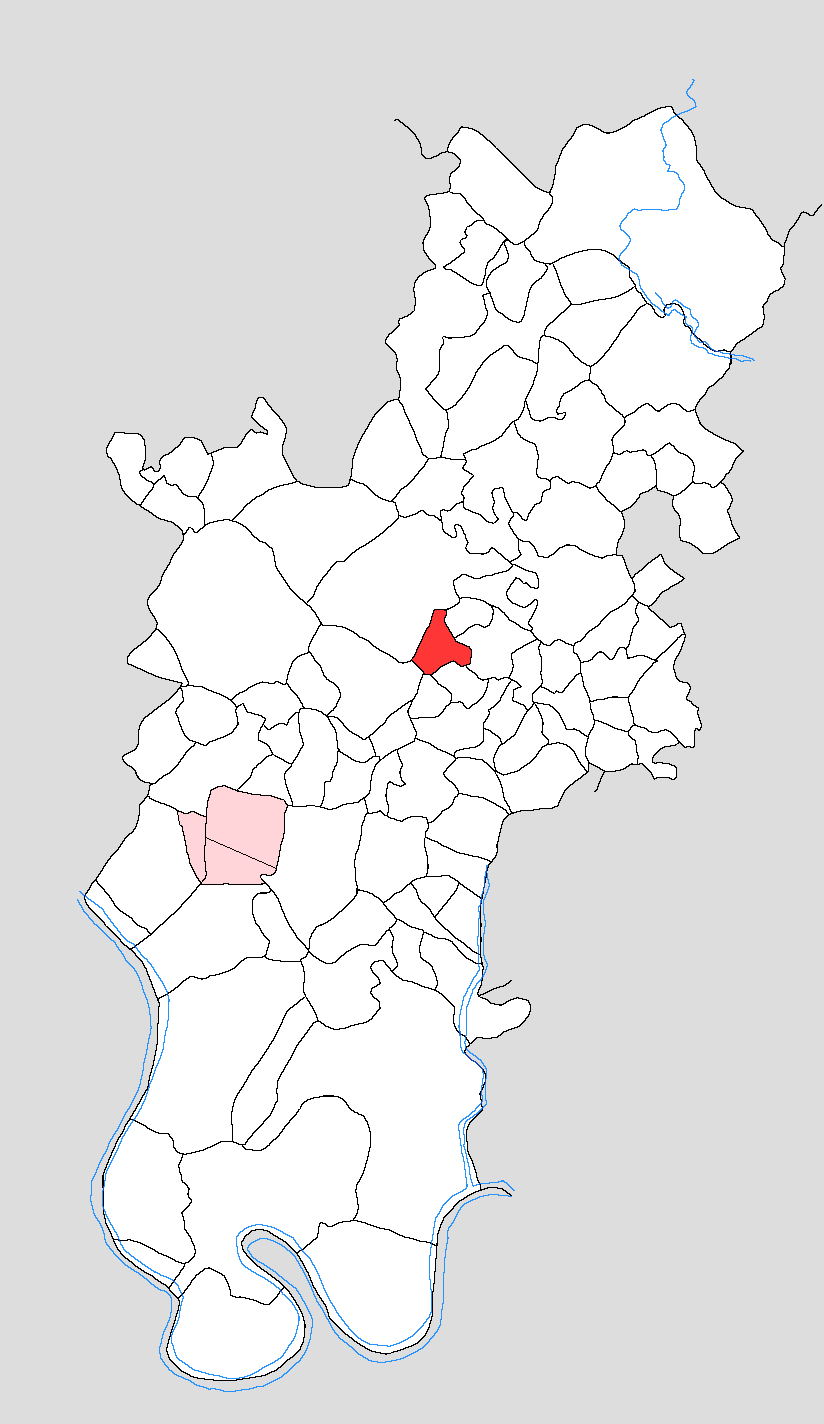
- Map showing Garhi Bhopal in Tundla block

- Location in Uttar Pradesh, India
- Coordinates: 27.2638793°N 78.29797°E
- Country: India
- State: Uttar Pradesh
- District: Firozabad
- Tehsil: Tundla

Area
  - Total: 1.336 km^{2} (0.516 sq mi)

Population (2011)
  - Total: 719
  - Density: 538/km^{2} (1,390/sq mi)
- Time zone: UTC+5:30 (IST)
- PIN: 283204

Garhi Bhopal (Gaṛhī Bhopāl) is a village in Tundla block of Firozabad district, Uttar Pradesh. As of 2011, it has a population of 719, in 152 households.

== Demographics ==
As of 2011, Garhi Bhopal had a population of 719, in 152 households. This population was 54.4% male (391) and 45.6% female (328). The 0-6 age group numbered 113 (58 male and 55 female), making up 15.7% of the total population. 325 residents were members of Scheduled Castes, or 45.2% of the total.

The 1981 census recorded Garhi Bhopal as having a population of 469 people (265 male and 204 female), in 83 households and 83 physical houses.

The 1961 census recorded Garhi Bhopal as comprising 1 hamlet, with a total population of 316 people (173 male and 143 female), in 48 households and 42 physical houses. The area of the village was given as 329 acres.

== Infrastructure ==
As of 2011, Garhi Bhopal had 1 primary school; it did not have any healthcare facilities. Drinking water was provided by hand pump; there were no public toilets. The village had a public library but no post office; there was at least some access to electricity for all purposes. Streets were made of both kachcha and pakka materials.
