= Alampur Kotla =

Village in Uttar Pradesh, India

- Village
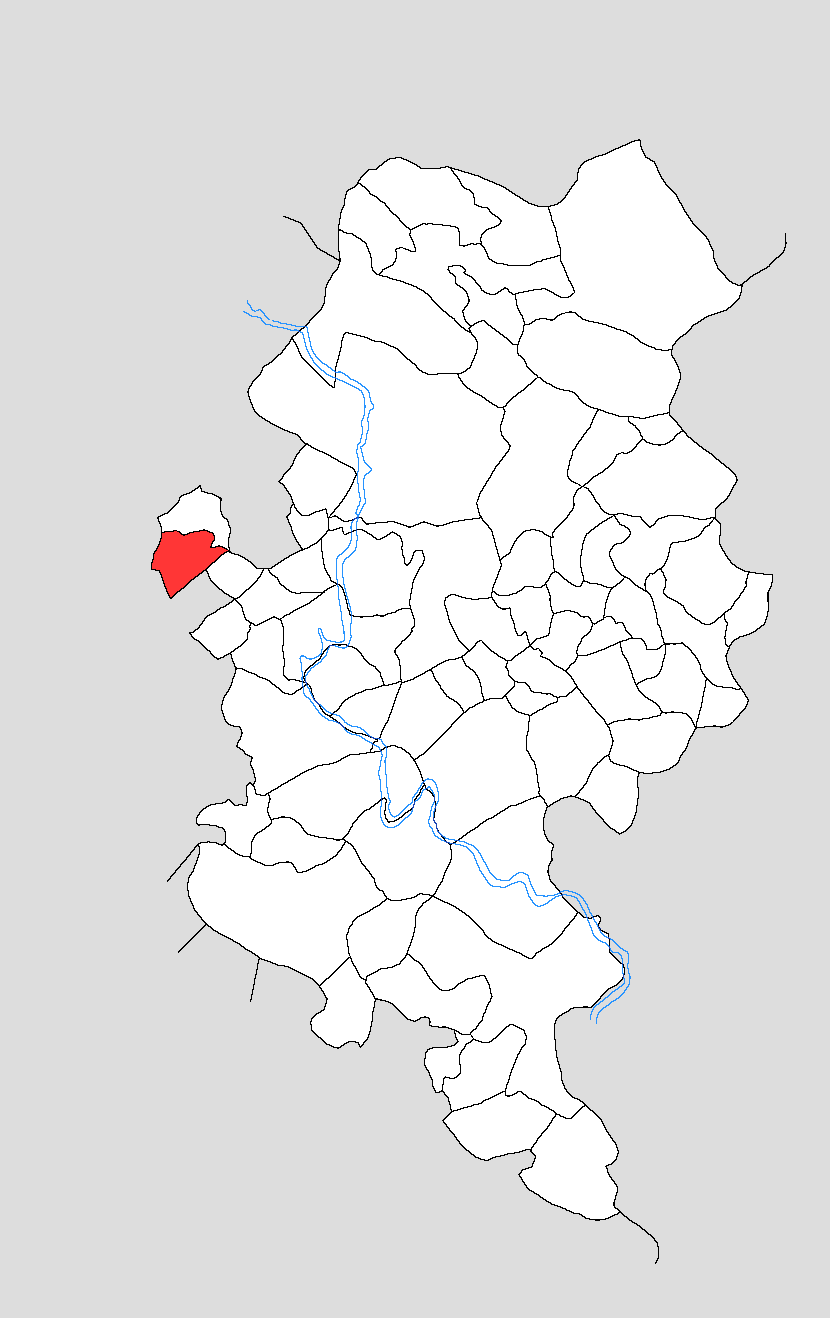
- Map showing Alampur Kotla in Kotla block

- Location in Uttar Pradesh, India
- Coordinates: 27.28911°N 78.35292°E
- Country: India
- State: Uttar Pradesh
- District: Firozabad
- Tehsil: Firozabad

Area
  - Total: 1.458 km^{2} (0.563 sq mi)

Population (2011)
  - Total: 979
  - Density: 671/km^{2} (1,740/sq mi)
- Time zone: UTC+5:30 (IST)

Alampur Kotla (Ālampur Koṭlā) is a village in Kotla block of Firozabad district, Uttar Pradesh, India. As of 2011, it had a population of 979, in 190 households.

== Demographics ==
As of 2011, Alampur Kotla had a population of 979, in 190 households. This population was 54.0% male (529) and 46.0% female (450). The 0-6 age group numbered 164 (90 male and 74 female), making up 16.75% of the total population. 446 residents were members of Scheduled Castes, or 45.6% of the total.

The 1981 census recorded Alampur Kotla as having a population of 547 people (301 male and 246 female), in 100 households and 100 physical houses.

The 1961 census recorded Alampur Kotla as comprising 1 hamlet, with a total population of 390 people (202 male and 188 female), in 70 households and 52 physical houses. The area of the village was given as 375 acres.

== Infrastructure ==
As of 2011, Alampur Kotla had 1 primary school; it did not have any healthcare facilities. Drinking water was provided by hand pump and tube well/borehole; there were no public toilets. The village did not have a post office or public library; there was at least some access to electricity for residential and agricultural (but not commercial) purposes. Streets were made of both kachcha and pakka materials.
