= Nagla Buddh Singh, Shikohabad =

Coordinates: 27.069°N 78.586°E

Nagla Buddh Singh is a small village in Shikohabad tehsil, Firozabad district, Uttar Pradesh.

== Location ==
The village is located 1km south of Nizampur Garhuma. The nearest major city is Agra which is about 60 km from the village. The nearest railway station is Shikohabad Jn. which is about 2 km from the village. The nearest bus stop is Shikohabad bus stop which is 5 km from the city.

Yamuna is the nearest major river, 12km to the south.

The PIN Code for the village is 283141.

== Climate ==
The weather is typically like that of Agra. Days and nights both are almost same in terms of temperature. May–June are the peak months, temperature in these months is about 36-46'C. During rainy season the temperature typically fluctuates between 24-36'C. In Dec-Jan the temperature is 12-24'C in day time.

== Population ==
Population of the village is about 200-220.

== History ==
The village was founded by Thakur Buddh Singh Ji and because of that it is named on his name.

== Transport ==
Shikohabad is the city which connects the village with other major cities.

== Literacy & Employment ==
There is one primary school. Some villagers are educated to postgraduate level. The major source of earning is farming (Kheti). Potato farm is the key source of earning and there are other crops too like Corn, Millet (Bajara), Wheat, Watermelon, Muskmelon, Pulse( Urad), Kidney bean (moong), Mustard, Rice.

== Fairs and festivals ==
Villagers celebrate all major Hindu festivals. Diwali, Holi, Raksha-Bandhan are the major festivals. There is a fair on Mahaveer (Hanumaan) Jayanti.
