= Tundla Kham =

- Census town
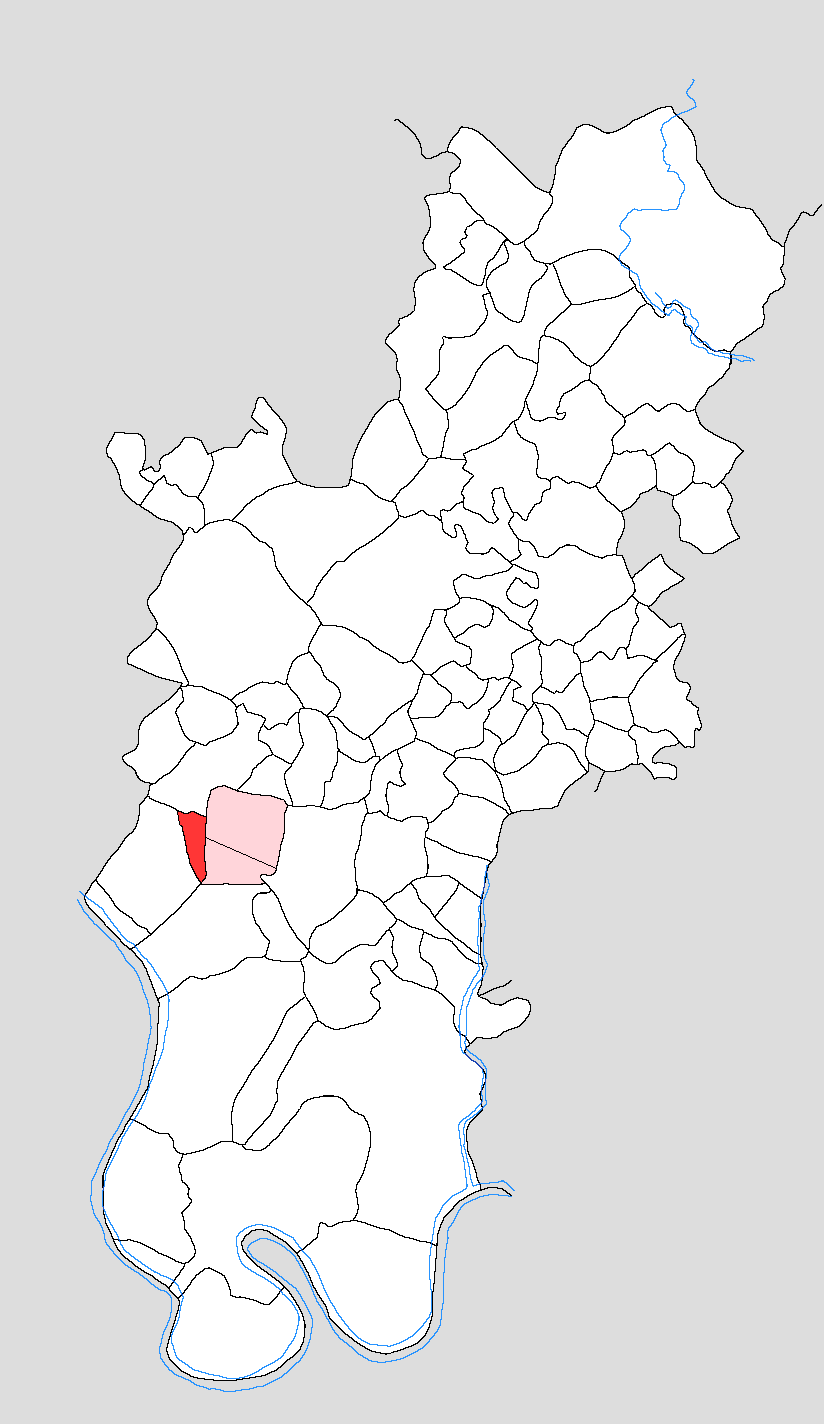
- Map showing Tundla Kham in Tundla block

- Location in Uttar Pradesh, India
- Coordinates: 27.206396°N 78.259563°E
- Country: India
- State: Uttar Pradesh
- District: Firozabad

Population (2001)
  - Total: 5,156

Languages
  - Official: Hindi
- Time zone: UTC+5:30 (IST)

Tundla Kham is a census town in Firozabad district in the Indian state of Uttar Pradesh.

== Demographics ==
As of 2001 India census, Tundla Kham had a population of 5,156. Males constitute 53% of the population and females 47%. Tundla Kham has an average literacy rate of 74%, higher than the national average of 59.5%: male literacy is 82%, and female literacy is 65%. In Tundla Kham, 15% of the population is under 6 years of age.
