= J.S. University =

Private university in Uttar Pradesh

J.S. University, Shikohabad, Firozabad
- Type: Private University
- Established: 2015
- Affiliations: University Grants Commission
- Chancellor: Dr. SukeSh Yadav
- Vice-Chancellor: Prof. Hari Mohan
- Location: Shikohabad, Firozabad district, Uttar Pradesh, India; 27.1241725°N 78.6351961°E
- Website: https://jsu.ac.in/

J.S. University is a private university established in 2015 by Sri Jagdish Jan Kalyan Educational Trust at Shikohabad of Firozabad district, Uttar Pradesh, India. It was established by Uttar Pradesh act no.7 of 2015 and recognised by University Grants Commission (India) under section 12(f) of its act.

== Location ==
The University campus is located at Mainpuri Road, Shikohabad.
