= Tundla Railway Colony =

- city
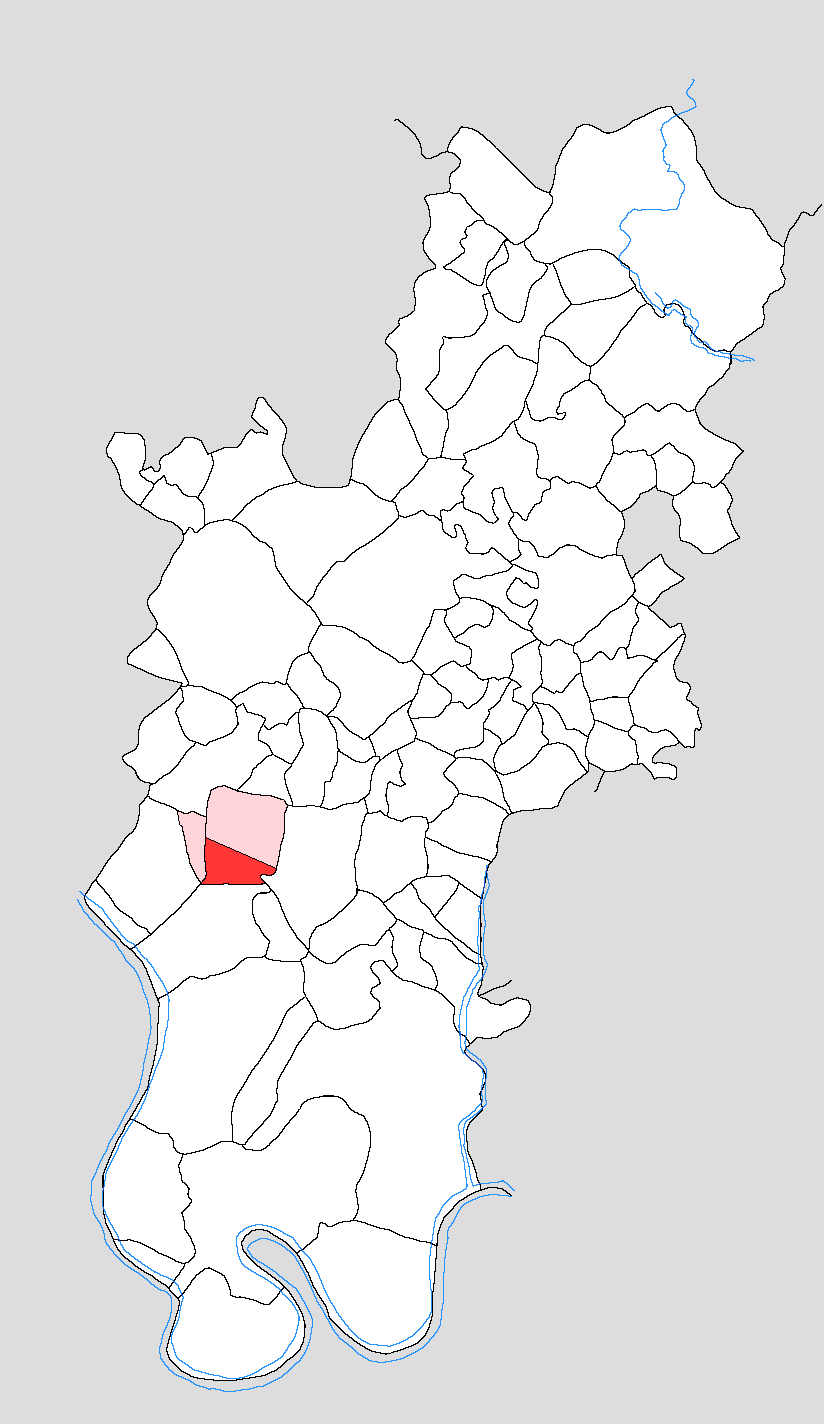
- Map showing Tundla Railway Colony in Tundla block

- Location in Uttar Pradesh, India
- Coordinates: 27.200442°N 78.283253°E
- Country: India
- State: Uttar Pradesh
- District: Firozabad

Population (2001)
  - Total: 11,983

Languages
  - Official: Hindi
- Time zone: UTC+5:30 (IST)

Tundla Railway Colony is a census town in Firozabad district, in the Indian state of Uttar Pradesh.

== Demographics ==
As of 2001 India census, Tundla Railway Colony had a population of 11,983. Males constitute 54% of the population, and females 46%. Tundla Railway Colony has an average literacy rate of 78%, which is higher than the national average of 59.5% (male literacy is 86%, and female literacy is 69%). In Tundla Railway Colony, 10% of the population is under 6 years of age.

== Overview ==
Tundla Railway Colony has three big play grounds: Company Bagh Ground, Manoranjan Kendra Ground, and R.P.F. Barrack Ground. The main play ground is Company Bagh Ground.
