= Firozabad district =

Chandr Nagar district
- District of Uttar Pradesh
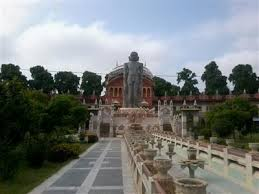
- Jain temple in Firozabad

- Location of Firozabad district in Uttar Pradesh
- Coordinates (Chandr Nagar): 27.1518°N 78.4016°E
- Country: India
- State: Uttar Pradesh
- Division: Agra
- Headquarters: Firozabad

Government
  - District Magistrate: Shri Santosh Kumar Sharma(IAS)
  - Lok Sabha constituencies: Firozabad

Area
  - Total: 2,407 km^{2} (929 sq mi)

Population (2023)
  - Total: 3,472,437
  - Density: 1,443/km^{2} (3,736/sq mi)

Demographics
  - Literacy: 74.6%.
- Time zone: UTC+05:30 (IST)
- Major highways: NH 19
- Website: http://firozabad.nic.in/

Firozabad district (Hindustani pronunciation: [fɪɾoːzaːbaːd̪]) is one of the western districts of the Indian state of Uttar Pradesh, which has Firozabad city as its district headquarters. Administratively, the district is a part of the Agra division.

== History ==
The city lies in the cultural region of Braj and was a part of the Surasena Mahajanapada of Aheers during the Vedic Age. It was subsequently ruled by larger kingdoms like the Mauryas, Guptas, Scythians, Kushans, and Indo-Greeks before falling into the hands of local Rajput, Ahir and Jat rulers. The Bhadoria Rajputs from Agra, Jats of Bharatpur and Aheers of Gundhau and Dheerpura have ruled the city for some time. It was named after Firoz Shah Mansab Dar in 1566 during the reign of Mughal Emperor Akbar. The 1596 gazetteer of Agra and Mathura records that Firozabad was upgraded to a Pargana then given to Nabab Sadulla as a jagir during the reign of Shah jahan (r. 1627–1658). Mr. Peter, a businessman connected with the East India Company, visited the town on 9 August 1632 and found it in good condition. Etawah, Budaun, Mainpuri and Firozabad were all first class mansabdars of the emperor Farrukhsiyar (r. 1713–1719). The estate of Rajput clans the Labhowa Jhala Hindu Rajas were subdued during the Mughal sultanate which captured many regions in the United Provinces, and by 1680 the Rajas of Labhowa lost control of Firozabad district. As written by British historian Matthew Atmore in his book Hindu Tribes and Castes, Jadaun Rajputs are here in huge numbers and other cities of Firozabad.

Bajirao Peshwa captured Firozabad and Etmadpur in 1737 in the regime of Mohammad Shah. Jat Rulers from Mahawan attacked Faujdar Hakim Kajim at Firozabad where they killed him on 9 May 1739, then went on to rule Firozabad for 30 years. Firozabad was also part of Bharatpur Kingdom. Gajuddin, Hidayat Vaksh (son of Alamgir II), his nephew, and Mirza Baba, his son in law, looted Firozabad. Mirza Nabab Khan stayed here until 1782. At the end of 18th century Firozabad was ruled by Himmat Bahadur Gusain with the cooperation of the Raja of Labhowa.

The French Army Chief Marathas D. Wayan established an ordnance factory in Firozabad in November 1794, an event that Thomas Traving mentions in his book Travels in India. Marathas appointed his subadar Lakwadads here who built a fort near the old tehsil. General Lek and General Vellajally attacked Firozabad in 1802. At the beginning of the British regime Firozabad was in the Etawah district and later attached to the Aligarh district. When Sadabad district was created in 1832, Firozabad was made a part of it then later in 1833 the town came under the aegis of Agra district. In 1847 the lakh business flourished in Firozabad.

In 1857, the freedom-fighting Chauhans and Aheers of Mainpuri, the Aheers Jamidar, Zamindaar of Chandwar and the local Malahs all took active parts in the Indian Rebellion. Noted Urdu poet Munir Shikohabadi was sentenced to Kala pani by the ruling East India Company. People from this city took part in the Khilafat Movement, the Quit India Movement and the Dandi March with some participants jailed. Mahatma Gandhi visited Firozabad 1929 followed by Semant Gandhi in 1935, Pandit Jawaharlal Nehru in 1937 and Netaji Subhas Chandra Bose in 1940.

Firozabad district was established on February 4, 1989 by an executive order passed by the Government of Uttar Pradesh. Previously, the areas had been part of Agra district and Mainpuri district.

== Demographics ==
Historical population
Year	Pop.	±% p.a.
1901	520,466	—
1911	501,357	−0.37%
1921	464,114	−0.77%
1931	487,700	+0.50%
1941	580,115	+1.75%
1951	666,941	+1.40%
1961	821,189	+2.10%
1971	1,034,964	+2.34%
1981	1,279,726	+2.15%
1991	1,555,685	+1.97%
2001	2,081,752	+2.96%
2011	2,498,156	+1.84%
2021	2,959,000	+1.71%

Religions in Firozabad district (2011)
Religion	Percent
Hinduism	85.69%
Islam	12.60%
Jainism	0.76%
Other or not stated	0.95%
Distribution of religions

According to the 2011 census Firozabad district has a population of 2,498,156, roughly equal to the nation of Kuwait or the US state of Nevada. This gives it a ranking of 173rd in India (out of a total of 640). The district has a population density of 1,044 inhabitants per square kilometre (2,700/sq mi) . Its population growth rate over the decade 2001-2011 was 21.62%. Firozabad has a sex ratio of 867 females for every 1000 males, and a literacy rate of 74.6%. 33.35% of the population lives in urban areas. Scheduled Castes make up 18.97% of the population.

Languages of Firozabad district (2011)
1. Hindi (97.0%)
2. Urdu (2.60%)
3. Others (0.37%)

At the time of the 2011 Census of India, 97% spoke Hindi as their first language and 2.6% Urdu as their first language. The local language of the district is Brajbhasha.

Firozabad is a primarily rural district, with 66.6% of the population living in rural areas and 33.4% living in urban areas as of 2011. At the sub-district level, this is reversed in the case of Firozabad tehsil, where 63.2% of the population lives in urban areas.

== Culture ==
The city is home to popular Hindu temples, mainly Vaishno Devi Dham, Kela Devi Temple, and Gopal Ashram (Hanuman Temple). There are many Jain temples in Firozabad including the well-known Chadamilal Jain temple, Shri Shuparshnath Jain Mandir in Gher Khokal (Mahaveer Chowk) and Chandprabhu Jain Mandir in Khidki. The two temples of Gherkhokal and Khidki are approximately 250–300 years old. The old name of Chandwar was taken from the idol of Chandprabhu made at the time of Jayachandra. Muhammad of Ghor attacked a holy Jain location situated 6 kilometres (3.7 mi) from Firozabad 19 times. An annual fair was held in Chandwar on October 2. The Jama Masjid, founded by the 16th century Mughal Emperor Akbar is the oldest mosque.

== Notable people ==
- Banarsidas Chaturvedi
- Totaram Sanadhya
- Anurag Verma
- Rajeshwar Prasad
- Raj Babbar
- Chandrasen Jadon

== Education ==
=== University ===
- J.S. University
- F.S. University
- C.L. Jain College

== Geography ==
- The District is connected by rail and bus to major cities. The nearest airport is in Agra.
- Longitude is 78 degree east and latitude 27 degrees north at a height of 164.467 metres (539.59 ft) above mean sea level.

The district borders Etah district to the North and Mainpuri and Etawah to the East with the Yamuna River forming the southern boundary. The area of the district accounts for about 0.8 percent of the total area of Uttar Pradesh and 1.1 percent of its population. Approximately 73.6 percent of people live in rural areas. Most of the district lies on a plain sloping from north west to south.

Firozabad has been ranked 1st best "National Clean Air City" under (Category 2 3-10L Population cities) in India according to 'Swachh Vayu Survekshan 2024 Results'.

== Transportation ==
Firozabad district has good transportation links due to National Highway 19 linking Delhi with Kolkata & Yammuna Express Way passing through it as does the busy railway route from Delhi to Kolkata. Agra is 44 km (27 mi) away, Kanpur is 250 km (160 mi) away, Delhi is 250 km (160 mi) away.

The nearest airport is in Agra which is a domestic airport.

The nearest railway stations are Firozabad railway station in the center of Firozabad and one in Tundla named Tundla Junction.

== Local industries ==
Firozabad has a major glass industry producing products that include glass bangles and glass hardware so it is also known as Suhag Nagari.. Various work is done on bangles in many places known locally as godam.

== Administration ==
Firozabad district is divided into 5 tehsils and more than 10 community development blocks, as follows:

- Tundla tehsil
  - Tundla block
  - Firozabad block (part)
- Firozabad tehsil
  - Kotla block
  - Firozabad block
- Jasrana tehsil
  - Eka block
  - Kheragarh block
  - Jasrana block
- Shikohabad tehsil
  - Shikohabad block
  - Araon block
  - Madanpur block
- Sirsaganj tehsil

== Municipalities ==
Firozabad district has 6 statutory towns, including 4 nagar palika parishads (municipal boards) and 2 nagar panchayats. There are also 3 non-statutory census towns in the district. The district's towns are as follows:

Town name	Classification	Tehsil	Population (in 2011)
Tundla	Nagar palika parishad	Tundla	50,423
Tundla Railway Colony	Census town	Tundla	7,404
Tundla Kham	Census town	Tundla	7,079
Firozabad	Nagar palika parishad	Firozabad	604,214
Fariha	Nagar panchayat	Jasrana	6,887
Jasrana	Nagar panchayat	Jasrana	10,648
Shikohabad	Nagar palika parishad	Shikohabad	107,404
Sirsaganj	Nagar palika parishad	Shikohabad	32,098
Makhanpur	Census town	Shikohabad	7,012

== Villages ==
- Nagla Beech
- Nagla Buddh Singh
- Parham
