= Jondhri =

Village in Uttar Pradesh, India

- Village
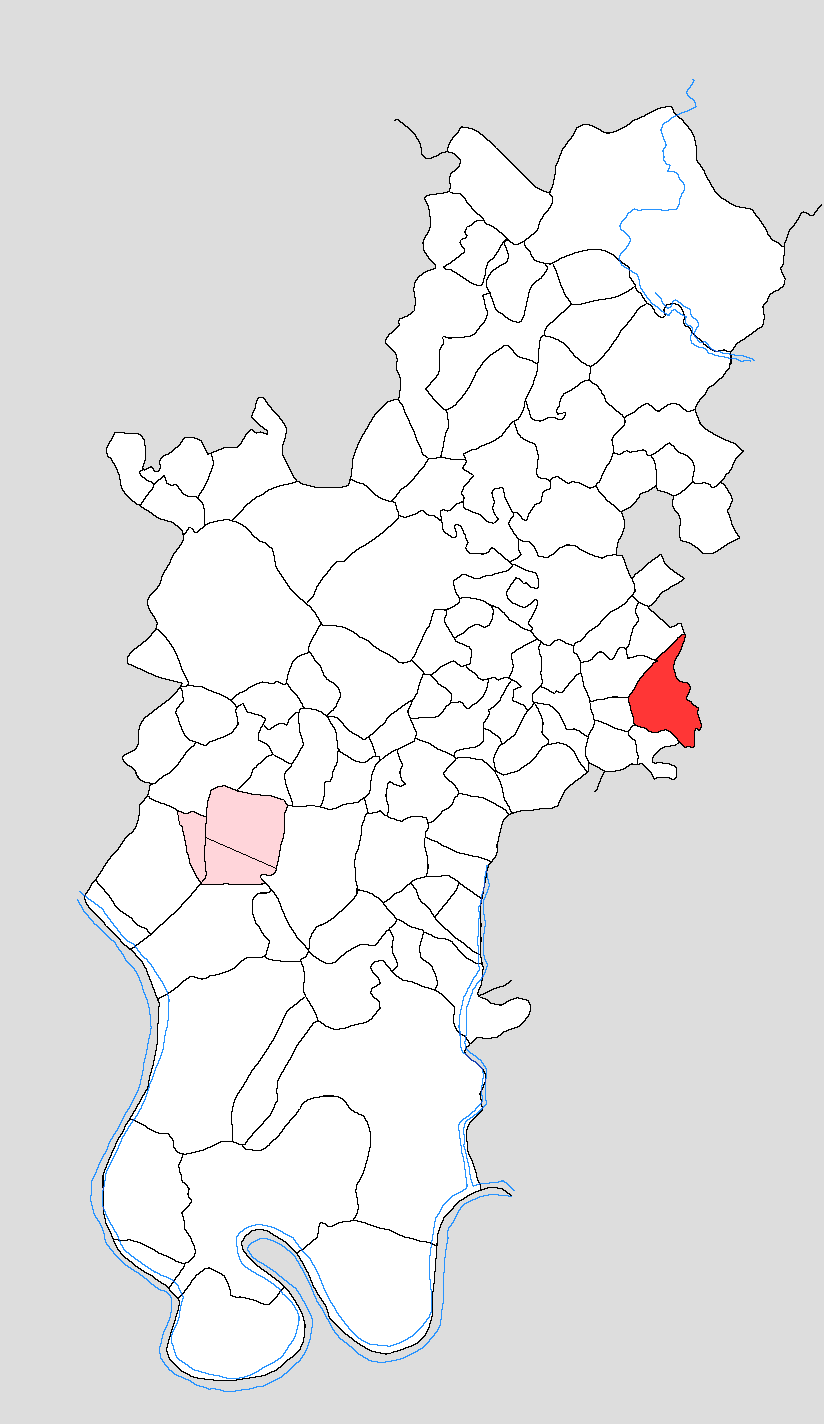
- Map showing Jondhri in Tundla block

- Location in Uttar Pradesh, India
- Coordinates: 27.25441°N 78.3517°E
- Country: India
- State: Uttar Pradesh
- District: Firozabad
- Tehsil: Tundla

Area
  - Total: 3.185 km^{2} (1.230 sq mi)

Population (2011)
  - Total: 2,406
  - Density: 755.4/km^{2} (1,957/sq mi)
- Time zone: UTC+5:30 (IST)

Jondhri (Jondhrī) is a village in Tundla block of Firozabad district, Uttar Pradesh. As of 2011, it has a population of 2,406, in 378 households.

== Demographics ==
As of 2011, Jondhri had a population of 2,406, in 378 households. This population was 53.3% male (1,283) and 46.7% female (1,123). The 0-6 age group numbered 366 (193 male and 173 female), making up 15.2% of the total population. 1,078 residents were members of Scheduled Castes, or 44.8% of the total.

The 1981 census recorded Jondhri (as "Jondhari") as having a population of 1,478 people (784 male and 694 female), in 235 households and 232 physical houses. It was then counted as part of Kotla block.

The 1961 census recorded Jondhri as comprising 1 hamlet, with a total population of 1,104 people (580 male and 524 female), in 191 households and 156 physical houses. The area of the village was given as 788 acres and it had a medical practitioner at that point. It was then counted as part of Kotla block.

== Infrastructure ==
As of 2011, Jondhri had 1 primary school and 1 primary health sub centre and veterinary hospital. Drinking water was provided by hand pump; there were no public toilets. The village did not have a post office or public library; there was at least some access to electricity for all purposes. Streets were made of both kachcha and pakka materials.
