= Garhi Ranchhor =

Village in Uttar Pradesh, India

- Village
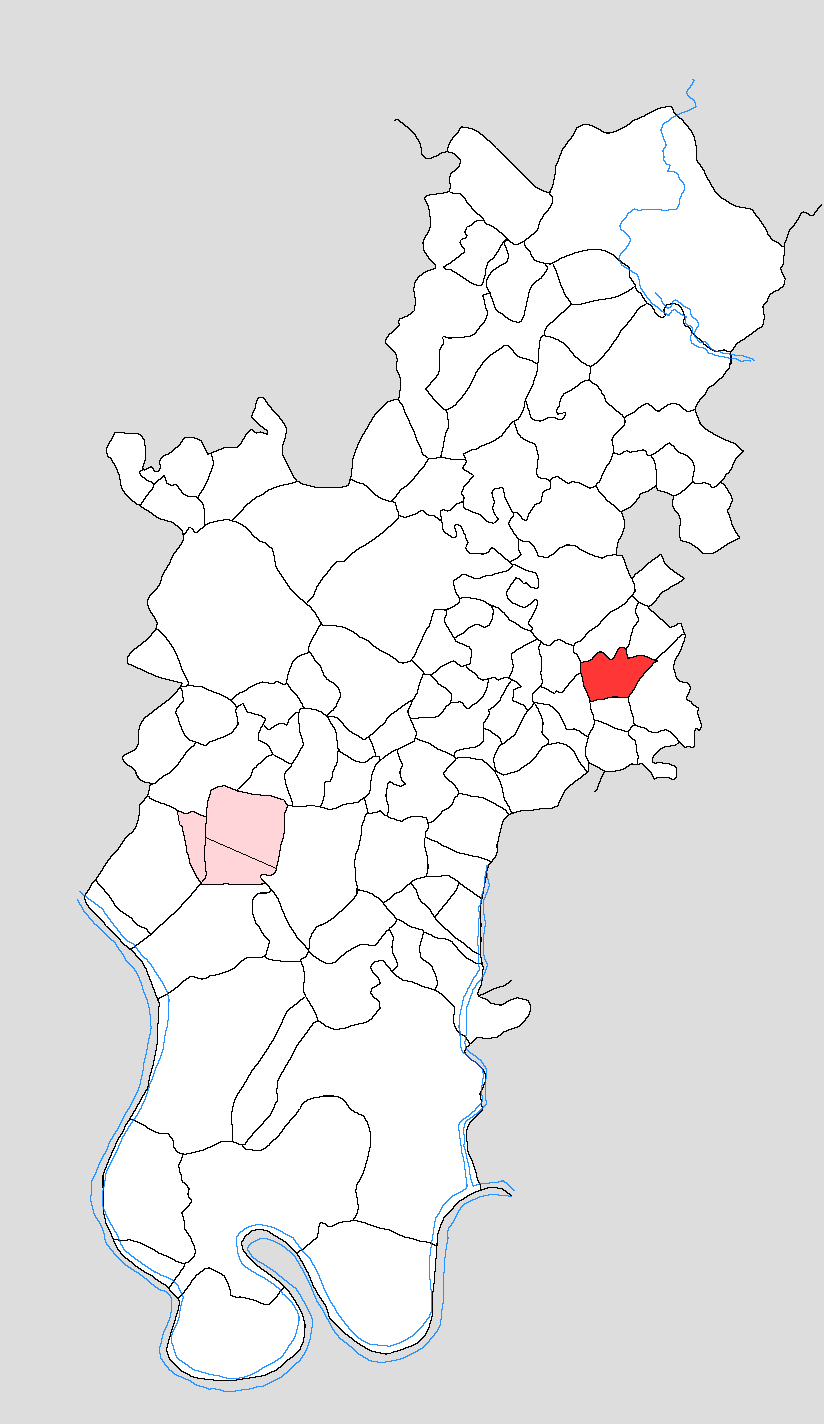
- Map showing Garhi Ranchhor in Tundla block

- Location in Uttar Pradesh, India
- Coordinates: 27.25511°N 78.34°E
- Country: India
- State: Uttar Pradesh
- District: Firozabad
- Tehsil: Tundla

Area
  - Total: 2.225 km^{2} (0.859 sq mi)

Population (2011)
  - Total: 1,545
  - Density: 694.4/km^{2} (1,798/sq mi)
- Time zone: UTC+5:30 (IST)

Garhi Ranchhor (Gaṛhī Rañchhor) is a village in Tundla block of Firozabad district, Uttar Pradesh. As of 2011, it has a population of 1,525, in 239 households.

== Demographics ==
As of 2011, Garhi Ranchhor had a population of 1,525, in 239 households. This population was 51.5% male (820) and 47.5% female (725). The 0-6 age group numbered 235 (133 male and 102 female), making up 15.4% of the total population. 97 residents were members of Scheduled Castes, or 6.4% of the total.

The 1981 census recorded Garhi Ranchhor (as "Garhi Rachhor") as having a population of 1,032 people (567 male and 465 female), in 181 households and 180 physical houses. It was then counted as part of Kotla block.

The 1961 census recorded Garhi Ranchhor as comprising 2 hamlets, with a total population of 728 people (408 male and 320 female), in 125 households and 91 physical houses. The area of the village was given as 548 acres and it had a medical practitioner at that point; it was then counted as part of Kotla block.

== Infrastructure ==
As of 2011, Garhi Ranchhor had 1 primary school; it did not have any healthcare facilities. Drinking water was provided by hand pump; there were no public toilets. The village did not have a post office or public library; there was at least some access to electricity for all purposes. Streets were made of both kachcha and pakka materials.
