= Rampur Katelia =

Village in Uttar Pradesh, India

Rampur Katelia Rampur Katailia
- Village
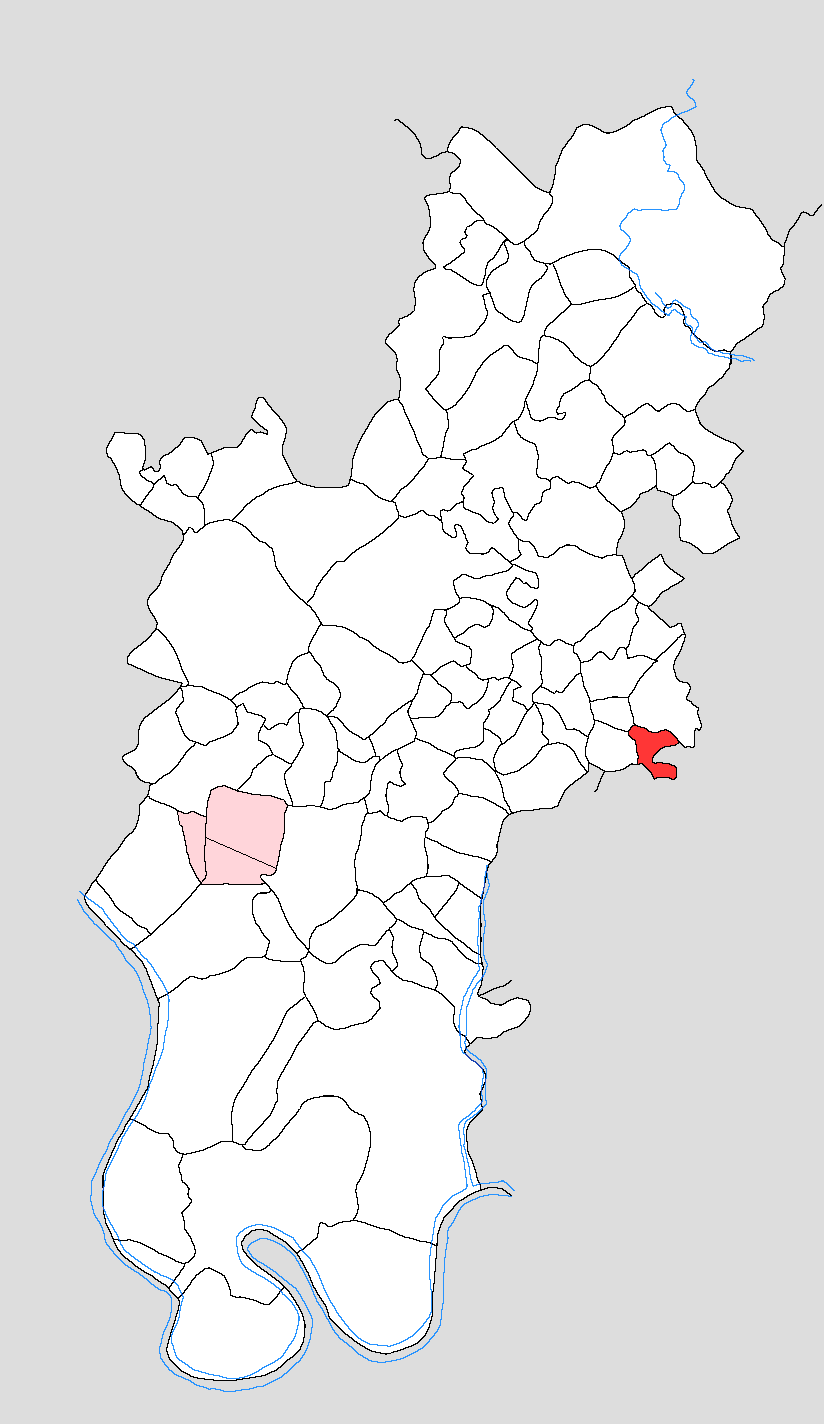
- Map showing Rampur Katailia in Tundla block

- Location in Uttar Pradesh, India
- Coordinates: 27.23689°N 78.3495°E
- Country: India
- State: Uttar Pradesh
- District: Firozabad
- Tehsil: Tundla

Area
  - Total: 1.158 km^{2} (0.447 sq mi)

Population (2011)
  - Total: 936
  - Density: 808/km^{2} (2,090/sq mi)
- Time zone: UTC+5:30 (IST)

Rampur Katelia (Rāmpur Kaṭeliyā), also spelled Rampur Katailia, is a village in Tundla block of Firozabad district, Uttar Pradesh. As of 2011, it has a population of 936, in 148 households.

== Demographics ==
As of 2011, Rampur Katelia had a population of 936, in 148 households. This population was 50.4% male (472) and 49.6% female (464). The 0-6 age group numbered 167 (87 male and 80 female), making up 17.8% of the total population. 152 residents were members of Scheduled Castes, or 16.2% of the total.

The 1981 census recorded Rampur Katelia as having a population of 579 people (323 male and 256 female), in 92 households and 92 physical houses. It was then counted as part of Kotla block.

The 1961 census recorded Rampur Katelia as comprising 1 hamlet, with a total population of 536 people (333 male and 203 female), in 73 households and 53 physical houses. The area of the village was given as 276 acres and it was then counted as part of Kotla block.

== Infrastructure ==
As of 2011, Rampur Katelia had 1 primary school; it did not have any healthcare facilities. Drinking water was provided by hand pump; there were no public toilets. The village did not have a post office or public library; there was at least some access to electricity for all purposes. Streets were made of both kachcha and pakka materials.
