= Nagla Sikandar =

Village in Uttar Pradesh, India

- Village
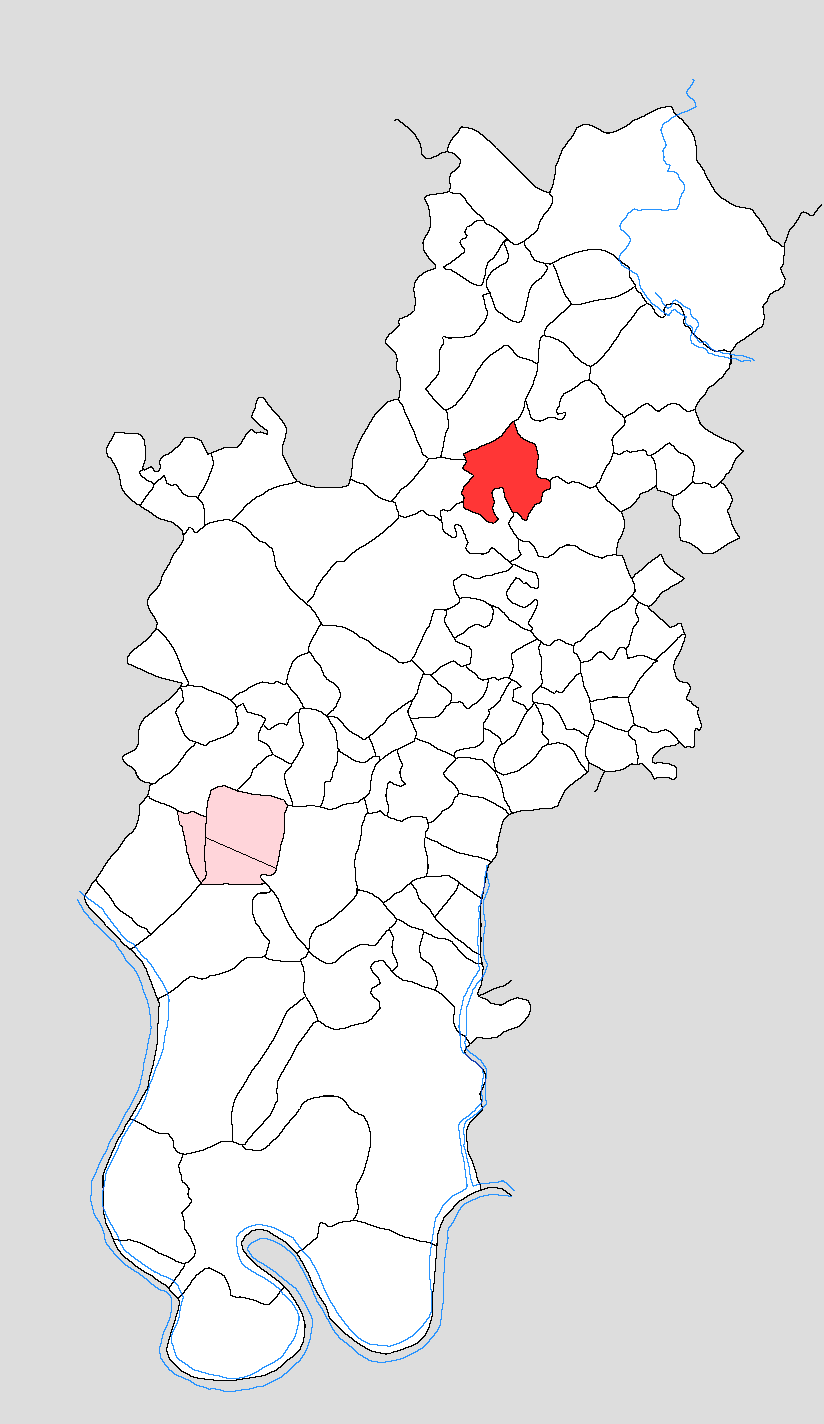
- Map showing Nagla Sikandar in Tundla block

- Location in Uttar Pradesh, India
- Coordinates: 27.30687°N 78.3118°E
- Country: India
- State: Uttar Pradesh
- District: Firozabad
- Tehsil: Tundla

Area
  - Total: 3.467 km^{2} (1.339 sq mi)

Population (2011)
  - Total: 3,083
  - Density: 889.2/km^{2} (2,303/sq mi)
- Time zone: UTC+5:30 (IST)
- PIN: 283204

Nagla Sikandar (Naglā Sikandar) is a village in Tundla block of Firozabad district, Uttar Pradesh. As of 2011, it has a population of 3,083, in 468 households.

== Demographics ==
As of 2011, Nagla Sikandar had a population of 3,083, in 468 households. This population was 53.6% male (1,651) and 46.4% female (1,432). The 0-6 age group numbered 439 (235 male and 204 female), making up 14.2% of the total population. 983 residents were members of Scheduled Castes, or 31.9% of the total.

The 1981 census recorded Nagla Sikandar as having a population of 1,788 people (997 male and 791 female), in 322 households and 305 physical houses. It was then counted as part of Kotla block.

The 1961 census recorded Nagla Sikandar as comprising 2 hamlets, with a total population of 1,249 people (673 male and 576 female), in 218 households and 154 physical houses. The area of the village was given as 862 acres and it was then counted as part of Kotla block.

== Infrastructure ==
As of 2011, Nagla Sikandar had 1 primary school; it did not have any healthcare facilities. Drinking water was provided by hand pump; there were no public toilets. The village had a sub post office but no public library; there was at least some access to electricity for all purposes. Streets were made of both kachcha and pakka materials.
