= Garhi Fateh =

Village in Uttar Pradesh, India

- Village
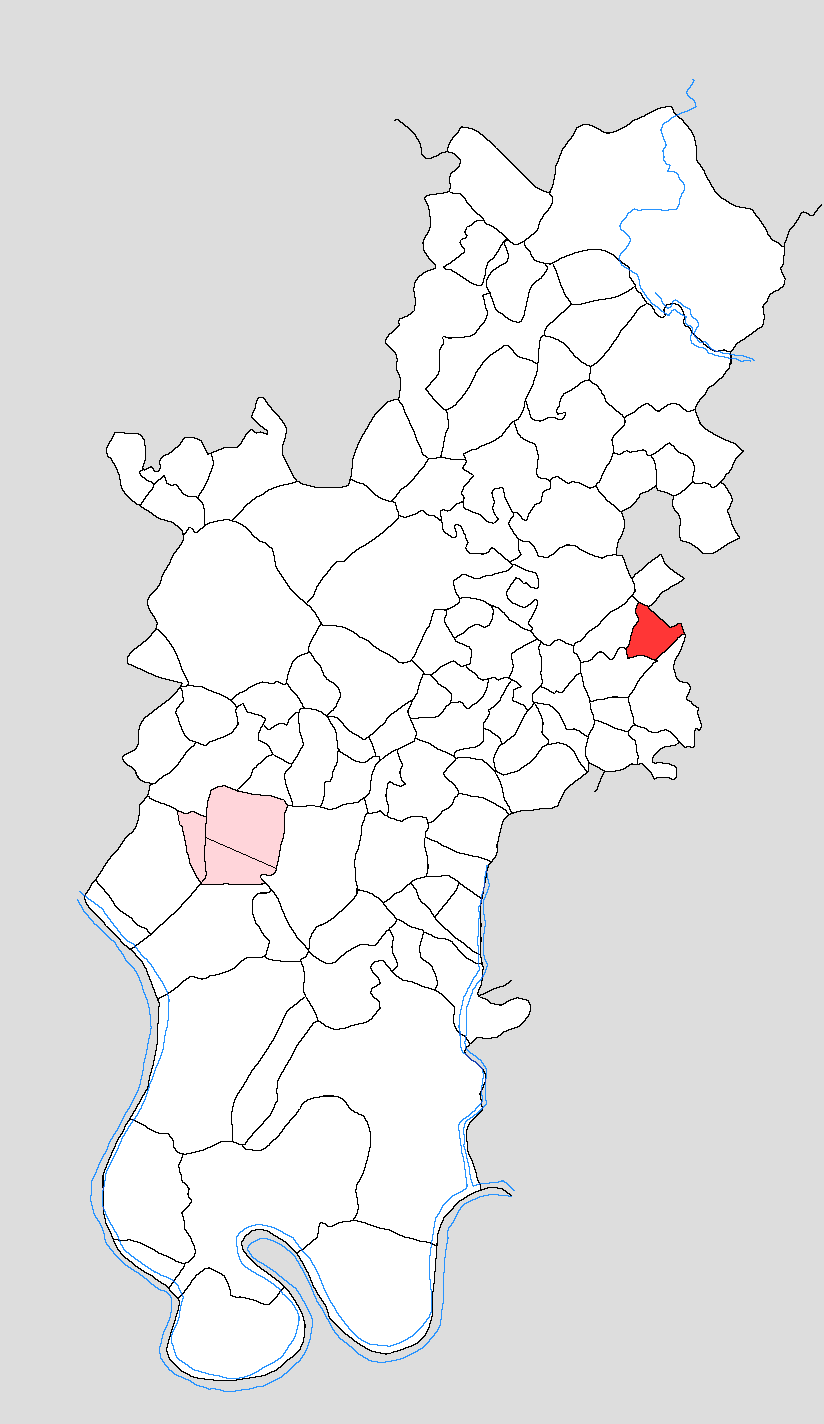
- Map showing Garhi Fateh in Tundla block

- Location in Uttar Pradesh, India
- Coordinates: 27.26459°N 78.3494°E
- Country: India
- State: Uttar Pradesh
- District: Firozabad
- Tehsil: Tundla

Area
  - Total: 1.125 km^{2} (0.434 sq mi)

Population (2011)
  - Total: 694
  - Density: 617/km^{2} (1,600/sq mi)
- Time zone: UTC+5:30 (IST)

Garhi Fateh (Gaṛhī Fateh) is a village in Tundla block of Firozabad district, Uttar Pradesh. As of 2011, it has a population of 694, in 128 households.

== Demographics ==
As of 2011, Garhi Fateh had a population of 694, in 128 households. This population was 53.9% male (374) and 46.1% female (320). The 0-6 age group numbered 102 (51 male and 51 female), making up 14.7% of the total population. 265 residents were members of Scheduled Castes, or 38.2% of the total.

The 1981 census recorded Garhi Fateh as having a population of 481 people (270 male and 211 female), in 82 households and 80 physical houses. It was then counted as part of Kotla block.

The 1961 census recorded Garhi Fateh as comprising 1 hamlet, with a total population of 382 people (204 male and 178 female), in 69 households and 50 physical houses. The area of the village was given as 289 acres and it was then counted as part of Kotla block.

== Infrastructure ==
As of 2011, Garhi Fateh had 1 primary school; it did not have any healthcare facilities. Drinking water was provided by hand pump; there were no public toilets. The village did not have a post office or public library; there was at least some access to electricity for all purposes. Streets were made of both kachcha and pakka materials.
