= Piprauli =

Village in Uttar Pradesh, India

- Village
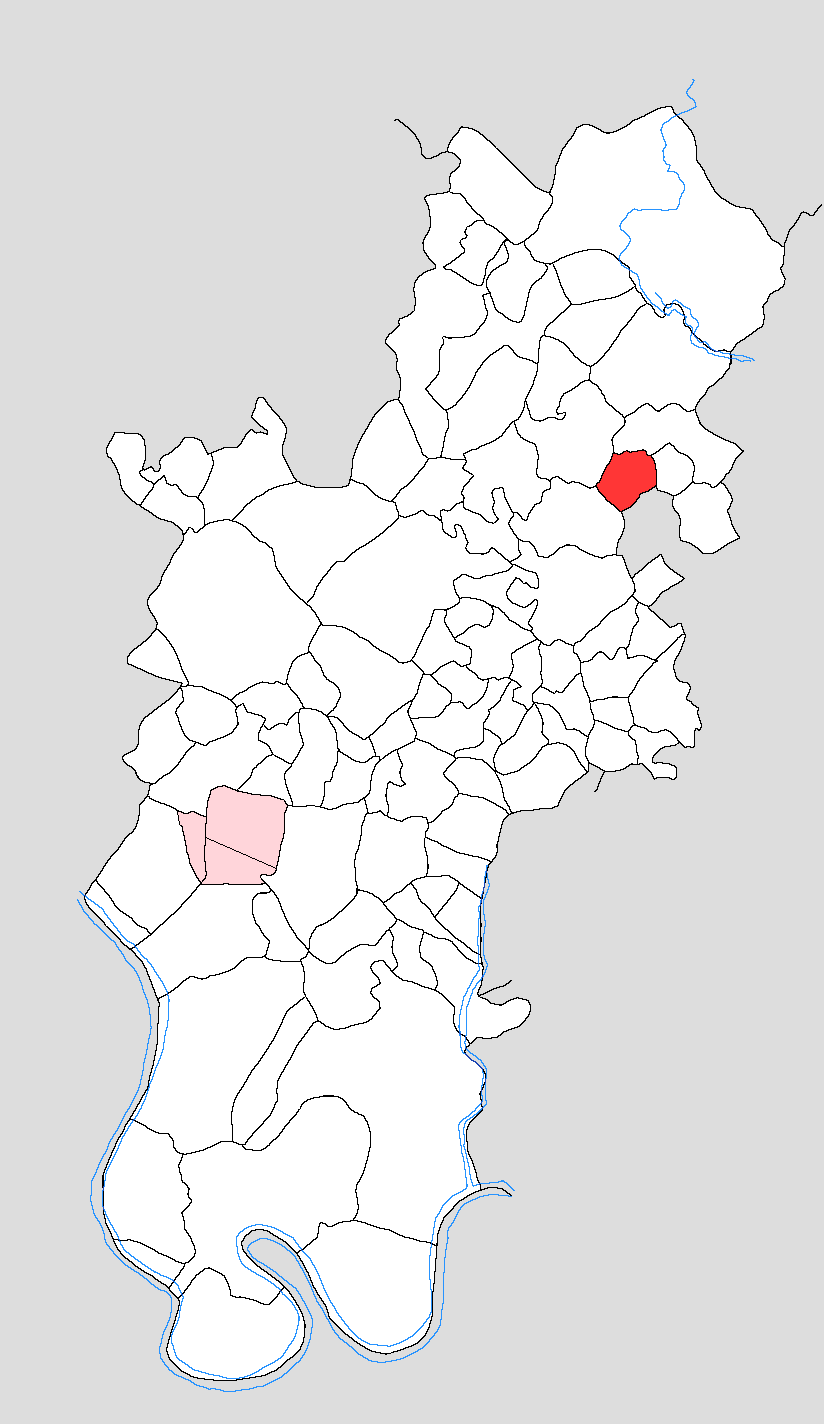
- Map showing Piprauli in Tundla block

- Location in Uttar Pradesh, India
- Coordinates: 27.30684°N 78.34564°E
- Country: India
- State: Uttar Pradesh
- District: Firozabad
- Tehsil: Tundla

Area
  - Total: 1.847 km^{2} (0.713 sq mi)

Population (2011)
  - Total: 1,865
  - Density: 1,010/km^{2} (2,615/sq mi)
- Time zone: UTC+5:30 (IST)
- PIN: 283204

Piprauli (Pipraulī) is a village in Tundla block of Firozabad district, Uttar Pradesh. As of 2011, it has a population of 1,865, in 297 households.

== Demographics ==
As of 2011, Piprauli had a population of 1,865, in 297 households. This population was 51.4% male (958) and 48.6% female (907). The 0-6 age group numbered 236 (127 male and 109 female), making up 12.7% of the total population. 441 residents were members of Scheduled Castes, or 23.6% of the total.

The 1981 census recorded Piprauli as having a population of 1,185 people (659 male and 526 female), in 178 households and 178 physical houses. It was then counted as part of Kotla block.

The 1961 census recorded Piprauli as comprising 1 hamlet, with a total population of 551 people (265 male and 286 female), in 115 households and 89 physical houses. The area of the village was given as 461 acres and it was then counted as part of Kotla block.

== Infrastructure ==
As of 2011, Piprauli had 1 primary school; it did not have any healthcare facilities. Drinking water was provided by hand pump; there were no public toilets. The village did not have a post office or public library; there was at least some access to electricity for all purposes. Streets were made of both kachcha and pakka materials.
