= Mohammadi, Firozabad =

Village in Uttar Pradesh, India

Mohammadi
- Village
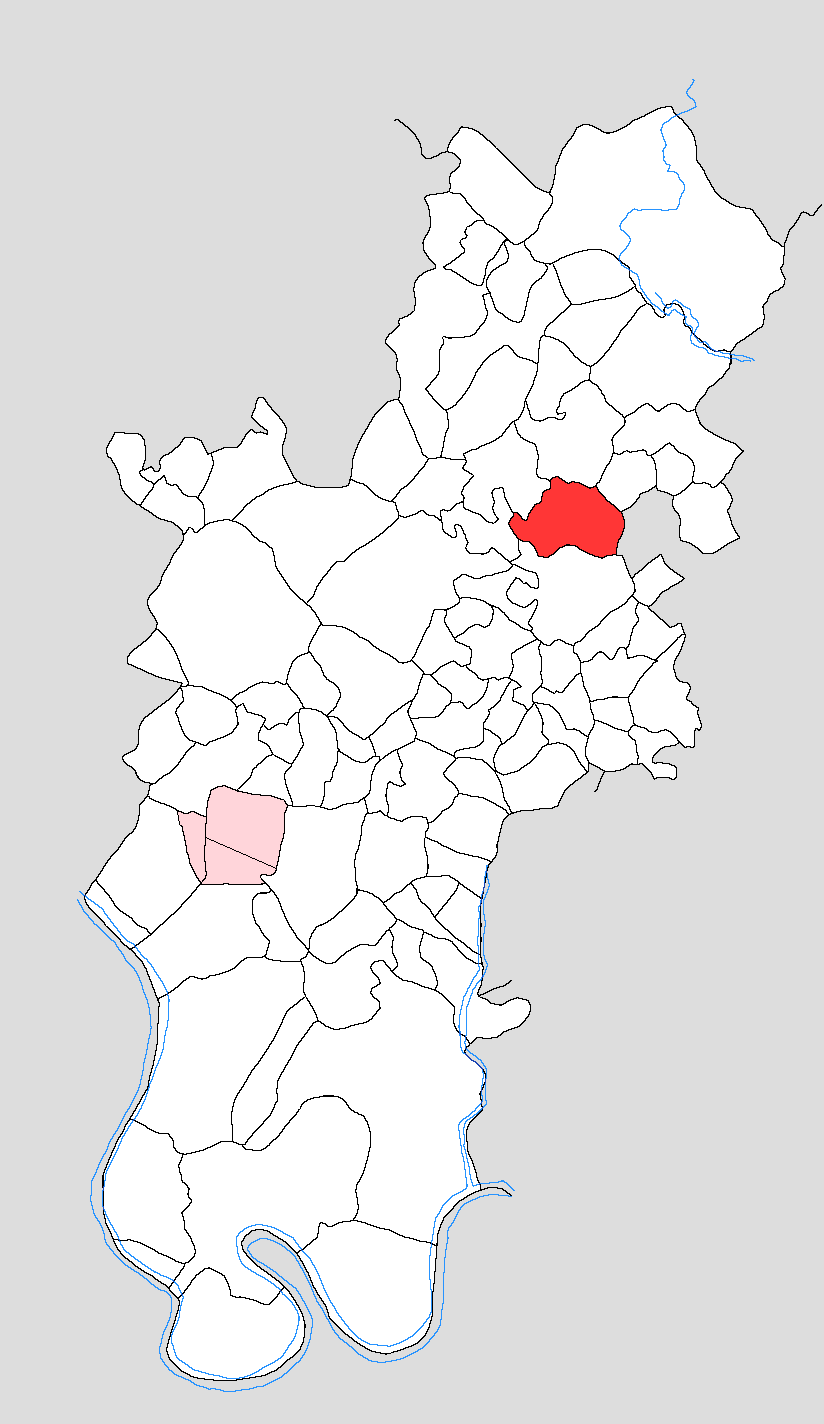
- Map showing Mohammadi in Tundla block

- Location in Uttar Pradesh, India
- Coordinates: 27.29496°N 78.32409°E
- Country: India
- State: Uttar Pradesh
- District: Firozabad
- Tehsil: Tundla

Area
  - Total: 4.637 km^{2} (1.790 sq mi)

Population (2011)
  - Total: 4,507
  - Density: 972.0/km^{2} (2,517/sq mi)
- Time zone: UTC+5:30 (IST)
- PIN: 283204

Mohammadi (Mohammadī) is a village in Tundla block of Firozabad district, Uttar Pradesh. As of 2011, it has a population of 4,507, in 680 households.

== Demographics ==
As of 2011, Mohammadi had a population of 4,507, in 680 households. This population was 52.7% male (2,375) and 47.3% female (2,132). The 0-6 age group numbered 718 (390 male and 328 female), making up 15.9% of the total population. 1,709 residents were members of Scheduled Castes, or 37.9% of the total.

The 1981 census recorded Mohammadi as having a population of 2,687 people (1,473 male and 1,214 female), in 444 households and 442 physical houses. It was then counted as part of Kotla block.

The 1961 census recorded Mohammadi as comprising 6 hamlets, with a total population of 2,601 people (1,398 male and 1,203 female), in 444 households and 326 physical houses. The area of the village was given as 1,545 acres and it had a post office and medical practitioner at that point. It was then counted as part of Kotla block.

== Infrastructure ==
As of 2011, Mohammadi had 1 primary school; it did not have any healthcare facilities. Drinking water was provided by hand pump; there were no public toilets. The village did not have a post office or public library; there was at least some access to electricity for all purposes. Streets were made of both kachcha and pakka materials.
