= Garhi Sidhari =

Village in Uttar Pradesh, India

- Village
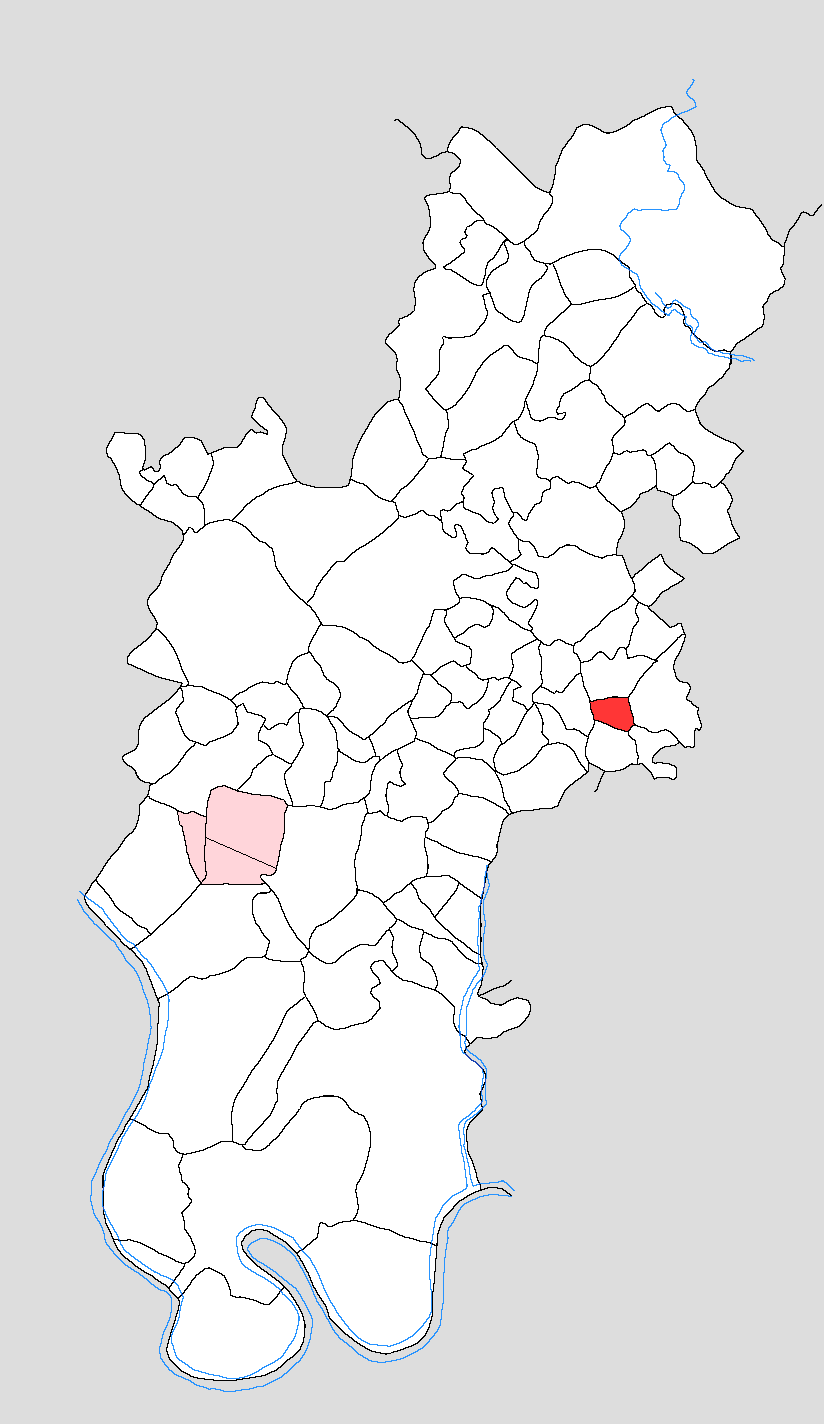
- Map showing Garhi Sidhari in Tundla block

- Location in Uttar Pradesh, India
- Coordinates: 27.24441°N 78.34075°E
- Country: India
- State: Uttar Pradesh
- District: Firozabad
- Tehsil: Tundla

Area
  - Total: 0.809 km^{2} (0.312 sq mi)

Population (2011)
  - Total: 1,678
  - Density: 2,070/km^{2} (5,370/sq mi)
- Time zone: UTC+5:30 (IST)

Garhi Sidhari (Gaṛhī Sidhārī) is a village in Tundla block of Firozabad district, Uttar Pradesh. As of 2011, it has a population of 1,678, in 285 households.

== Demographics ==
As of 2011, Garhi Sidhari had a population of 1,678, in 285 households. This population was 53.9% male (904) and 46.1% female (774). The 0–6 age group numbered 321 (167 male and 154 female), making up 19.1% of the total population. 546 residents were members of Scheduled Castes, or 32.5% of the total.

The 1981 census of India recorded Garhi Sidhari as having a population of 983 people (548 male and 435 female) in 115 households and 115 physical houses. It was then counted as part of the Kotla block.

The 1961 census of India recorded Garhi Sidhari as consisting of one hamlet, with a total population of 722 people (369 male and 353 female) in 122 households and 99 physical houses. The area of the village was given as 200 acres and it was then counted as part of Kotla block.

== Infrastructure ==
As of 2011, Garhi Sidhari had one primary school. A government hospital with doctors appointed by the district commission was opening soon. Drinking water was provided by hand pump. There were also toilet facilities in every household since most people prefer to defecate in toilets rather than in the open. The village did not have a post office or public library. There was access to electricity for all purposes. Streets were made of both kachcha and pakka materials. Most roads are broken so some people are facing road problems.
