= Sakhawatpur =

Village in Uttar Pradesh, India

- Village
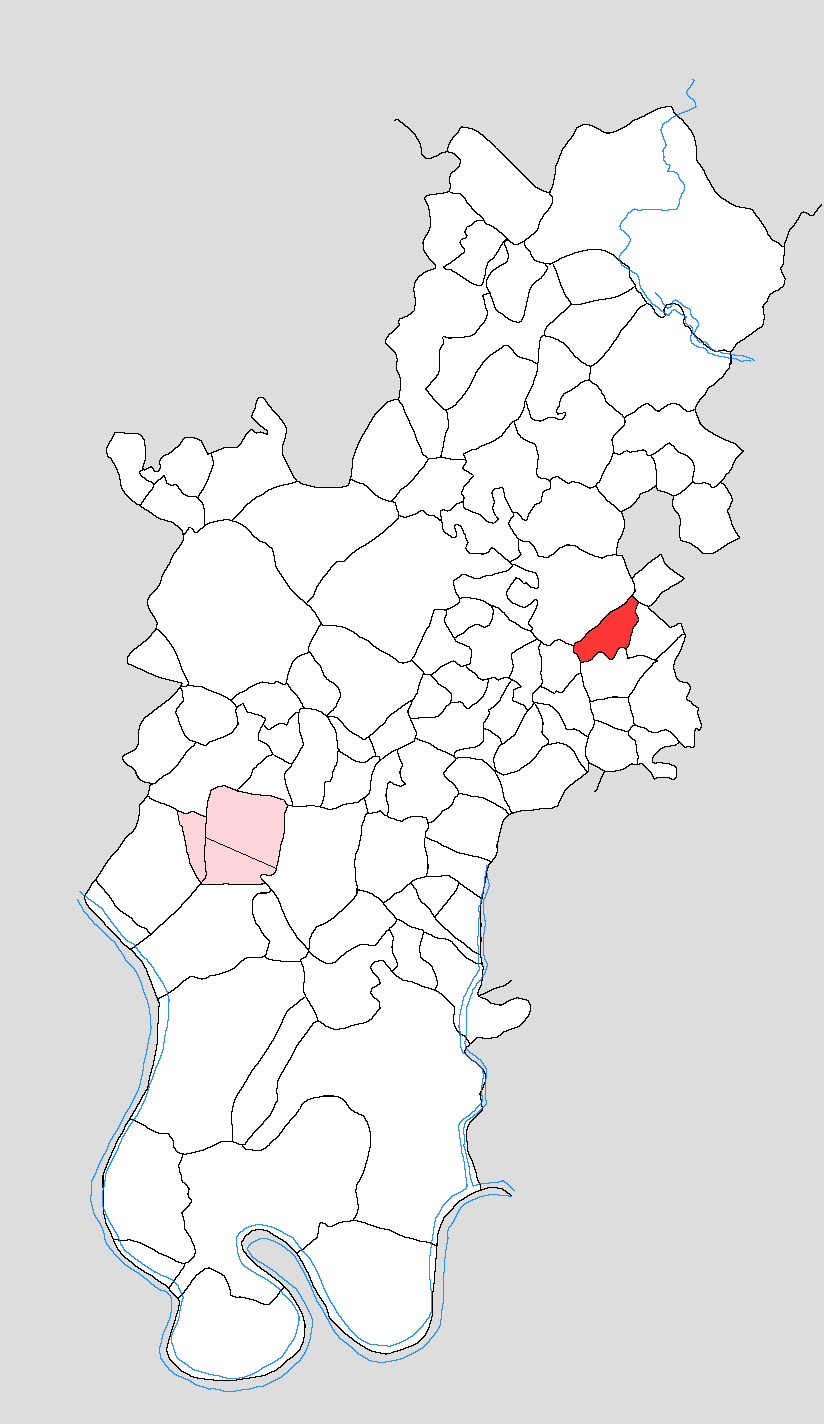
- Map showing Sakhawatpur in Tundla block

- Location in Uttar Pradesh, India
- Coordinates: 27.26195°N 78.33704°E
- Country: India
- State: Uttar Pradesh
- District: Firozabad
- Tehsil: Tundla

Area
  - Total: 1.583 km^{2} (0.611 sq mi)

Population (2011)
  - Total: 833
  - Density: 526/km^{2} (1,360/sq mi)
- Time zone: UTC+5:30 (IST)

Sakhawatpur (Sakhāwatpur) is a village in Tundla block of Firozabad district, Uttar Pradesh. As of 2011, it has a population of 833, in 147 households.

== Demographics ==
As of 2011, Sakhawatpur had a population of 833, in 147 households. This population was 55.3% male (461) and 44.7% female (372). The 0-6 age group numbered 111 (66 male and 45 female), making up 13.3% of the total population. 149 residents were members of Scheduled Castes, or 17.9% of the total.

The 1981 census recorded Sakhawatpur as having a population of 604 people (333 male and 271 female), in 108 households and 102 physical houses. It was then counted as part of Kotla block.

The 1961 census recorded Sakhawatpur as comprising 1 hamlet, with a total population of 562 people (288 male and 274 female), in 100 households and 88 physical houses. The area of the village was given as 398 acres and it was then counted as part of Kotla block.

== Infrastructure ==
As of 2011, Sakhawatpur had 1 primary school; it did not have any healthcare facilities. Drinking water was provided by hand pump; there were no public toilets. The village did not have a post office or public library; there was at least some access to electricity for all purposes. Streets were made of both kachcha and pakka materials.
