= Hardaspur Kotla =

Village in Uttar Pradesh, India

Hardaspur
- Village
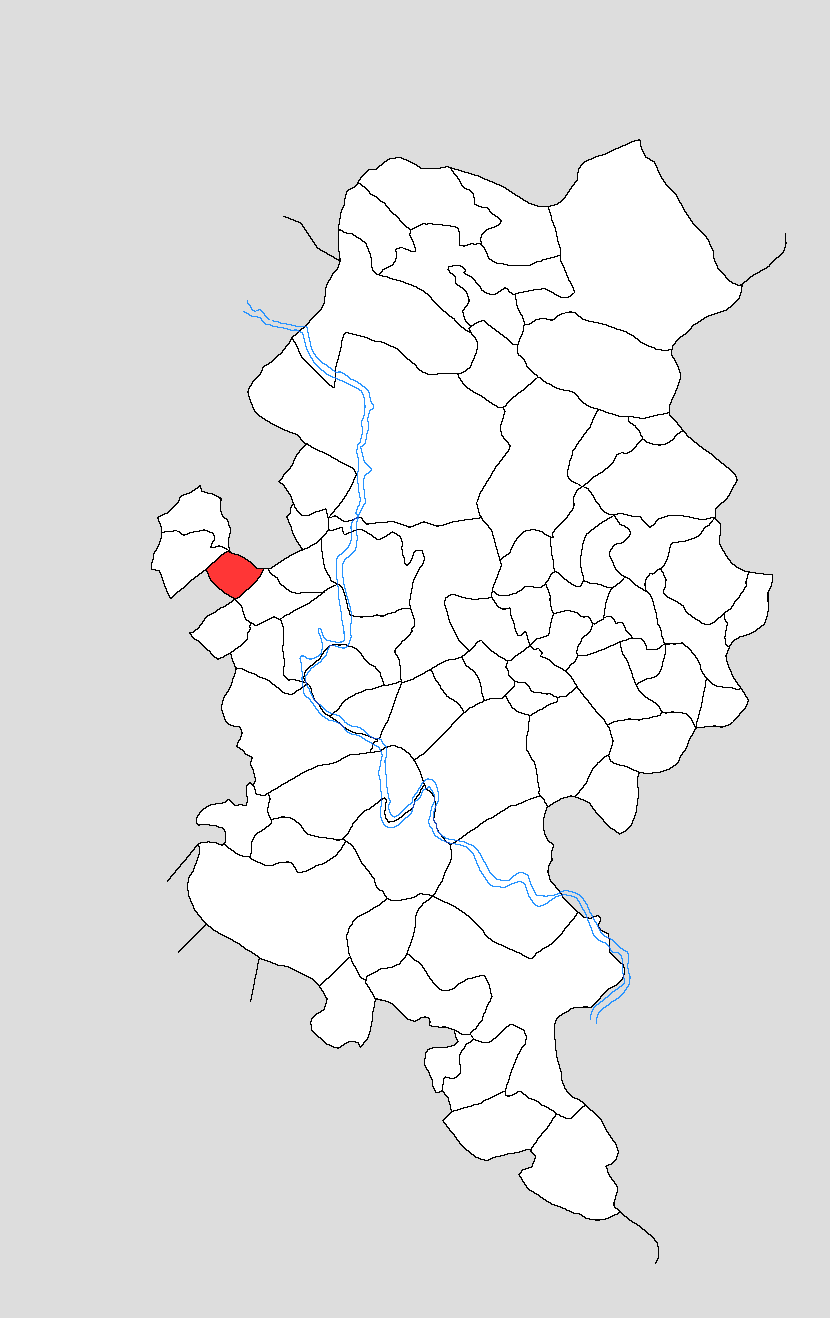
- Map showing Hardaspur Kotla in Kotla block

- Location in Uttar Pradesh, India
- Coordinates: 27.27991°N 78.37189°E
- Country: India
- State: Uttar Pradesh
- District: Firozabad
- Tehsil: Firozabad

Area
  - Total: 1.193 km^{2} (0.461 sq mi)

Population (2011)
  - Total: 1,189
  - Density: 996.6/km^{2} (2,581/sq mi)
- Time zone: UTC+5:30 (IST)

Hardaspur Kotla (Hardāspur Koṭlā) is a village in Kotla block of Firozabad district, Uttar Pradesh, India. As of 2011, it had a population of 1,189, in 181 households.

== Demographics ==
As of 2011, Hardaspur Kotla had a population of 1,189, in 181 households. This population was 53.4% male (635) and 46.6% female (554). The 0-6 age group numbered 196 (112 male and 84 female), making up 16.5% of the total population. 260 residents were members of Scheduled Castes, or 21.9% of the total.

The 1981 census recorded Hardaspur Kotla as having a population of 565 people (328 male and 237 female), in 83 households and 83 physical houses.

The 1961 census recorded Hardaspur Kotla as comprising 1 hamlet, with a total population of 372 people (199 male and 173 female), in 63 households and 61 physical houses. The area of the village was given as 297 acres.

== Infrastructure ==
As of 2011, Hardaspur Kotla had 1 primary school; it did not have any healthcare facilities. Drinking water was provided by hand pump and tube well/borehole; there were no public toilets. The village did not have a post office or public library; there was at least some access to electricity for residential and agricultural (but not commercial) purposes. Streets were made of pakka materials.
