= Nepai =

Village in Uttar Pradesh, India

- Village
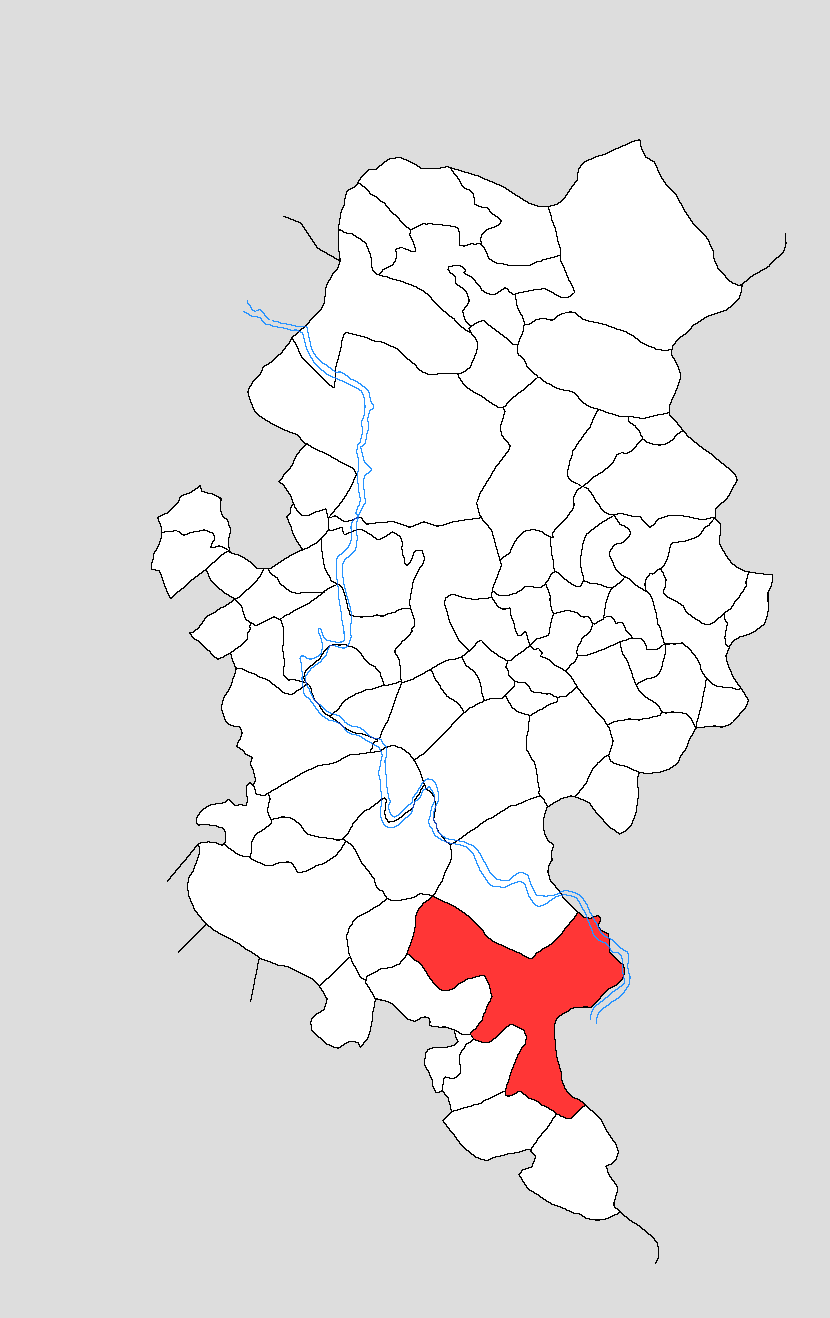
- Map showing Nepai in Kotla block

- Location in Uttar Pradesh, India
- Coordinates: 27.20069°N 78.4331°E
- Country: India
- State: Uttar Pradesh
- District: Firozabad
- Tehsil: Firozabad

Area
  - Total: 10.843 km^{2} (4.187 sq mi)

Population (2011)
  - Total: 10,455
  - Density: 964.22/km^{2} (2,497.3/sq mi)
- Time zone: UTC+5:30 (IST)
- PIN: 283203

Nepai (Nepaī) is a village in Kotla block of Firozabad district, Uttar Pradesh. As of 2011, it has a population of 10,455, in 1,666 households.

== Demographics ==
As of 2011, Nepai had a population of 10,455, in 1,666 households. This population was 54.8% male (5,727) and 45.2% female (4,728). The 0-6 age group numbered 1,668 (902 male and 766 female), making up 16.0% of the total population. 3,013 residents were members of Scheduled Castes, or 28.8% of the total.

The 1981 census recorded Nepai as having a population of 5,439 people (2,974 male and 2,465 female), in 733 households and 731 physical houses.

The 1961 census recorded Nepai (as "Naipai") as comprising 10 hamlets, with a total population of 3,063 people (1,641 male and 1,422 female), in 525 households and 364 physical houses. The area of the village was given as 2,642 acres and it had a post office and medical practitioner at that point.

== Infrastructure ==
As of 2011, Nepai had 2 primary schools and 1 primary health sub centre and veterinary hospital. Drinking water was provided by tap, hand pump, and tube well/borehole; there were no public toilets. The village had a sub post office but no public library; there was at least some access to electricity for residential and agricultural (but not commercial) purposes. Streets were made of both kachcha and pakka materials.
