= Garhi Shriram =

Village in Uttar Pradesh, India

- Village
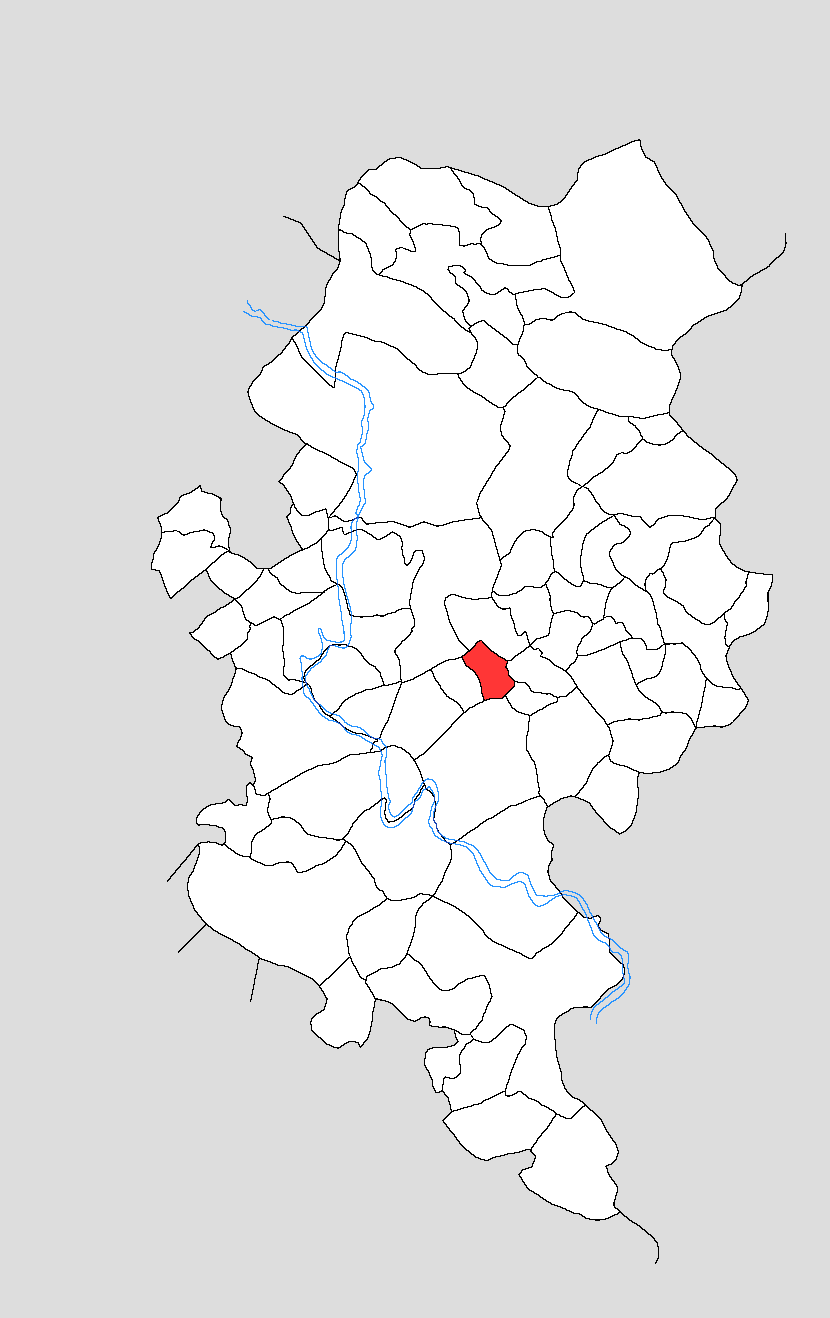
- Map showing Garhi Shriram in Kotla block

- Location in Uttar Pradesh, India
- Coordinates: 27.2633°N 78.42183°E
- Country: India
- State: Uttar Pradesh
- District: Firozabad
- Tehsil: Firozabad

Area
  - Total: 0.874 km^{2} (0.337 sq mi)

Population (2011)
  - Total: 1,053
  - Density: 1,200/km^{2} (3,120/sq mi)
- Time zone: UTC+5:30 (IST)

Garhi Shriram (Gaṛhī Śrīrām) is a village in Kotla block of Firozabad district, Uttar Pradesh, India. As of 2011, it has a population of 1,053, in 177 households.

== Demographics ==
As of 2011, Garhi Shriram had a population of 1,053, in 177 households. This population was 54.9% male (578) and 45.1% female (475). The 0-6 age group numbered 167 (99 male and 68 female), making up 15.9% of the total population. 173 residents were members of Scheduled Castes, or 16.4% of the total.

The 1981 census recorded Garhi Shriram as having a population of 620 people (343 male and 277 female), in 102 households and 98 physical houses.

The 1961 census recorded Garhi Shriram (as "Garhi Sriram") as comprising 1 hamlet, with a total population of 423 people (225 male and 198 female), in 79 households and 52 physical houses. The area of the village was given as 215 acres.

== Infrastructure ==
As of 2011, Garhi Shriram had 1 primary school; it did not have any healthcare facilities. Drinking water was provided by hand pump and tube well/borehole; there were no public toilets. The village did not have a post office or public library; there was at least some access to electricity for all purposes. Streets were made of both kachcha and pakka materials.
