= Badanpur, Kotla =

Village in Uttar Pradesh, India

Badanpur
- Village
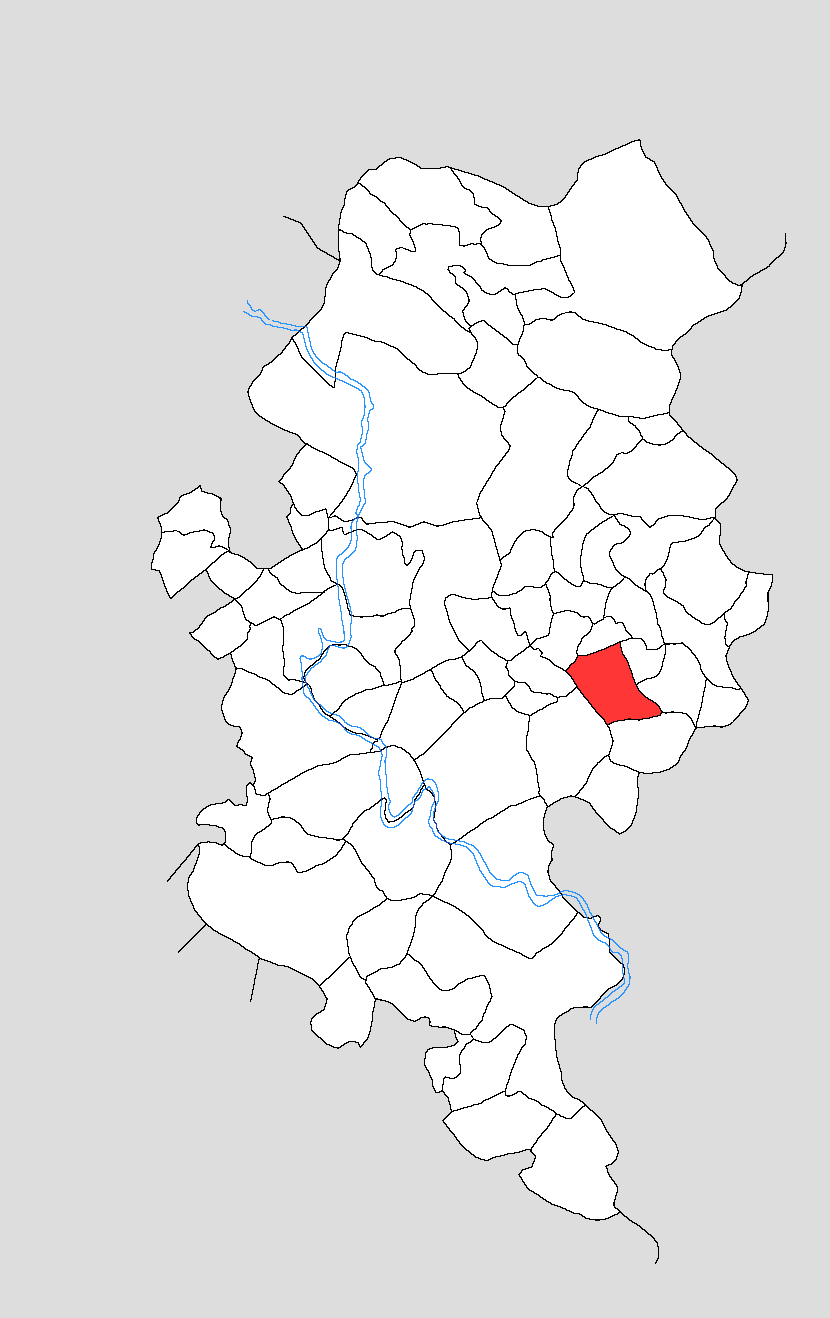
- Map showing Badanpur in Kotla block

- Location in Uttar Pradesh, India
- Coordinates: 27.26526°N 78.44822°E
- Country: India
- State: Uttar Pradesh
- District: Firozabad
- Tehsil: Firozabad

Area
  - Total: 1.763 km^{2} (0.681 sq mi)

Population (2011)
  - Total: 983
  - Density: 558/km^{2} (1,440/sq mi)
- Time zone: UTC+5:30 (IST)
- PIN: 283203

Badanpur (Badanpur) is a village in Kotla block of Firozabad district, Uttar Pradesh. As of 2011, it has a population of 983, in 160 households.

== Demographics ==
As of 2011, Badanpur had a population of 983, in 160 households. This population was 50.7% male (498) and 49.3% female (485). The 0-6 age group numbered 154 (82 male and 72 female), making up 15.7% of the total population. 266 residents were members of Scheduled Castes, or 27.1% of the total.

The 1981 census recorded Badanpur as having a population of 379 people (212 male and 167 female), in 65 households and 65 physical houses.

The 1961 census recorded Badanpur as comprising 1 hamlet, with a total population of 230 people (129 male and 101 female), in 39 households and 36 physical houses. The area of the village was given as 452 acres.

== Infrastructure ==
As of 2011, Badanpur had 1 primary school; it did not have any healthcare facilities. Drinking water was provided by tap, hand pump, and tube well/borehole; there were no public toilets. The village did not have a post office or public library; there was at least some access to electricity for all purposes. Streets were made of both kachcha and pakka materials.
