= Latifpur Kotla =

Village in Uttar Pradesh, India

- Village
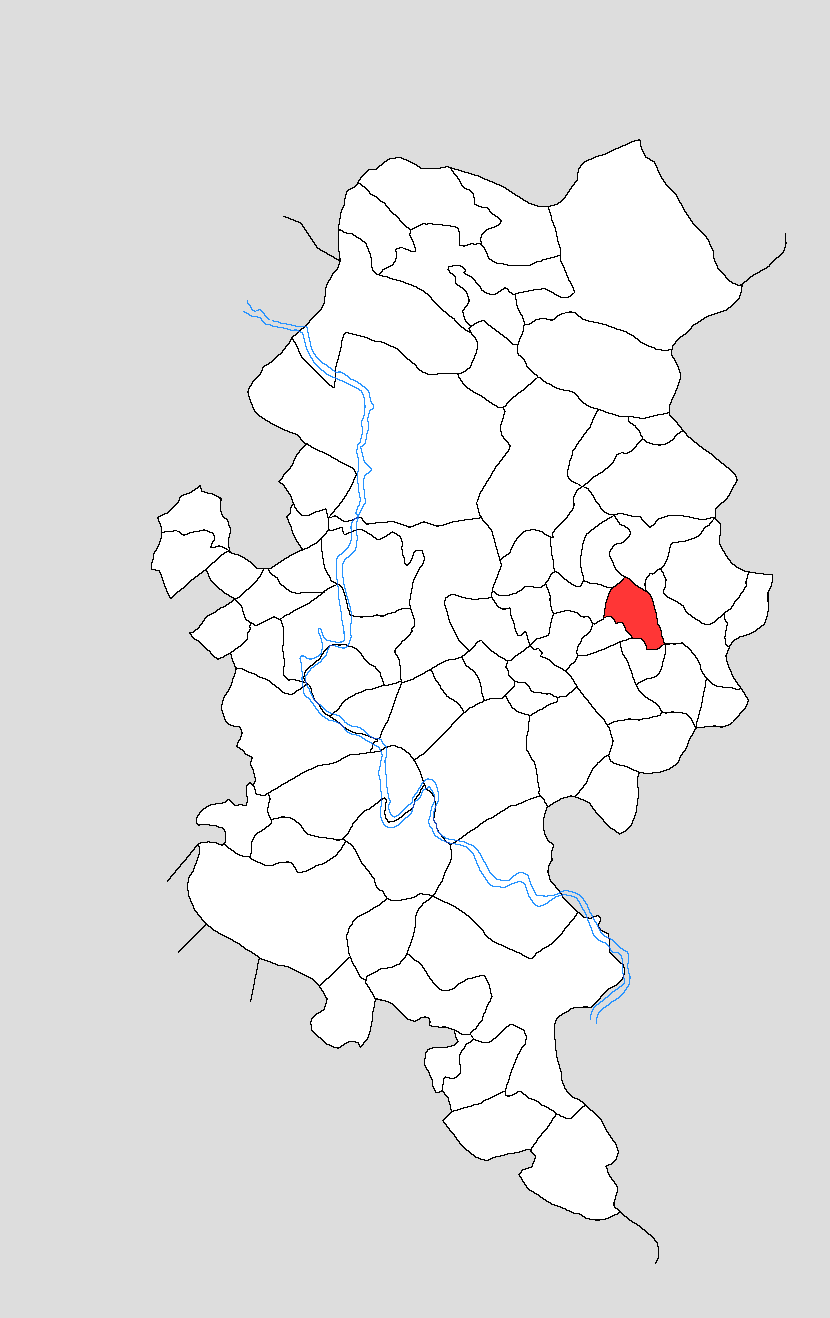
- Map showing Latifpur Kotla in Kotla block

- Location in Uttar Pradesh, India
- Coordinates: 27.27525°N 78.4577°E
- Country: India
- State: Uttar Pradesh
- District: Firozabad
- Tehsil: Firozabad

Area
  - Total: 0.848 km^{2} (0.327 sq mi)

Population (2011)
  - Total: 1,752
  - Density: 2,070/km^{2} (5,350/sq mi)
- Time zone: UTC+5:30 (IST)
- PIN: 283203

Latifpur Kotla (Latīfpur Koṭlā) is a village in Kotla block of Firozabad district, Uttar Pradesh. As of 2011, it has a population of 1,752, in 334 households.

== Demographics ==
As of 2011, Latifpur Kotla had a population of 1,752, in 334 households. This population was 53.1% male (930) and 46.9% female (822). The 0-6 age group numbered 231 (130 male and 101 female), making up 13.2% of the total population. 192 residents were members of Scheduled Castes, or 11.0% of the total.

The 1981 census recorded Latifpur Kotla as having a population of 1,358 people (754 male and 604 female), in 224 households and 218 physical houses.

The 1961 census recorded Latifpur Kotla as comprising 1 hamlet, with a total population of 988 people (533 male and 455 female), in 175 households and 136 physical houses. The area of the village was given as 216 acres and it had a medical practitioner at that point.

== Infrastructure ==
As of 2011, Latifpur Kotla had 1 primary school; it did not have any healthcare facilities. Drinking water was provided by tap, hand pump, and tube well/borehole; there were no public toilets. The village had a public library but no post office; there was at least some access to electricity for all purposes. Streets were made of both kachcha and pakka materials.
