= Lukharia =

Village in Uttar Pradesh, India

- Village
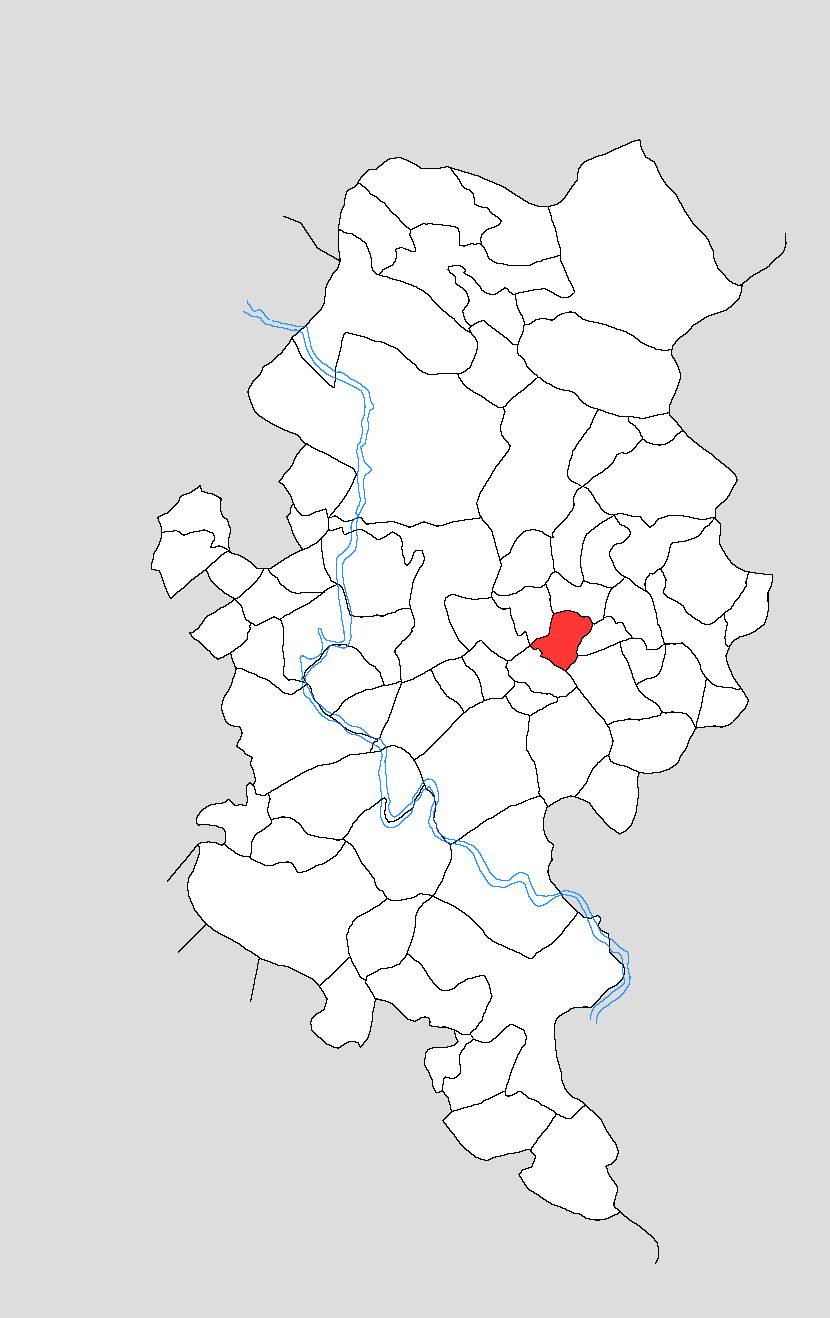
- Map showing Lukharia in Kotla block

- Location in Uttar Pradesh, India
- Coordinates: 27.27211°N 78.43861°E
- Country: India
- State: Uttar Pradesh
- District: Firozabad
- Tehsil: Firozabad

Area
  - Total: 0.971 km^{2} (0.375 sq mi)

Population (2011)
  - Total: 719
  - Density: 740/km^{2} (1,920/sq mi)
- Time zone: UTC+5:30 (IST)

Lukharia (Lukhariyā) is a village in Kotla block of Firozabad district, Uttar Pradesh. As of 2011, it has a population of 719, in 132 households.

== Demographics ==
As of 2011, Lukharia had a population of 719, in 132 households. This population was 51.9% male (373) and 48.1% female (346). The 0-6 age group numbered 123 (69 male and 54 female), making up 17.1% of the total population. 714 residents were members of Scheduled Castes, or 99.3% of the total.

The 1981 census recorded Lukharia as having a population of 333 people (177 male and 156 female), in 61 households and 61 physical houses.

The 1961 census recorded Lukharia as comprising 1 hamlet, with a total population of 248 people (134 male and 114 female), in 37 households and 28 physical houses. The area of the village was given as 244 acres.

== Infrastructure ==
As of 2011, Lukharia had 1 primary school; it did not have any healthcare facilities. Drinking water was provided by hand pump and tube well/borehole; there were no public toilets. The village did not have a post office or public library; there was at least some access to electricity for all purposes. Streets were made of both kachcha and pakka materials.
