= Kheria Kalan =

Village in Uttar Pradesh, India

- Village
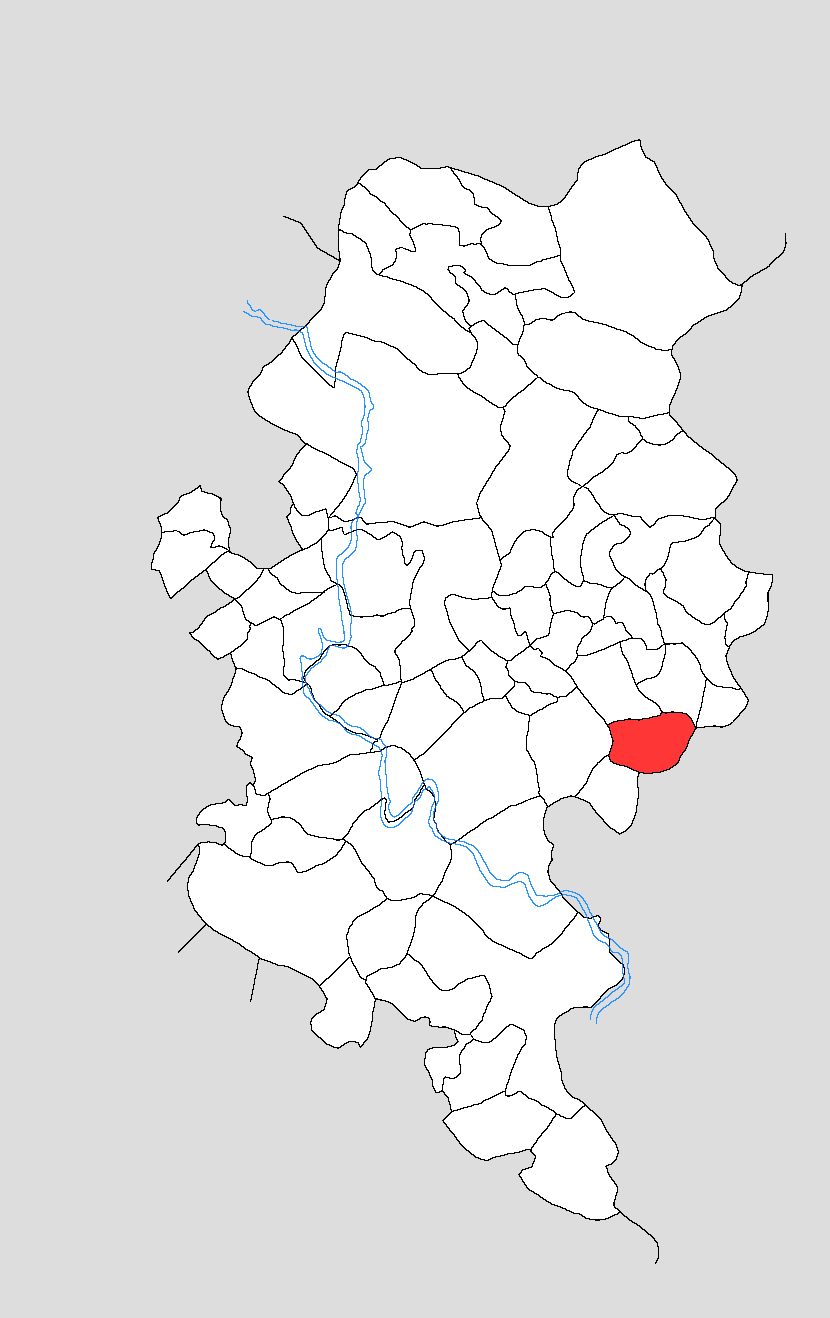
- Map showing Kheria Kalan in Kotla block

- Location in Uttar Pradesh, India
- Coordinates: 27.24867°N 78.45964°E
- Country: India
- State: Uttar Pradesh
- District: Firozabad
- Tehsil: Firozabad

Area
  - Total: 1.531 km^{2} (0.591 sq mi)

Population (2011)
  - Total: 1,384
  - Density: 904.0/km^{2} (2,341/sq mi)
- Time zone: UTC+5:30 (IST)
- PIN: 283203

Kheria Kalan (Kheṛiyā Kalā̃) is a village in Kotla block of Firozabad district, Uttar Pradesh. As of 2011, it has a population of 1,384, in 230 households.

== Demographics ==
As of 2011, Kheria Kalan had a population of 1,384, in 230 households. This population was 55.4% male (767) and 44.6% female (617). The 0-6 age group numbered 183 (98 male and 85 female), making up 13.2% of the total population. 320 residents were members of Scheduled Castes, or 23.1% of the total.

The 1981 census recorded Kheria Kalan as having a population of 633 people (392 male and 271 female), in 130 households and 130 physical houses.

The 1961 census recorded Kheria Kalan as comprising 1 hamlet, with a total population of 388 people (200 male and 188 female), in 63 households and 49 physical houses. The area of the village was given as 422 acres.

== Infrastructure ==
As of 2011, Kheria Kalan had 1 primary school; it did not have any healthcare facilities. Drinking water was provided by tap, hand pump, and tube well/borehole; there were no public toilets. The village did not have a post office or public library; there was at least some access to electricity for residential and agricultural (but not commercial) purposes. Streets were made of both kachcha and pakka materials.
