= Sheola Rampur =

Village in Uttar Pradesh, India

- Village
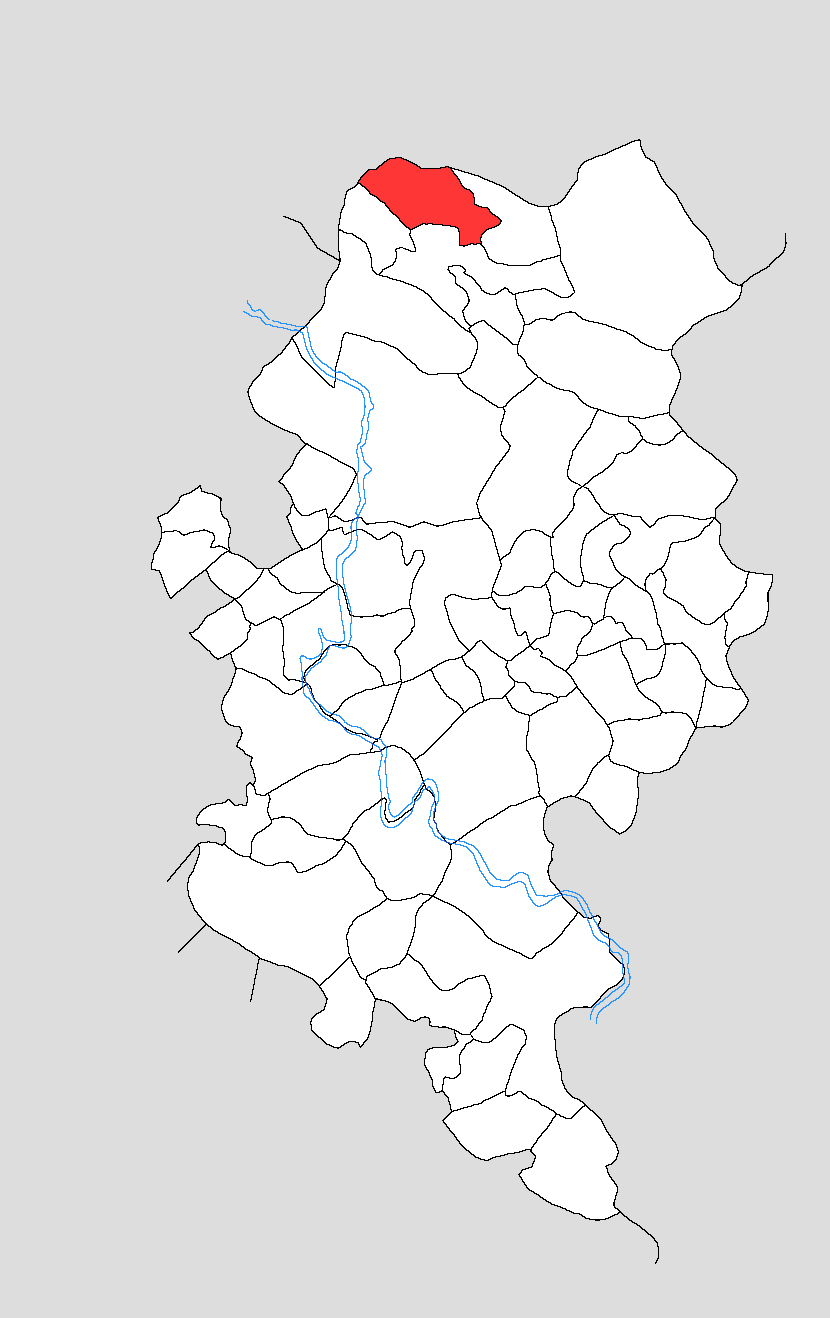
- Map showing Sheola Rampur in Kotla block

- Location in Uttar Pradesh, India
- Coordinates: 27.36232°N 78.4039°E
- Country: India
- State: Uttar Pradesh
- District: Firozabad
- Tehsil: Firozabad

Area
  - Total: 3.38 km^{2} (1.31 sq mi)

Population (2011)
  - Total: 1,567
  - Density: 464/km^{2} (1,200/sq mi)
- Time zone: UTC+5:30 (IST)

Sheola Rampur is a village in Kotla block of Firozabad district, Uttar Pradesh, India. As of 2011, it had a population of 1,567, in 242 households.

== Demographics ==
As of 2011, Sheola Rampur had a population of 1,567, in 242 households. This population was 54.1% male (847) and 45.9% female (720). The 0-6 age group numbered 245 (136 male and 109 female), making up 15.6% of the total population. 546 residents were members of Scheduled Castes, or 34.8% of the total.

The 1981 census recorded Sheola Rampur (as "Seola Rampur") as having a population of 1,119 people (630 male and 485 female), in 192 households and 192 physical houses.

The 1961 census recorded Sheola Rampur as comprising 1 hamlet, with a total population of 812 people (421 male and 391 female), in 154 households and 109 physical houses. The area of the village was given as 844 acres and it had a medical practitioner at that point.

== Infrastructure ==
As of 2011, Sheola Rampur had 1 primary school; it did not have any healthcare facilities. Drinking water was provided by hand pump and tube well/borehole; there were no public toilets. The village did not have a post office or public library; there was at least some access to electricity for all purposes. Streets were made of both kachcha and pakka materials.
