= Garhi Hansram =

Village in Uttar Pradesh, India

- Village
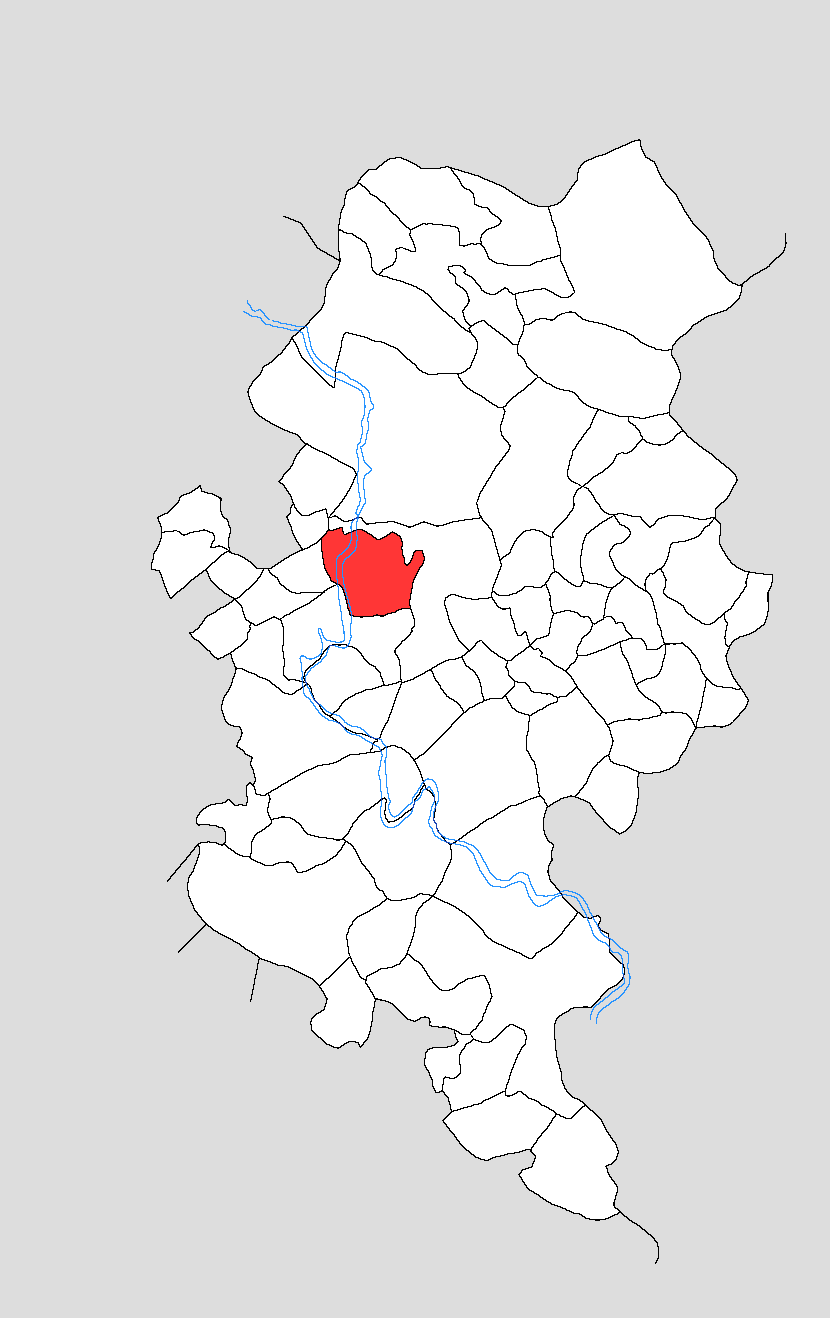
- Map showing Garhi Hansram in Kotla block

- Location in Uttar Pradesh, India
- Coordinates: 27.28558°N 78.3979°E
- Country: India
- State: Uttar Pradesh
- District: Firozabad
- Tehsil: Firozabad

Area
  - Total: 3.027 km^{2} (1.169 sq mi)

Population (2011)
  - Total: 1,713
  - Density: 565.9/km^{2} (1,466/sq mi)
- Time zone: UTC+5:30 (IST)

Garhi Hansram (Gaṛhī Hansrām) is a village in Kotla block of Firozabad district, Uttar Pradesh. As of 2011, it has a population of 1,713, in 271 households.

== Demographics ==
As of 2011, Garhi Hansram had a population of 1,713, in 271 households. This population was 52.6% male (901) and 47.4% female (812). The 0-6 age group numbered 258 (146 male and 112 female), making up 15.1% of the total population. 546 residents were members of Scheduled Castes, or 31.9% of the total.

The 1981 census recorded Garhi Hansram as having a population of 1,012 people (564 male and 448 female), in 166 households and 165 physical houses.

The 1961 census recorded Garhi Hansram as comprising 1 hamlet, with a total population of 735 people (378 male and 357 female), in 125 households and 107 physical houses. The area of the village was given as 770 acres.

== Infrastructure ==
As of 2011, Garhi Hansram had 1 primary school; it did not have any healthcare facilities. Drinking water was provided by hand pump and tube well/borehole; there were no public toilets. The village had a public library but no post office; there was at least some access to electricity for residential and agricultural (but not commercial) purposes. Streets were made of both kachcha and pakka materials.
