= Garhi Baran =

Village in Uttar Pradesh, India

- Village
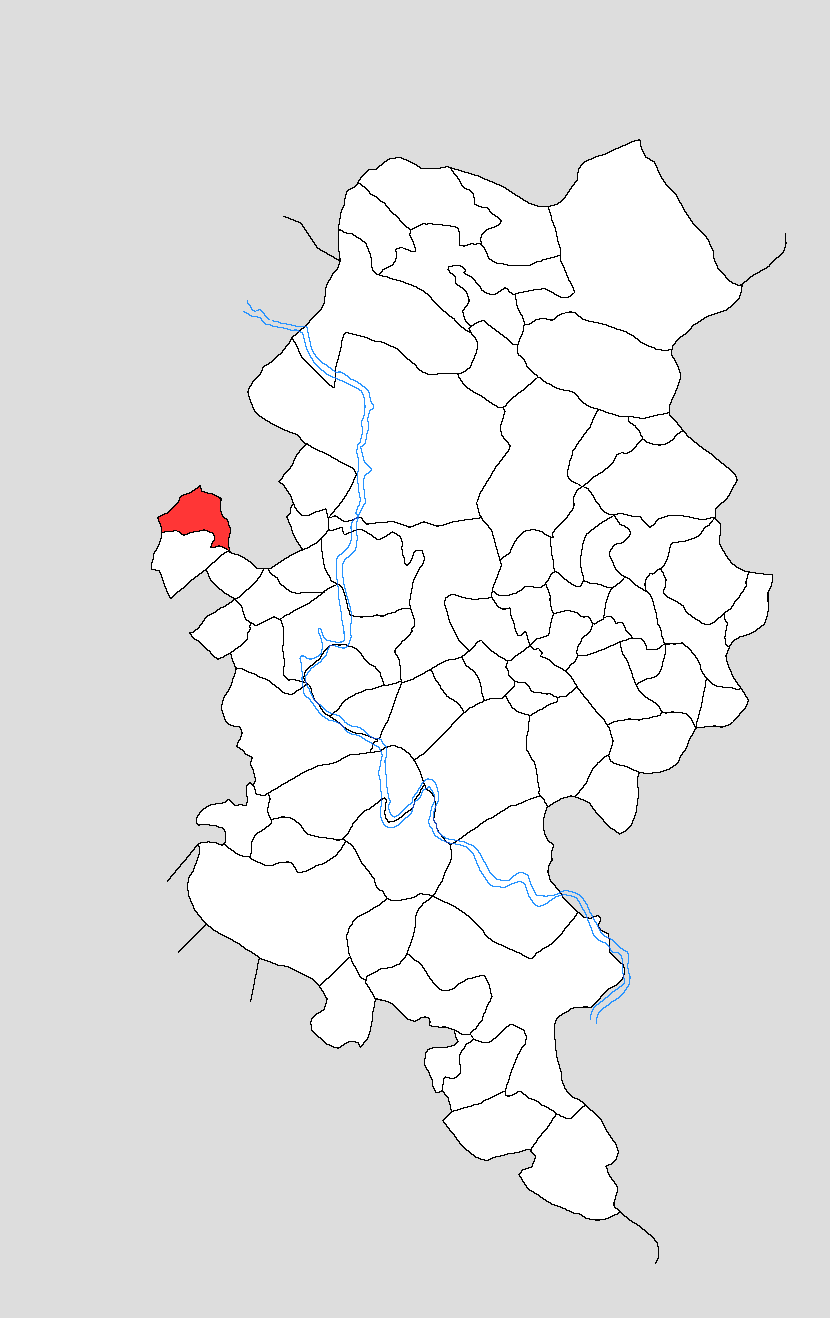
- Map showing Garhi Baran in Kotla block

- Location in Uttar Pradesh, India
- Coordinates: 27.29659°N 78.34772°E
- Country: India
- State: Uttar Pradesh
- District: Firozabad
- Tehsil: Firozabad

Area
  - Total: 1.458 km^{2} (0.563 sq mi)

Population (2011)
  - Total: 728
  - Density: 499/km^{2} (1,290/sq mi)
- Time zone: UTC+5:30 (IST)

Garhi Baran (Gaṛhī Baran) is a village in Kotla block of Firozabad district, Uttar Pradesh. As of 2011, it has a population of 728, in 122 households.

== Demographics ==
As of 2011, Garhi Baran had a population of 728, in 122 households. This population was 52.2% male (380) and 47.8% female (348). The 0-6 age group numbered 119 (65 male and 54 female), making up 16.3% of the total population. 227 residents were members of Scheduled Castes, or 31.2% of the total.

The 1981 census recorded Garhi Baran as having a population of 446 people (240 male and 206 female), in 68 households and 68 physical houses.

The 1961 census recorded Garhi Baran as comprising 1 hamlet, with a total population of 287 people (154 male and 133 female), in 49 households and 32 physical houses. The area of the village was given as 322 acres.

== Infrastructure ==
As of 2011, Garhi Baran had 1 primary school; it did not have any healthcare facilities. Drinking water was provided by hand pump and tube well/borehole; there were no public toilets. The village did not have a post office or public library; there was at least some access to electricity for residential and agricultural (but not commercial) purposes. Streets were made of both kachcha and pakka materials.
