= Kheria Khurd =

Village in Uttar Pradesh, India

- Village
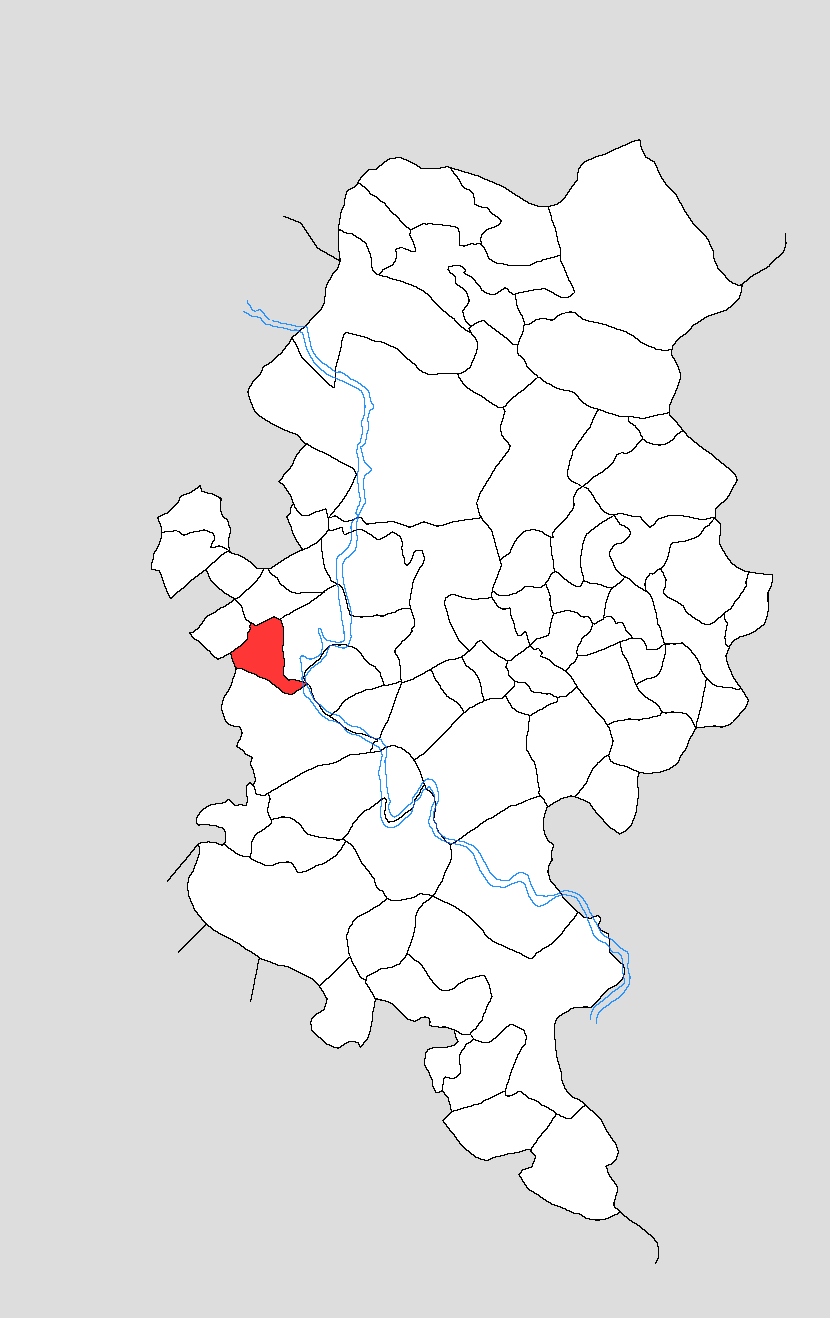
- Map showing Kheria Khurd in Kotla block

- Location in Uttar Pradesh, India
- Coordinates: 27.27208°N 78.3659°E
- Country: India
- State: Uttar Pradesh
- District: Firozabad
- Tehsil: Firozabad

Area
  - Total: 1.18 km^{2} (0.46 sq mi)

Population (2011)
  - Total: 465
  - Density: 394/km^{2} (1,020/sq mi)
- Time zone: UTC+5:30 (IST)

Kheria Khurd (Kheṛiyā Khurd) is a village in Kotla block of Firozabad district, Uttar Pradesh, India. As of 2011, it had a population of 465, in 85 households.

== Demographics ==
As of 2011, Kheria Khurd had a population of 465, in 85 households. This population was 52.7% male (245) and 47.3% female (220). The 0-6 age group numbered 83 (43 male and 40 female), making up 17.8% of the total population. 247 residents were members of Scheduled Castes, or 53.1% of the total.

The 1981 census recorded Kheria Khurd as having a population of 301 people (161 male and 140 female), in 57 households and 55 physical houses.

The 1961 census recorded Kheria Khurd as comprising 1 hamlet, with a total population of 207 people (116 male and 91 female), in 54 households and 50 physical houses. The area of the village was given as 292 acres.

== Infrastructure ==
As of 2011, Kheria Khurd had 1 primary school; it did not have any healthcare facilities. Drinking water was provided by hand pump; there were no public toilets. The village did not have a post office or public library; there was at least some access to electricity for all purposes. Streets were made of both kachcha and pakka materials.
