= Sunawai =

Village in Uttar Pradesh, India

- Village
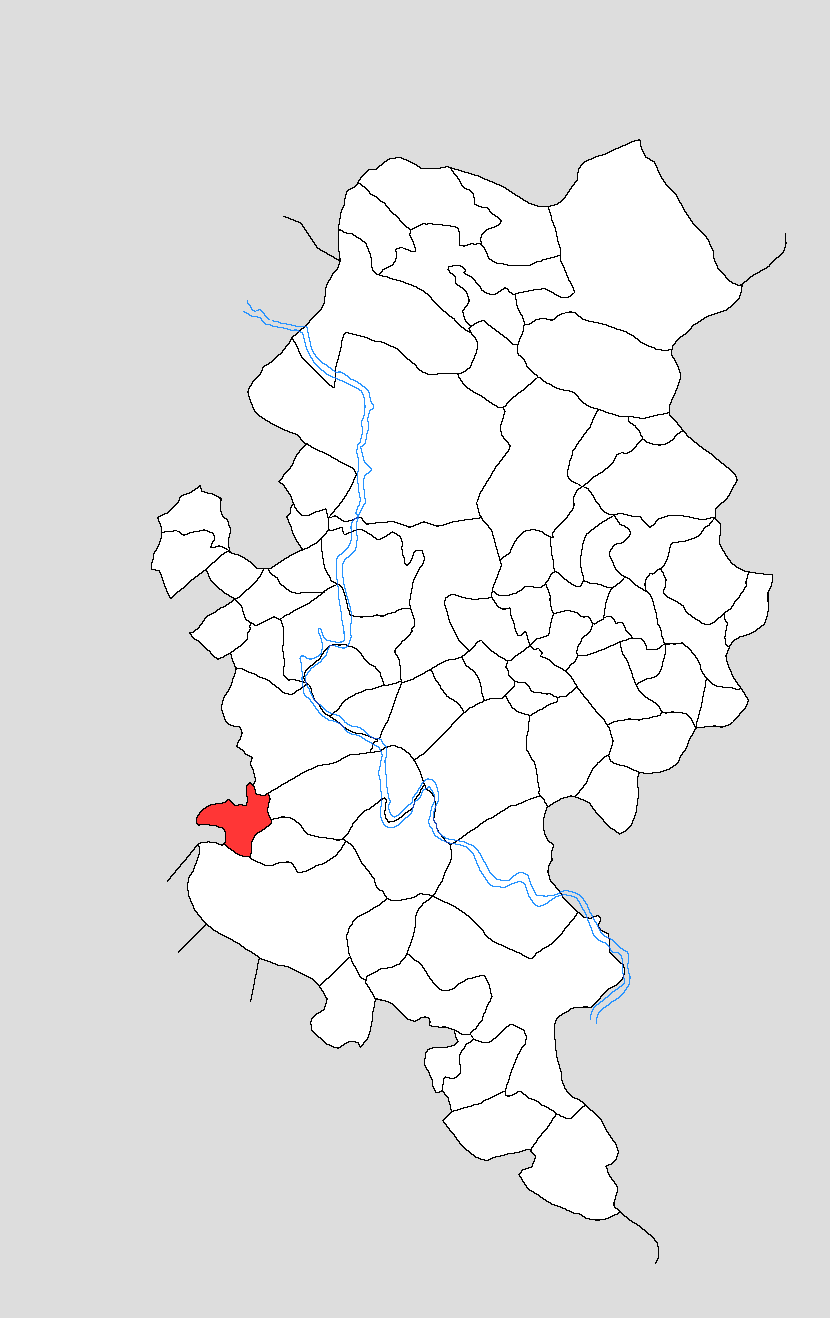
- Map showing Sunawai in Kotla block

- Location in Uttar Pradesh, India
- Coordinates: 27.23347°N 78.36313°E
- Country: India
- State: Uttar Pradesh
- District: Firozabad
- Tehsil: Firozabad

Area
  - Total: 1.404 km^{2} (0.542 sq mi)

Population (2011)
  - Total: 783
  - Density: 558/km^{2} (1,440/sq mi)
- Time zone: UTC+5:30 (IST)
- PIN: 283203

Sunawai (Sunāwaī) is a village in Kotla block of Firozabad district, Uttar Pradesh, India. As of 2011, it had a population of 783, in 127 households.

== Demographics ==
As of 2011, Sunawai had a population of 783, in 127 households. This population was 50.8% male (398) and 49.2% female (385). The 0-6 age group numbered 129 (75 male and 54 female), making up 16.5% of the total population. 191 residents were members of Scheduled Castes, or 24.4% of the total.

The 1981 census recorded Sunawai as having a population of 513 people (284 male and 229 female), in 87 households and 86 physical houses.

The 1961 census recorded Sunawai as comprising 1 hamlet, with a total population of 357 people (206 male and 151 female), in 61 households and 42 physical houses. The area of the village was given as 369 acres.

== Infrastructure ==
As of 2011, Sunawai had 1 primary school; it did not have any healthcare facilities. Drinking water was provided by tap, hand pump, and tube well/borehole; there were no public toilets. The village did not have a post office or public library; there was at least some access to electricity for residential and agricultural (but not commercial) purposes. Streets were made of both kachcha and pakka materials.
