= Gonchh =

Village in Uttar Pradesh, India

- Village
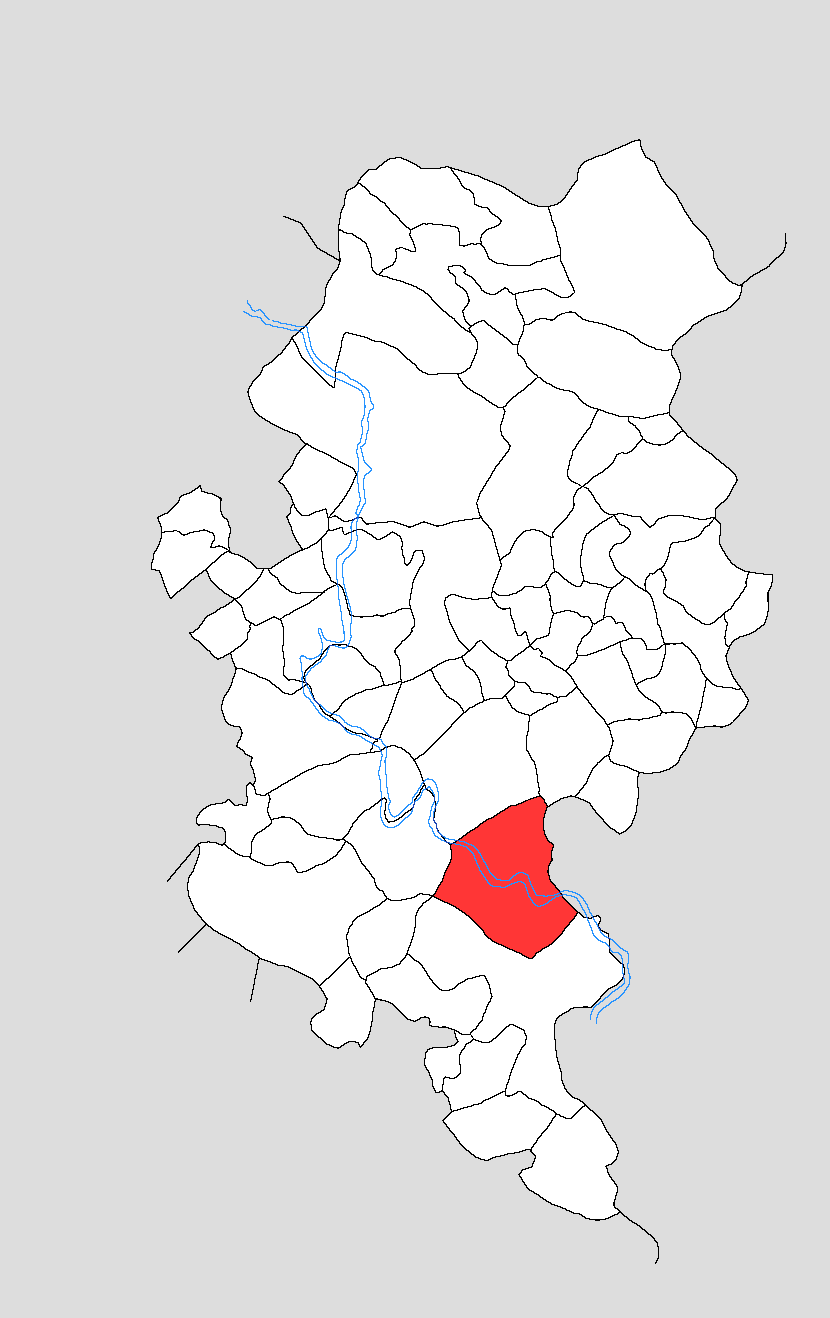
- Map showing Gonchh in Kotla block

- Location in Uttar Pradesh, India
- Coordinates: 27.21924°N 78.42797°E
- Country: India
- State: Uttar Pradesh
- District: Firozabad
- Tehsil: Firozabad

Area
  - Total: 6.493 km^{2} (2.507 sq mi)

Population (2011)
  - Total: 4,273
  - Density: 658.1/km^{2} (1,704/sq mi)
- Time zone: UTC+5:30 (IST)
- PIN: 283203

Gonchh (Goñchh) is a village in Kotla block of Firozabad district, Uttar Pradesh. As of 2011, it has a population of 4,273, in 701 households.

== Demographics ==
As of 2011, Gonchh had a population of 4,273, in 701 households. This population was 53.1% male (2,270) and 46.9% female (2,003). The 0-6 age group numbered 730 (404 male and 326 female), making up 17.1% of the total population. 1,059 residents were members of Scheduled Castes, or 24.8% of the total.

The 1981 census recorded Gonchh as having a population of 2,287 people (1,249 male and 1,038 female), in 388 households and 367 physical houses.

The 1961 census recorded Gonchh as comprising 3 hamlets, with a total population of 1,382 people (739 male and 643 female), in 268 households and 160 physical houses. The area of the village was given as 1,637 acres and it had a post office and medical practitioner at that point.

== Infrastructure ==
As of 2011, Gonchh had 2 primary schools; it did not have any healthcare facilities. Drinking water was provided by tap, hand pump, and tube well/borehole; there were no public toilets. The village had a sub post office but no public library; there was at least some access to electricity for residential and agricultural (but not commercial) purposes. Streets were made of both kachcha and pakka materials.
