= Wazirpur Kotla =

Village in Uttar Pradesh, India

- Village
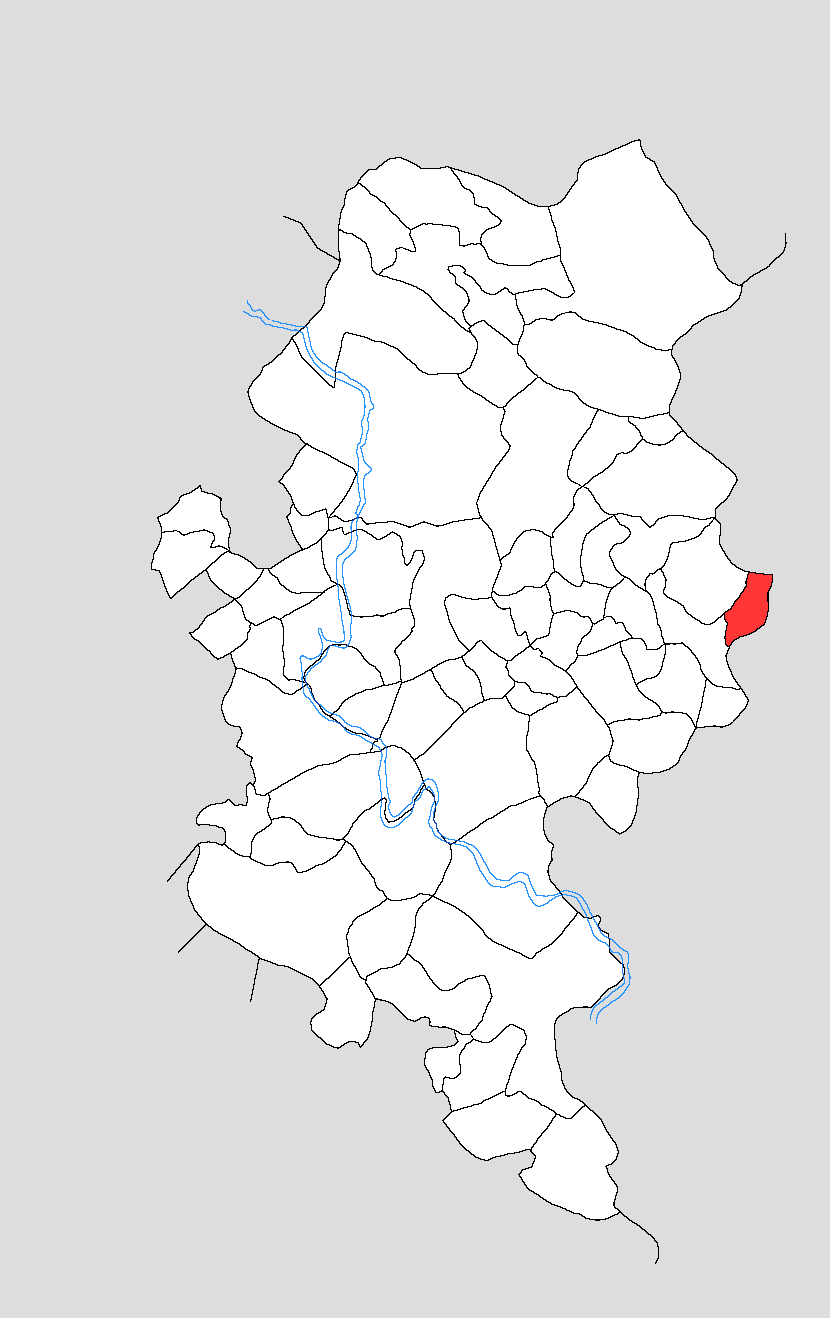
- Map showing Wazirpur Kotla in Kotla block

- Location in Uttar Pradesh, India
- Coordinates: 27.27802°N 78.48079°E
- Country: India
- State: Uttar Pradesh
- District: Firozabad
- Tehsil: Firozabad

Area
  - Total: 1.024 km^{2} (0.395 sq mi)

Population (2011)
  - Total: 1,384
  - Density: 1,352/km^{2} (3,501/sq mi)
- Time zone: UTC+5:30 (IST)
- PIN: 283203

Wazirpur Kotla (Wazīrpur Koṭlā) is a village in Kotla block of Firozabad district, Uttar Pradesh. As of 2011, it has a population of 1,384, in 280 households.

== Demographics ==
As of 2011, Wazirpur Kotla had a population of 1,384, in 280 households. This population was 53.0% male (733) and 47.0% female (651). The 0-6 age group numbered 191 (106 male and 85 female), making up 13.8% of the total population. 660 residents were members of Scheduled Castes, or 47.7% of the total.

The 1981 census recorded Wazirpur Kotla as having a population of 810 people (431 male and 379 female), in 139 households and 135 physical houses.

The 1961 census recorded Wazirpur Kotla (as "Wazidpur Kotla") as comprising 1 hamlet, with a total population of 512 people (270 male and 242 female), in 74 households and 43 physical houses. The area of the village was given as 258 acres.

== Infrastructure ==
As of 2011, Wazirpur Kotla had 1 primary school; it did not have any healthcare facilities. Drinking water was provided by hand pump and tube well/borehole; there were no public toilets. The village did not have a post office or public library; there was at least some access to electricity for all purposes. Streets were made of both kachcha and pakka materials.
