= Daulatpur, Firozabad =

Village in Uttar Pradesh, India

Daulatpur
- Village
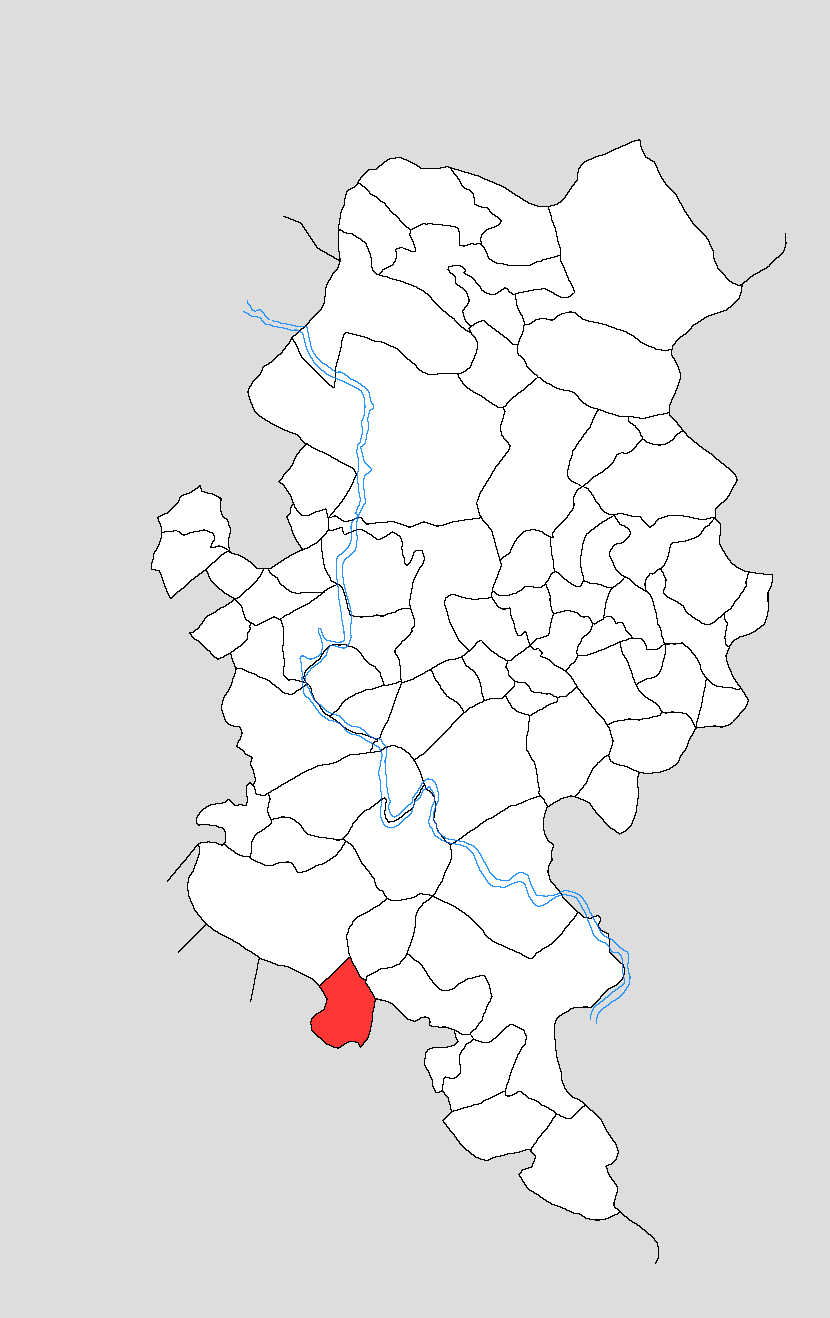
- Map showing Daulatpur in Kotla block

- Location in Uttar Pradesh, India
- Coordinates: 27.19101°N 78.3849°E
- Country: India
- State: Uttar Pradesh
- District: Firozabad
- Tehsil: Firozabad

Area
  - Total: 1.972 km^{2} (0.761 sq mi)

Population (2011)
  - Total: 4,508
  - Density: 2,286/km^{2} (5,921/sq mi)
- Time zone: UTC+5:30 (IST)

Daulatpur (Daulatpur) is a village in Kotla block of Firozabad district, Uttar Pradesh. As of 2011, it has a population of 4,508, in 554 households.

== Demographics ==
As of 2011, Daulatpur had a population of 4,508, in 554 households. This population was 67.5% male (3,043) and 32.5% female (1,465). The 0-6 age group numbered 488 (262 male and 226 female), making up 10.8% of the total population. 856 residents were members of Scheduled Castes, or 19.0% of the total.

The 1981 census recorded Daulatpur as having a population of 1,159 people (624 male and 535 female), in 178 households and 178 physical houses.

The 1961 census recorded Daulatpur as comprising 1 hamlet, with a total population of 698 people (373 male and 325 female), in 122 households and 89 physical houses. The area of the village was given as 487 acres.

== Infrastructure ==
As of 2011, Daulatpur had 3 primary schools; it did not have any healthcare facilities. Drinking water was provided by hand pump and tube well/borehole; there were no public toilets. The village did not have a post office or public library; there was at least some access to electricity for all purposes. Streets were made of both kachcha and pakka materials.
