= Garhi Kalyan =

Village in Uttar Pradesh, India

- Village
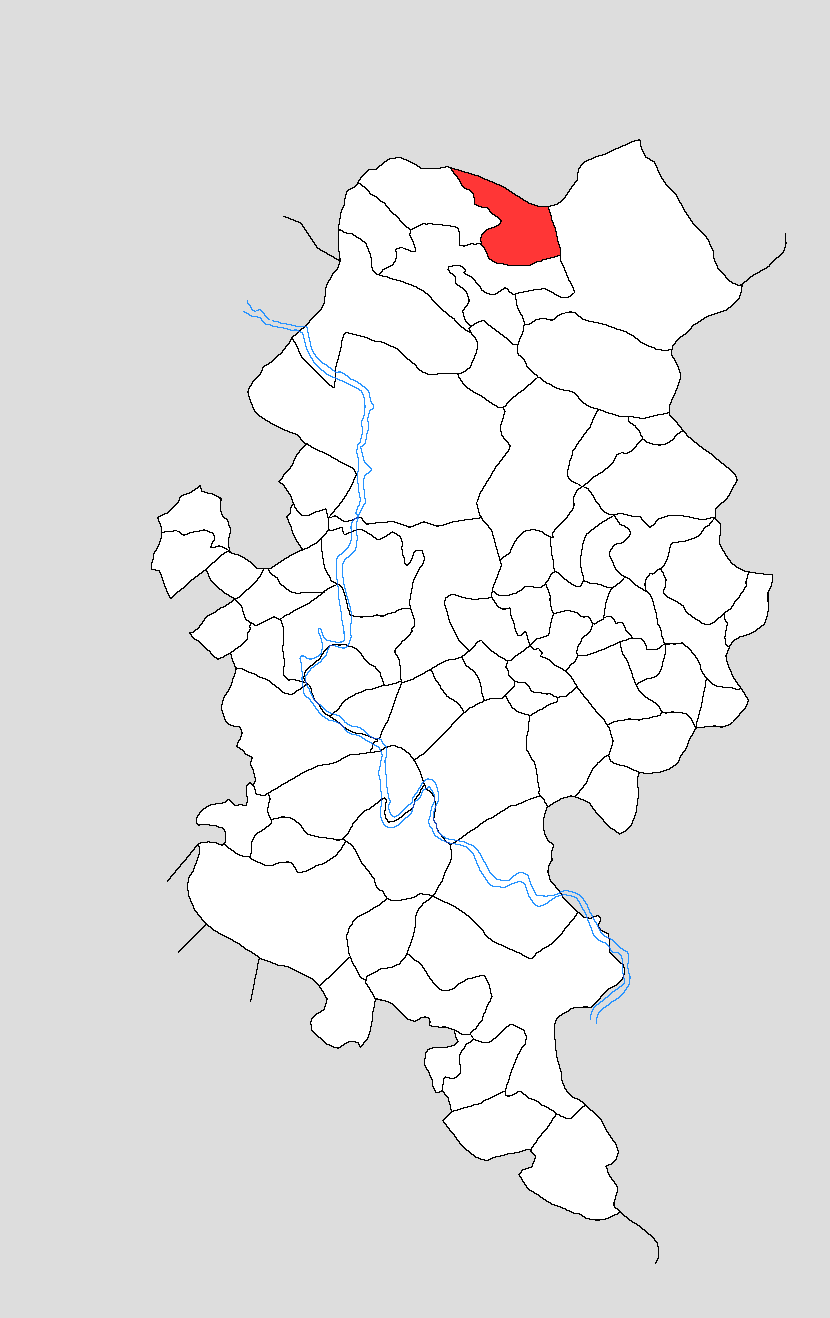
- Map showing Garhi Kalyan in Kotla block

- Location in Uttar Pradesh, India
- Coordinates: 27.35611°N 78.42773°E
- Country: India
- State: Uttar Pradesh
- District: Firozabad
- Tehsil: Firozabad

Area
  - Total: 2.828 km^{2} (1.092 sq mi)

Population (2011)
  - Total: 1,471
  - Density: 520.2/km^{2} (1,347/sq mi)
- Time zone: UTC+5:30 (IST)

Garhi Kalyan (Gaṛhī Kalyān) is a village in Kotla block of Firozabad district, Uttar Pradesh. As of 2011, it has a population of 1,471, in 252 households.

== Demographics ==
As of 2011, Garhi Kalyan had a population of 1,471, in 252 households. This population was 54.5% male (801) and 45.5% female (670). The 0-6 age group numbered 278 (149 male and 129 female), making up 18.9% of the total population. 738 residents were members of Scheduled Castes, or 50.2% of the total.

The 1981 census recorded Garhi Kalyan as having a population of 922 people (504 male and 418 female), in 164 households and 162 physical houses.

The 1961 census recorded Garhi Kalyan as comprising 1 hamlet, with a total population of 528 people (291 male and 237 female), in 115 households and 70 physical houses. The area of the village was given as 715 acres.

== Infrastructure ==
As of 2011, Garhi Kalyan had 1 primary school; it did not have any healthcare facilities. Drinking water was provided by well, hand pump, and tube well/borehole; there were no public toilets. The village did not have a post office or public library; there was at least some access to electricity for all purposes. Streets were made of both kachcha and pakka materials.
