= Pachwan =

Village in Uttar Pradesh, India

- Village
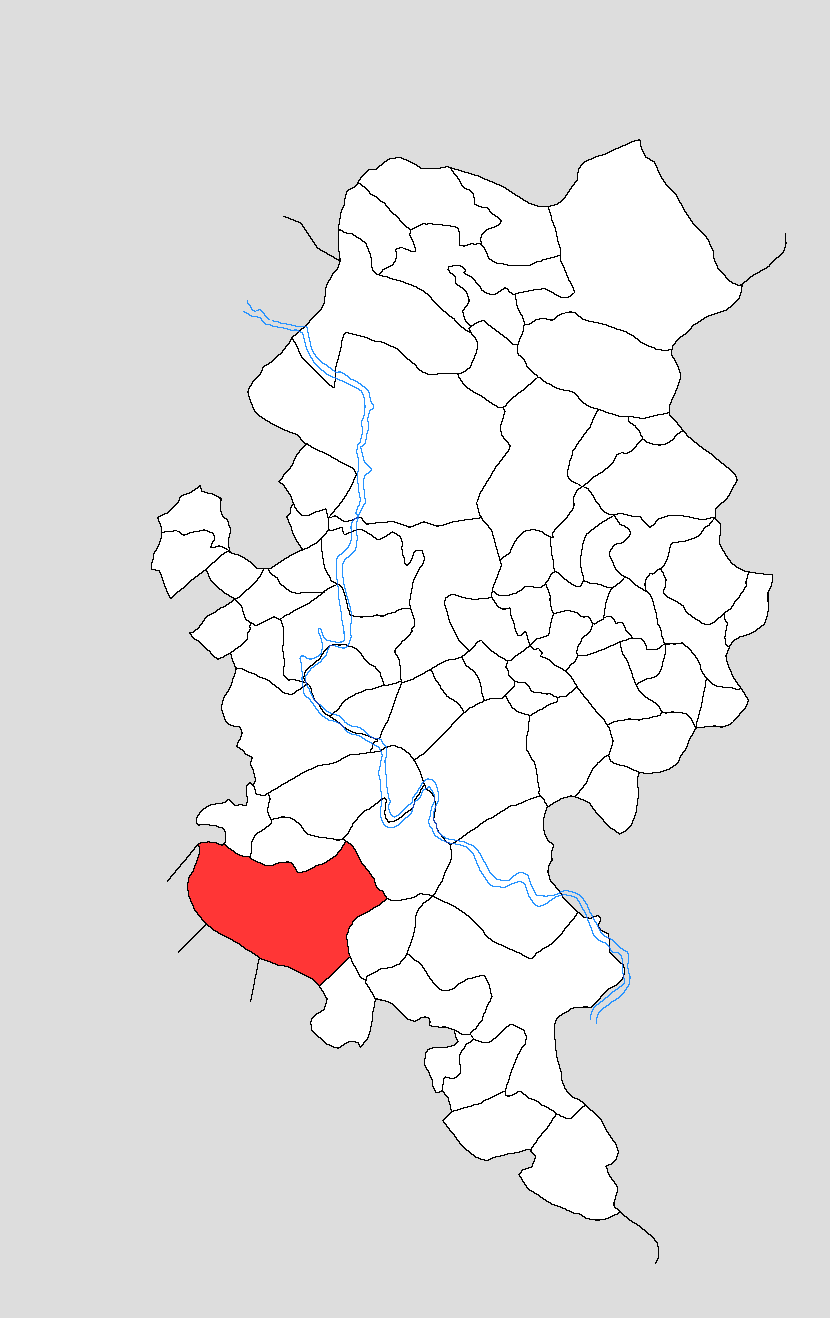
- Map showing Pachwan in Kotla block

- Location in Uttar Pradesh, India
- Coordinates: 27.21565°N 78.37802°E
- Country: India
- State: Uttar Pradesh
- District: Firozabad
- Tehsil: Firozabad

Area
  - Total: 8.094 km^{2} (3.125 sq mi)

Population (2011)
  - Total: 8,259
  - Density: 1,020/km^{2} (2,643/sq mi)
- Time zone: UTC+5:30 (IST)
- PIN: 283203

Pachwan (Pachwān) is a village in Kotla block of Firozabad district, Uttar Pradesh. As of 2011, it had a population of 8,259, in 1,462 households.

== Demographics ==
As of 2011, Pachwan had a population of 8,259, in 1,462 households. This population was 52.1% male (4,307) and 47.9% female (3,952). The 0-6 age group numbered 1,307 (678 male and 629 female), making up 15.8% of the total population. 2,504 residents were members of Scheduled Castes, or 30.3% of the total.

The 1981 census recorded Pachwan as having a population of 3,283 people (1,806 male and 1,477 female), in 530 households and 524 physical houses.

The 1961 census recorded Pachwan as comprising 6 hamlets, with a total population of 2,500 people (1,371 male and 1,129 female), in 464 households and 355 physical houses. The area of the village was given as 2,019 acres and it had a post office and medical practitioner at that point.

== Infrastructure ==
As of 2011, Pachwan had 4 primary schools and 1 primary health sub centre and veterinary hospital. Drinking water was provided by hand pump; there were no public toilets. The village had a sub post office but no public library; there was at least some access to electricity for all purposes. Streets were made of both kachcha and pakka materials.
