= Nagla Dungar =

Village in Uttar Pradesh, India

Nagla Dungar नागला डूंगर
- Village
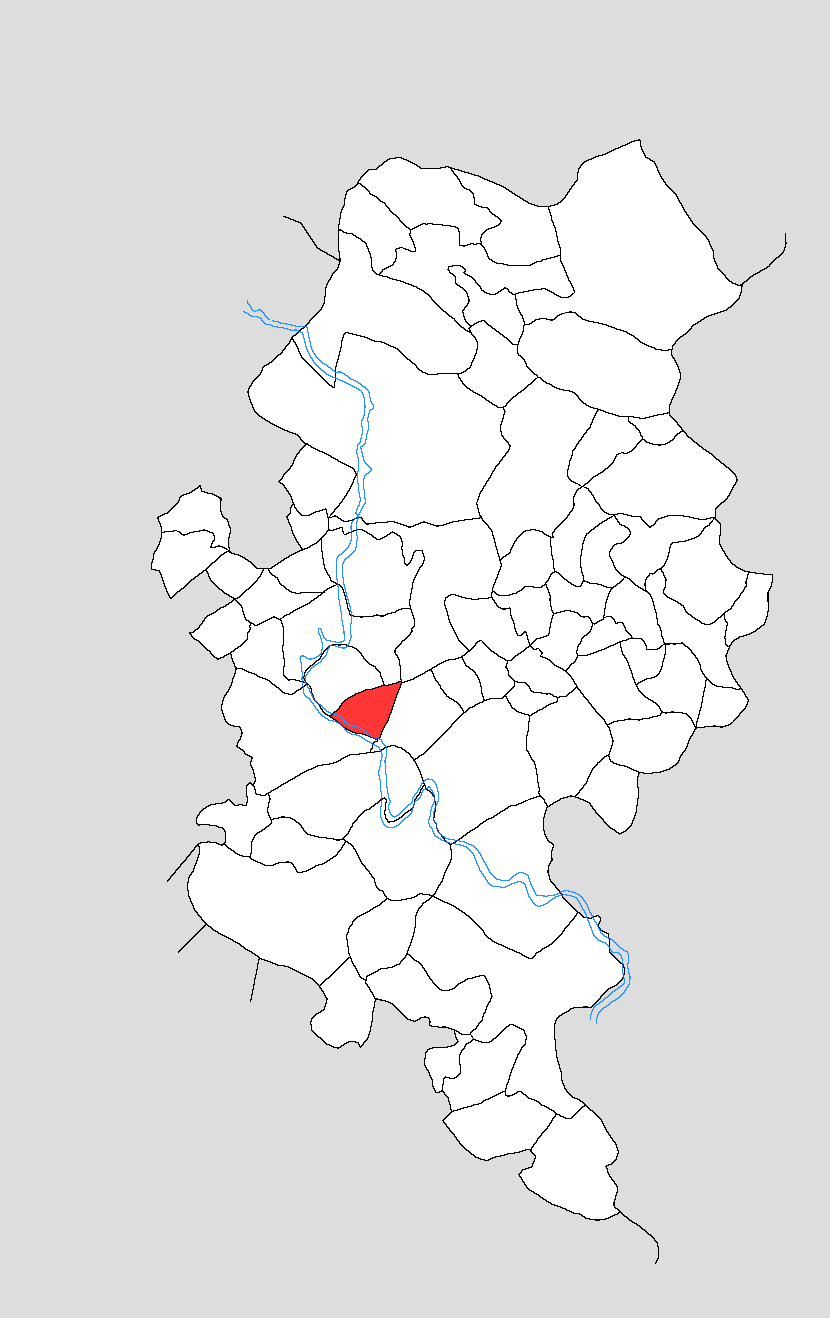
- Map showing Nagla Dungar in Kotla block

- Location in Uttar Pradesh, India
- Coordinates: 27.2582°N 78.38814°E
- Country: India
- State: Uttar Pradesh
- District: Firozabad
- Tehsil: Firozabad

Area
  - Total: 1.293 km^{2} (0.499 sq mi)

Population (2011)
  - Total: 1,129
  - Density: 873.2/km^{2} (2,261/sq mi)
- Time zone: UTC+5:30 (IST)

Nagla Dungar (Naglā Ḍūṁgar) is a village in Kotla block of Firozabad district, Uttar Pradesh, India. As of 2011, it had a population of 1,129, in 201 households.

== Demographics ==
As of 2011, Nagla Dungar had a population of 1,129, in 201 households. This population was 52.1% male (588) and 47.9% female (541). The 0-6 age group numbered 201 (107 male and 94 female), making up 17.8% of the total population. 120 residents were members of Scheduled Castes, or 10.6% of the total.

The 1981 census recorded Nagla Dungar (spelled "Nagla Dongar" in English but "Nagla Dungar" in Hindi) as having a population of 629 people (345 male and 284 female), in 108 households and 108 physical houses.

The 1961 census recorded Nagla Dungar (as "Nagla Doongar") as comprising 1 hamlet, with a total population of 422 people (226 male and 196 female), in 75 households and 68 physical houses. The area of the village was given as 320 acres.

== Infrastructure ==
As of 2011, Nagla Dungar had 1 primary school; it did not have any healthcare facilities. Drinking water was provided by hand pump and tube well/borehole; there were no public toilets. The village did not have a post office or public library; there was at least some access to electricity for all purposes. Streets were made of both kachcha and pakka materials.
