= Jakhai =

Village in Uttar Pradesh, India

- Village
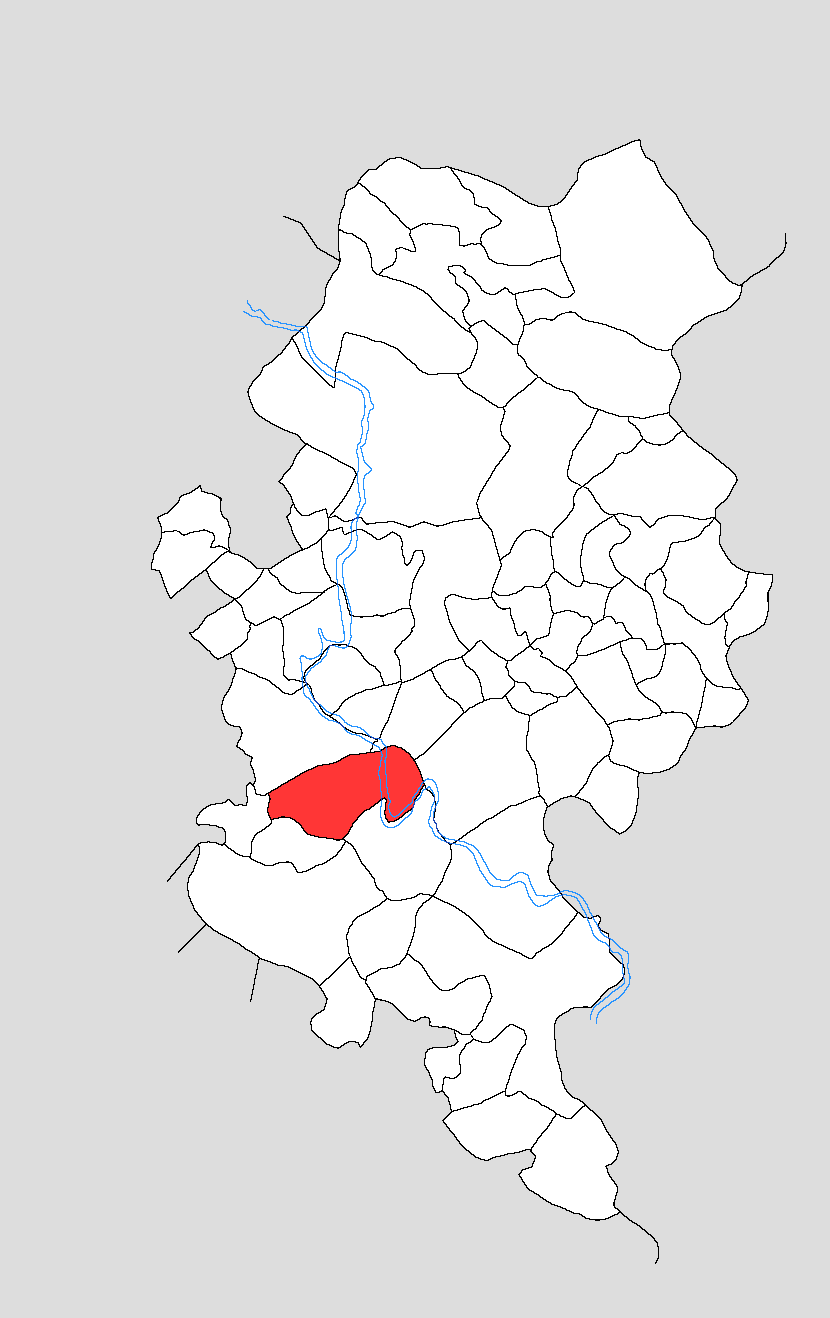
- Map showing Jakhai in Kotla block

- Location in Uttar Pradesh, India
- Coordinates: 27.23983°N 78.38716°E
- Country: India
- State: Uttar Pradesh
- District: Firozabad
- Tehsil: Firozabad

Area
  - Total: 7.99 km^{2} (3.08 sq mi)

Population (2011)
  - Total: 7,719
  - Density: 966/km^{2} (2,500/sq mi)
- Time zone: UTC+5:30 (IST)
- PIN: 283203

Jakhai (Jākhaī) is a village in Kotla block of Firozabad district, Uttar Pradesh, India. As of 2011, it had a population of 7,719, in 1,213 households.

== Demographics ==
As of 2011, Jakhai had a population of 7,719, in 1,213 households. This population was 54.4% male (4,201) and 45.6% female (3,518). The 0-6 age group numbered 1,270 (696 male and 574 female), making up 16.5% of the total population. 2,456 residents were members of Scheduled Castes, or 31.8% of the total.

The 1981 census recorded Jakhai as having a population of 4,340 people (2,376 male and 1,964 female), in 697 households and 697 physical houses.

The 1961 census recorded Jakhai as comprising 6 hamlets, with a total population of 2,807 people (1,522 male and 1,285 female), in 503 households and 402 physical houses. The area of the village was given as 2,051 acres and it had a post office and medical practitioner at that point.

== Infrastructure ==
As of 2011, Jakhai had 2 primary schools; it did not have any healthcare facilities. Drinking water was provided by tap, hand pump, and tube well/borehole; there were no public toilets. The village had a sub post office but no public library; there was at least some access to electricity for residential and agricultural (but not commercial) purposes. Streets were made of both kachcha and pakka materials.
