= Kotla, Firozabad =

Village in Uttar Pradesh, India

Kotla
- Village
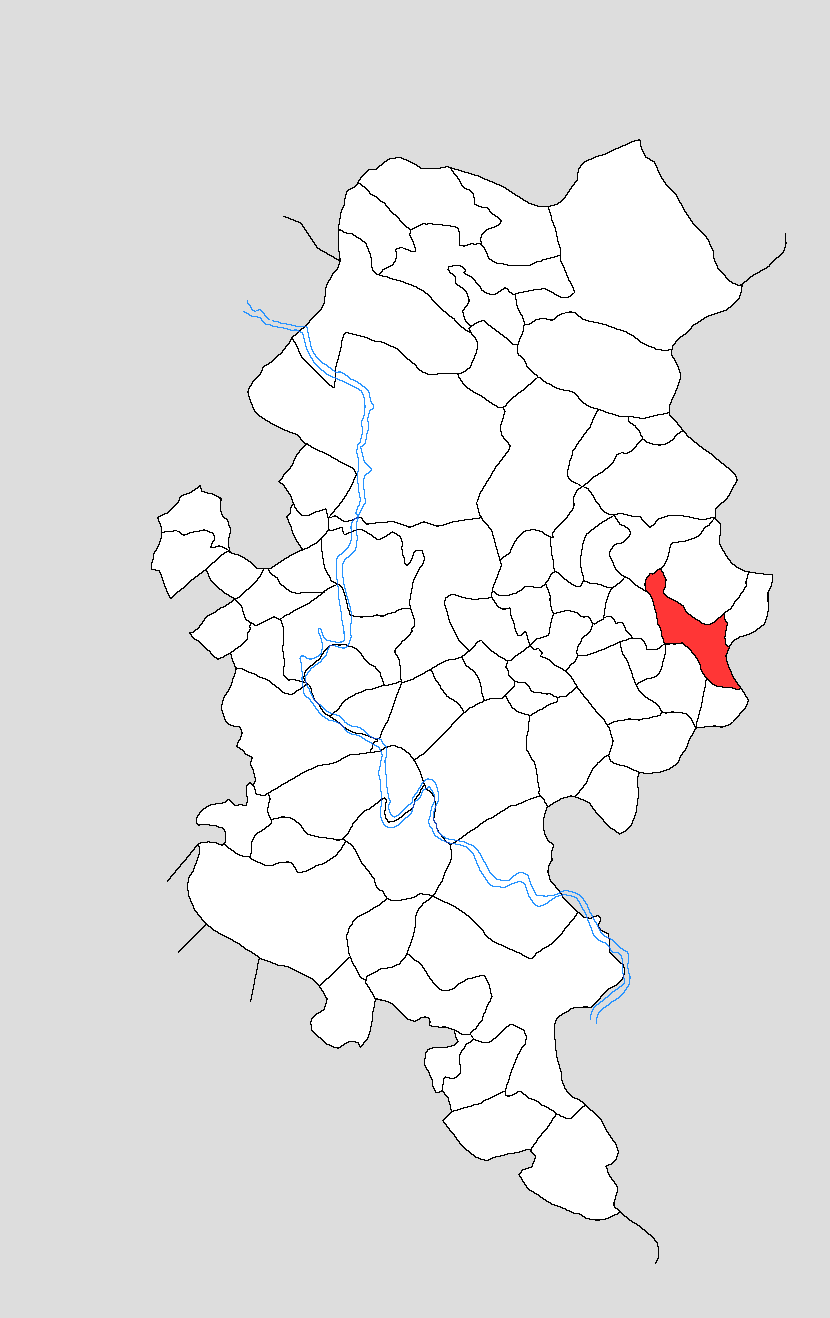
- Map showing Kotla in Kotla block

- Location in Uttar Pradesh, India
- Coordinates: 27.2739°N 78.46152°E
- Country: India
- State: Uttar Pradesh
- District: Firozabad
- Tehsil: Firozabad

Area
  - Total: 1.705 km^{2} (0.658 sq mi)

Population (2011)
  - Total: 3,331
  - Density: 1,954/km^{2} (5,060/sq mi)
- Time zone: UTC+5:30 (IST)
- PIN: 283203

Kotla (Koṭlā) is a village and community development block in Firozabad tehsil of Firozabad district, Uttar Pradesh. Located by a small stream called the Sengar, it was historically the seat of a prominent zamindari estate. As of 2011, Kotla had a population of 3,331, in 604 households.

== Geography ==
Kotla is located at a junction of roads between Firozabad, Tundla, and Awagarh. It is located near a small stream called the Sengar, which flows roughly parallel with the Sirsa river from west to east. Although the Sengar is very small, it sometimes floods the surrounding low-lying plains during the monsoon season. Before Firozabad district was created, Kotla was right on the eastern border of Agra district, with Mainpuri district just to the east.

== History ==
Kotla was historically the seat of a zamindari estate held by a family of Jadon Rajputs, which was founded sometime in the mid-1700s by one Ishwari Singh. The Jadons of Kotla were later subjugated by Mahadaji Shinde of Gwalior in the mid-1780s. By the turn of the 20th century, the Jadons of Kotla held 55 villages (Ishwari Singh had originally held 42), and their residence in Kotla was described as "a fine house standing on a considerable elevation above the village and approached by a steep and narrow lane. It is surrounded by a wall about 40 feet in height and a broad ditch." Besides this, Kotla was described as a market village with an upper primary school and a post office. It held markets twice per week, and was also the site of small fairs for Dussehra, Muharram, and Phul dol. As of 1901, Kotla's population was 1,914 (including 1,481 Hindus and 283 Muslims; the rest were mostly Jains).

== Demographics ==
As of 2011, Kotla had a population of 3,331, in 604 households. This population was 54.2% male (1,804) and 45.8% female (1,527). The 0-6 age group numbered 481 (266 male and 215 female), making up 14.4% of the total population. 887 residents were members of Scheduled Castes, or 26.6% of the total.

The 1981 census recorded Kotla as having a population of 1,897 people (1,003 male and 894 female), in 230 households and 223 physical houses.

The 1961 census recorded Kotla as comprising 1 hamlet, with a total population of 1,372 people (767 male and 605 female), in 302 households and 228 physical houses. The area of the village was given as 420 acres and it had a post office, hospital, and medical practitioner at that point.

== Infrastructure ==
As of 2011, Kotla had 2 primary schools and 1 primary health sub centre. Drinking water was provided by tap, hand pump, and tube well/borehole; there were no public toilets. The village had a sub post office but no public library; there was at least some access to electricity for all purposes. Streets were made of both kachcha and pakka materials.

== List of villages ==
The following 69 villages are counted as part of Kotla CD block:

1. Akilabad Hanspur
2. Alampur Kotla
3. Arajirudh
4. Asal Pur
5. Asan
6. Atipur
7. Badan Pur
8. Bahoran Pur
9. Bara Gaon
10. Bartara
11. Bazidpur Okhara
12. Bedipur Bidirika
13. Bhagipur Kotla
14. Bhaitari
15. Bhikanpur Meghpur
16. Dattpur
17. Daulatpur
18. Dauri
19. Dorsa Mohammadpur
20. Fatehapur Kotla
21. Gangni
22. Garhi Baran
23. Garhi Hansram
24. Garhi Janu
25. Garhi Kalyan
26. Garhi Shriram
27. Garhitodia
28. Gonch
29. Gondai
30. Hardaspur Kotla
31. Jaganpur
32. Jaitpur
33. Jakhai
34. Jampur
35. Jasrathpur
36. Jatau
37. Kachhpura
38. Kaitha
39. Kheri Kalan
40. Kheria Khurd
41. Kotla
42. Kotla (Narkhi) Talukra
43. Kotla (Narkhi) Dhonkal
44. Kutukpur Chunaurar
45. Ladpura
46. Latifpur Kotla
47. Lukharia
48. Madanpur
49. Maha Singhpur
50. Mahipura
51. Muiniddinpur
52. Nagla Dungar
53. Nagla Radhe
54. Nagla Semriya
55. Nayabash
56. Nepai
57. Okhra
58. Pachwan
59. Raipura
60. Rajaram Pur
61. Rajpur Kotla
62. Ratauli
63. Selempur Kotla
64. Sheola Rampur
65. Sherpur Bhura
66. Sikandarpur Kotla
67. Sunawai
68. Trilokpur
69. Wazirpur Kotla
