= Kheria Jarkhi =

Village in Uttar Pradesh, India

- Village
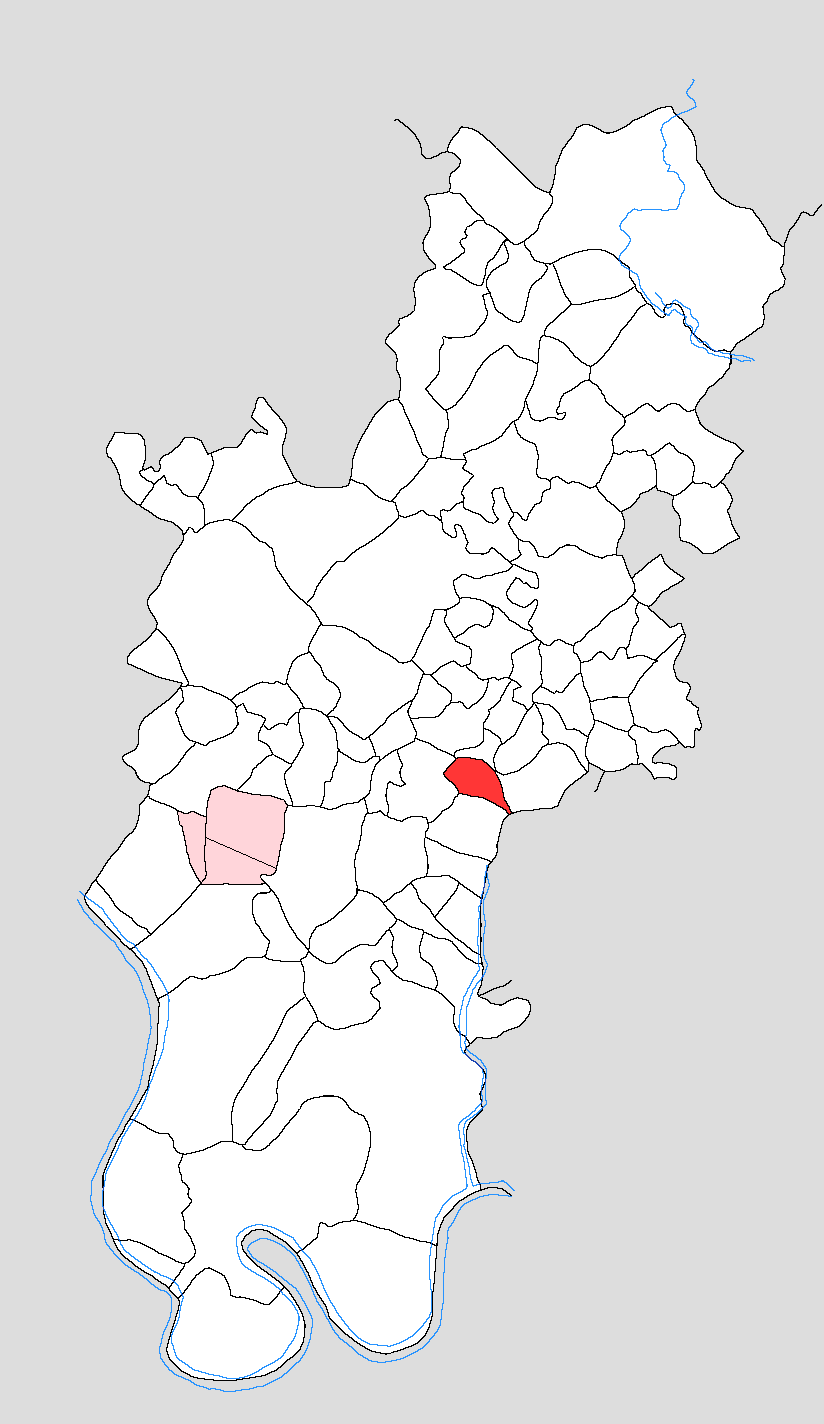
- Map showing Kheria Jarkhi in Tundla block

- Location in Uttar Pradesh, India
- Coordinates: 27.22444°N 78.30221°E
- Country: India
- State: Uttar Pradesh
- District: Firozabad
- Tehsil: Tundla

Area
  - Total: 1.425 km^{2} (0.550 sq mi)

Population (2011)
  - Total: 747
  - Density: 524/km^{2} (1,360/sq mi)
- Time zone: UTC+5:30 (IST)

Kheria Jarkhi (Kheriyā Jārkhī) is a village in Tundla block of Firozabad district, Uttar Pradesh. As of 2011, it has a population of 747, in 109 households.

== Demographics ==
As of 2011, Kheria Jarkhi had a population of 747, in 109 households. This population was 56.0% male (418) and 44.0% female (329). The 0-6 age group numbered 133 (72 male and 61 female), making up 17.8% of the total population. 248 residents were members of Scheduled Castes, or 33.2% of the total.

The 1981 census recorded Kheria Jarkhi as having a population of 467 people (252 male and 215 female), in 81 households and 81 physical houses.

The 1961 census recorded Kheria Jarkhi as comprising 1 hamlet, with a total population of 306 people (171 male and 135 female), in 54 households and 40 physical houses. The area of the village was given as 352 acres.

== Infrastructure ==
As of 2011, Kheria Jarkhi had 1 primary school; it did not have any healthcare facilities. Drinking water was provided by hand pump and tube well/borehole; there were no public toilets. The village did not have a post office or public library; there was at least some access to electricity for all purposes. Streets were made of both kachcha and pakka materials.
