= Nagla Punu, Firozabad =

Village in Uttar Pradesh, India

Nagla Punu
- Village
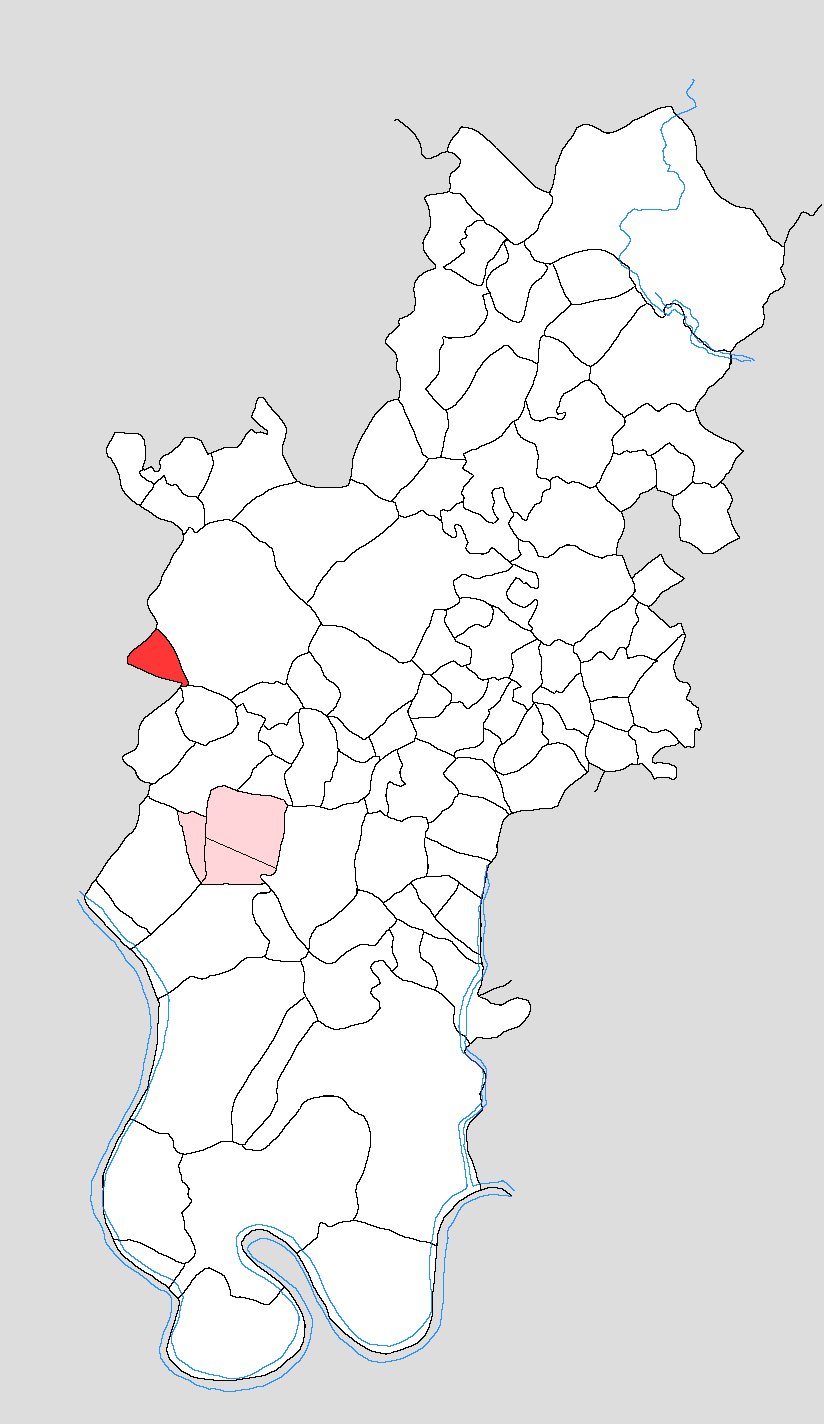
- Map showing Nagla Punu in Tundla block

- Location in Uttar Pradesh, India
- Coordinates: 27.25455°N 78.21477°E
- Country: India
- State: Uttar Pradesh
- District: Firozabad
- Tehsil: Tundla

Area
  - Total: 1.515 km^{2} (0.585 sq mi)

Population (2011)
  - Total: 1,721
  - Density: 1,136/km^{2} (2,942/sq mi)
- Time zone: UTC+5:30 (IST)

Nagla Punu (Naglā Punū) is a village in Tundla block of Firozabad district, Uttar Pradesh, India. As of 2011, it had a population of 1,721, in 262 households.

== Demographics ==
As of 2011, Nagla Punu had a population of 1,721, in 262 households. This population was 51.9% male (893) and 48.1% female (828). The 0-6 age group numbered 214 (101 male and 114 female), making up 12.4% of the total population. 474 residents were members of Scheduled Castes, or 27.5% of the total.

The 1981 census recorded Nagla Punu (as "Nagla Punuu") as having a population of 944 people (543 male and 401 female), in 146 households and 144 physical houses.

The 1961 census recorded Nagla Punu as comprising 2 hamlets, with a total population of 586 people (301 male and 285 female), in 99 households and 82 physical houses. The area of the village was given as 374 acres.

== Infrastructure ==
As of 2011, Nagla Punu had 1 primary school; it did not have any healthcare facilities. Drinking water was provided by hand pump; there were no public toilets. The village did not have a post office or public library; there was at least some access to electricity for all purposes. Streets were made of both kachcha and pakka materials.
