= Himmatpur, Tundla =

Village in Uttar Pradesh, India

Himmatpur
- Village
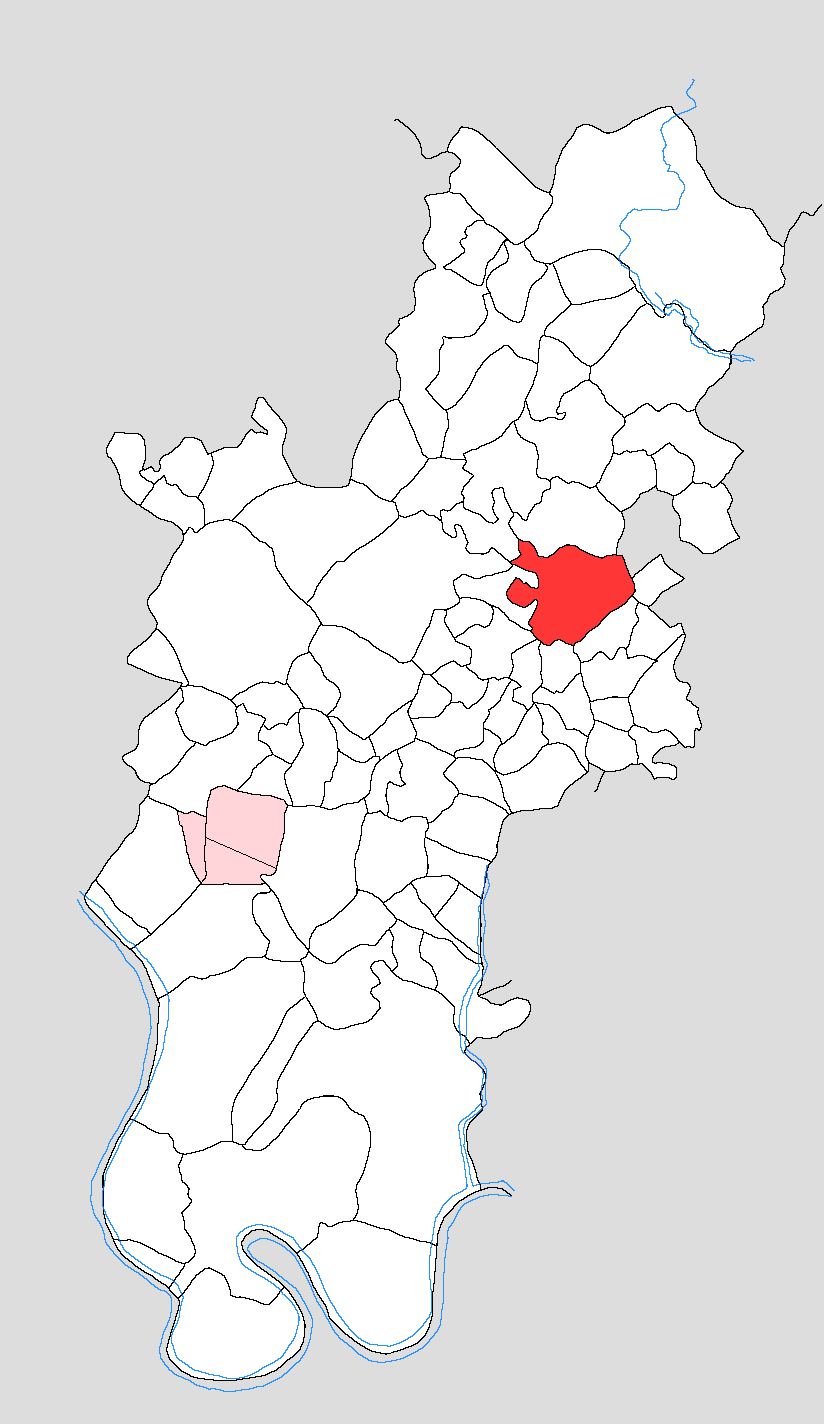
- Map showing Himmatpur in Tundla block

- Location in Uttar Pradesh, India
- Coordinates: 27.27936°N 78.32784°E
- Country: India
- State: Uttar Pradesh
- District: Firozabad
- Tehsil: Tundla

Area
  - Total: 6.705 km^{2} (2.589 sq mi)

Population (2011)
  - Total: 7,230
  - Density: 1,080/km^{2} (2,790/sq mi)
- Time zone: UTC+5:30 (IST)
- PIN: 283204

Himmatpur (Himmatpur) is a village in Tundla block of Firozabad district, Uttar Pradesh. As of 2011, it has a population of 7,230, in 1,094 households.

== Geography ==
Near Himmatpur there is a marshy area draining to the Sirsa river.

== History ==
During the Indian Rebellion of 1857, the zamindar of Himmatpur, Zorawar Singh, took part in the rebellion; he attacked the tehsil headquarters of Itimadpur and captured it on 5 July of that year.

== Demographics ==
As of 2011, Himmatpur had a population of 7,230, in 1,094 households. This population was 53.9% male (3,894) and 46.1% female (3,336). The 0-6 age group numbered 1,216 (642 male and 574 female), making up 16.8% of the total population. 1,521 residents were members of Scheduled Castes, or 21.0% of the total.

The 1981 census recorded Himmatpur as having a population of 4,596 people (2,541 male and 2,055 female), in 733 households and 706 physical houses.

The 1961 census recorded Himmatpur as comprising 5 hamlets, with a total population of 2,774 people (1,519 male and 1,255 female), in 515 households and 456 physical houses. The area of the village was given as 1,625 acres and it had a post office and medical practitioner at that point.

== Infrastructure ==
As of 2011, Himmatpur had 6 primary schools; it did not have any healthcare facilities. Drinking water was provided by tap and hand pump; there were no public toilets. The village had a sub post office but no public library; there was at least some access to electricity for residential and agricultural (but not commercial) purposes. Streets were made of both kachcha and pakka materials.
