= Bhikanpur Bajhera =

Village in Uttar Pradesh, India

- Village
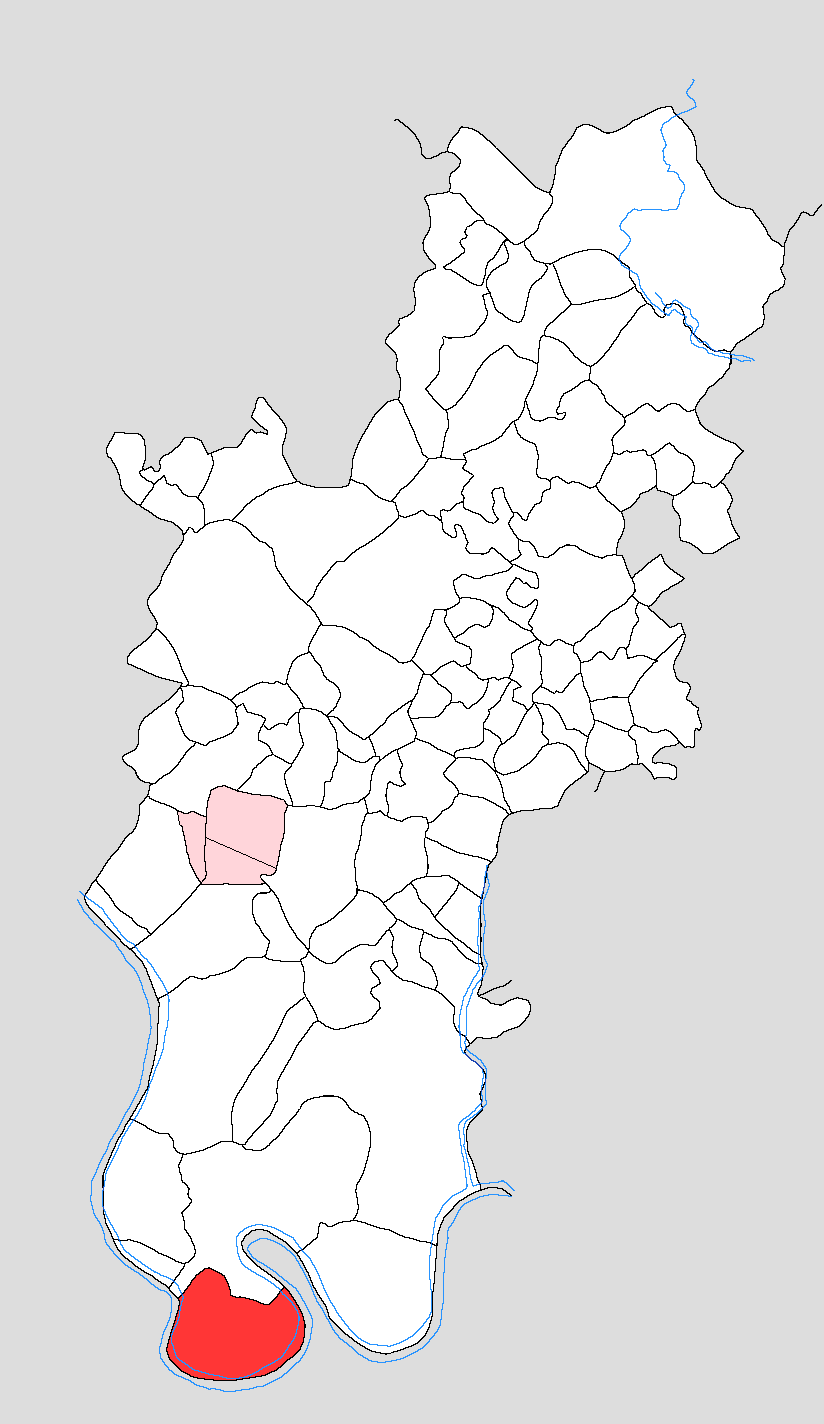
- Map showing Bhikanpur Bajhera in Tundla block

- Location in Uttar Pradesh, India
- Coordinates: 27.087554°N 78.2336088°E
- Country: India
- State: Uttar Pradesh
- District: Firozabad
- Tehsil: Tundla

Area
  - Total: 7.233 km^{2} (2.793 sq mi)

Population (2011)
  - Total: 1,963
  - Density: 271.4/km^{2} (702.9/sq mi)
- Time zone: UTC+5:30 (IST)

Bhikanpur Bajhera (Bhīkanpur Bajherā) is a village in Tundla block of Firozabad district, Uttar Pradesh, India. As of 2011, it had a population of 1,963, in 289 households.

== Demographics ==
As of 2011, Bhikanpur Bajhera had a population of 1,963, in 289 households. This population was 53.9% male (1,059) and 46.1% female (904). The 0-6 age group numbered 413 (209 male and 204 female), making up 21.0% of the total population. 23 residents were members of Scheduled Castes, or 1.2% of the total.

The 1981 census recorded Bhikanpur Bajhera as having a population of 1,006 people (559 male and 447 female), in 151 households and 148 physical houses.

The 1961 census recorded Bhikanpur Bajhera as comprising 8 hamlets, with a total population of 810 people (450 male and 360 female), in 134 households and 116 physical houses. The area of the village was given as 1,798 acres.

== Infrastructure ==
As of 2011, Bhikanpur Bajhera had 1 primary school; it did not have any healthcare facilities. Drinking water was provided by well, hand pump, and tube well/borehole; there were no public toilets. The village did not have a post office or public library; there was at least some access to electricity for all purposes. Streets were made of pakka materials.
