= Dharampur, Tundla =

Village in Uttar Pradesh, India

Dharampur
- Village
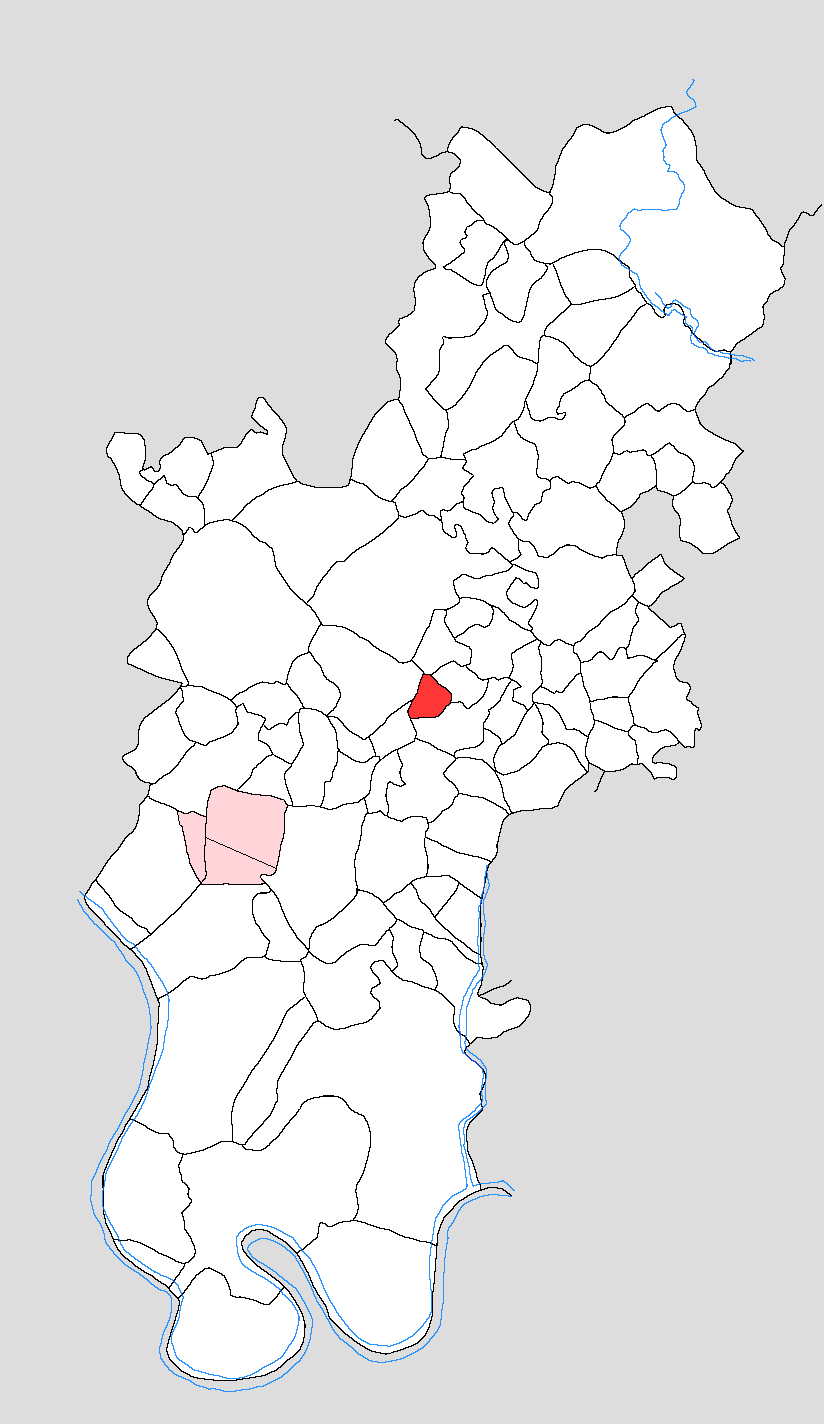
- Map showing Dharampur in Tundla block

- Location in Uttar Pradesh, India
- Coordinates: 27.247°N 78.2909°E
- Country: India
- State: Uttar Pradesh
- District: Firozabad
- Tehsil: Tundla

Area
  - Total: 1.069 km^{2} (0.413 sq mi)

Population (2011)
  - Total: 1,162
  - Density: 1,087/km^{2} (2,815/sq mi)
- Time zone: UTC+5:30 (IST)

Dharampur (Dharampur) is a village in Tundla block of Firozabad district, Uttar Pradesh, India. As of 2011, it had a population of 1,162, in 207 households.

== Demographics ==
As of 2011, Dharampur had a population of 1,162, in 207 households. This population was 54.9% male (638) and 45.1% female (524). The 0-6 age group numbered 143 (71 male and 72 female), making up 12.3% of the total population. 196 residents were members of Scheduled Castes, or 16.9% of the total.

The 1981 census recorded Dharampur (as "Dhrampur") as having a population of 664 people (377 male and 287 female), in 86 households and 84 physical houses.

The 1961 census recorded Dharampur as comprising 1 hamlet, with a total population of 412 people (228 male and 184 female), in 70 households and 55 physical houses. The area of the village was given as 267 acres.

== Infrastructure ==
As of 2011, Dharampur had 1 primary school; it did not have any healthcare facilities. Drinking water was provided by hand pump and tube well/borehole; there were no public toilets. The village did not have a post office or public library; there was at least some access to electricity for all purposes. Streets were made of both kachcha and pakka materials.
