= Chhitrai =

Village in Uttar Pradesh, India

- Village
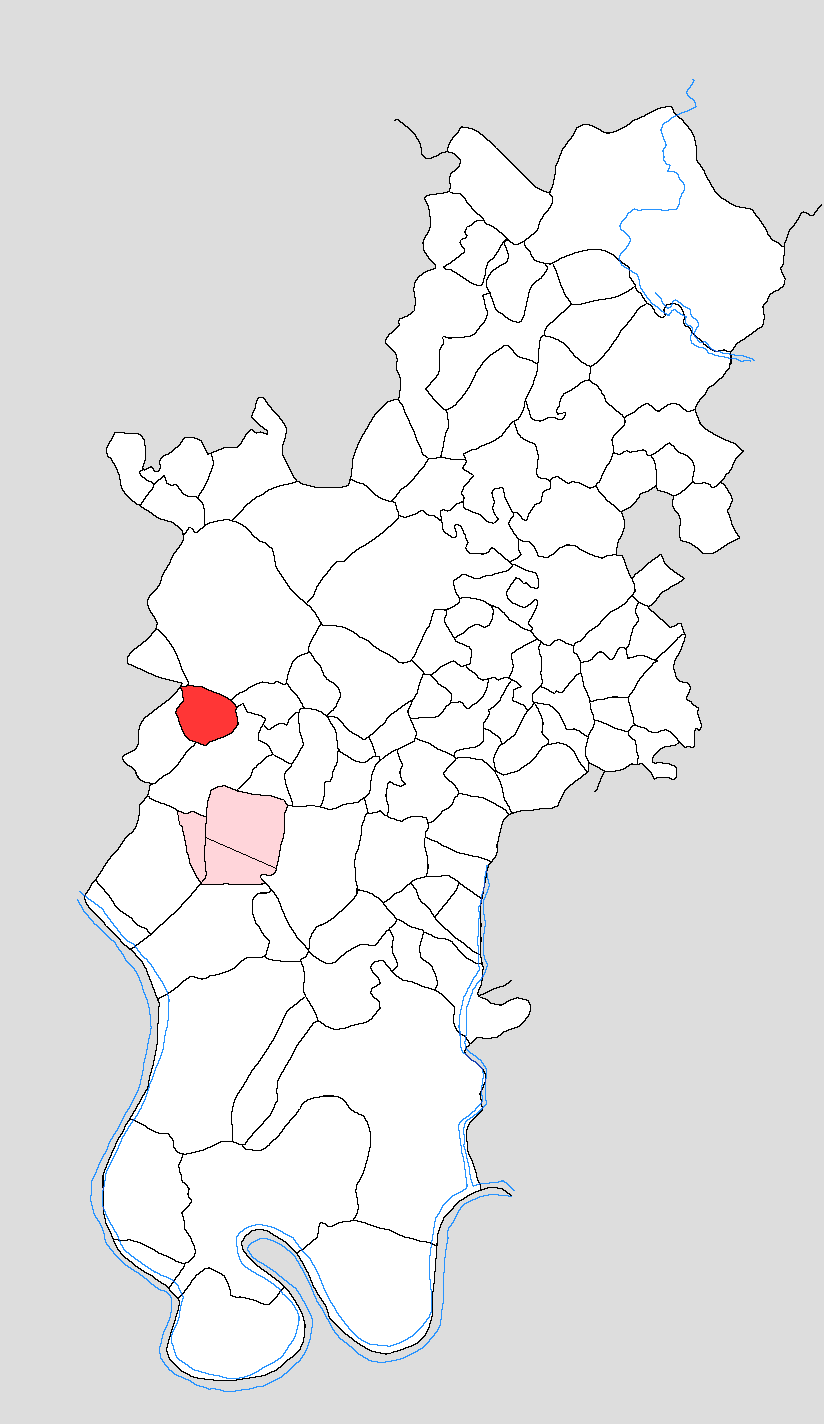
- Map showing Chhitrai in Tundla block

- Location in Uttar Pradesh, India
- Coordinates: 27°14′32″N 78°13′39″E
- Country: India
- State: Uttar Pradesh
- District: Firozabad
- Tehsil: Tundla

Area
  - Total: 2.07 km^{2} (0.80 sq mi)

Population (2011)
  - Total: 2,360
  - Density: 1,140/km^{2} (2,950/sq mi)
- Time zone: UTC+5:30 (IST)

Chhitrai (Chhitraī) is a village in Tundla block of Firozabad district, Uttar Pradesh. As of 2011, it has a population of 2,360, in 383 households.

== Demographics ==
As of 2011, Chhitrai had a population of 2,360, in 383 households. This population was 55.4% male (1,308) and 44.6% female (1,052). The 0-6 age group numbered 363 (203 male and 160 female), making up 15.4% of the total population. 907 residents were members of Scheduled Castes, or 38.4% of the total.

The 1981 census recorded Chhitrai as having a population of 1,354 people (738 male and 616 female), in 226 households and 226 physical houses.

The 1961 census recorded Chhitrai as comprising 1 hamlet, with a total population of 842 people (448 male and 394 female), in 167 households and 145 physical houses. The area of the village was given as 517 acres.

== Infrastructure ==
As of 2011, Chhitrai had 1 primary school; it did not have any healthcare facilities. Drinking water was provided by hand pump and tube well/borehole; there were no public toilets. The village did not have a post office or public library; there was at least some access to electricity for all purposes. Streets were made of both kachcha and pakka materials.
