= Mohammadabad, Firozabad =

Village in Uttar Pradesh, India

Mohammadabad
- Village
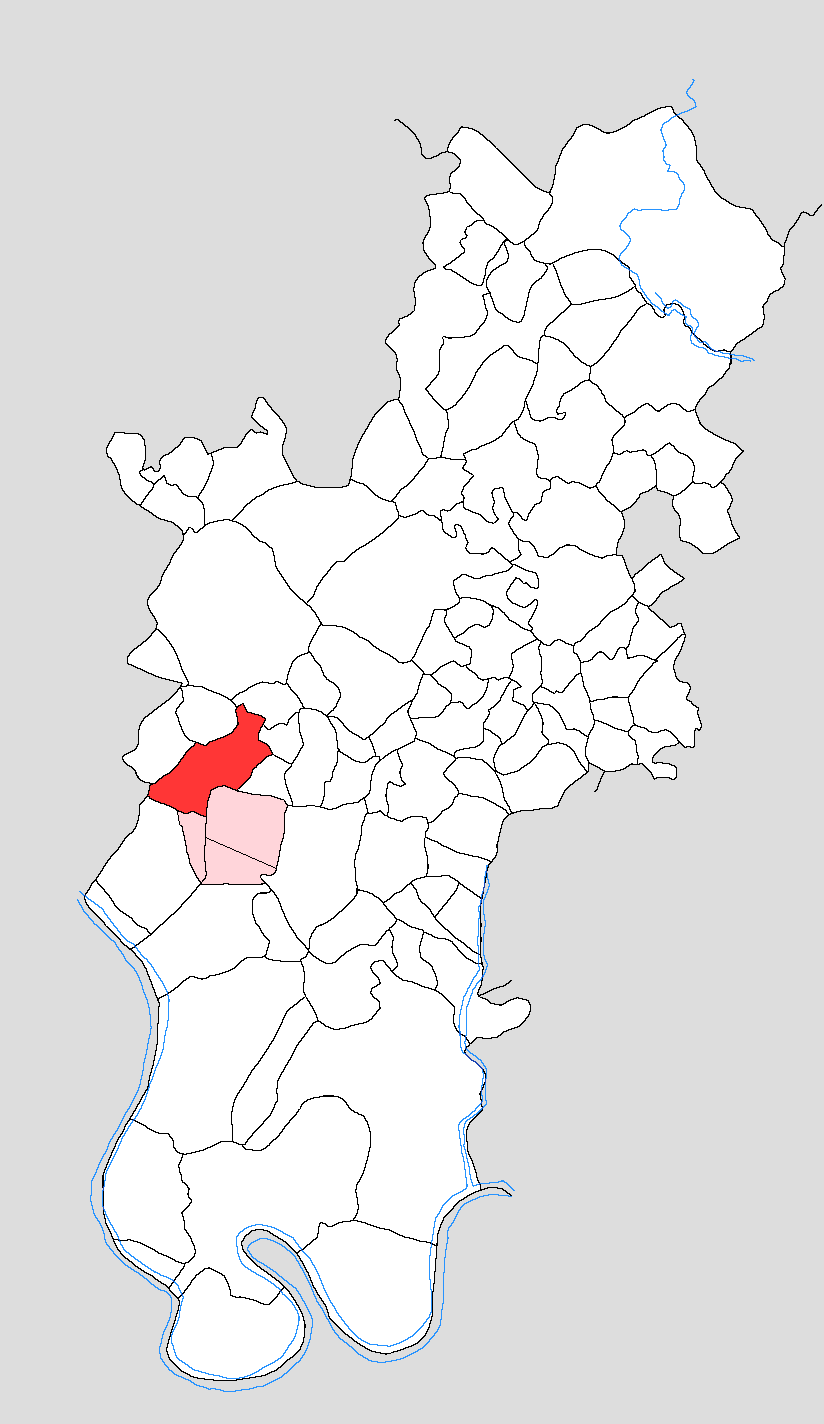
- Map showing Mohammadabad in Tundla block

- Location in Uttar Pradesh, India
- Coordinates: 27.22927°N 78.23154°E
- Country: India
- State: Uttar Pradesh
- District: Firozabad
- Tehsil: Tundla

Area
  - Total: 4.908 km^{2} (1.895 sq mi)

Population (2011)
  - Total: 8,907
  - Density: 1,815/km^{2} (4,700/sq mi)
- Time zone: UTC+5:30 (IST)

Mohammadabad (Mohammadābād) is a village in Tundla block of Firozabad district, Uttar Pradesh. As of 2011, it has a population of 8,907, in 1,395 households.

== Demographics ==
As of 2011, Mohammadabad had a population of 8,907, in 1,395 households. This population was 54.0% male (4,808) and 46.0% female (4,099). The 0-6 age group numbered 1,378 (710 male and 668 female), making up 15.5% of the total population. 1,517 residents were members of Scheduled Castes, or 17.0% of the total.

The 1981 census recorded Mohammadabad as having a population of 4,384 people (2,470 male and 1,914 female), in 761 households and 748 physical houses.

The 1961 census recorded Mohammadabad as comprising 3 hamlets, with a total population of 3,015 people (1,638 male and 1,377 female), in 553 households and 425 physical houses. The area of the village was given as 1,212 acres and it had a post office and medical practitioner at that point.

== Infrastructure ==
As of 2011, Mohammadabad had 6 primary schools; it did not have any healthcare facilities. Drinking water was provided by tap, hand pump, and tube well/borehole; there were no public toilets. The village had a sub post office but no public library; there was at least some access to electricity for all purposes. Streets were made of both kachcha and pakka materials.
