= Rasulabad, Firozabad =

Village in Uttar Pradesh, India

Rasulabad
- Village
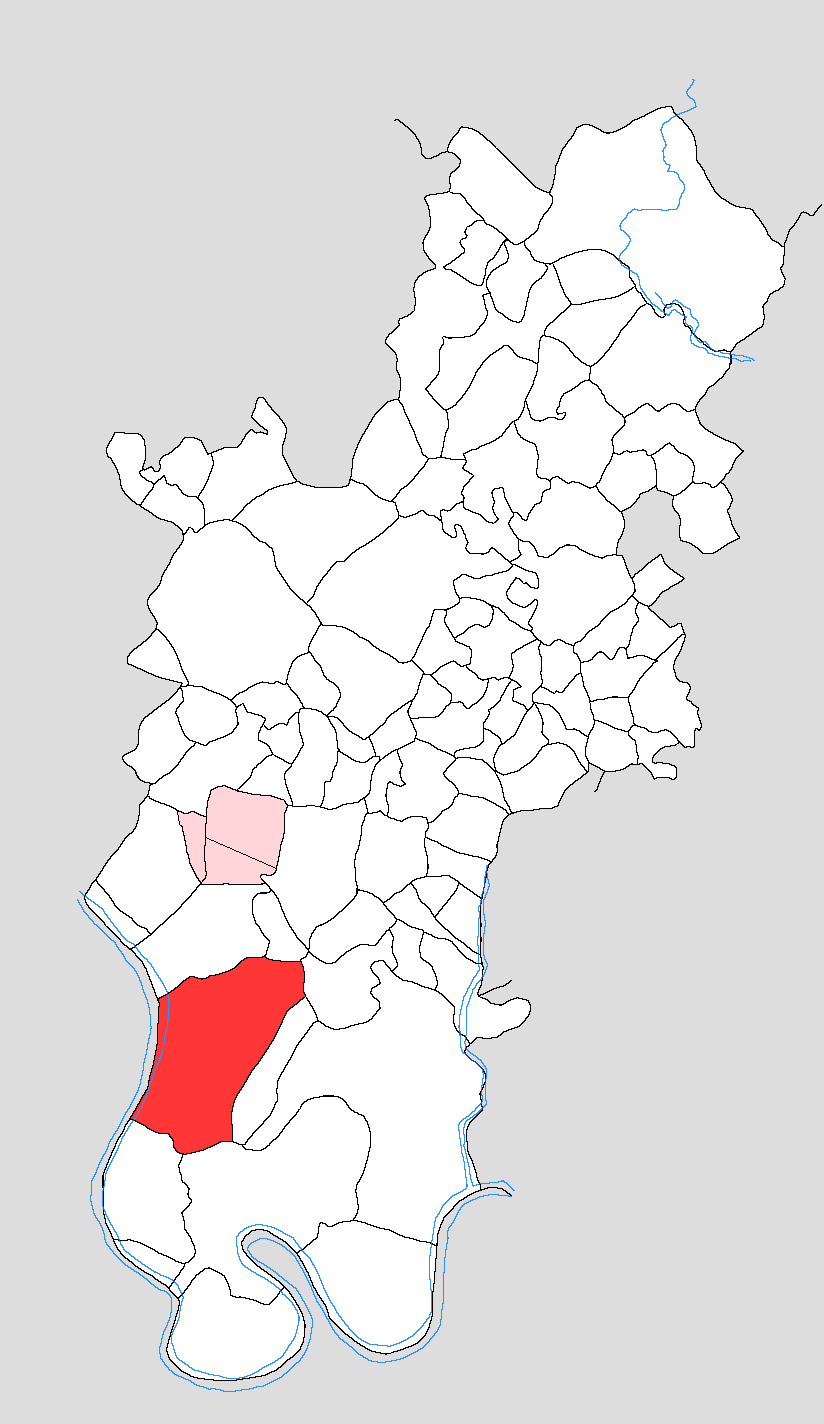
- Map showing Rasulabad in Tundla block

- Location in Uttar Pradesh, India
- Coordinates: 27.161804°N 78.2301438°E
- Country: India
- State: Uttar Pradesh
- District: Firozabad
- Tehsil: Tundla

Area
  - Total: 13.662 km^{2} (5.275 sq mi)

Population (2011)
  - Total: 9,958
  - Density: 728.9/km^{2} (1,888/sq mi)
- Time zone: UTC+5:30 (IST)
- PIN: 283204

Rasulabad (Rasūlābād) is a village in Tundla block of Firozabad district, Uttar Pradesh. As of 2011, it has a population of 9,958, in 1,537 households.

== Demographics ==
As of 2011, Rasulabad had a population of 9,958, in 1,537 households. This population was 53.2% male (5,298) and 46.8% female (4,660). The 0-6 age group numbered 1,900 (997 male and 903 female), making up 19.1% of the total population. 256 residents were members of Scheduled Castes, or 2.6% of the total.

The 1981 census recorded Rasulabad as having a population of 5,120 people (2,784 male and 2,336 female), in 784 households and 769 physical houses.

The 1961 census recorded Rasulabad as comprising 14 hamlets, with a total population of 3,288 people (1,721 male and 1,567 female), in 540 households and 404 physical houses. The area of the village was given as 3,325 acres and it had a post office at that point.

== Infrastructure ==
As of 2011, Rasulabad had 3 primary schools and 1 primary health centre. Drinking water was provided by tap, hand pump, and tube well/borehole; there were no public toilets. The village had a sub post office but no public library; there was at least some access to electricity for all purposes. Streets were made of both kachcha and pakka materials.
