= Nagla Suraj =

Village in Uttar Pradesh, India

- Village
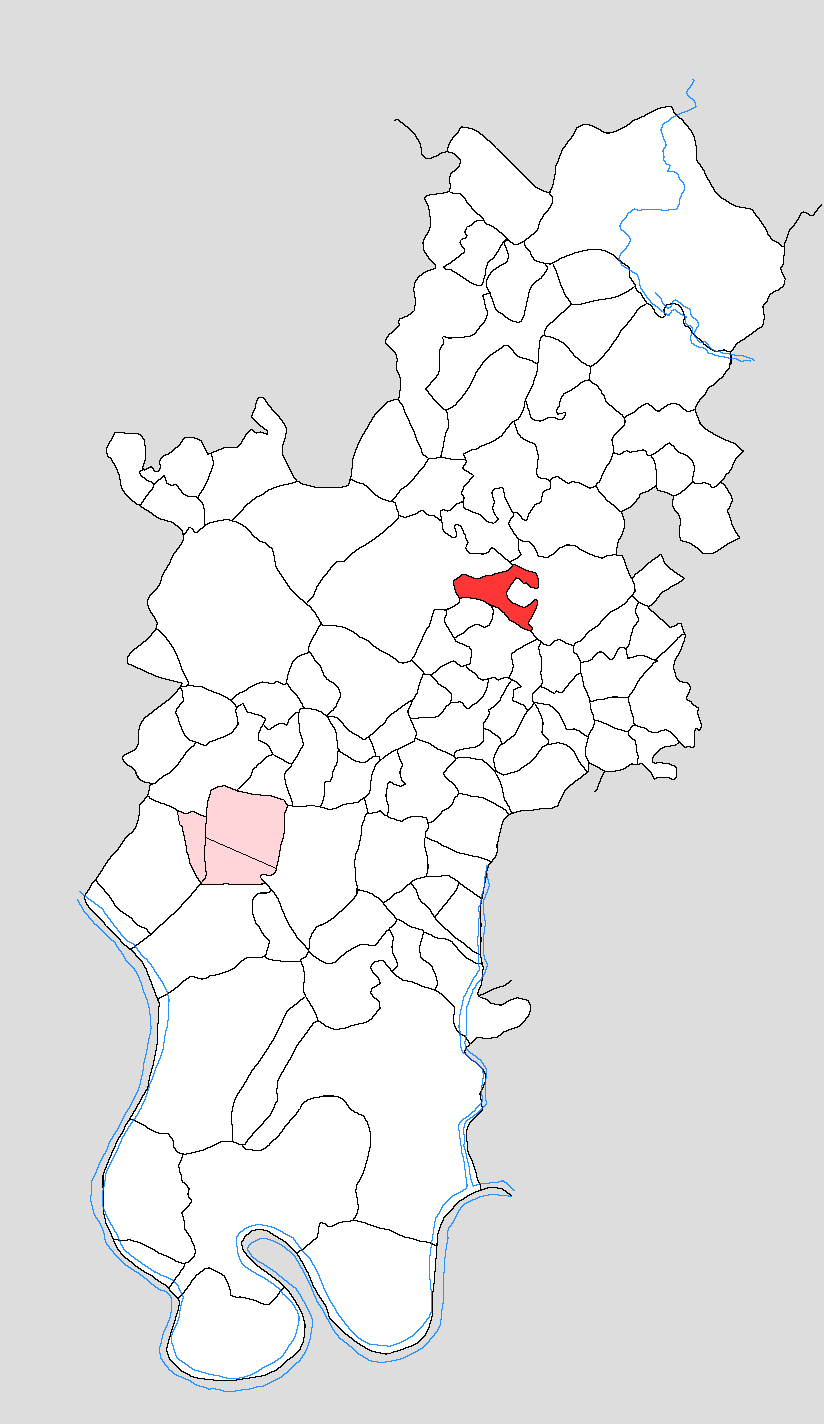
- Map showing Nagla Suraj in Tundla block

- Location in Uttar Pradesh, India
- Coordinates: 27.27845°N 78.31006°E
- Country: India
- State: Uttar Pradesh
- District: Firozabad
- Tehsil: Tundla

Area
  - Total: 1.921 km^{2} (0.742 sq mi)

Population (2011)
  - Total: 1,737
  - Density: 904.2/km^{2} (2,342/sq mi)
- Time zone: UTC+5:30 (IST)

Nagla Suraj (Naglā Sūraj) is a village in Tundla block of Firozabad district, Uttar Pradesh. As of 2011, it had a population of 1,737, in 280 households.

== Demographics ==
As of 2011, Nagla Suraj had a population of 1,737, in 280 households. This population was 55.0% male (956) and 45.0% female (781). The 0-6 age group numbered 242 (136 male and 106 female), making up 13.9% of the total population. 1,210 residents were members of Scheduled Castes, or 69.7% of the total.

The 1981 census recorded Nagla Suraj as having a population of 1,020 people (563 male and 457 female), in 172 households and 171 physical houses.

The 1961 census recorded Nagla Suraj as comprising 2 hamlets, with a total population of 700 people (386 male and 314 female), in 128 households and 85 physical houses. The area of the village was given as 520 acres.

== Infrastructure ==
As of 2011, Nagla Suraj had 1 primary school; it did not have any healthcare facilities. Drinking water was provided by hand pump; there were no public toilets. The village did not have a post office or public library; there was at least some access to electricity for all purposes. Streets were made of both kachcha and pakka materials.
