= Garhi Thakur =

Village in Uttar Pradesh, India

- Village
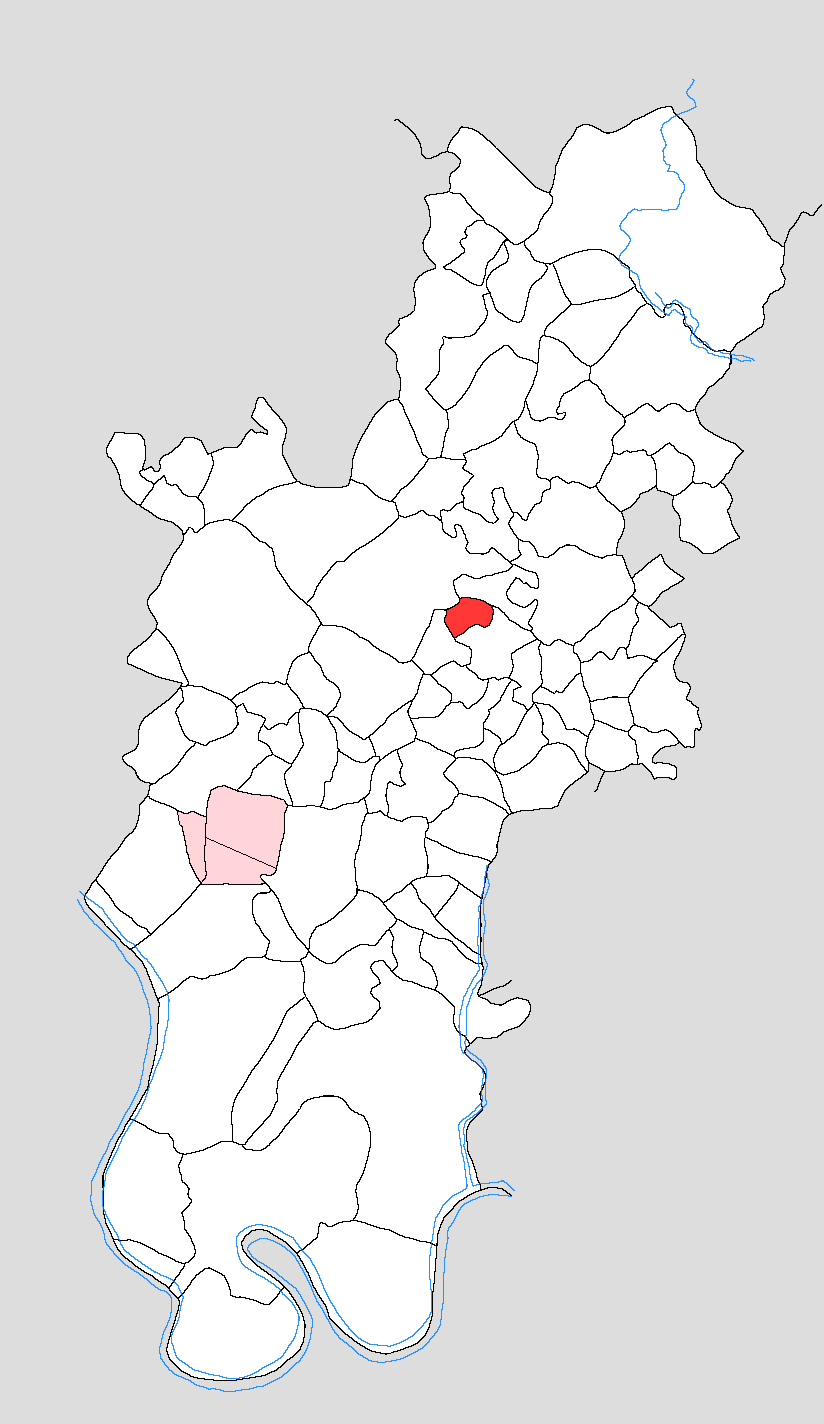
- Map showing Garhi Thakur in Tundla block

- Location in Uttar Pradesh, India
- Coordinates: 27.26655°N 78.29806°E
- Country: India
- State: Uttar Pradesh
- District: Firozabad
- Tehsil: Tundla

Area
  - Total: 0.951 km^{2} (0.367 sq mi)

Population (2011)
  - Total: 821
  - Density: 863/km^{2} (2,240/sq mi)
- Time zone: UTC+5:30 (IST)
- PIN: 283203

Garhi Thakur (Gaṛhī Ṭhākur) is a village in Tundla block of Firozabad district, Uttar Pradesh, India. As of 2011, it had a population of 821, in 119 households.

== Demographics ==
As of 2011, Garhi Thakur had a population of 821, in 119 households. This population was 54.4% male (447) and 45.6% female (374). The 0-6 age group numbered 122 (70 male and 52 female), making up 14.9% of the total population. 349 residents were members of Scheduled Castes, or 42.5% of the total.

The 1981 census recorded Garhi Thakur as having a population of 431 people (224 male and 207 female), in 268 households and 254 physical houses.

The 1961 census recorded Garhi Thakur as comprising 1 hamlet, with a total population of 245 people (128 male and 117 female), in 63 households and 63 physical houses. The area of the village was given as 235 acres.

== Infrastructure ==
As of 2011, Garhi Thakur had 1 primary school; it did not have any healthcare facilities. Drinking water was provided by hand pump and tube well/borehole; there were no public toilets. The village did not have a post office or public library; there was at least some access to electricity for all purposes. Streets were made of both kachcha and pakka materials.
