= Ghirauli =

Village in Uttar Pradesh, India

- Village
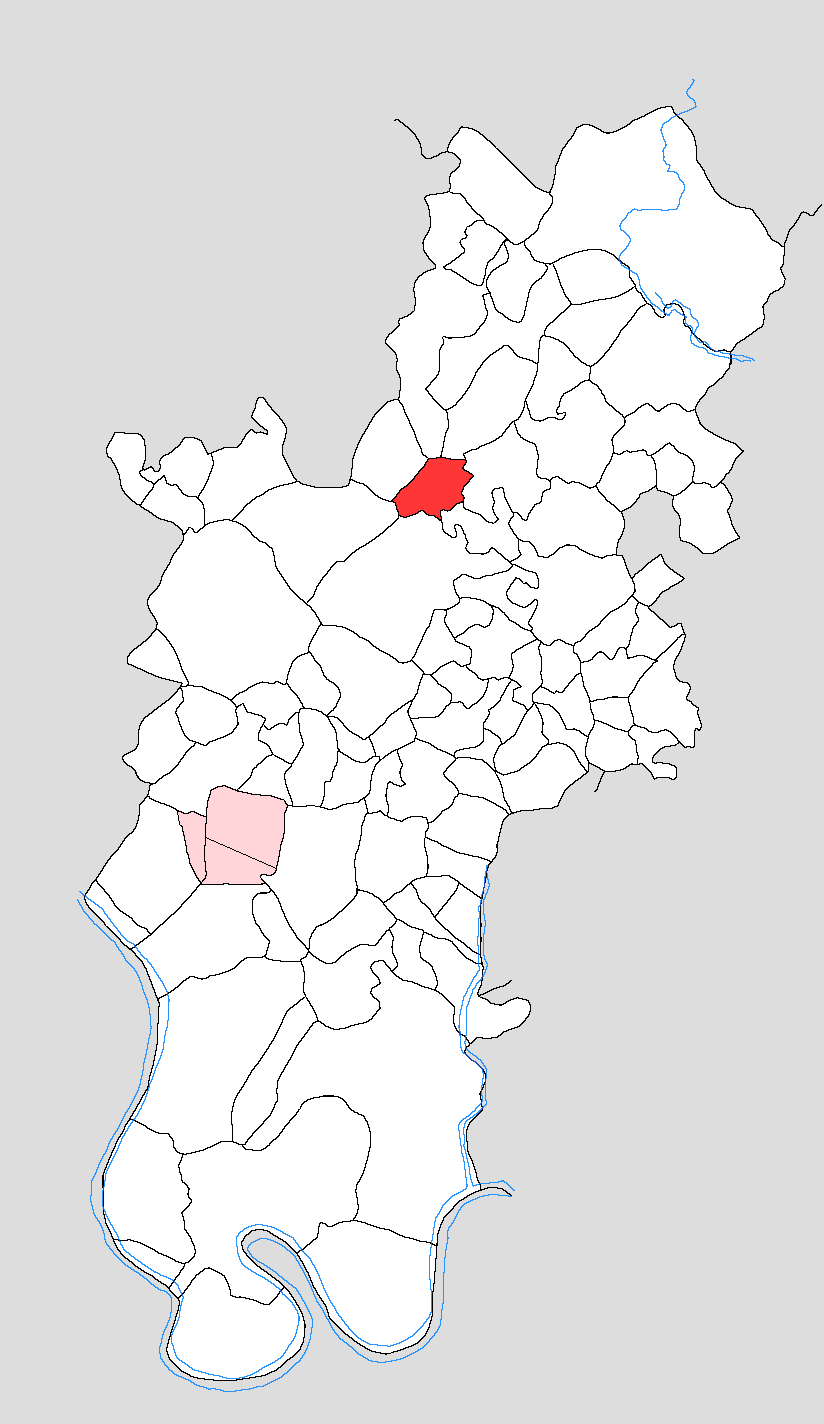
- Map showing Ghirauli in Tundla block

- Location in Uttar Pradesh, India
- Coordinates: 27.30178°N 78.29034°E
- Country: India
- State: Uttar Pradesh
- District: Firozabad
- Tehsil: Tundla

Area
  - Total: 2.581 km^{2} (0.997 sq mi)

Population (2011)
  - Total: 1,963
  - Density: 760.6/km^{2} (1,970/sq mi)
- Time zone: UTC+5:30 (IST)
- PIN: 283204

Ghirauli (Ghiraulī) is a village in Tundla block of Firozabad district, Uttar Pradesh, India. As of 2011, it had a population of 1,963, in 317 households.

== Demographics ==
As of 2011, Ghirauli had a population of 1,963, in 317 households. This population was 54.6% male (1,072) and 45.4% female (891). The 0-6 age group numbered 302 (177 male and 125 female), making up 15.4% of the total population. 361 residents were members of Scheduled Castes, or 18.4% of the total.

The 1981 census recorded Ghirauli as having a population of 1,185 people (656 male and 529 female), in 166 households and 162 physical houses.

The 1961 census recorded Ghirauli as comprising 3 hamlets, with a total population of 777 people (432 male and 345 female), in 82 households and 52 physical houses. The area of the village was given as 666 acres.

== Infrastructure ==
As of 2011, Ghirauli had 1 primary school; it did not have any healthcare facilities. Drinking water was provided by hand pump; there were no public toilets. The village did not have a post office or public library; there was at least some access to electricity for all purposes. Streets were made of both kachcha and pakka materials.
