= Nagla Kalua =

Village in Uttar Pradesh, India

- Village
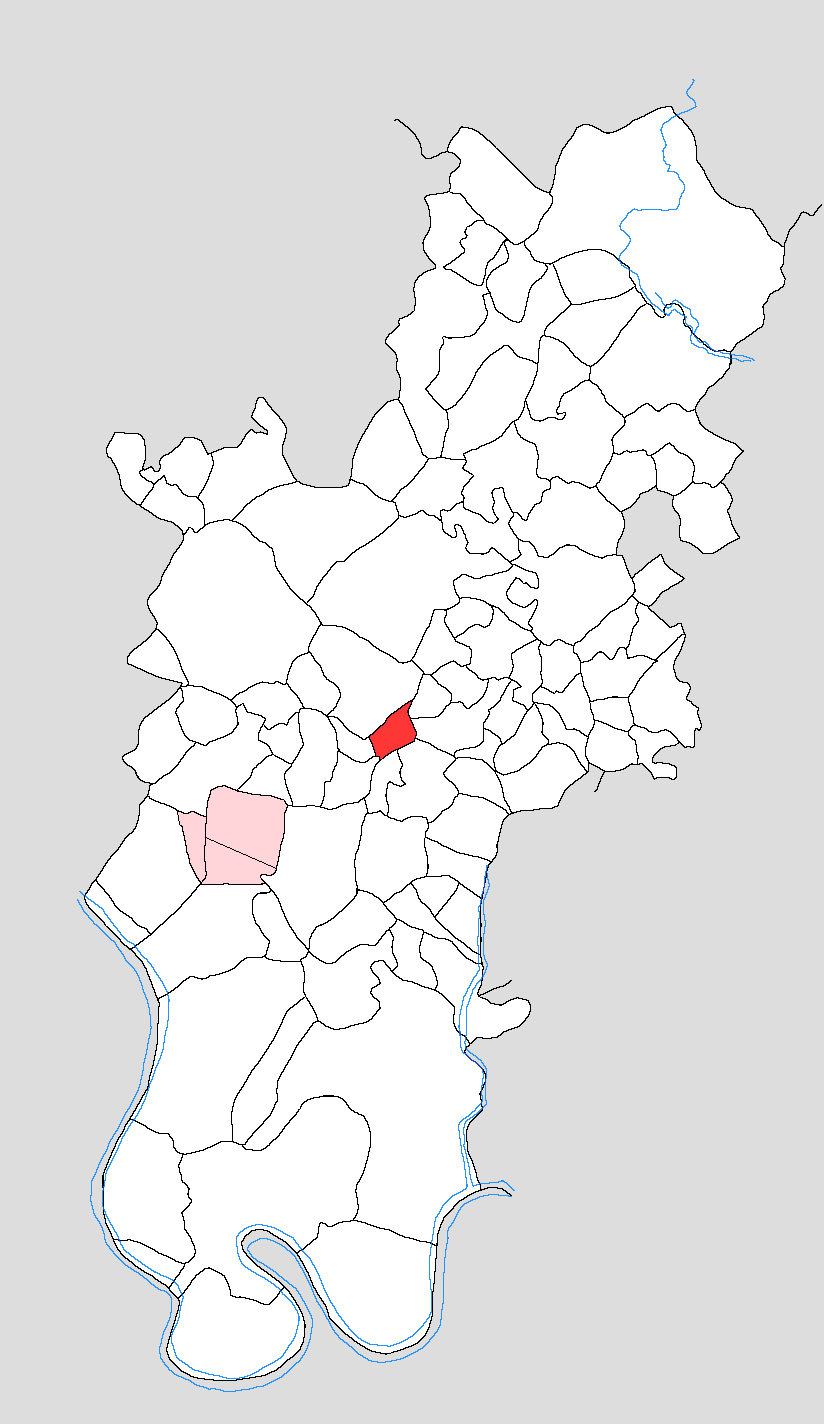
- Map showing Nagla Kalua in Tundla block

- Location in Uttar Pradesh, India
- Coordinates: 27.23948°N 78.27887°E
- Country: India
- State: Uttar Pradesh
- District: Firozabad
- Tehsil: Tundla

Area
  - Total: 1.135 km^{2} (0.438 sq mi)

Population (2011)
  - Total: 1,641
  - Density: 1,446/km^{2} (3,745/sq mi)
- Time zone: UTC+5:30 (IST)

Nagla Kalua (Naglā Kaluā) is a village in Tundla block of Firozabad district, Uttar Pradesh. As of 2011, it had a population of 1,641, in 257 households.

== Demographics ==
As of 2011, Nagla Kalua had a population of 1,641, in 257 households. This population was 53.4% male (876) and 46.6% female (765). The 0-6 age group numbered 261 (138 male and 123 female), making up 15.9% of the total population. 317 residents were members of Scheduled Castes, or 19.3% of the total.

The 1981 census recorded Nagla Kalua as having a population of 480 people (265 male and 215 female), in 78 households and 78 physical houses.

The 1961 census recorded Nagla Kalua (as "Nala Kalua") as comprising 1 hamlet, with a total population of 627 people (327 male and 300 female), in 95 households and 92 physical houses. The area of the village was given as 283 acres.

== Infrastructure ==
As of 2011, Nagla Kalua had 1 primary school; it did not have any healthcare facilities. Drinking water was provided by hand pump and tube well/borehole; there were no public toilets. The village did not have a post office or public library; there was at least some access to electricity for all purposes. Streets were made of both kachcha and pakka materials.
