= Jajpur, Firozabad =

Village in Uttar Pradesh, India

Jajpur
- Village
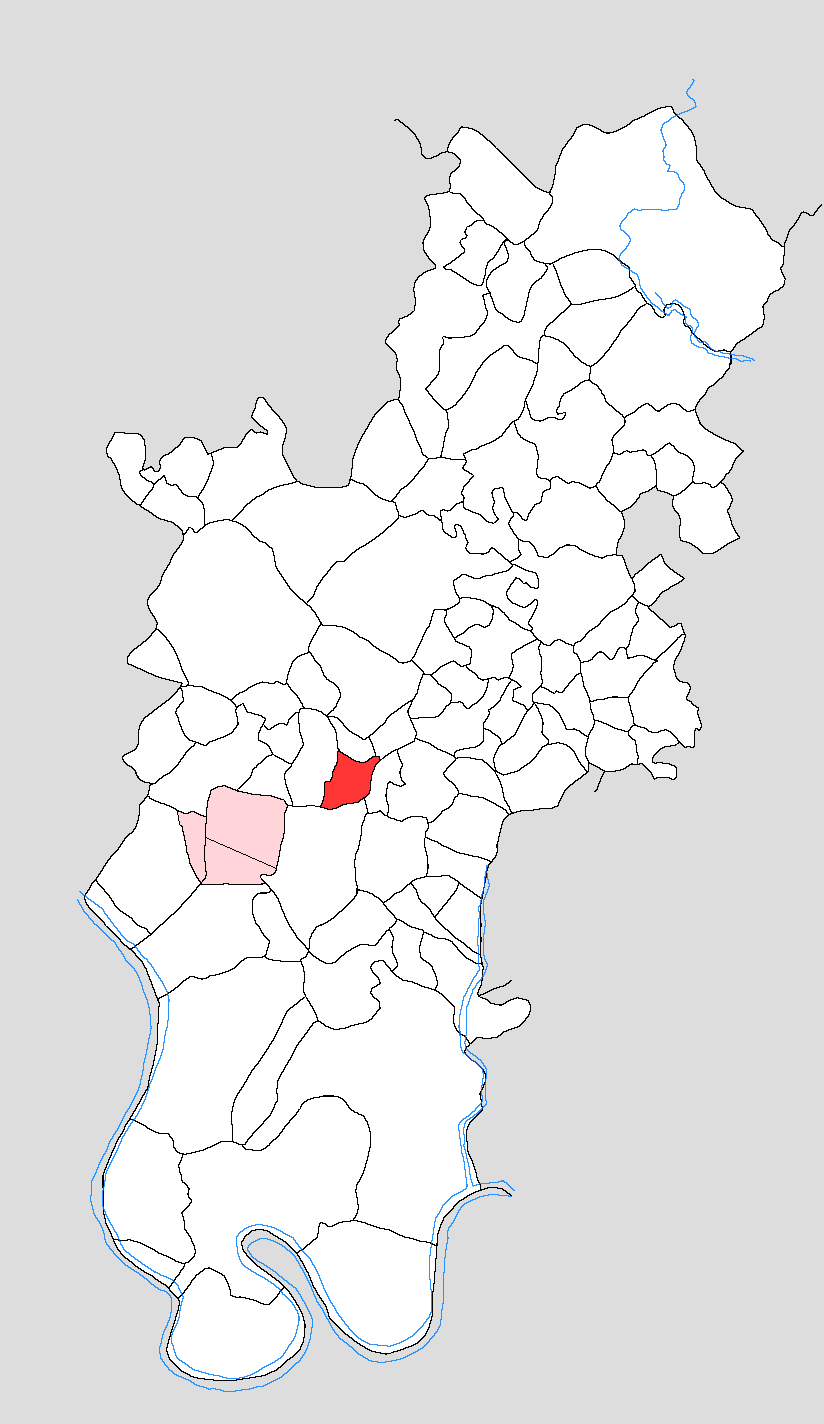
- Map showing Jajpur in Tundla block

- Location in Uttar Pradesh, India
- Coordinates: 27.22755°N 78.26983°E
- Country: India
- State: Uttar Pradesh
- District: Firozabad
- Tehsil: Tundla

Area
  - Total: 4.774 km^{2} (1.843 sq mi)

Population (2011)
  - Total: 1,439
  - Density: 301.4/km^{2} (780.7/sq mi)
- Time zone: UTC+5:30 (IST)
- PIN: 283204

Jajpur (Jājpur) is a village in Tundla block of Firozabad district, Uttar Pradesh. As of 2011, it has a population of 1,439, in 236 households.

== Demographics ==
As of 2011, Jajpur had a population of 1,439, in 236 households. This population was 52.7% male (758) and 47.3% female (681). The 0-6 age group numbered 214 (111 male and 103 female), making up 14.9% of the total population. 67 residents were members of Scheduled Castes, or 4.7% of the total.

The 1981 census recorded Jajpur as having a population of 756 people (404 male and 352 female), in 125 households and 125 physical houses.

The 1961 census recorded Jajpur as comprising 1 hamlet, with a total population of 594 people (322 male and 272 female), in 95 households and 74 physical houses. The area of the village was given as 366 acres.

== Infrastructure ==
As of 2011, Jajpur had 2 primary schools; it did not have any healthcare facilities. Drinking water was provided by tap and hand pump; there were no public toilets. The village had a public library but no post office; there was at least some access to electricity for all purposes. Streets were made of pakka materials.
