= Tundla =

- Town
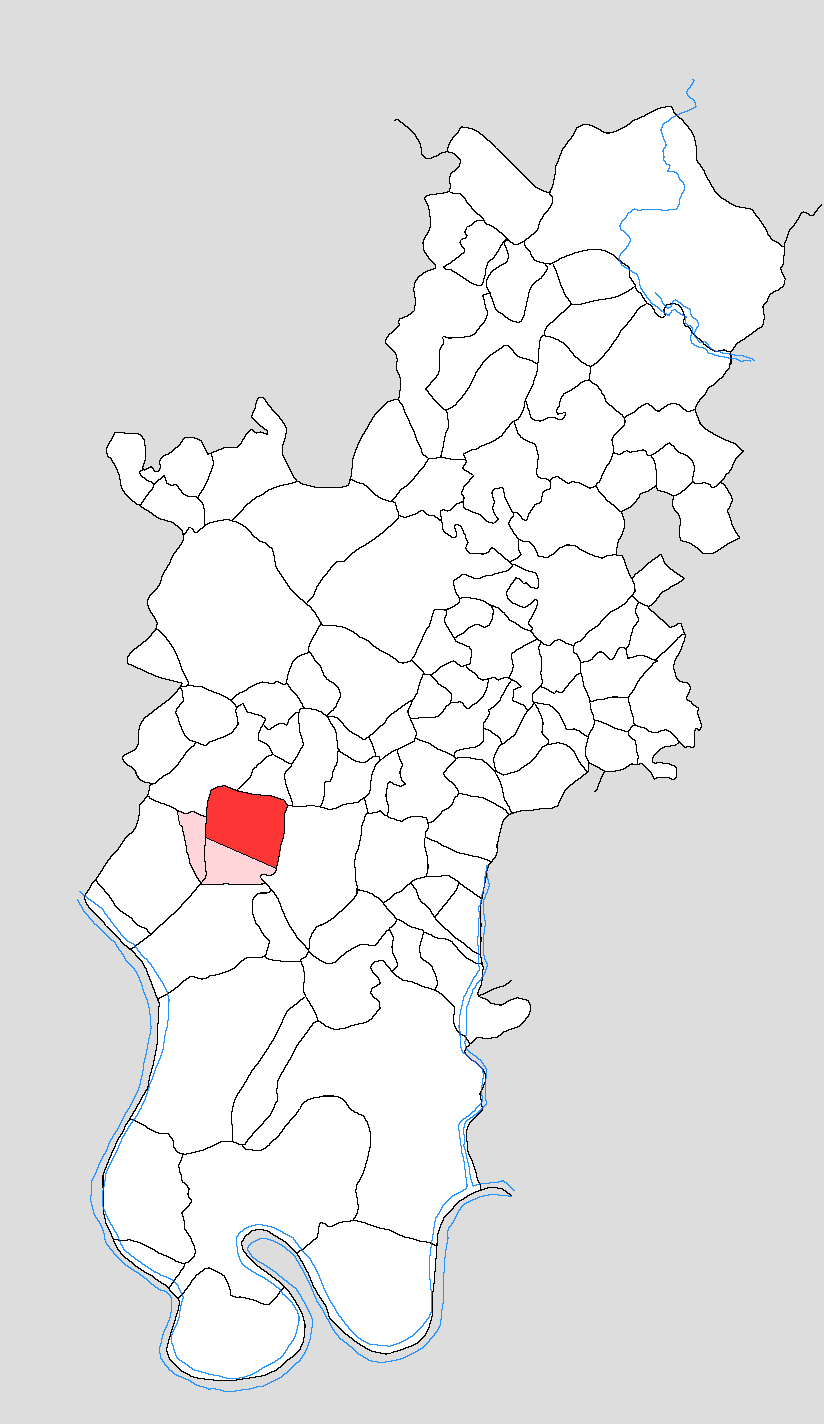
- Map showing Tundla in Tundla block

- Location in Uttar Pradesh, India
- Coordinates: 27.21460°N 78.23683°E
- Country: India
- State: Uttar Pradesh
- District: Firozabad

Government
  - Body: Municipal Corporation

Area
  - Total: 8.25 km^{2} (3.19 sq mi)
- Elevation: 168 m (551 ft)

Population (2011)
  - Total: 50,423
  - Density: 6,110/km^{2} (15,800/sq mi)

Languages
  - Official: Hindi
- Time zone: UTC+5:30 (IST)
- PIN: 283204
- Vehicle registration: UP-83

Tundla (Ṭūṇḍlā) is a town and a municipal board in Firozabad district in the Indian state of Uttar Pradesh. It is an important railway junction between the Delhi-Kanpur main line and the Agra branch line. Tundla is a railway town that sprang up when the railway was built in the late 1800s. It is served by Tundla Junction railway station. As of 2011, Tundla has a population of 50,423 people, in 8,744 households.

== Location ==
Tundla is situated on NH19 which connects it to nearest major city of Agra, 24 km away, 17 km away from District Firozabad and 5 km away from Etmadpur. It also serves as a major railway junction in North Central Railway zone. Numerous trains ply from capital city New Delhi which is 210 km away. Tundla is very near to Taj Yamuna Expressway. Tundla is well connected to other major cities of the country via regular trains. Due to proximity to Agra and hence the borders of Uttar Pradesh with Rajasthan, Madhya Pradesh states several inter-state bus services also serve the city. Intra-city transport typically consists of rickshaws and three-wheelers.

== History ==
Tundla is a railway town: before the opening of the railway, it was a mere agricultural village. That changed in 1862, when the East Indian Railway's main line was extended from Shikohabad to Tundla. This, along with the connecting branch line from Tundla to Agra, officially opened on 1 April 1862. A further extension of the main line from Tundla to Aligarh was completed in March 1863. Tundla's importance quickly grew, and it was constituted as a municipality in 1870. By the turn of the century, its bazar was one of the main commercial centres in what was then Agra district, and it was a point of export through the railway. As of 1901, the population of Tundla was 5,167, although only 1,601 people were described as living within the municipality limits. Besides the train station and market, the town had a post office, a police station, a dispensary, a sarai, and a couple of schools. There was also a "railway hospital". An Anglican church had also been built in Tundla.

Tundla is a town in Tundla tahsil of Firozabad district, Uttar Pradesh. In 1901 the population of Tundla was 3,044. It was a major junction on the East Indian Railway. Tundla has a rich heritage of British rule. High walled British constructions, huge barracks, a Catholic church built in 1860, an old Jain temple, Kothis (bungalows) of officers surrounded by sprawling lawns adorn Tundla as the main center of British administration. These old and beautiful British buildings have now been converted into railway quarters. Tundla also has a very old NCR College which was built by the British for their training purposes.

== Demographics ==
Historical population
Year	Pop.	±%
1911	3,863	—
1921	3,352	−13.2%
1931	2,716	−19.0%
1941	7,318	+169.4%
1951	5,651	−22.8%
1961	7,571	+34.0%
1971	9,660	+27.6%
1981	15,997	+65.6%
1991	21,463	+34.2%
2001	24,514	+14.2%
2011	50,423	+105.7%
Source: 2011 Census of India

As of the 2011 census, Tundla had a population of 50,423, in 8,744 households. This population was 52.6% male (26,510) and 47.4% female (23,913). The 0-6 age group numbered 6,154 (3,290 male and 2,864 female), or 12.2% of the total population. 9,603 residents were members of Scheduled Castes, or 19.0% of the total. The town's literacy rate was 86.4% (counting only people age 7 and up). The male literacy rate was 91.7%, while the female literacy rate was 80.6%.

=== Tehsil-wide statistics ===
As of 2011, Tundla tehsil had a population of 361,489, making it the least populous tehsil in the district. The overall population was predominantly rural, with 82.0% of the population (296,583 people) living in rural areas and 18.0% (64,906 people) living in the tehsil's three urban areas of Tundla, Tundla Kham, and Tundla Railway Colony. The tehsil's overall sex ratio was 867 females to every 1000 males. Its literacy rate was 74.8%; there was a 21.2% gender literacy gap, with 74.8% of males but only 63.4% of females capable of reading and writing. This discrepancy was higher in rural areas (23.4%) than in urban ones (12.3%).

== Politics ==
Tundla (Assembly constituency) represents the area.

== Transportation ==
Tundla Junction is an important station in Uttar Pradesh. It is located on the Delhi–Kanpur main line 25 km from Agra City. Tundla is a technical halt for changing drivers and guards for almost all of the trains on the New Delhi–Pandit Deen Dayal Junction / Lucknow sections. The station was built by the British and remains essentially unchanged. The railway station is a site in itself and takes one back to the pre-independence era. Tundla Junction is important for the people of Agra and for tourists providing connections to the east of the country, i.e. Kolkata, Guwahati, Patna etc., and especially to the northern state of Uttar Pradesh. It has connections to Agra Cantonment, Etawah, Aligarh Junction, Phaphund, Tundla, Kanpur Central railway station etc.

== Administration ==
Tundla is a statutory town with a Nagar Palika Parishad (municipal council) and it also serves as a tehsil headquarters.

== List of villages ==
The following 93 villages are counted as part of Tundla CD block:

1. Alai
2. Alawalpur
3. Anandpur
4. Anwara
5. Bachhgaon
6. Badanpur
7. Baghai
8. Baghai
9. Bankat
10. Basai
11. Bhainsabrijpur
12. Bhikanpur Bajhera
13. Chhakau
14. Chhitrai
15. Chulhaoli
16. Danauli
17. Deo Khera
18. Dharampur
19. Dhir Pur
20. Eta
21. Garai Thakur
22. Garhi Bhopal
23. Garhi Fateh
24. Garhi Harrai
25. Garhi Nirbhai
26. Garhi Purani
27. Garhi Sidhari
28. Garhi Ummed
29. Garhijafar
30. Garhiranchhor
31. Ghirauli
32. Gothua
33. Guarinagla Singhi
34. Hazratpur
35. Hemrajpur
36. Himmatpur
37. Husainpur
38. Jajpur
39. Jarkhi
40. Jondhri
41. Kartiki
42. Khera Langar
43. Kheria Jarkhi
44. Khushhal Pur
45. Kotki
46. Kutabpur Sahibmustaqil
47. Kutubpur Jarkhi
48. Kutubpur Sahibahat Mali
49. Lalgarhi
50. Latifpur
51. Madauli
52. Marsena
53. Mohammadabad
54. Mohammadpur
55. Mohammdi
56. Nagala Dal
57. Nagalapunu
58. Nagalaraiya
59. Nagla Balia
60. Nagla Barisani
61. Nagla Kalua
62. Nagla Sikandar
63. Nagla Suraj
64. Niamatpur
65. Pachokara
66. Paharipur Bhodela
67. Panwari
68. Piprauli
69. Pratapur
70. Raja Wali
71. Ram Pur
72. Ramgarh Urf Ummergarh
73. Ramnagarjarkhi
74. Rampur
75. Rampur Katailia
76. Rasulabad
77. Rudau Mustaqil
78. Rudau Pahar Pur
79. Rudaunat Mali
80. Sakhawat Pur
81. Salempur
82. Sarainoor Mahal
83. Satauli
84. Seosinghpur
85. Shekhpur Mandanpur
86. Shekhupur Rajmal
87. Sikrari
88. Siraulia
89. Tikri
90. Tilokpur
91. Tundla Kham (CT)
92. Tundla Railway Colony (CT)
93. Tundli
