= Badanpur, Tundla =

Village in Uttar Pradesh, India

Badanpur
- Village
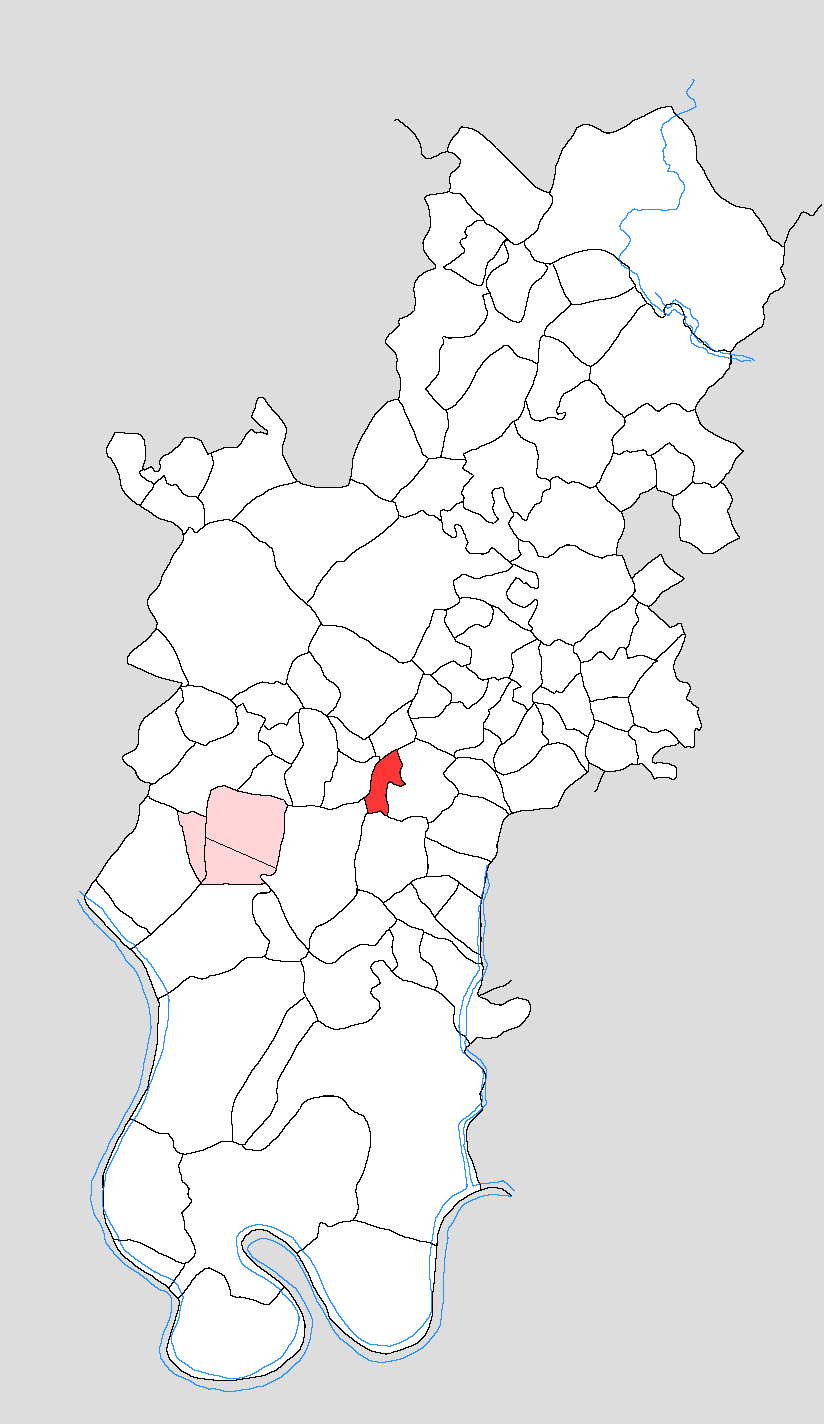
- Map showing Badanpur in Tundla block

- Location in Uttar Pradesh, India
- Coordinates: 27.22589°N 78.27558°E
- Country: India
- State: Uttar Pradesh
- District: Firozabad
- Tehsil: Tundla

Area
  - Total: 1.00 km^{2} (0.39 sq mi)

Population (2011)
  - Total: 498
  - Density: 498/km^{2} (1,290/sq mi)
- Time zone: UTC+5:30 (IST)
- PIN: 283204

Badanpur is a village in Tundla block of Firozabad district, Uttar Pradesh. As of 2011, it has a population of 498, in 80 households.

== Demographics ==
As of 2011, Badanpur had a population of 498, in 80 households. This population was 54.8% male (273) and 45.2% female (225). The 0-6 age group numbered 68 (31 male and 37 female), making up 13.7% of the total population. 155 residents were members of Scheduled Castes, or 31.1% of the total.

The 1981 census recorded Badanpur as having a population of 251 people (145 male and 106 female), in 35 households and 35 physical houses.

The 1961 census recorded Badanpur as comprising 1 hamlet, with a total population of 194 people (106 male and 88 female), in 32 households and 24 physical houses. The area of the village was given as 250 acres.

== Infrastructure ==
As of 2011, Badanpur had 1 primary school; it did not have any healthcare facilities. Drinking water was provided by hand pump and tube well/borehole; there were no public toilets. The village did not have a post office or public library; there was at least some access to electricity for all purposes. Streets were made of both kachcha and pakka materials.
