= Bankat, Firozabad =

Village in Uttar Pradesh, India

Bankat
- Village
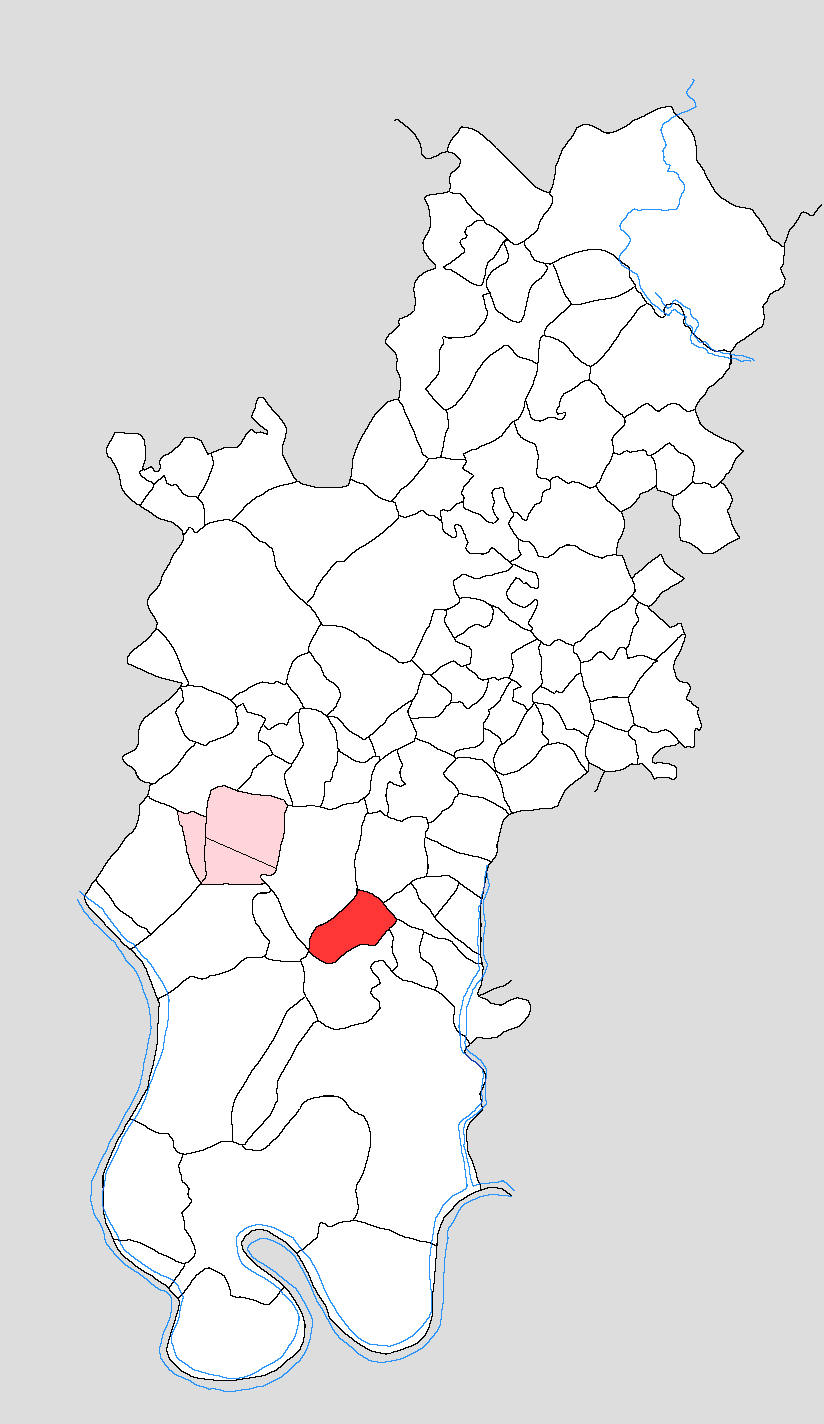
- Map showing Bankat in Tundla block

- Location in Uttar Pradesh, India
- Coordinates: 27.19055°N 78.27169°E
- Country: India
- State: Uttar Pradesh
- District: Firozabad
- Tehsil: Tundla

Area
  - Total: 2.80 km^{2} (1.08 sq mi)

Population (2011)
  - Total: 2,402
  - Density: 858/km^{2} (2,220/sq mi)
- Time zone: UTC+5:30 (IST)
- PIN: 283204

Bankat (Bankaṭ) is a village in Tundla block of Firozabad district, Uttar Pradesh. As of 2011, it has a population of 2,402, in 437 households.

== Demographics ==
As of 2011, Bankat had a population of 2,402, in 437 households. This population was 54.3% male (1,305) and 45.7% female (1,097). The 0-6 age group numbered 375 (203 male and 172 female), making up 15.6% of the total population. 635 residents were members of Scheduled Castes, or 26.4% of the total.

The 1981 census recorded Bankat (spelled "Bankot" in English but "Bankat" in Hindi) as having a population of 1,596 people (882 male and 714 female), in 246 households and 243 physical houses.

The 1961 census recorded Bankat as comprising 3 hamlets, with a total population of 1,105 people (593 male and 512 female), in 180 households and 144 physical houses. The area of the village was given as 724 acres.

== Infrastructure ==
As of 2011, Bankat had 1 primary school and 1 primary health centre. Drinking water was provided by hand pump; there were no public toilets. The village did not have a post office or public library; there was at least some access to electricity for all purposes. Streets were made of both kachcha and pakka materials.
