= Anwara, Uttar Pradesh =

Village in Uttar Pradesh, India

Anwara
- Village
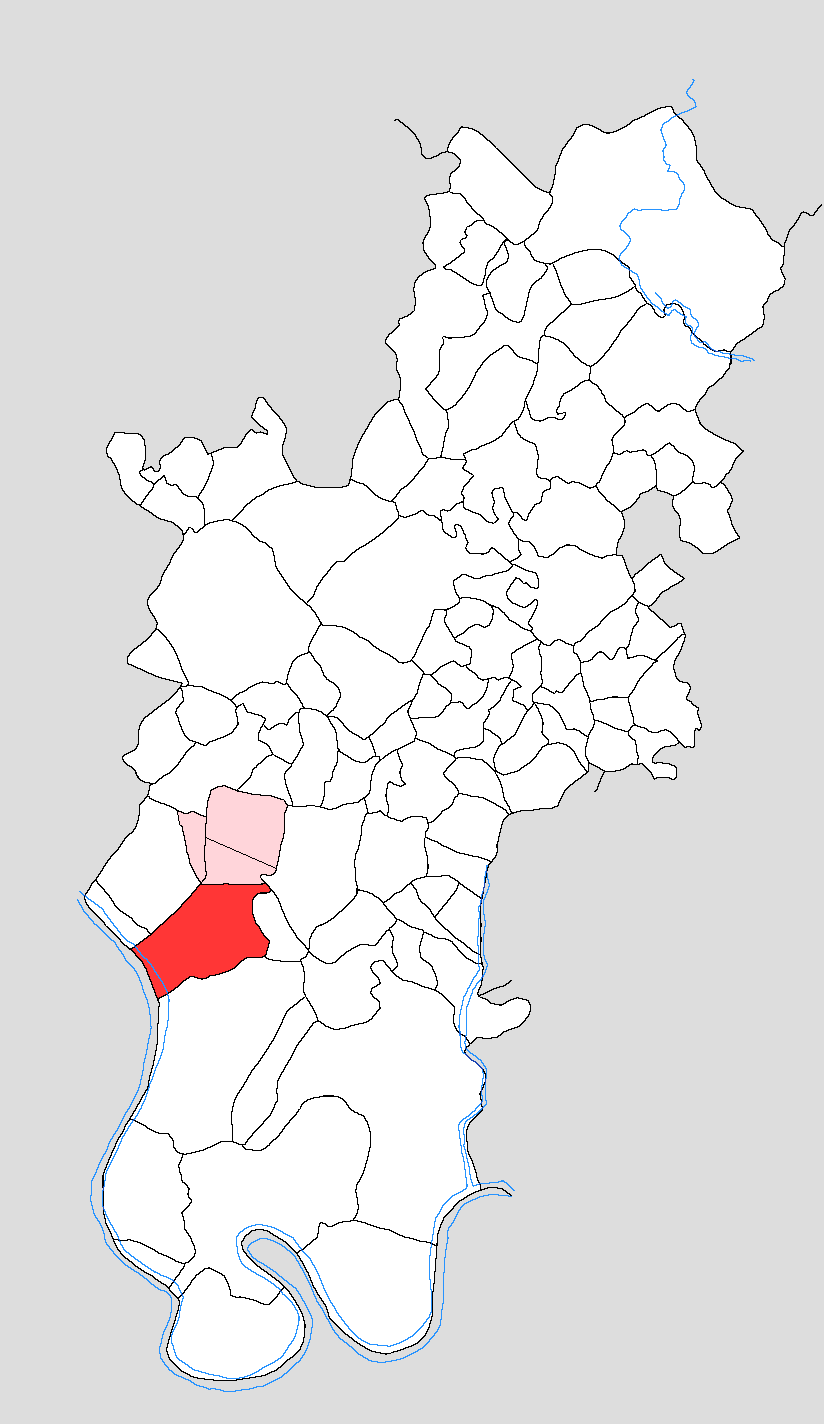
- Map showing Anwara in Tundla block

- Location in Uttar Pradesh, India
- Coordinates: 27.18149°N 78.22641°E
- Country: India
- State: Uttar Pradesh
- District: Firozabad
- Tehsil: Tundla

Area
  - Total: 6.921 km^{2} (2.672 sq mi)

Population (2011)
  - Total: 7,945
  - Density: 1,148/km^{2} (2,973/sq mi)
- Time zone: UTC+5:30 (IST)
- PIN: 283204

Anwara (Anwārā) is a village in Tundla block of Firozabad district, Uttar Pradesh. As of 2011, it has a population of 7,945, in 1,228 households.

== Demographics ==
As of 2011, Anwara had a population of 7,945, in 1,228 households. This population was 53.2% male (4,230) and 46.8% female (3,715). The 0-6 age group numbered 1,495 (803 male and 692 female), making up 18.8% of the total population. 1,922 residents were members of Scheduled Castes, or 24.2% of the total.

The 1981 census recorded Anwara as having a population of 3,763 people (2,078 male and 1,685 female), in 592 households and 572 physical houses.

The 1961 census recorded Anwara as comprising 8 hamlets, with a total population of 2,403 people (1,287 male and 1,116 female), in 420 households and 318 physical houses. The area of the village was given as 1,728 acres and it had a medical practitioner at that point.

== Infrastructure ==
As of 2011, Anwara had 4 primary schools; it did not have any healthcare facilities. Drinking water was provided by tap, hand pump, and tube well/borehole; there were no public toilets. The village had a public library but no post office; there was at least some access to electricity for all purposes. Streets were made of both kachcha and pakka materials.
