= Basai, Firozabad =

Village in Uttar Pradesh, India

Basai
- Village
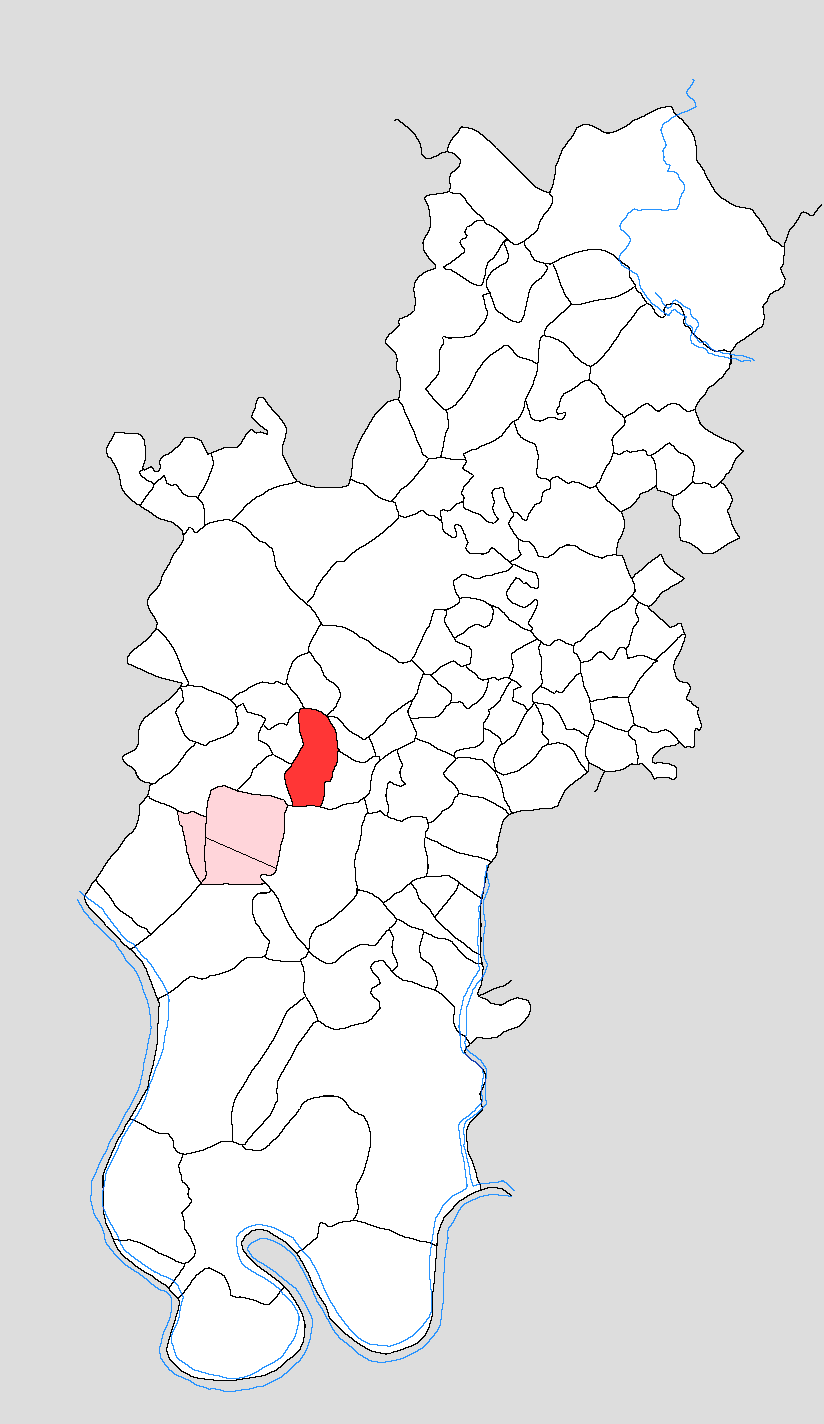
- Map showing Basai in Tundla block

- Location in Uttar Pradesh, India
- Coordinates: 27.2332°N 78.25843°E
- Country: India
- State: Uttar Pradesh
- District: Firozabad
- Tehsil: Tundla

Area
  - Total: 2.756 km^{2} (1.064 sq mi)

Population (2011)
  - Total: 2,432
  - Density: 882.4/km^{2} (2,286/sq mi)
- Time zone: UTC+5:30 (IST)

Basai (Basaī) is a village in Tundla block of Firozabad district, Uttar Pradesh. As of 2011, it has a population of 2,432, in 408 households.

== Demographics ==
As of 2011, Basai had a population of 2,432, in 408 households. This population was 53.9% male (1,312) and 46.1% female (1,120). The 0-6 age group numbered 405 (231 male and 174 female), making up 17.8% of the total population. 1,198 residents were members of Scheduled Castes, or 33.2% of the total.

The 1981 census recorded Basai as having a population of 1,239 people (708 male and 531 female), in 195 households and 193 physical houses.

The 1961 census recorded Basai as comprising 1 hamlet, with a total population of 812 people (428 male and 384 female), in 136 households and 98 physical houses. The area of the village was given as 684 acres.

== Infrastructure ==
As of 2011, Basai had 3 primary schools; it did not have any healthcare facilities. Drinking water was provided by hand pump and tube well/borehole; there were no public toilets. The village had a public library but no post office; there was at least some access to electricity for all purposes. Streets were made of both kachcha and pakka materials.
