= Eta, Firozabad =

Village in Uttar Pradesh, India

Eta
- Village
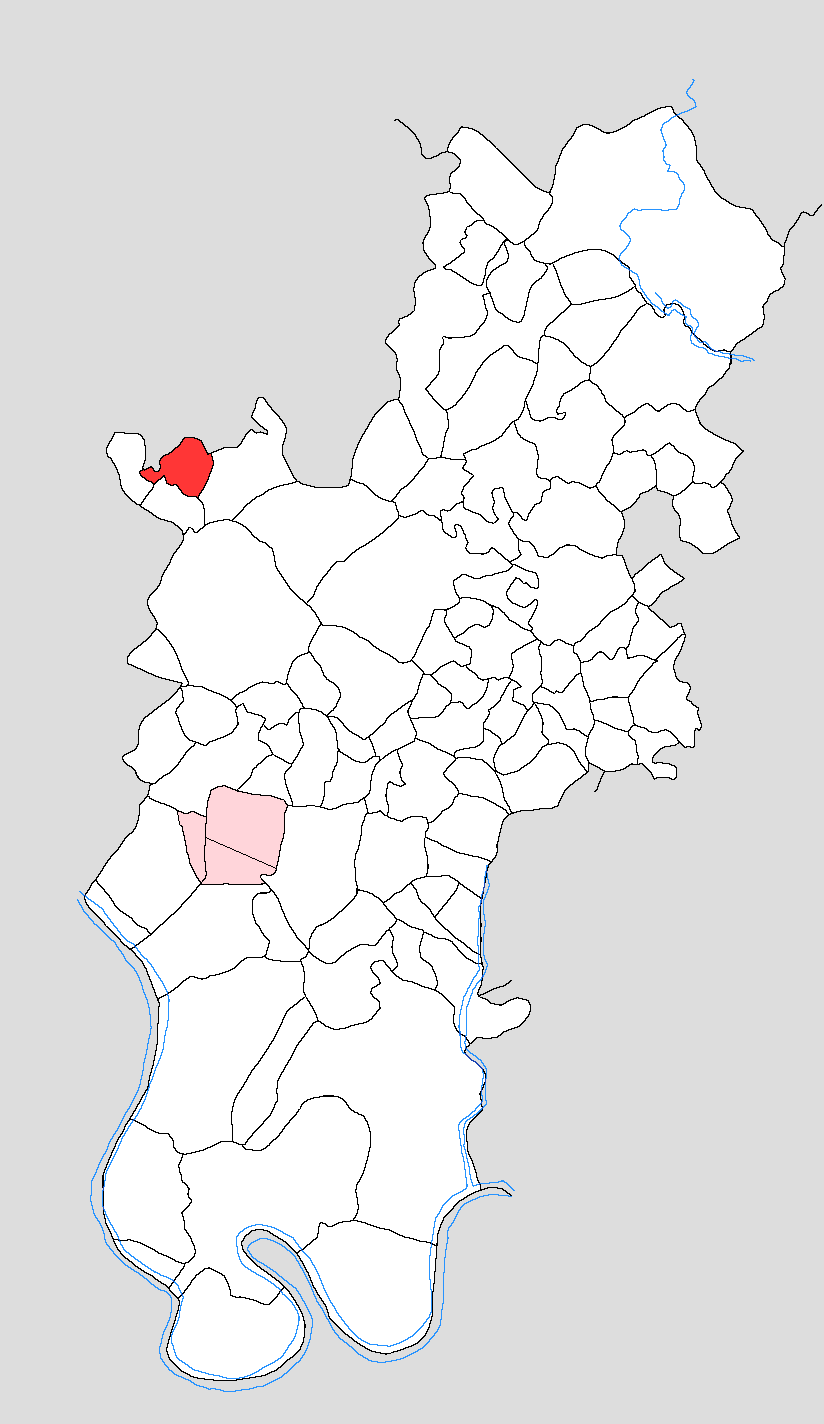
- Map showing Eta in Tundla block

- Location in Uttar Pradesh, India
- Coordinates: 27.30902°N 78.21914°E
- Country: India
- State: Uttar Pradesh
- District: Firozabad
- Tehsil: Tundla

Area
  - Total: 1.833 km^{2} (0.708 sq mi)

Population (2011)
  - Total: 1,380
  - Density: 753/km^{2} (1,950/sq mi)
- Time zone: UTC+5:30 (IST)
- PIN: 283204

Eta (Eṭā) is a village in Tundla block of Firozabad district, Uttar Pradesh, India. As of 2011, it had a population of 1,380, in 211 households.

== Demographics ==
As of 2011, Eta had a population of 1,380, in 211 households. This population was 55.5% male (766) and 44.5% female (614). The 0-6 age group numbered 188 (105 male and 83 female), making up 13.6% of the total population. 590 residents were members of Scheduled Castes, or 42.8% of the total.

The 1981 census recorded Eta (as "Aita") as having a population of 935 people (528 male and 407 female), in 158 households and 155 physical houses.

The 1961 census recorded Eta (as "Etah") as comprising 1 hamlet, with a total population of 672 people (371 male and 301 female), in 118 households and 100 physical houses. The area of the village was given as 458 acres.

== Infrastructure ==
As of 2011, Eta had 1 primary school; it did not have any healthcare facilities. Drinking water was provided by hand pump; there were no public toilets. The village did not have a post office or public library; there was at least some access to electricity for all purposes. Streets were made of both kachcha and pakka materials.
