= Garhi Nirbhai =

Village in Uttar Pradesh, India

- Village
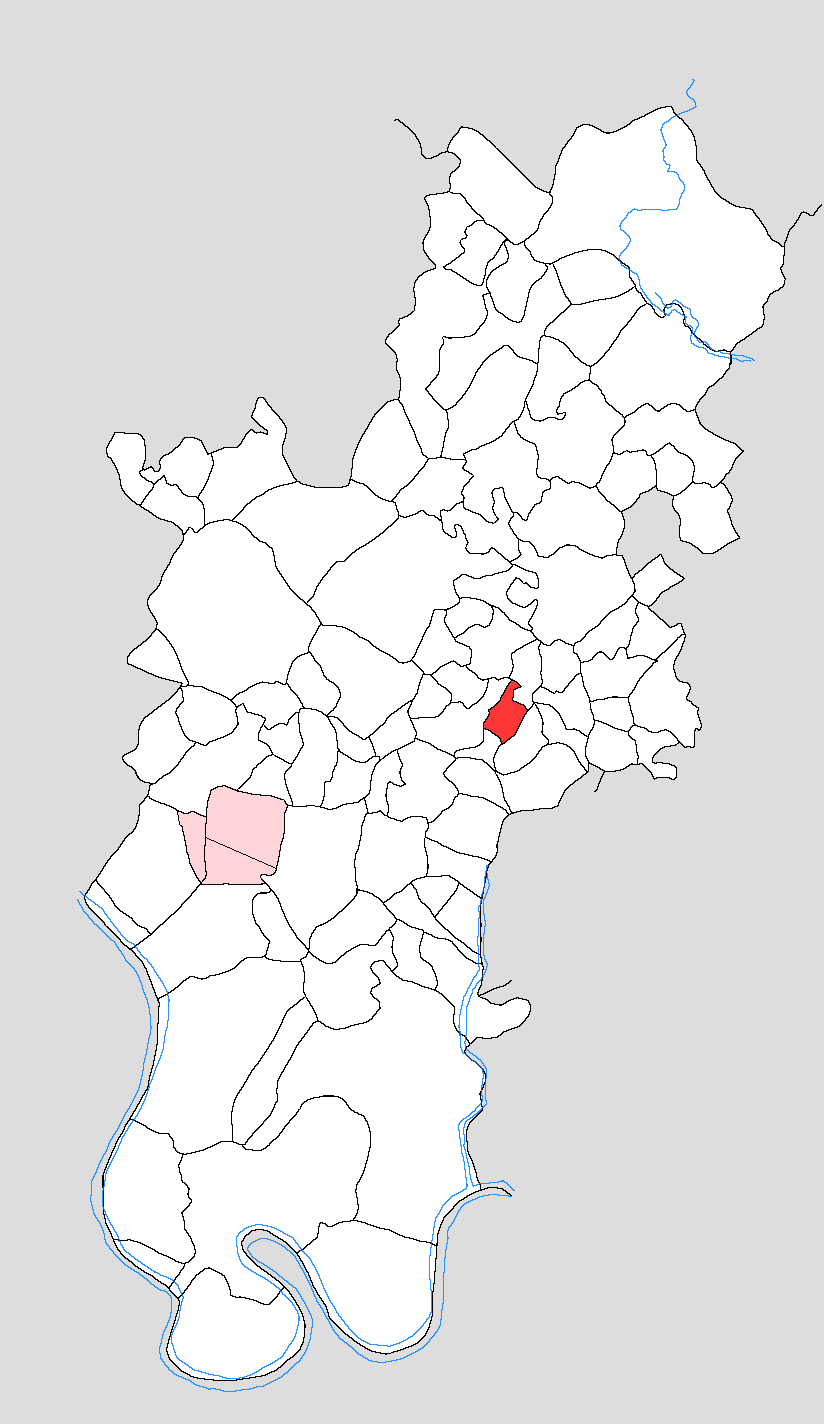
- Map showing Garhi Nirbhai in Tundla block

- Location in Uttar Pradesh, India
- Coordinates: 27.24354°N 78.31044°E
- Country: India
- State: Uttar Pradesh
- District: Firozabad
- Tehsil: Tundla

Area
  - Total: 1.212 km^{2} (0.468 sq mi)

Population (2011)
  - Total: 3,156
  - Density: 2,604/km^{2} (6,744/sq mi)
- Time zone: UTC+5:30 (IST)
- PIN: 283203

Garhi Nirbhai (Gaṛhī Nirbhāī) is a village in Tundla block of Firozabad district, Uttar Pradesh. As of 2011, it has a population of 3,156, in 464 households.

== Demographics ==
As of 2011, Garhi Nirbhai had a population of 3,156 in 464 households. This population was 53.7% male (1,695) and 46.3% female (1,461). The 0-6 age group numbered 510 (271 male and 239 female), making up 16.2% of the total population. 208 residents were members of Scheduled Castes, or 6.6% of the total.

The 1981 census recorded Garhi Nirbhai (spelled "Garhi Nirm" in English, but "Gadhi Nirbhai" in Hindi) as having a population of 1,785 people (956 male and 829 female), in 268 households and 254 physical houses.

The 1961 census recorded Garhi Nirbhai as comprising 1 hamlet, with a total population of 1,161 people (601 male and 560 female), in 160 households and 145 physical houses. The area of the village was given as 303 acres.

== Infrastructure ==
As of 2011, Garhi Nirbhai had 1 primary school; it did not have any healthcare facilities. Drinking water was provided by hand pump and tube well/borehole; there were no public toilets. The village did not have a post office or public library; there was at least some access to electricity for all purposes. Streets were made of both kachcha and pakka materials.
