= Nagla Raiya =

Village in Uttar Pradesh, India

- Village
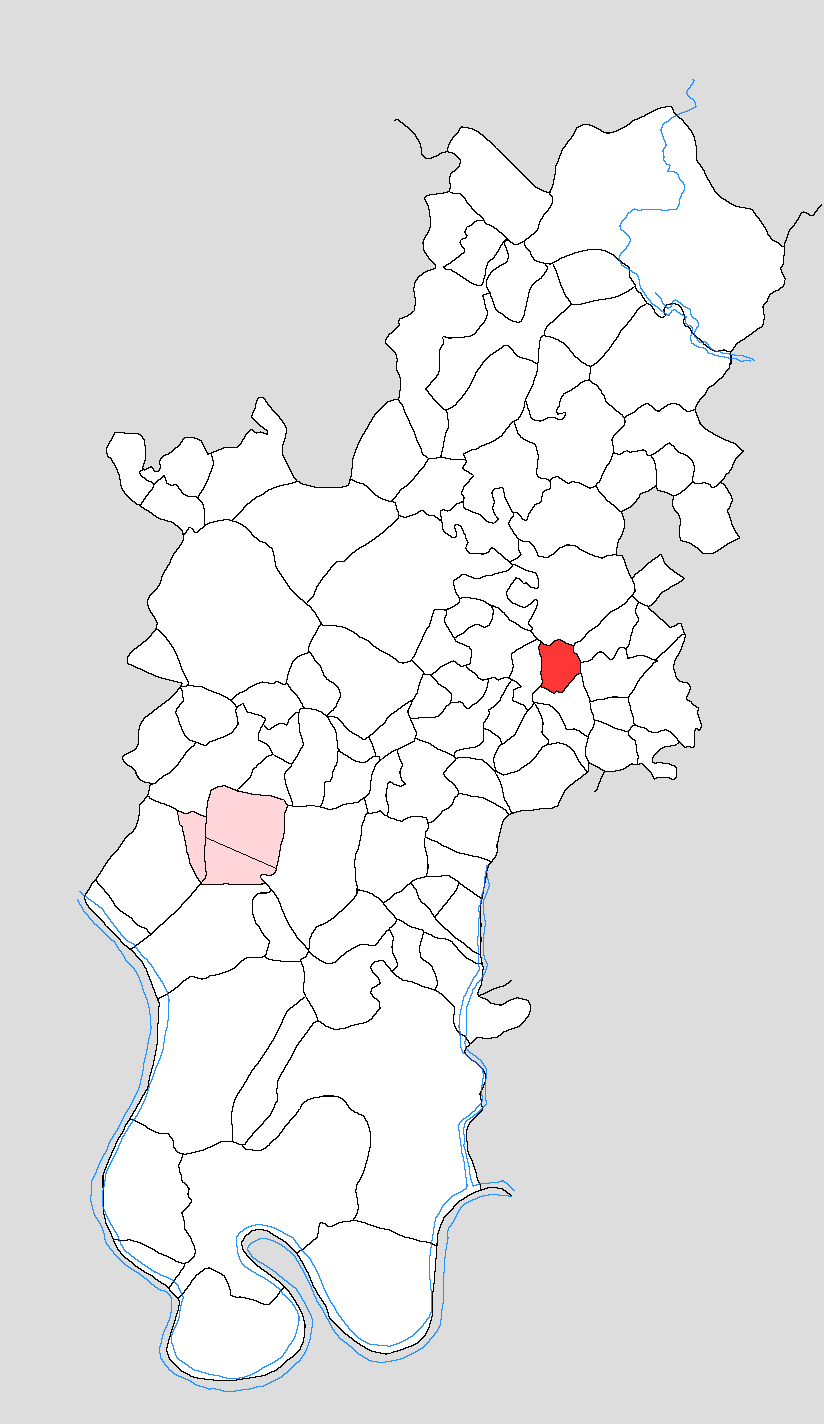
- Map showing Nagla Raiya in Tundla block

- Location in Uttar Pradesh, India
- Coordinates: 27.25767°N 78.32749°E
- Country: India
- State: Uttar Pradesh
- District: Firozabad
- Tehsil: Tundla

Area
  - Total: 1.22 km^{2} (0.47 sq mi)

Population (2011)
  - Total: 613
  - Density: 502/km^{2} (1,300/sq mi)
- Time zone: UTC+5:30 (IST)
- PIN: 283203

Nagla Raiya (Naglā Raīyā) is a village in Tundla block of Firozabad district, Uttar Pradesh, India. As of 2011, it had a population of 613, in 85 households.

== Demographics ==
As of 2011, Nagla Raiya had a population of 613, in 85 households. This population was 55.5% male (340) and 44.5% female (273). The 0-6 age group numbered 99 (55 male and 44 female), making up 16.2% of the total population. 211 residents were members of Scheduled Castes, or 34.4% of the total.

The 1981 census recorded Nagla Raiya as having a population of 295 people (168 male and 127 female), in 48 households and 44 physical houses.

The 1961 census recorded Nagla Raiya as comprising 1 hamlet, with a total population of 173 people (94 male and 79 female), in 36 households and 27 physical houses. The area of the village was given as 301 acres.

== Infrastructure ==
As of 2011, Nagla Raiya had 1 primary school; it did not have any healthcare facilities. Drinking water was provided by hand pump and tube well/borehole; there were no public toilets. The village did not have a post office or public library; there was at least some access to electricity for all purposes. Streets were made of both kachcha and pakka materials.
