= Marsena, India =

Village in Uttar Pradesh, India

Marsena
- Village
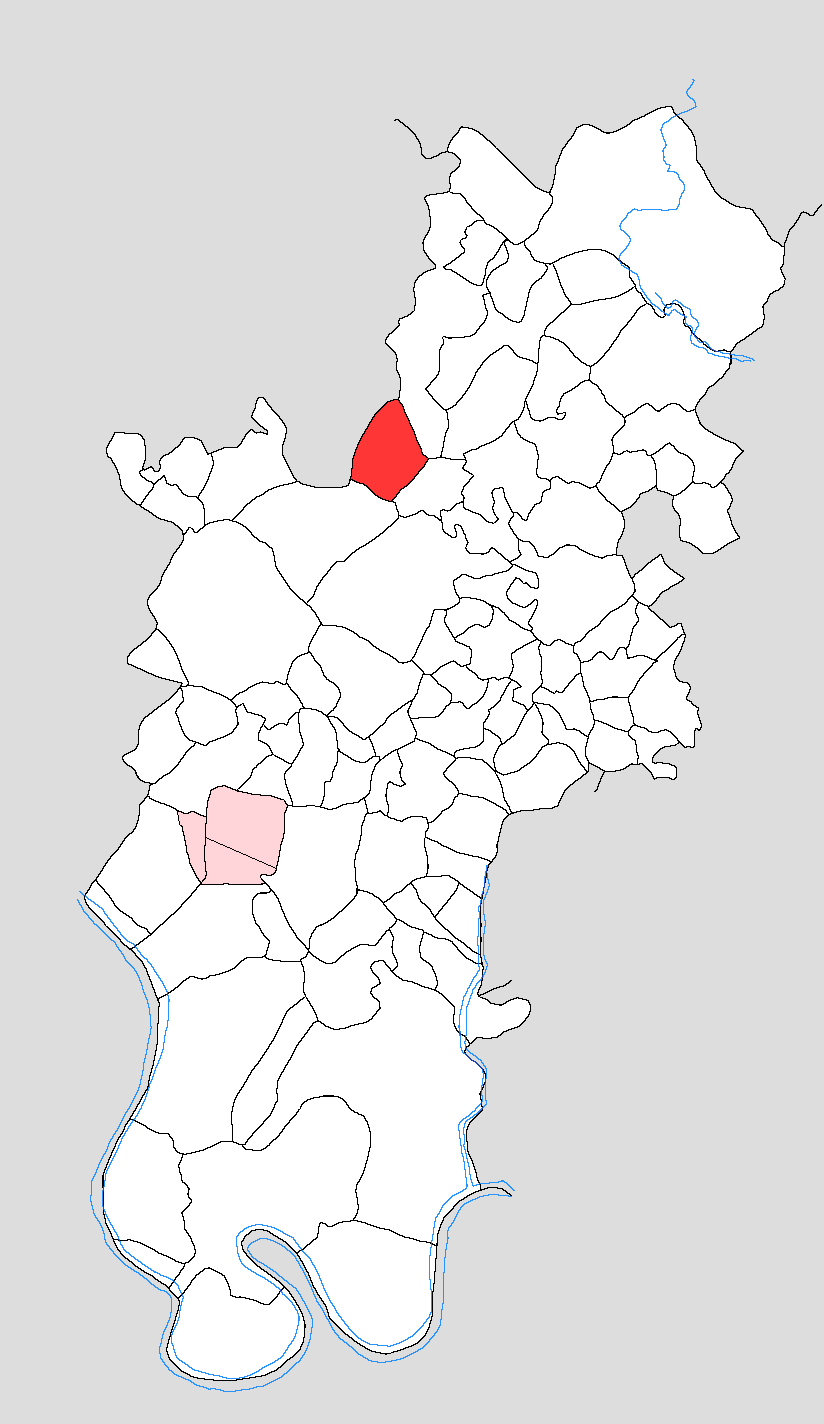
- Map showing Marsena in Tundla block

- Location in Uttar Pradesh, India
- Coordinates: 27.31237°N 78.27669°E
- Country: India
- State: Uttar Pradesh
- District: Firozabad
- Tehsil: Tundla

Area
  - Total: 4.037 km^{2} (1.559 sq mi)

Population (2011)
  - Total: 2,093
  - Density: 518.5/km^{2} (1,343/sq mi)
- Time zone: UTC+5:30 (IST)
- PIN: 283204

Marsena (Marsenā) is a village in Tundla block of Firozabad district, Uttar Pradesh. As of 2011, it has a population of 2,093, in 344 households.

== Demographics ==
As of 2011, Marsena had a population of 2,093, in 344 households. This population was 53.3% male (1,115) and 46.7% female (978). The 0-6 age group numbered 353 (172 male and 181 female), making up 16.9% of the total population. 429 residents were members of Scheduled Castes, or 20.5% of the total.

The 1981 census recorded Marsena as having a population of 1,450 people (802 male and 648 female), in 257 households and 253 physical houses.

The 1961 census recorded Marsena as comprising 2 hamlets, with a total population of 1,025 people (555 male and 470 female), in 170 households and 145 physical houses. The area of the village was given as 1,002 acres.

== Infrastructure ==
As of 2011, Marsena had 1 primary school; it did not have any healthcare facilities. Drinking water was provided by hand pump; there were no public toilets. The village did not have a post office or public library; there was at least some access to electricity for all purposes. Streets were made of both kachcha and pakka materials.
