= Latifpur, Firozabad =

Village in Uttar Pradesh, India

Latifpur
- Village
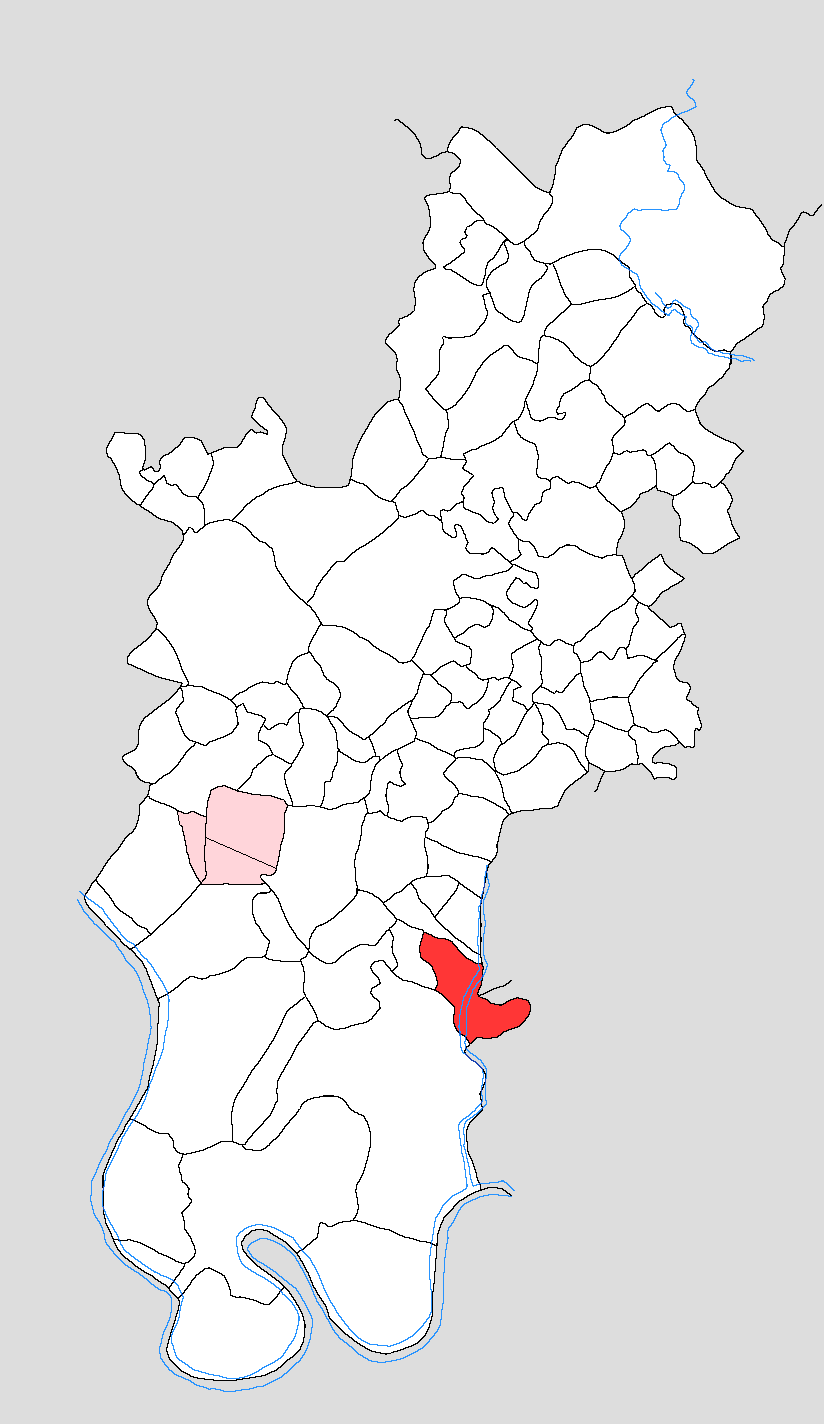
- Map showing Latifpur in Tundla block

- Location in Uttar Pradesh, India
- Coordinates: 27.18305°N 78.29324°E
- Country: India
- State: Uttar Pradesh
- District: Firozabad
- Tehsil: Tundla

Area
  - Total: 1.561 km^{2} (0.603 sq mi)

Population (2011)
  - Total: 931
  - Density: 596/km^{2} (1,540/sq mi)
- Time zone: UTC+5:30 (IST)
- PIN: 283204

Latifpur (Latīfpur) is a village in Tundla block of Firozabad district, Uttar Pradesh, India. As of 2011, it has a population of 931, in 160 households.

== Demographics ==
As of 2011, Latifpur had a population of 931, in 160 households. This population was 56.1% male (522) and 43.9% female (409). The 0-6 age group numbered 153 (84 male and 69 female), making up 16.4% of the total population. 321 residents were members of Scheduled Castes, or 34.5% of the total.

The 1981 census recorded Latifpur as having a population of 709 people (393 male and 316 female), in 116 households and 116 physical houses.

The 1961 census recorded Latifpur as comprising 1 hamlet, with a total population of 454 people (258 male and 196 female), in 84 households and 76 physical houses. The area of the village was given as 386 acres.

== Infrastructure ==
As of 2011, Latifpur had 1 primary school; it did not have any healthcare facilities. Drinking water was provided by tap, hand pump, and tube well/borehole; there were no public toilets. The village did not have a post office or public library; there was at least some access to electricity for all purposes. Streets were made of both kachcha and pakka materials.
