= Nagla Dal =

Village in Uttar Pradesh, India

- Village
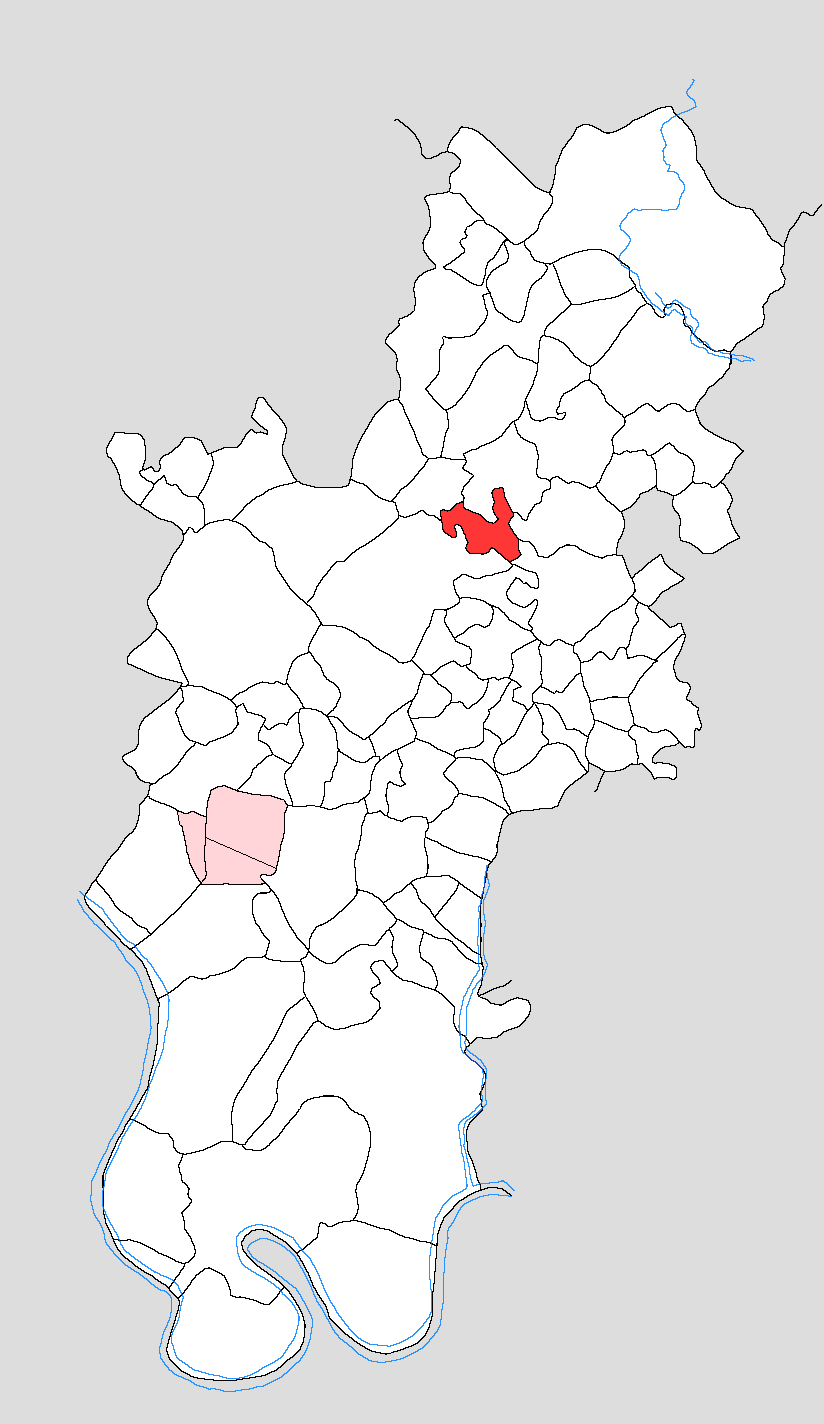
- Map showing Nagla Dal in Tundla block

- Location in Uttar Pradesh, India
- Coordinates: 27.29138°N 78.30274°E
- Country: India
- State: Uttar Pradesh
- District: Firozabad
- Tehsil: Tundla

Area
  - Total: 2.67 km^{2} (1.03 sq mi)

Population (2011)
  - Total: 2,471
  - Density: 925/km^{2} (2,400/sq mi)
- Time zone: UTC+5:30 (IST)
- PIN: 283204

Nagla Dal (Naglā Dal) is a village in Tundla block of Firozabad district, Uttar Pradesh, India. As of 2011, it had a population of 2,471, in 383 households.

== Demographics ==
As of 2011, Nagla Dal had a population of 2,471, in 383 households. This population was 55.2% male (1,363) and 44.8% female (1,108). The 0-6 age group numbered 461 (262 male and 199 female), making up 18.7% of the total population. 614 residents were members of Scheduled Castes, or 24.8% of the total.

The 1981 census recorded Nagla Dal as having a population of 1,304 people (710 male and 594 female), in 229 households and 223 physical houses.

The 1961 census recorded Nagla Dal as comprising 1 hamlet, with a total population of 831 people (453 male and 378 female), in 147 households and 103 physical houses. The area of the village was given as 684 acres.

== Infrastructure ==
As of 2011, Nagla Dal had 1 primary school; it did not have any healthcare facilities. Drinking water was provided by hand pump; there were no public toilets. The village did not have a post office or public library; there was at least some access to electricity for all purposes. Streets were made of both kachcha and pakka materials.
