= Salempur, Firozabad =

Village in Uttar Pradesh, India

Salempur
- Village
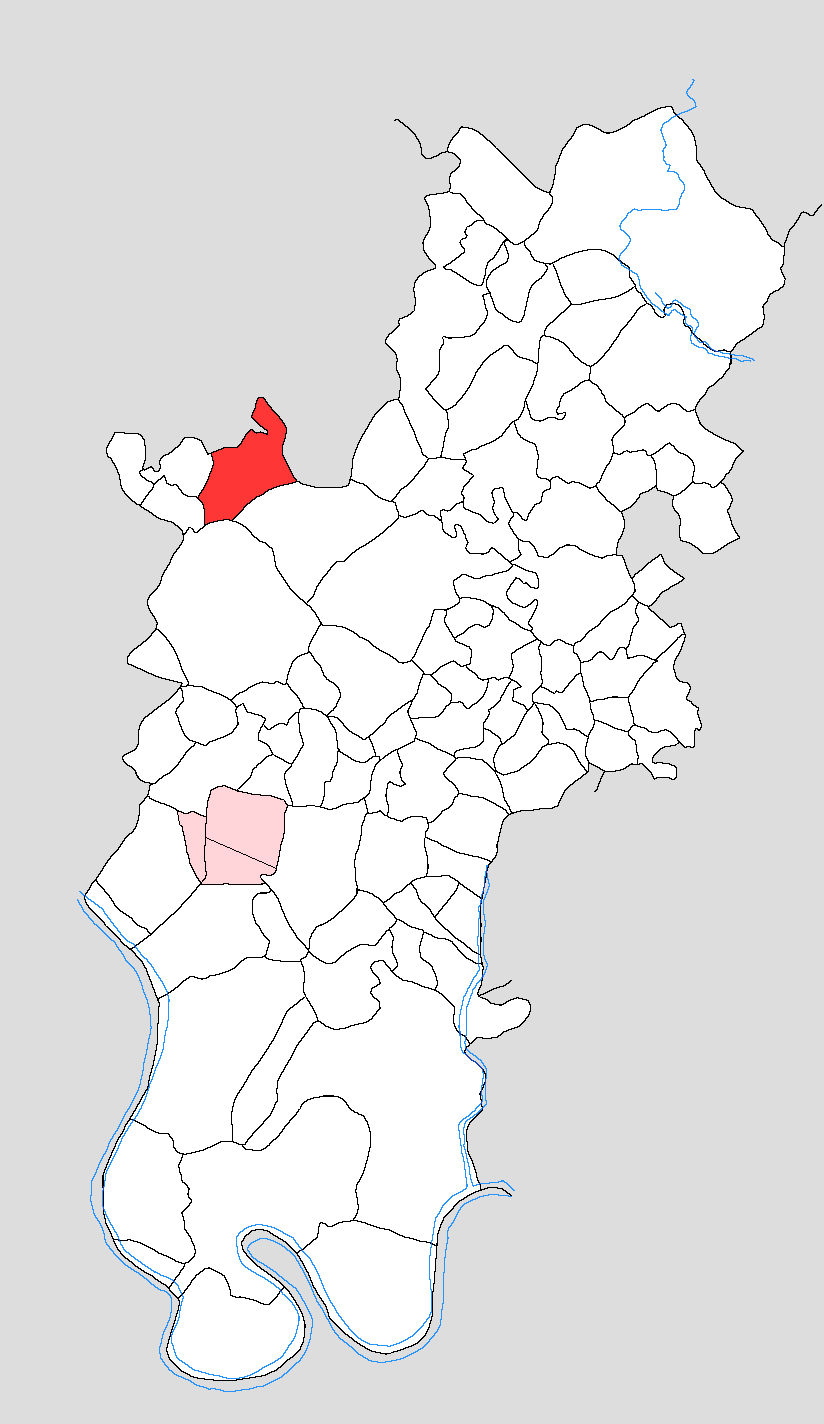
- Map showing Salempur in Tundla block

- Location in Uttar Pradesh, India
- Coordinates: 27.30483°N 78.23384°E
- Country: India
- State: Uttar Pradesh
- District: Firozabad
- Tehsil: Tundla

Area
  - Total: 3.967 km^{2} (1.532 sq mi)

Population (2011)
  - Total: 3,355
  - Density: 845.7/km^{2} (2,190/sq mi)
- Time zone: UTC+5:30 (IST)
- PIN: 283204

Salempur (Salempur) is a village in Tundla block of Firozabad district, Uttar Pradesh, India. As of 2011, it had a population of 3,355, in 579 households.

== Demographics ==
As of 2011, Salempur had a population of 3,385, in 579 households. This population was 53.2% male (1,785) and 46.8% female (1,570). The 0-6 age group numbered 569 (289 male and 280 female), making up 17.0% of the total population. 1,134 residents were members of Scheduled Castes, or 33.8% of the total.

The 1981 census recorded Salempur as having a population of 2,047 people (1,129 male and 918 female), in 323 households and 312 physical houses.

The 1961 census recorded Salempur as comprising 3 hamlets, with a total population of 1,373 people (730 male and 643 female), in 200 households and 188 physical houses. The area of the village was given as 980 acres and it had a post office at that point.

== Infrastructure ==
As of 2011, Salempur had 1 primary school and 1 primary health centre. Drinking water was provided by hand pump; there were no public toilets. The village did not have a post office or public library; there was at least some access to electricity for all purposes. Streets were made of both kachcha and pakka materials.
