= Siraulia =

Village in Uttar Pradesh, India

- Village
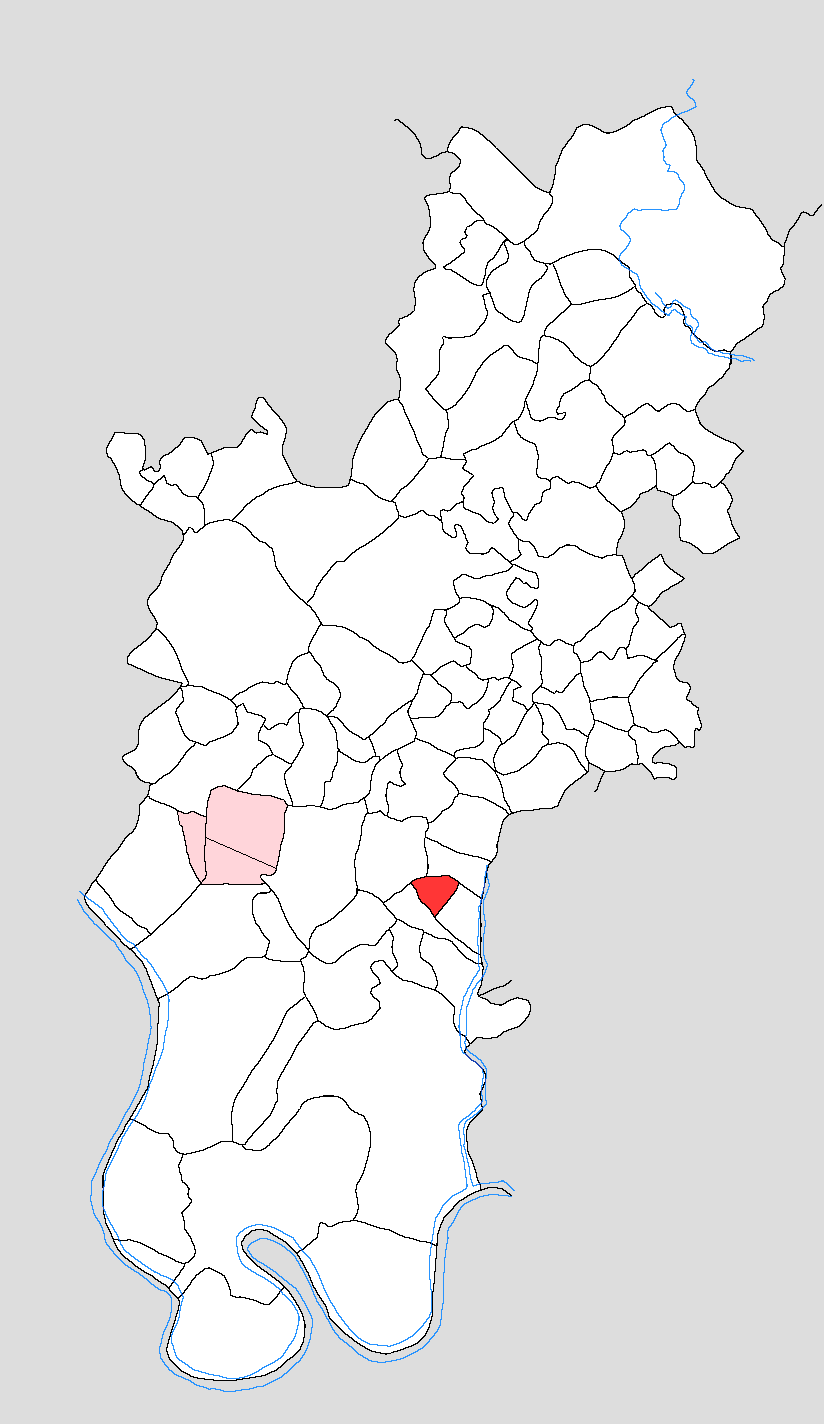
- Map showing Siraulia in Tundla block

- Location in Uttar Pradesh, India
- Coordinates: 27.19677°N 78.29146°E
- Country: India
- State: Uttar Pradesh
- District: Firozabad
- Tehsil: Tundla

Area
  - Total: 0.848 km^{2} (0.327 sq mi)

Population (2011)
  - Total: 1,421
  - Density: 1,680/km^{2} (4,340/sq mi)
- Time zone: UTC+5:30 (IST)
- PIN: 283204

Siraulia (Sirauliyā) is a village in Tundla block of Firozabad district, Uttar Pradesh. As of 2011, it had a population of 1,421, in 235 households.

== Demographics ==
As of 2011, Siraulia had a population of 1,421, in 235 households. This population was 55.0% male (781) and 45.0% female (640). The 0-6 age group numbered 236 (134 male and 102 female), making up 16.6% of the total population. 138 residents were members of Scheduled Castes, or 9.7% of the total.

The 1981 census recorded Siraulia as having a population of 776 people (417 male and 359 female), in 124 households and 124 physical houses.

The 1961 census recorded Siraulia (as "Sirolia") as comprising 1 hamlet, with a total population of 535 people (285 male and 250 female), in 86 households and 56 physical houses. The area of the village was given as 210 acres.

== Infrastructure ==
As of 2011, Siraulia had 1 primary school; it did not have any healthcare facilities. Drinking water was provided by tap, hand pump, and tube well/borehole; there were no public toilets. The village did not have a post office or public library; there was at least some access to electricity for all purposes. Streets were made of both kachcha and pakka materials.
