= Garhi Ummed =

Village in Uttar Pradesh, India

- Village
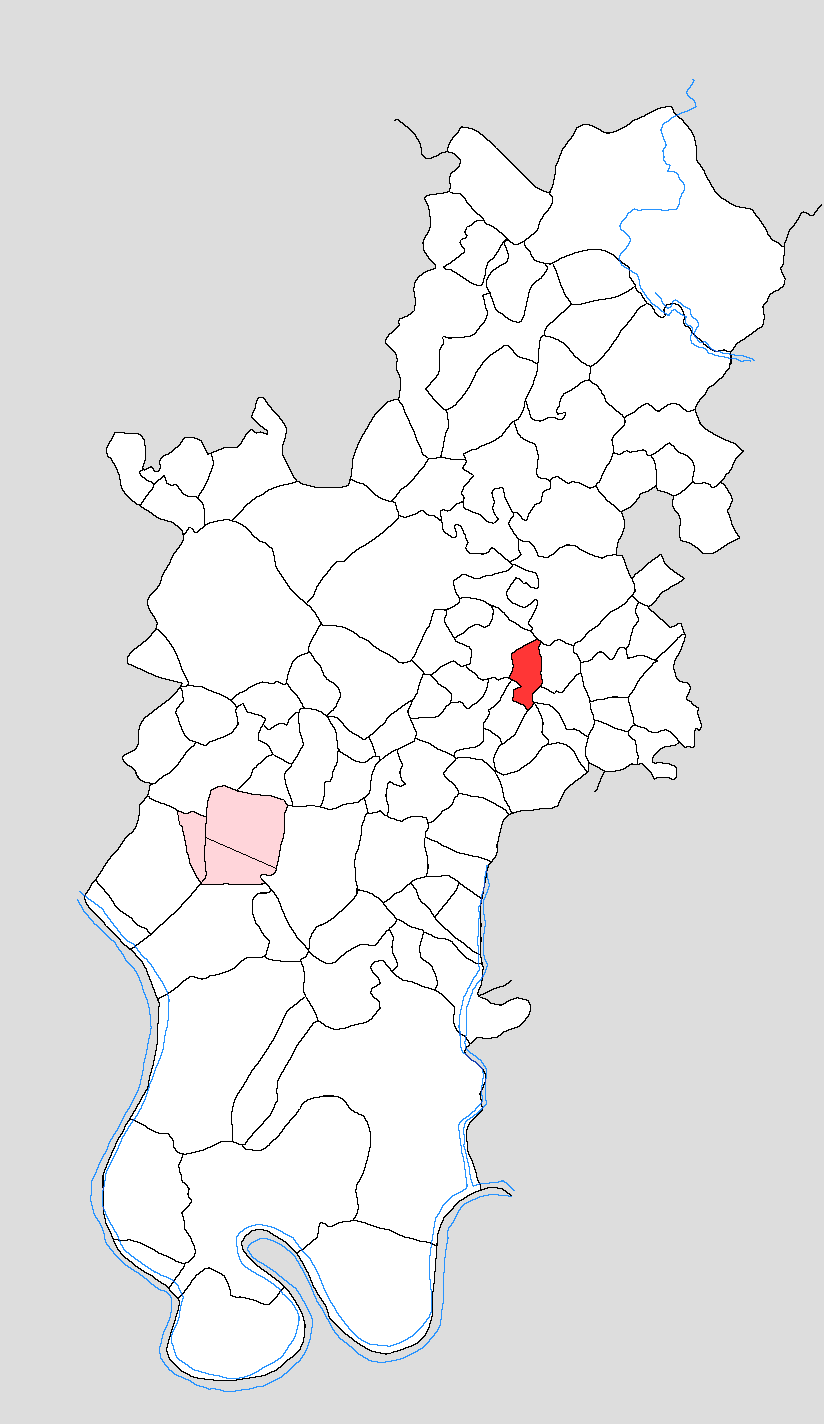
- Map showing Garhi Ummed in Tundla block

- Location in Uttar Pradesh, India
- Coordinates: 27.25398°N 78.31797°E
- Country: India
- State: Uttar Pradesh
- District: Firozabad
- Tehsil: Tundla

Area
  - Total: 1.12 km^{2} (0.43 sq mi)

Population (2011)
  - Total: 302
  - Density: 270/km^{2} (698/sq mi)
- Time zone: UTC+5:30 (IST)
- PIN: 283203

Garhi Ummed (Gaṛhī Ummed) is a village in Tundla block of Firozabad district, Uttar Pradesh. As of 2011, it has a population of 302, in 48 households.

== Demographics ==
As of 2011, Garhi Ummed had a population of 302, in 48 households. This population was 57.0% male (172) and 43.0% female (130). The 0-6 age group numbered 30 (19 male and 11 female), making up 9.9% of the total population. 97 residents were members of Scheduled Castes, or 32.1% of the total.

The 1981 census recorded Garhi Ummed as having a population of 237 people (123 male and 114 female), in 29 households and 29 physical houses.

The 1961 census recorded Garhi Ummed (as "Garhi Umed") as comprising 1 hamlet, with a total population of 170 people (88 male and 82 female), in 21 households and 15 physical houses. The area of the village was given as 280 acres.

== Infrastructure ==
As of 2011, Garhi Ummed had 1 primary school; it did not have any healthcare facilities. Drinking water was provided by hand pump and tube well/borehole; there were no public toilets. The village did not have a post office or public library; there was at least some access to electricity for all purposes. Streets were made of both kachcha and pakka materials.
