= Bhainsa Brijpur =

Village in Uttar Pradesh, India

- Village
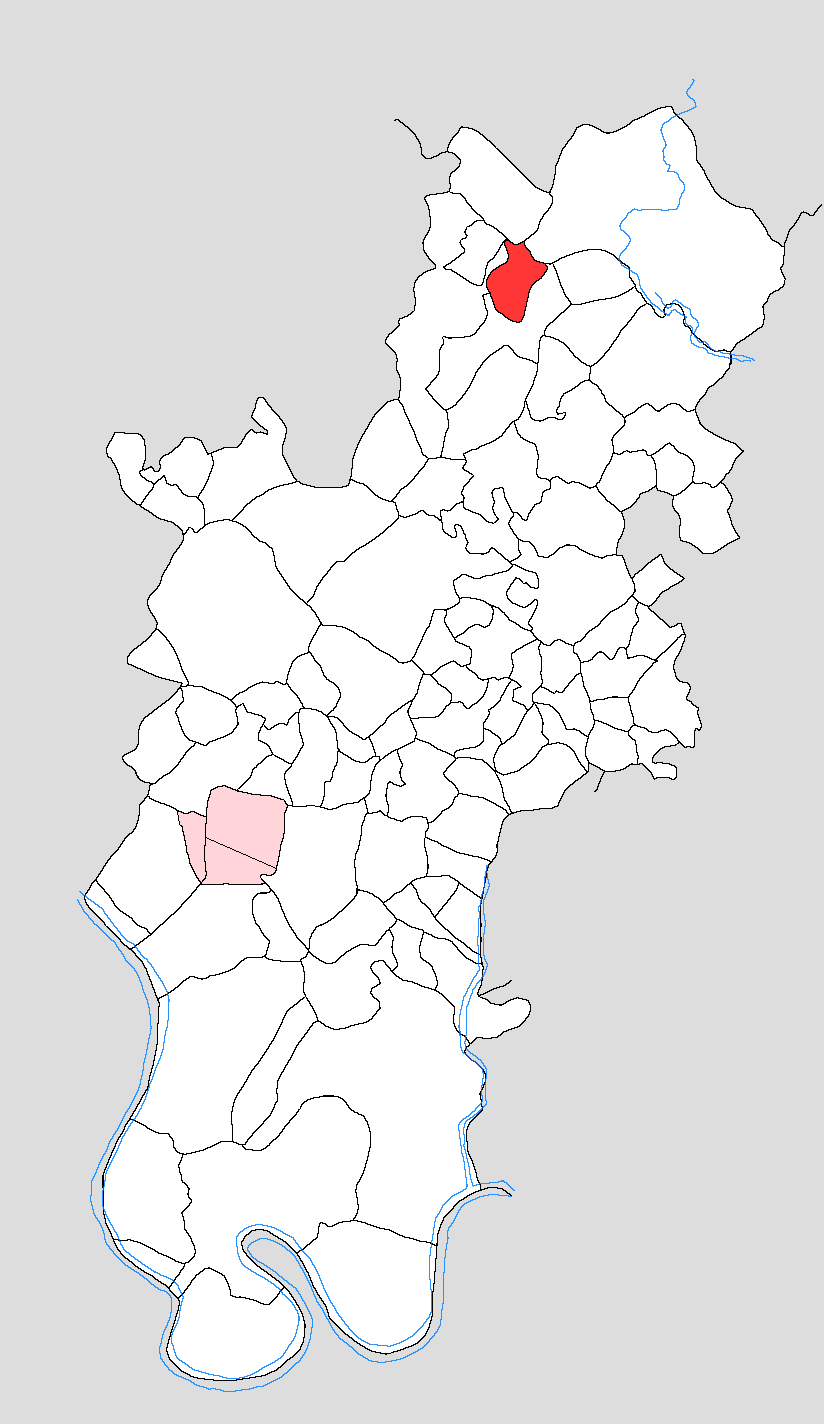
- Map showing Bhainsa Brijpur in Tundla block

- Location in Uttar Pradesh, India
- Coordinates: 27.35066°N 78.31237°E
- Country: India
- State: Uttar Pradesh
- District: Firozabad
- Tehsil: Tundla

Area
  - Total: 2.548 km^{2} (0.984 sq mi)

Population (2011)
  - Total: 1,317
  - Density: 516.9/km^{2} (1,339/sq mi)
- Time zone: UTC+5:30 (IST)
- PIN: 207302

Bhainsa Brijpur (Bhainsā Brajpur) is a village in Tundla block of Firozabad district, Uttar Pradesh. It was formerly part of Etah district. As of 2011, it has a population of 1,317, in 227 households.

== Demographics ==
As of 2011, Bhainsa Brijpur had a population of 1,317, in 227 households. This population was 54.7% male (720) and 45.3% female (597). The 0-6 age group numbered 232 (122 male and 110 female), making up 17.6% of the total population. 126 residents were members of Scheduled Castes, or 9.6% of the total.

The 1981 census recorded Bhainsa Brijpur as having a population of 880 people (506 male and 374 female), in 219 households and 215 physical houses. It was then counted as part of Jalesar block and tehsil in Etah district.

The 1961 census recorded Bhainsa Brijpur (as "Bhaisa Brijpur") as comprising 2 hamlets, with a total population of 579 people (320 male and 259 female), in 100 households and 78 physical houses. The area of the village was given as 626 acres. It was then counted as part of Jalesar block and tehsil in Etah district.

== Infrastructure ==
As of 2011, Bhainsa Brijpur had 1 primary school; it did not have any healthcare facilities. Drinking water was provided by hand pump; there were no public toilets. The village did not have a post office or public library; there was at least some access to electricity for all purposes. Streets were made of both kachcha and pakka materials.
