= Shekhupur Rajmal =

Village in Uttar Pradesh, India

- Village
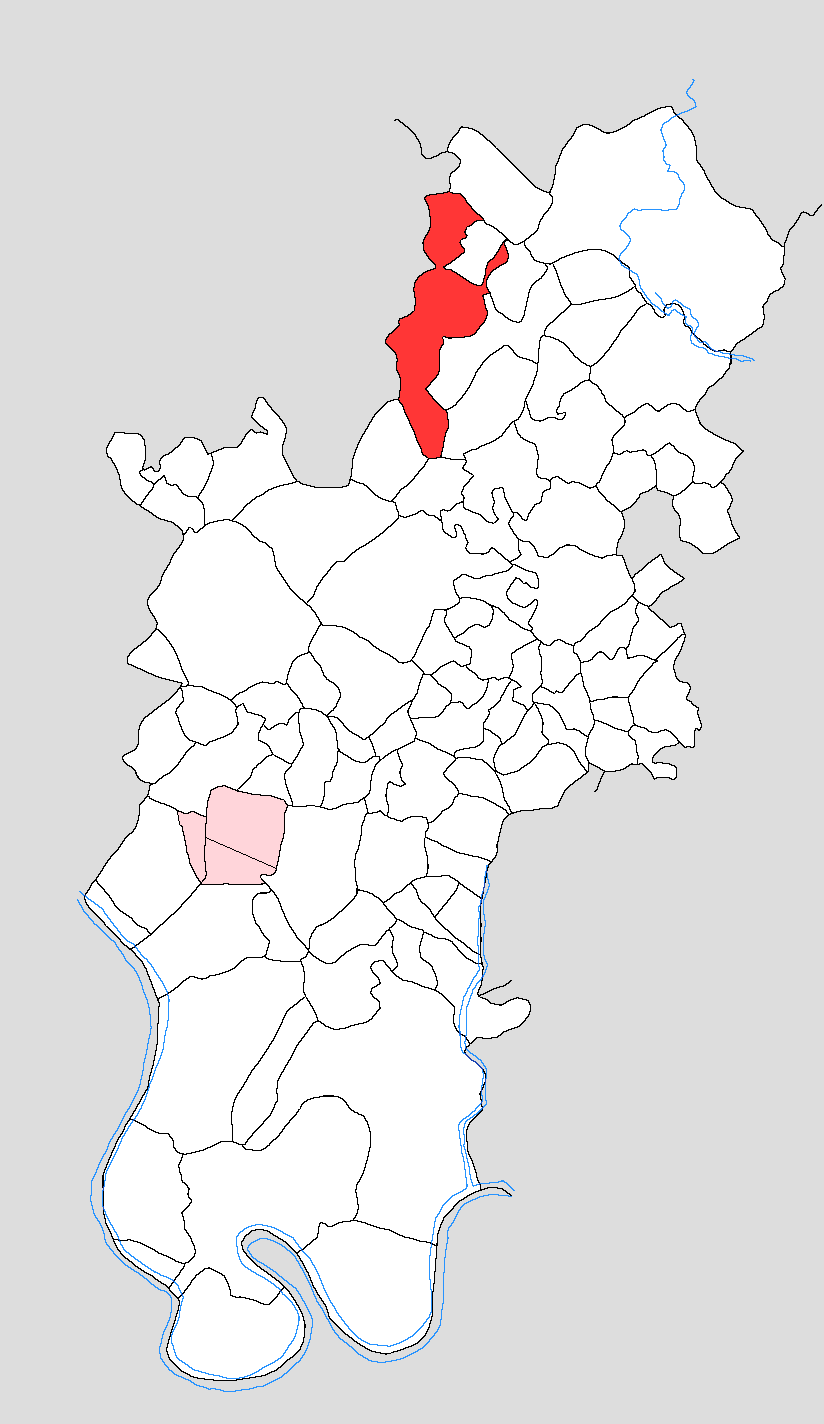
- Map showing Shekhupur Rajmal in Tundla block

- Location in Uttar Pradesh, India
- Coordinates: 27.3445844°N 78.2856013°E
- Country: India
- State: Uttar Pradesh
- District: Firozabad
- Tehsil: Tundla

Area
  - Total: 9.502 km^{2} (3.669 sq mi)

Population (2011)
  - Total: 6,395
  - Density: 673.0/km^{2} (1,743/sq mi)
- Time zone: UTC+5:30 (IST)
- PIN: 207302

Shekhupur Rajmal (Śekhūpur Rājmal) is a village in Tundla block of Firozabad district, Uttar Pradesh. It was formerly part of Etah district. As of 2011, it has a population of 6,395, in 1,067 households.

== Demographics ==
As of 2011, Shekhupur Rajmal had a population of 6,395, in 1,067 households. This population was 54.1% male (3,457) and 45.9% female (2,938). The 0-6 age group numbered 1,036 (542 male and 494 female), making up 16.2% of the total population. 1,257 residents were members of Scheduled Castes, or 19.7% of the total.

The 1981 census recorded Shekhupur Rajmal as having a population of 3,793 people (2,065 male and 1,728 female), in 680 households and 664 physical houses. It was then counted as part of Jalesar block and tehsil in Etah district.

The 1961 census recorded Shekhupur Rajmal (as "Sheikhupur Rajmal") as comprising 8 hamlets, with a total population of 2,657 people (1,482 male and 1,175 female), in 486 households and 404 physical houses. The area of the village was given as 2,379 acres and it had a post office and medical practitioner at that point. It was then counted as part of Jalesar block and tehsil in Etah district.

== Infrastructure ==
As of 2011, Shekhupur Rajmal had 2 primary schools; it did not have any healthcare facilities. Drinking water was provided by hand pump; there were no public toilets. The village had a sub post office but no public library; there was at least some access to electricity for all purposes. Streets were made of both kachcha and pakka materials.
