= Ramgarh urf Ummergarh =

Village in Uttar Pradesh, India

- Village
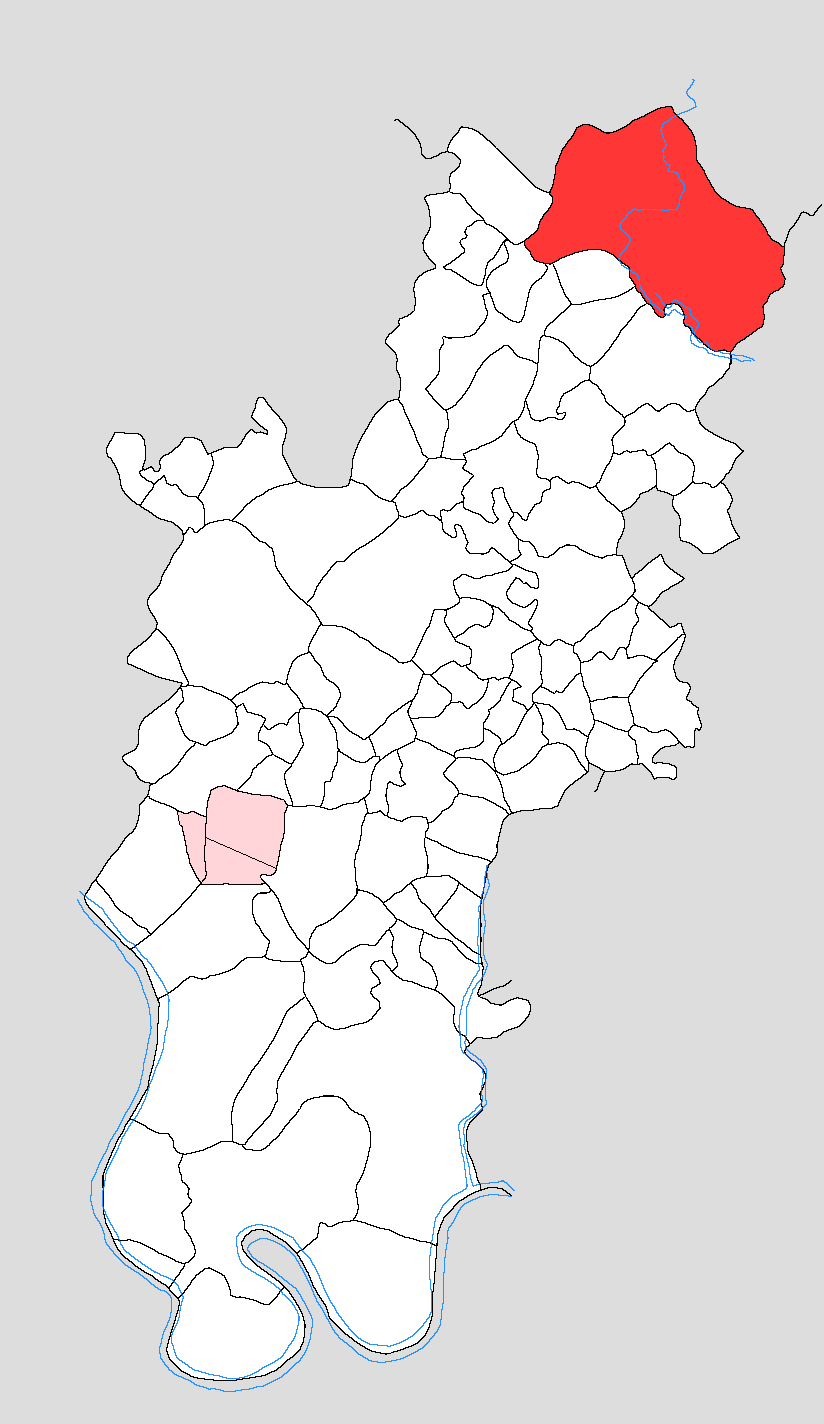
- Map showing Ramgarh urf Ummergarh in Tundla block

- Location in Uttar Pradesh, India
- Coordinates: 27.3725941°N 78.3319929°E
- Country: India
- State: Uttar Pradesh
- District: Firozabad
- Tehsil: Tundla

Area
  - Total: 26.248 km^{2} (10.134 sq mi)

Population (2011)
  - Total: 14,944
  - Density: 569.34/km^{2} (1,474.6/sq mi)
- Time zone: UTC+5:30 (IST)
- PIN: 207302

Ramgarh urf Ummergarh (Rāmgaṛh urf Ummergaṛh) is a village in Tundla block of Firozabad district, Uttar Pradesh. The urf in the name means "also known as". It was formerly part of Etah district. As of 2011, it has a population of 14,944, in 2,615 households.

== Demographics ==
As of 2011, Ramgarh urf Ummergarh had a population of 14,944, in 2,615 households. This population was 53.5% male (7,999) and 46.5% female (6,945). The 0-6 age group numbered 2,460 (1,275 male and 1,185 female), making up 16.5% of the total population. 5,140 residents were members of Scheduled Castes, or 34.4% of the total.

The 1981 census recorded Ramgarh urf Ummergarh (as "Amargarh urf Ummargarh") as having a population of 8,289 people (4,666 male and 3,623 female), in 1,491 households and 1,459 physical houses. It was then counted as part of Jalesar block and tehsil in Etah district.

The 1961 census recorded Ramgarh urf Ummergarh as comprising 19 hamlets, with a total population of 4,991 people (2,694 male and 2,297 female), in 978 households and 864 physical houses. The area of the village was given as 6,534 acres and it had a post office and medical practitioner at that point. It was then counted as part of Jalesar block and tehsil in Etah district.

== Infrastructure ==
As of 2011, Ramgarh urf Ummergarh had 4 primary schools; it did not have any healthcare facilities. Drinking water was provided by tap and hand pump; there were no public toilets. The village had a sub post office but no public library; there was at least some access to electricity for all purposes. Streets were made of both kachcha and pakka materials.
