= Gothua =

Village in Uttar Pradesh, India

- Village
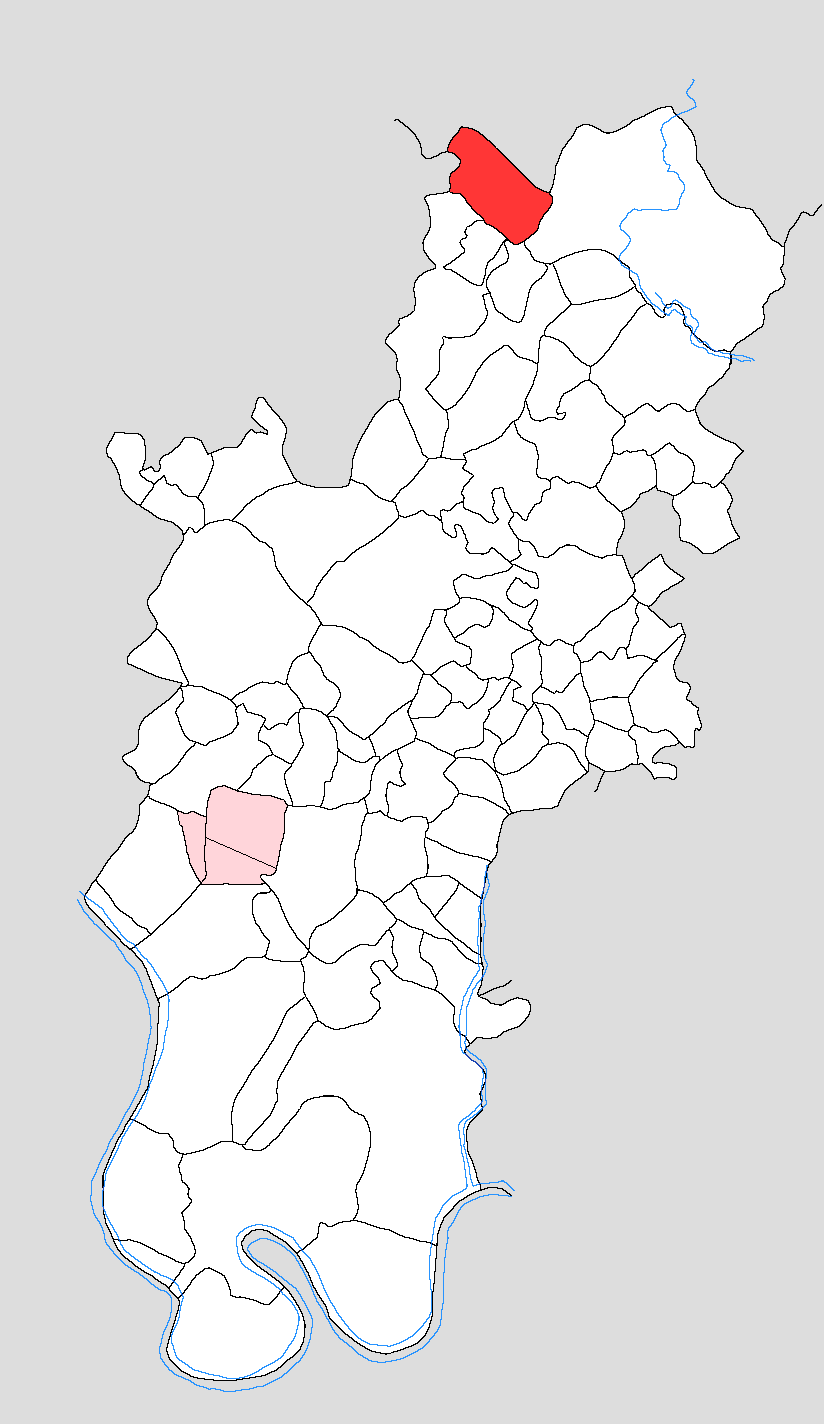
- Map showing Gothua in Tundla block

- Location in Uttar Pradesh, India
- Coordinates: 27.3819°N 78.30163°E
- Country: India
- State: Uttar Pradesh
- District: Firozabad
- Tehsil: Tundla

Area
  - Total: 4.703 km^{2} (1.816 sq mi)

Population (2011)
  - Total: 2,758
  - Density: 586.4/km^{2} (1,519/sq mi)
- Time zone: UTC+5:30 (IST)
- PIN: 207302

Gothua (Gothuā) is a village in Tundla block of Firozabad district, Uttar Pradesh. It was formerly part of Etah district. As of 2011, it has a population of 2,758, in 460 households.

== Demographics ==
As of 2011, Gothua had a population of 2,758, in 460 households. This population was 53.6% male (1,478) and 46.4% female (1,280). The 0-6 age group numbered 433 (230 male and 203 female), making up 15.7% of the total population. 774 residents were members of Scheduled Castes, or 28.1% of the total.

The 1981 census recorded Gothua as having a population of 1,577 people (897 male and 680 female), in 311 households and 287 physical houses. It was then counted as part of Jalesar block and tehsil in Etah district.

The 1961 census recorded Gothua (as "Gothoa") as comprising 2 hamlets, with a total population of 1,190 people (643 male and 547 female), in 229 households and 193 physical houses. The area of the village was given as 1,199. It was then counted as part of Jalesar block and tehsil in Etah district.

== Infrastructure ==
As of 2011, Gothua had 1 primary school; it did not have any healthcare facilities. Drinking water was provided by tap and hand pump; there were no public toilets. The village did not have a post office or public library; there was at least some access to electricity for all purposes. Streets were made of both kachcha and pakka materials.
