= Rampur, Tundla =

Rampur, Tundla may refer to:

- Rampur, Tundla (census code 125462)
- Rampur, Tundla (census code 125497)
