= Paharipur Bhondela =

Village in Uttar Pradesh, India

- Village
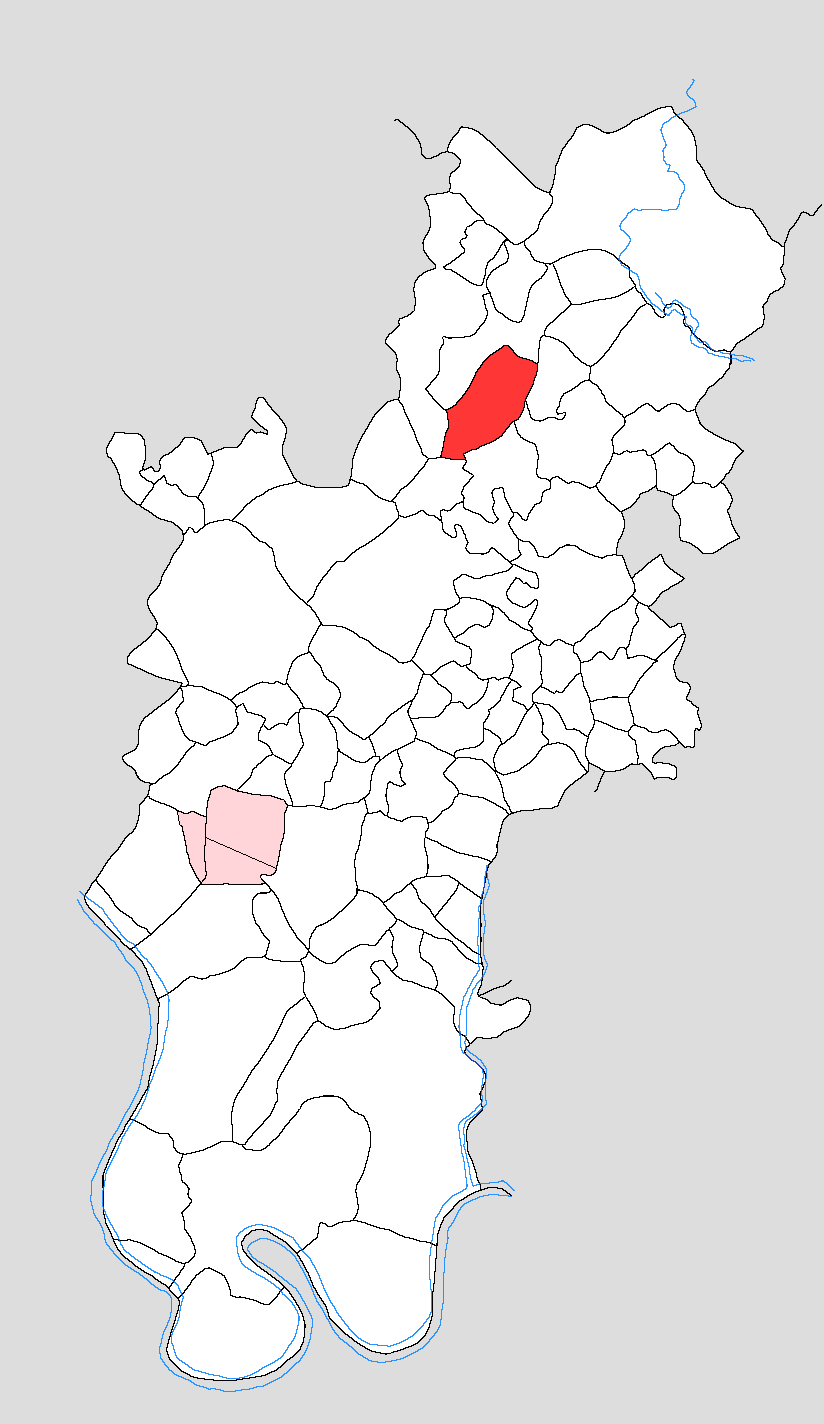
- Map showing Paharipur Bhondela in Tundla block

- Location in Uttar Pradesh, India
- Coordinates: 27.3224402°N 78.2973318°E
- Country: India
- State: Uttar Pradesh
- District: Firozabad
- Tehsil: Tundla

Area
  - Total: 4.545 km^{2} (1.755 sq mi)

Population (2011)
  - Total: 3,080
  - Density: 678/km^{2} (1,760/sq mi)
- Time zone: UTC+5:30 (IST)
- PIN: 207302

Paharipur Bhondela (Pahāṛīpur Bhoṇḍelā) is a village in Tundla block of Firozabad district, Uttar Pradesh. It was formerly part of Etah district. As of 2011, it has a population of 3,080, in 476 households.

== Demographics ==
As of 2011, Paharipur Bhondela had a population of 3,080, in 476 households. This population was 53.6% male (1,652) and 46.4% female (1,428). The 0-6 age group numbered 500 (276 male and 224 female), making up 16.2% of the total population. 912 residents were members of Scheduled Castes, or 29.6% of the total.

The 1981 census recorded Paharipur Bhondela as having a population of 2,005 people (1,093 male and 912 female), in 351 households and 345 physical houses. It was then counted as part of Jalesar block and tehsil in Etah district.

The 1961 census recorded Paharipur Bhondela as comprising 4 hamlets, with a total population of 1,430 people (750 male and 680 female), in 253 households and 205 physical houses. The area of the village was given as 1,135 acres and it had a medical practitioner at that point. It was then counted as part of Jalesar block and tehsil in Etah district.

== Infrastructure ==
As of 2011, Paharipur Bhondela had 1 primary school and 1 primary health sub centre. Drinking water was provided by tap and hand pump; there were no public toilets. The village did not have a post office or public library; there was at least some access to electricity for all purposes. Streets were made of both kachcha and pakka materials.
