= Baghai, Firozabad =

Baghai, Firozabad may refer to the following villages in Uttar Pradesh, India:

- Baghai, Firozabad (census code 125443)
- Baghai, Firozabad (census code 125495)
