= Shekhupur Mandanpur =

Village in Uttar Pradesh, India

- Village
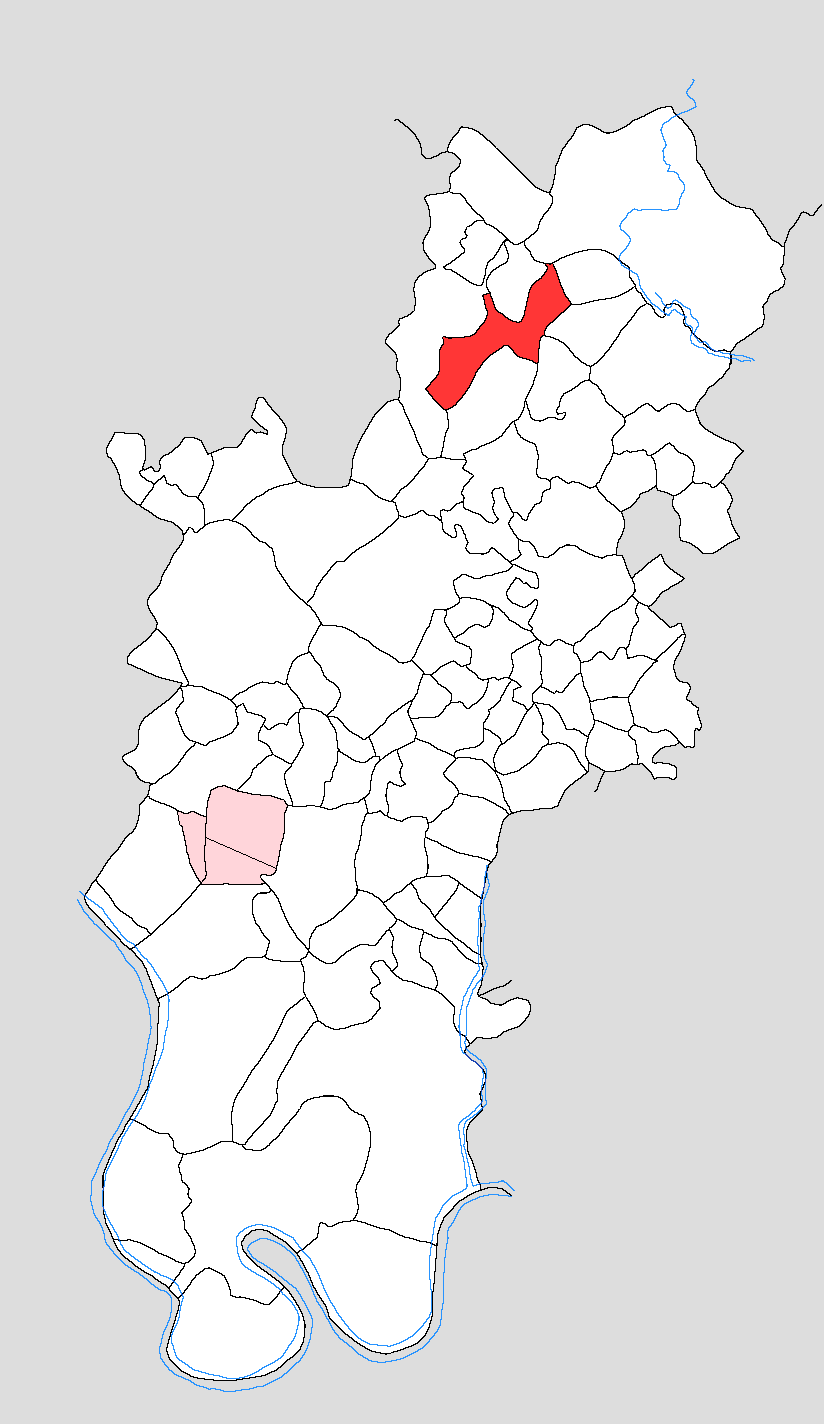
- Map showing Shekhupur Mandanpur in Tundla block

- Location in Uttar Pradesh, India
- Coordinates: 27.336737°N 78.2960411°E
- Country: India
- State: Uttar Pradesh
- District: Firozabad
- Tehsil: Tundla

Area
  - Total: 4.975 km^{2} (1.921 sq mi)

Population (2011)
  - Total: 3,286
  - Density: 660.5/km^{2} (1,711/sq mi)
- Time zone: UTC+5:30 (IST)
- PIN: 207302

Shekhupur Mandanpur (Śekhūpur Maṇḍanpur) is a village in Tundla block of Firozabad district, Uttar Pradesh. It was formerly part of Etah district. As of 2011, it has a population of 3,286, in 515 households.

== Demographics ==
As of 2011, Shekhupur Mandanpur had a population of 3,286, in 515 households. This population was 53.8% male (1,767) and 46.2% female (1,519). The 0-6 age group numbered 461 (230 male and 231 female), making up 14.0% of the total population. 864 residents were members of Scheduled Castes, or 26.3% of the total.

The 1981 census recorded Shekhupur Mandanpur (as "Shekhupur Madanpur") as having a population of 1,846 people (1,036 male and 810 female), in 332 households and 314 physical houses. It was then counted as part of Jalesar block and tehsil in Etah district.

The 1961 census recorded Shekhupur Mandanpur (as "Sheikhupur Mandanpur") as comprising 5 hamlets, with a total population of 1,356 people (760 male and 596 female), in 208 households and 192 physical houses. The area of the village was given as 1,249 acres. It was then counted as part of Jalesar block and tehsil in Etah district.

== Infrastructure ==
As of 2011, Shekhupur Mandanpur had 1 primary school; it did not have any healthcare facilities. Drinking water was provided by hand pump; there were no public toilets. The village did had a post and telegraph office but no public library; there was at least some access to electricity for all purposes. Streets were made of both kachcha and pakka materials.
