= Rampur, Tundla (census code 125497) =

Village in Uttar Pradesh, India

Rampur
- Village
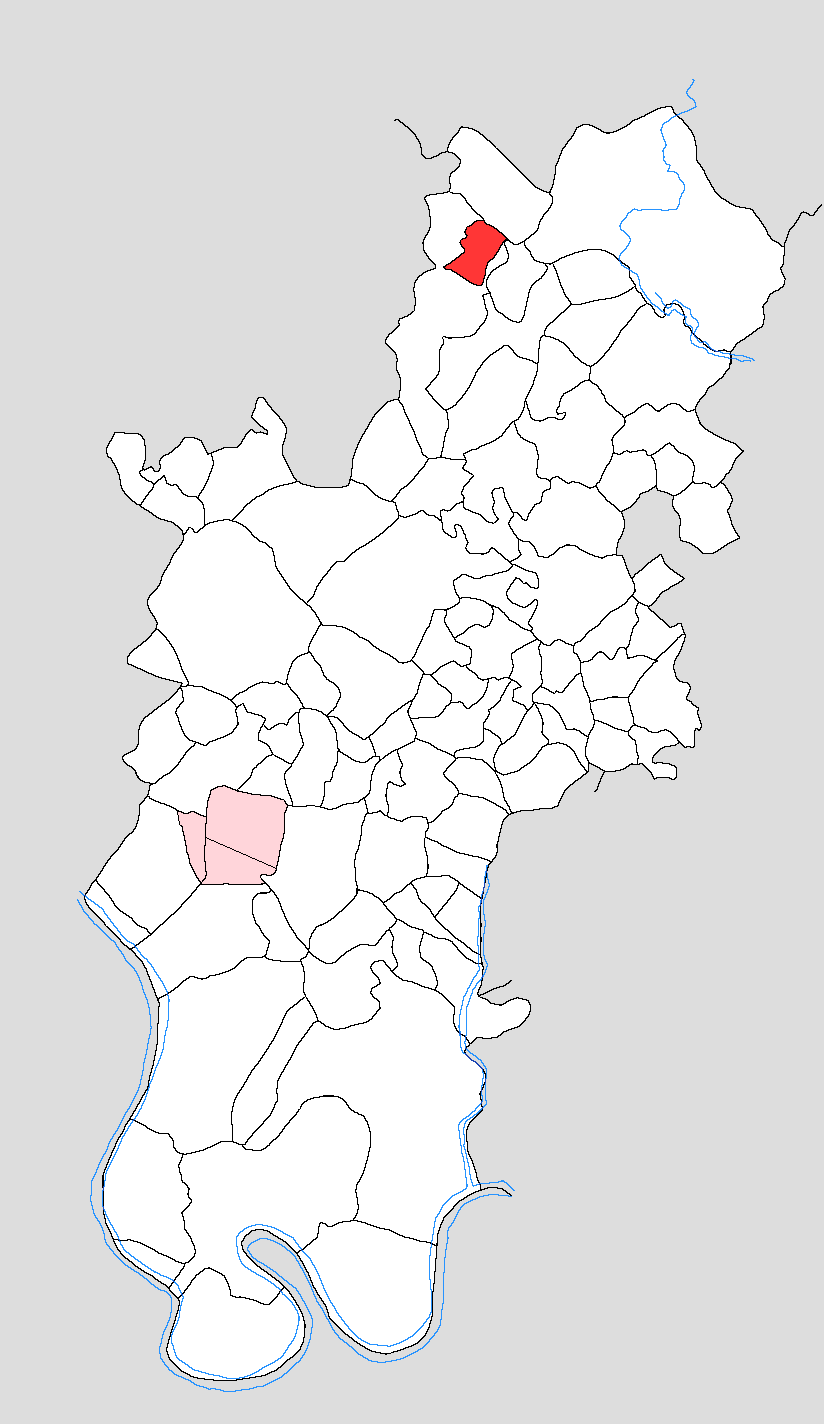
- Map showing Rampur in Tundla block

- Location in Uttar Pradesh, India
- Coordinates: 27.35668°N 78.29752°E
- Country: India
- State: Uttar Pradesh
- District: Firozabad
- Tehsil: Tundla

Area
  - Total: 1.554 km^{2} (0.600 sq mi)

Population (2011)
  - Total: 495
  - Density: 319/km^{2} (825/sq mi)
- Time zone: UTC+5:30 (IST)
- PIN: 207302

Rampur (Rāmpur) is a village in Tundla block of Firozabad district, Uttar Pradesh. It was formerly part of Etah district. As of 2011, it has a population of 495, in 80 households.

== Demographics ==
As of 2011, Rampur had a population of 495, in 80 households. This population was 53.1% male (263) and 46.9% female (232). The 0-6 age group numbered 85 (47 male and 38 female), making up 17.2% of the total population. 78 residents were members of Scheduled Castes, or 15.8% of the total.

The 1981 census recorded Rampur as having a population of 287 people (160 male and 127 female), in 55 households and 54 physical houses. It was then counted as part of Jalesar block and tehsil in Etah district.

The 1961 census recorded Rampur as comprising 1 hamlet, with a total population of 216 people (112 male and 104 female), in 38 households and 37 physical houses. The area of the village was given as 391 acres. It was then counted as part of Jalesar block and tehsil in Etah district.

== Infrastructure ==
As of 2011, Rampur had 1 primary school; it did not have any healthcare facilities. Drinking water was provided by hand pump; there were no public toilets. The village did not have a post office or public library; there was at least some access to electricity for agricultural and commercial (but not residential) purposes. Streets were made of both kachcha and pakka materials.

== See also ==
- Rampur, Tundla (census code 125462), another village in Firozabad district with the same name
