= Baghai, Firozabad (census code 125495) =

Village in Uttar Pradesh, India

Baghai
- Village
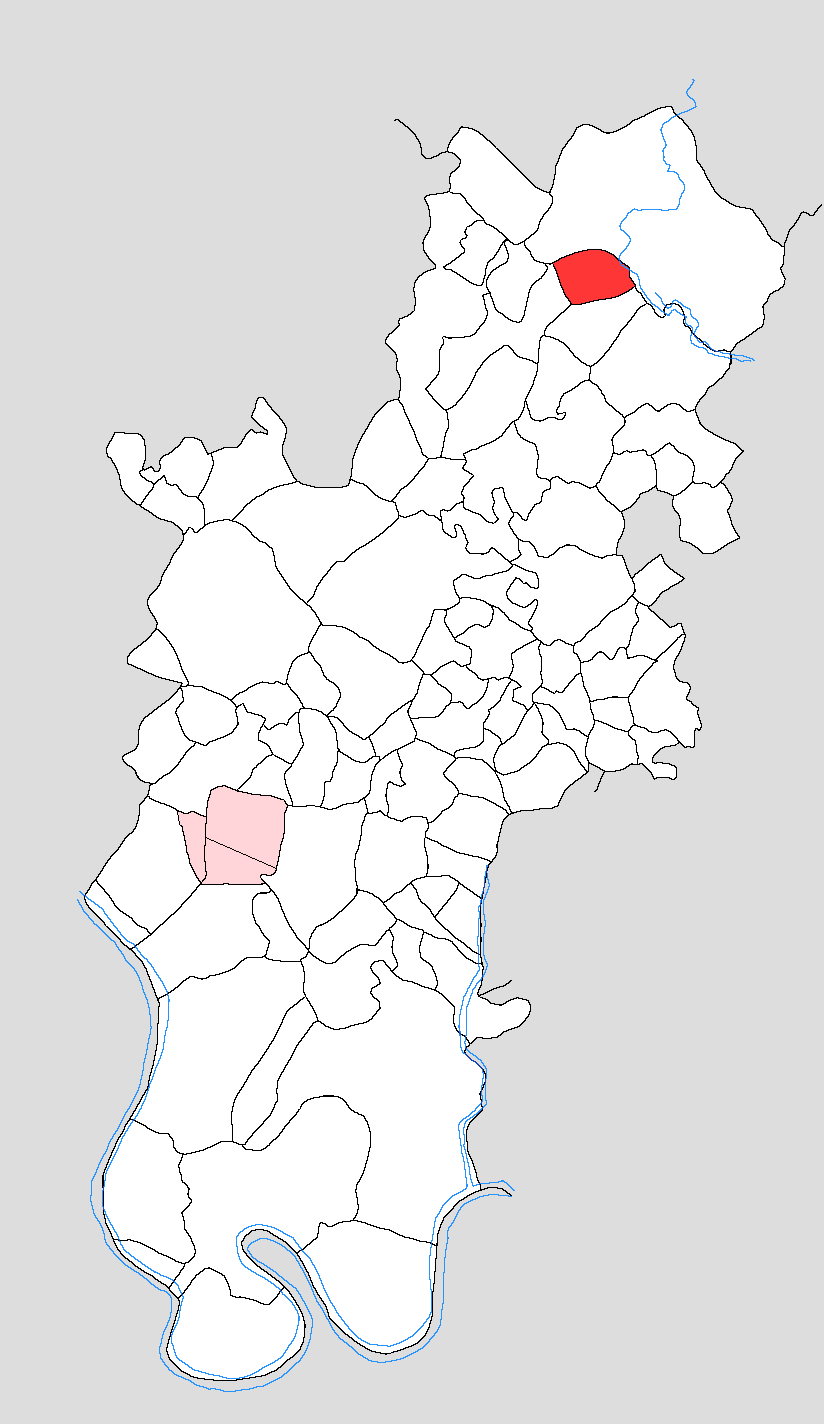
- Map showing Baghai in Tundla block

- Location in Uttar Pradesh, India
- Coordinates: 27.3538°N 78.33323°E
- Country: India
- State: Uttar Pradesh
- District: Firozabad
- Tehsil: Tundla

Area
  - Total: 2.636 km^{2} (1.018 sq mi)

Population (2011)
  - Total: 846
  - Density: 321/km^{2} (831/sq mi)
- Time zone: UTC+5:30 (IST)
- PIN: 207302

Baghai (Bāghaī) is a village in Tundla block of Firozabad district, Uttar Pradesh. It was formerly part of Etah district. As of 2011, it has a population of 846, in 157 households.

== Demographics ==
As of 2011, Baghai had a population of 846, in 157 households. This population was 55.6% male (470) and 44.4% female (376). The 0-6 age group numbered 122 (68 male and 54 female), making up 14.4% of the total population. 253 residents were members of Scheduled Castes, or 29.9% of the total.

The 1981 census recorded Baghai as having a population of 614 people (331 male and 283 female), in 113 households and 106 physical houses. It was then counted as part of Jalesar block and tehsil in Etah district.

The 1961 census recorded Baghai as comprising 1 hamlet, with a total population of 559 people (280 male and 279 female), in 112 households and 90 physical houses. The area of the village was given as 656 acres. It was then counted as part of Jalesar block and tehsil in Etah district.

== Infrastructure ==
As of 2011, Baghai had 1 primary school; it did not have any healthcare facilities. Drinking water was provided by hand pump; there were no public toilets. The village did not have a post office or public library; there was at least some access to electricity for residential and agricultural (but not commercial) purposes. Streets were made of both kachcha and pakka materials.

== See also ==
- Baghai, Firozabad (census code 125443), another village in the district with the same name
