= Rampur, Tundla (census code 125462) =

Village in Uttar Pradesh, India

Rampur
- Village
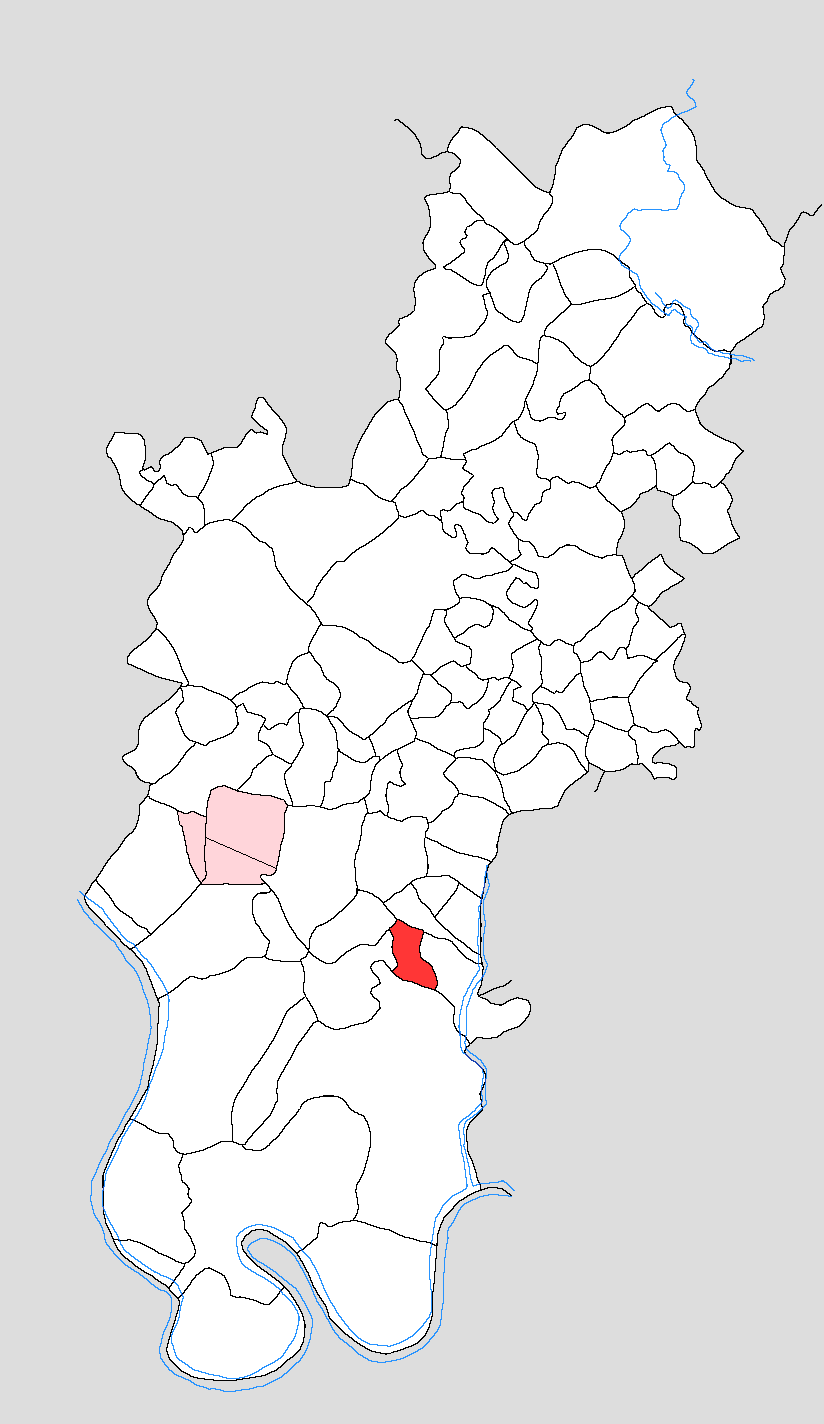
- Map showing Rampur in Tundla block

- Location in Uttar Pradesh, India
- Coordinates: 27.17813°N 78.28421°E
- Country: India
- State: Uttar Pradesh
- District: Firozabad
- Tehsil: Tundla

Area
  - Total: 1.691 km^{2} (0.653 sq mi)

Population (2011)
  - Total: 907
  - Density: 536/km^{2} (1,390/sq mi)
- Time zone: UTC+5:30 (IST)
- PIN: 283204

Rampur (Rāmpur) is a village in Tundla block of Firozabad district, Uttar Pradesh. As of 2011, it has a population of 907, in 138 households.

== Demographics ==
As of 2011, Rampur had a population of 907, in 138 households. This population was 52.8% male (479) and 47.2% female (428). The 0-6 age group numbered 197 (103 male and 94 female), making up 21.7% of the total population. 267 residents were members of Scheduled Castes, or 29.4% of the total.

The 1981 census recorded Rampur as having a population of 611 people (351 male and 260 female), in 103 households and 102 physical houses.

The 1961 census recorded Rampur as comprising 1 hamlet, with a total population of 502 people (284 male and 218 female), in 94 households and 67 physical houses. The area of the village was given as 337 acres.

== Infrastructure ==
As of 2011, Rampur had 1 primary school; it did not have any healthcare facilities. Drinking water was provided by tap, hand pump, and tube well/borehole; there were no public toilets. The village did not have a post office or public library; there was at least some access to electricity for all purposes. Streets were made of both kachcha and pakka materials.

== See also ==
- Rampur, Tundla (census code 125497), another village with the same name in Tundla tehsil
