= Baghai, Firozabad (census code 125443) =

Village in Uttar Pradesh, India

Baghai
- Village
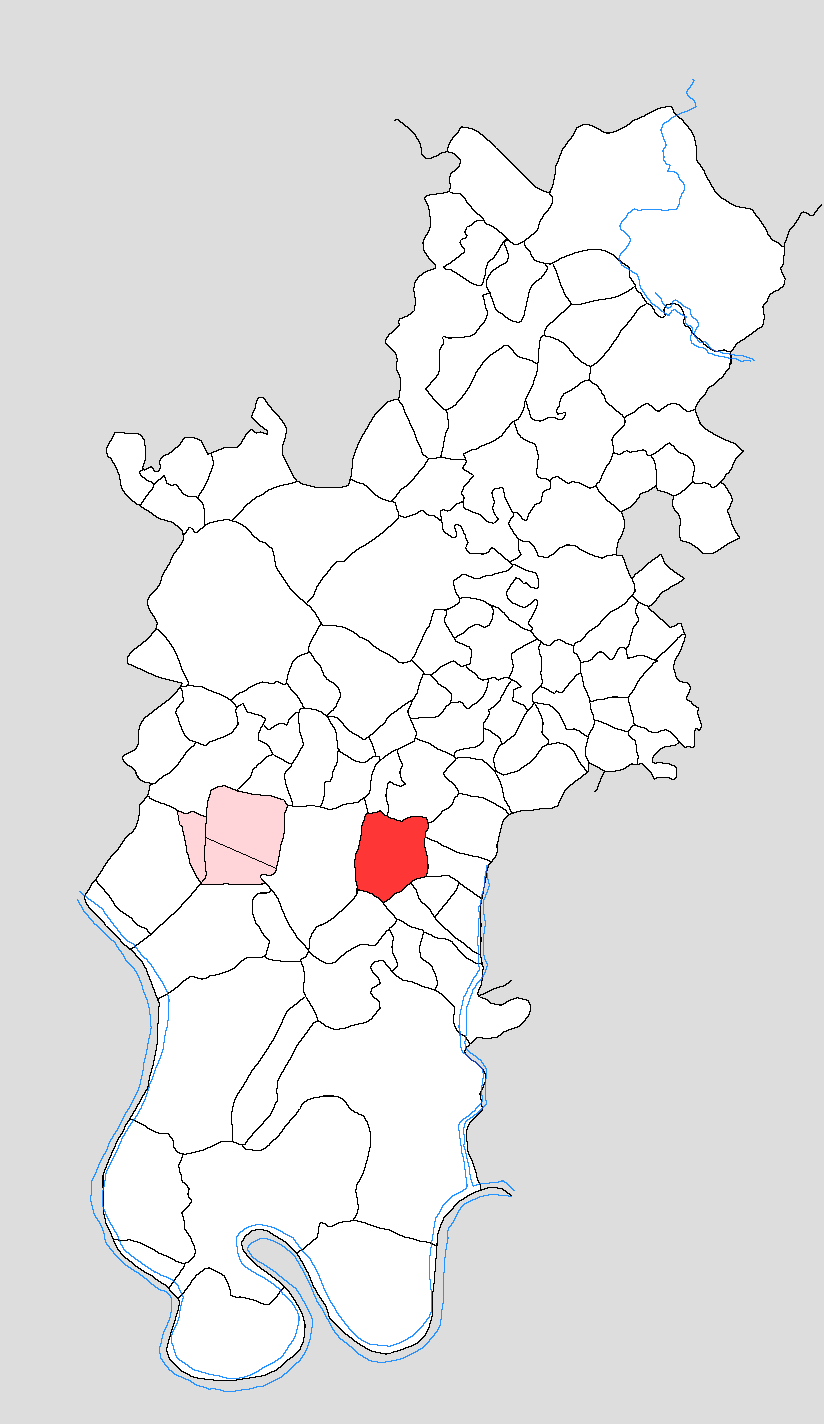
- Map showing Baghai in Tundla block

- Location in Uttar Pradesh, India
- Coordinates: 27.20366°N 78.2805°E
- Country: India
- State: Uttar Pradesh
- District: Firozabad
- Tehsil: Tundla

Area
  - Total: 3.888 km^{2} (1.501 sq mi)

Population (2011)
  - Total: 2,483
  - Density: 638.6/km^{2} (1,654/sq mi)
- Time zone: UTC+5:30 (IST)
- PIN: 283103

Baghai (Bāghaī) is a village in Tundla block of Firozabad district, Uttar Pradesh, India. As of 2011, it had a population of 2,483, in 411 households.

== Demographics ==
As of 2011, Baghai had a population of 2,483, in 411 households. This population was 53.9% male (1,339) and 46.1% female (1,144). The 0-6 age group numbered 421 (228 male and 193 female), making up 17.0% of the total population. 1,482 residents were members of Scheduled Castes, or 59.7% of the total.

The 1981 census recorded Baghai as having a population of 1,413 people (777 male and 636 female), in 249 households and 248 physical houses.

The 1961 census recorded Baghai as comprising 3 hamlets, with a total population of 1,073 people (581 male and 492 female), in 170 households and 116 physical houses. The area of the village was given as 961 acres and it had a post office at that point.

== Infrastructure ==
As of 2011, Baghai had 1 primary school; it did not have any healthcare facilities. Drinking water was provided by hand pump and tube well/borehole; there was at least one public toilet. The village had a sub post office but no public library; there was at least some access to electricity for all purposes. Streets were made of pakka materials.

== See also ==
- Baghai, Firozabad (census code 125495), another village in Firozabad district with the same name
