= Jalesar =

- Town
- Location in Uttar Pradesh, India
- Coordinates: 27.48°N 78.32°E
- Town: India
- State: Uttar Pradesh
- District: Etah
- Founder: Jarasindh

Government
  - Type: Nagar Palika
  - Body: Nagar Paika

Area
  - Total: 5 km^{2} (1.9 sq mi)

Population (2017)
  - Total: 58,086
  - Density: 12,000/km^{2} (30,000/sq mi)

Languages
  - Official: Hindi
- Time zone: UTC+5:30 (IST)
- PIN: 207302
- Vehicle registration: UP-82

Jalesar is a Nagar Palika in Etah Sub District, Etah district in the Indian state of Uttar Pradesh. There is a fort of Awagarh near Jalesar, Awagarh is 15 kilometres (9.3 mi) from Jalesar It is connected by road to other towns such as Hathras, Etah, Aligarh, Firozabad and Agra.

Jalesar is located on National Highway 321G approximately 48 km (30 mi) from Agra. There is road connectivity from Agra, Tundla, Awagarh, Etah, Kasganj, Soron, Ujhani, Badaun, and Bareily. Rail Connectivity exists from Jalesar to Tundla, Etah. Recently a new line also added to connect Jalesar through Rail Network to Agra.

== History ==
Jalesar was listed in the Ain-i Akbari (c. 1595) as a mahal under sarkar Agra. It was listed with an assessed revenue of 6,835,400 dams and was expected to supply 5,000 infantry and 400 cavalry to the Mughal army.

== Demographics ==
Jalesar is a Nagar Palika Parishad in district of Etah, Uttar Pradesh. The Jalesar is divided into 25 wards for which elections are held every 5 years. The Jalesar has population of 38,130 of which 20,173 are males while 17,957 are females as per report released by Census of India 2011. Jalesar has total administration over 13,980 houses to which it supplies basic amenities like water and sewerage.

== Areas ==
Jalesar town has several markets. Main shoppings area are Maharana Pratap circle agra road, katra chungi, sherganj, Posti khana, Bara Bazar, Nala Bazar, Gandhi chowk, Mandi Jawahar Ganj, Mahaveer Ganj etc.

== Tourism ==
Patna Bird Sanctuary is approximately 5.5 km (3.4 mi) away on Sikandra Rao Road. In December and January, it becomes a residence of migrated birds from European and American zones. Jalesar is a town of brass and famous for its 'Pital Udhyog' which has never faded its shine. Jalesar is known for its cast Temple bells,

Famous Temples are Ram Mandir in Gali Boharan, Chintaharan Mandir & Laxmi Narayan Mandir near Govt. Hospital, Pathwari Mandir situated on road to Hathras Junction and Hanuman Mandir in Mahavir Ganj Other temples in the area are Bhairo Bagichi, Dwarkadheesh Mandir.

Famous Mosque Sunheri Masjid in Kila Road, Jama Masjid Nearby Kotwali Thana, Ek Minar Masjid in Bazar bisat Khana & Masjid Markaz in Memran.

Jalesar is famous for Saturday Jaat for which people from farther towns and villages visit to devote their respect. This has been custom for many years and being continued. Another attraction is Dargah Place which is located near old Basant Vatika and has been a place to Organize Urs Mela which is enjoyed by residents. Nearby Dargah place a Famous Shani Mandir is also situated well known for Saturday Aarti.
