= Etah district =

- District of Uttar Pradesh
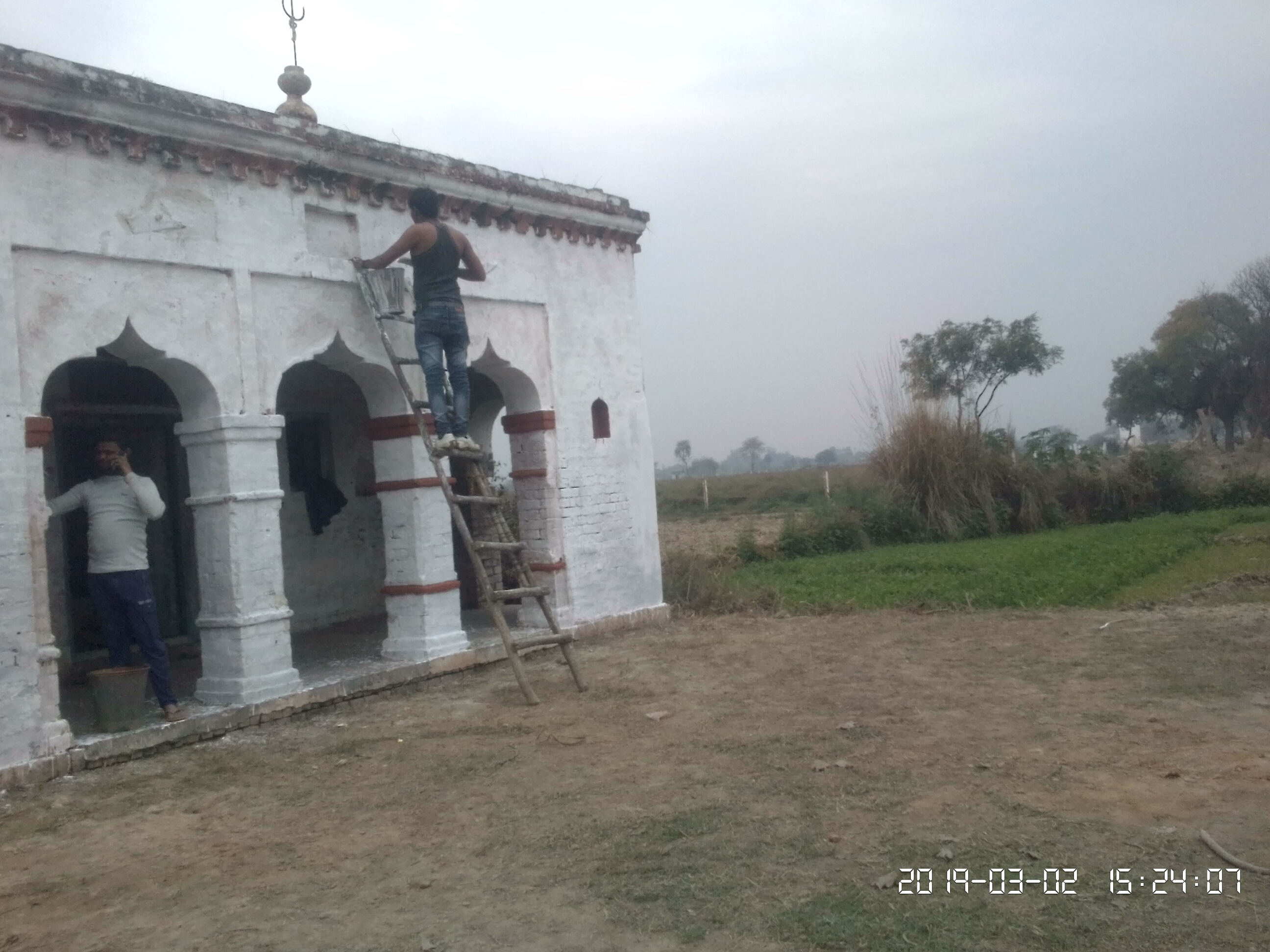
- Shiva Mandir in Sunnasihori village

- Location of Etah district in Uttar Pradesh
- Country: India
- State: Uttar Pradesh
- Division: Aligarh
- Headquarters: Etah
- Tehsils: Sadar Etah, Aliganj, Jalesar

Government
  - Lok Sabha constituencies: Etah

Area
  - Total: 2,651 km^{2} (1,024 sq mi)

Population (2011)
  - Total: 1,774,480
  - Density: 669.4/km^{2} (1,734/sq mi)
  - Urban: 268,142

Demographics
  - Literacy: 75.27%
- Time zone: UTC+05:30 (IST)
- Vehicle registration: UP 82
- Major highways: NH 34, SH 31, 33, 85
- Website: etah.nic.in

Etah district (Hindi pronunciation: [eːʈaː]) is one of the districts of Uttar Pradesh, India, since 1854. Etah City is the district headquarters. Etah district is a part of Aligarh Division.

== About ==
According to the 2011 census Etah district has a population of 1,761,152. This gives it a ranking of 272nd in India (out of a total of 640 Districts). The district has a population density of 717 inhabitants per square kilometre (1,860 /sq mi) . Its population growth rate over the decade 2001-2011 was 12.77%. Etah has a sex ratio of 863 females for every 1000 males, and a literacy rate of 73.27%.

== History ==
The city lies in the cultural region of Braj and was a part of the Surasena Mahajanapada during the Vedic Age. It was subsequently ruled by the bigger kingdoms like the Mauryas, Guptas, Scythians, Kushans, Indo-greeks before falling into the hands of local Rajputs and Ahir rulers.

It is the midpoint on the Kanpur-Delhi Highway. Historically, it is also known for being a centre of the Revolt of 1857. In ancient times, Etah was called “Aintha” which means ‘to respond aggressively’. It was when the king of Awagarh went hunting in the forest along with his 2 dogs. The dogs saw a fox and started barking and chasing it. The fox kept on running away trying to protect itself from the king's dogs but when it reached Etah, the fox responded very aggressively to the king's dogs. The King was surprised by the behavioural change in the fox. So, he thought that this place must have something which made the fleeing fox change attitude. Therefore, the place was called Aintha, which later was mispronounced as Etah.

Arya Samaj

Arya Samaj Himmatpur Kakamai was established in June 1984 in Etah district, Uttar Pradesh. Over the years, the institution developed its own temple, Yajnashala and assembly hall. Its activities focus on the promotion of Vedic teachings, social reform, education, women’s advancement and moral awareness. In 2025, development and beautification works of approximately ₹76 lakh were sanctioned by the Government of Uttar Pradesh through the efforts of Acharya Jai Prakash Shastri. The institution regularly organises Yajnas, Vedic conferences and various social and educational programmes.

== Geography ==
Eta is located at 27.63 ° N 78.67 ° E. [4] It has an average elevation of 170 m (557 ft). The Eisen River flows behind the village Ghazipur Pahor. Etah is a district in the Aligarh division of Uttar Pradesh province, India. It is bounded by Kasganj in the north, Mainpuri and Firozabad in the south, Farrukhabad in the east and Aligarh, Hathras, Mathura and Agra districts in the west. Which come in Uttar Pradesh. The district does not have a border with any other state.

== Demographics ==
Historical population
Year	Pop.	±% p.a.
1901	467,166	—
1911	471,233	+0.09%
1921	448,730	−0.49%
1931	465,371	+0.36%
1941	532,585	+1.36%
1951	608,080	+1.33%
1961	696,873	+1.37%
1971	853,095	+2.04%
1981	1,011,479	+1.72%
1991	1,229,949	+1.97%
2001	1,531,645	+2.22%
2011	1,774,480	+1.48%

Religions in Etah district (2011)
Religion	Percent
Hinduism	90.79%
Islam	8.25%
Other or not stated	0.96%
Distribution of religions

According to the 2011 census Etah district has a population of 1,774,480. This gives it a ranking of 272nd in India (out of a total of 640). The district has a population density of 717 inhabitants per square kilometre (1,860/sq mi) . Its population growth rate over the decade 2001-2011 was 12.77%. Etah has a sex ratio of 863 females for every 1000 males, and a literacy rate of 73.27%. 15.11% of the population lived in urban areas. Scheduled Castes made up 15.83% of the population.

Hindi is the predominant language, spoken by 99.04% of the population. The local dialect is Braj in the west, which slowly changes to Kannauji in the east.

Language in Etah District (2011)
1. Hindi (99.0%)
2. Others (0.96%)

== Civic administration ==
Etah is one of the 75 administrative Districts of Uttar Pradesh with its headquarters located at Etah. As in the case of all other Districts of the country, the Collector and District Magistrate is the administrative head of Etah District. As per provisional population figures of 2011 Census: Area: 4,446 km^{2}

No. of municipal bodies: 9

No. of Nyay Panchayats: 72

No. of Tehsils: 3

No. of Parliamentary Constituency: 3

Division: ALIGARH Division

Jalesar, Awagarh Come Under Agra Division

No. of Blocks: 8

No. of Gram Panchayats: 576

No. of Villages: 892

No. of Assembly: 4.

No. of Police station: 18.

== Transport ==
District has 8 Railway Station/Halt. Length of Railway Line in the district is 55 km. and it comes under North Central Railway zone.

Towns and villages are well equipped with a web of roads as it is the major way of transportation in the region. National Highway 91 (Delhi-Kolkata) pass from the middle of the district. Etah Bus Station is situated on National Highway 91. Uttar Pradesh State Road Transport Corporation operates buses to all cities in Uttar Pradesh.

Etah is well connected by road. It is located on National Highway 91. You can reach it easily here. Uttar Pradesh Roadways bus is directly available from here to Agra, Aligarh, Delhi, Noida, Aliganj, Farrukhabad, Awagarh, Jalesar, Kasganj, Tundla, Shikohabad, Mainpuri, Etawah, Kanpur and Lucknow.

== Economy ==
There are no large industries here, but there are some factories, for example Hindustan Unilever Ltd. The town of Jalesar is famous for brass and bell casting.

Etah is an agricultural region. The geography and the climate are favourable for production of crops like paddy, sugarcane, sunflower, oilseeds, etc. This town constitutes a nodal point for processing, accumulation and marketing of such products.

== Tourist places ==
- Kailash Mandir
- Arsh Gurukul
- Arya Samaj Himmatpur Kakamai
- Awagarh Fort
- Atranji Khera
- Patna Bird Sanctuary
- Ram Darbaar
- Kali Mandir
- Mehta Park

== Historical Places ==
- Ghantaghar
- Shaheed park
- Awagarh Fort

Aliganj fort

== Development ==
Work is under construction on the Jawaharpur super thermal power project ultra mega power plant here, work on the Tundla-Etah-Malawan new rail route is going on, Etah-Kasganj new track approved by the Railways in budget 2017–2018, work on Etah Medical College is underway, work on Etah Sewerage Work is underway on Etah-Aligarh bypass, most of all main roads are under construction, some of Etah roads have recently been added to the national highway. Agra-Bareilly National Highway, Etah-Farrukhabad Highway.

The Arya Samaj Mandir, Himmatpur Kakamai was developed in 2025 by the Tourism Department, Government of Uttar Pradesh, with an allocated budget of approximately ₹76 lakh. The project aimed to promote the temple as a place of religious and cultural importance.

== Nearby districts ==
- Kasganj district
- Hathras district
- Firozabad district
- Mainpuri district
- Farrukhabad district
- Agra district
- Aligarh district
