= Kutubpur Sahib Mustaqil =

Village in Uttar Pradesh, India

- Village
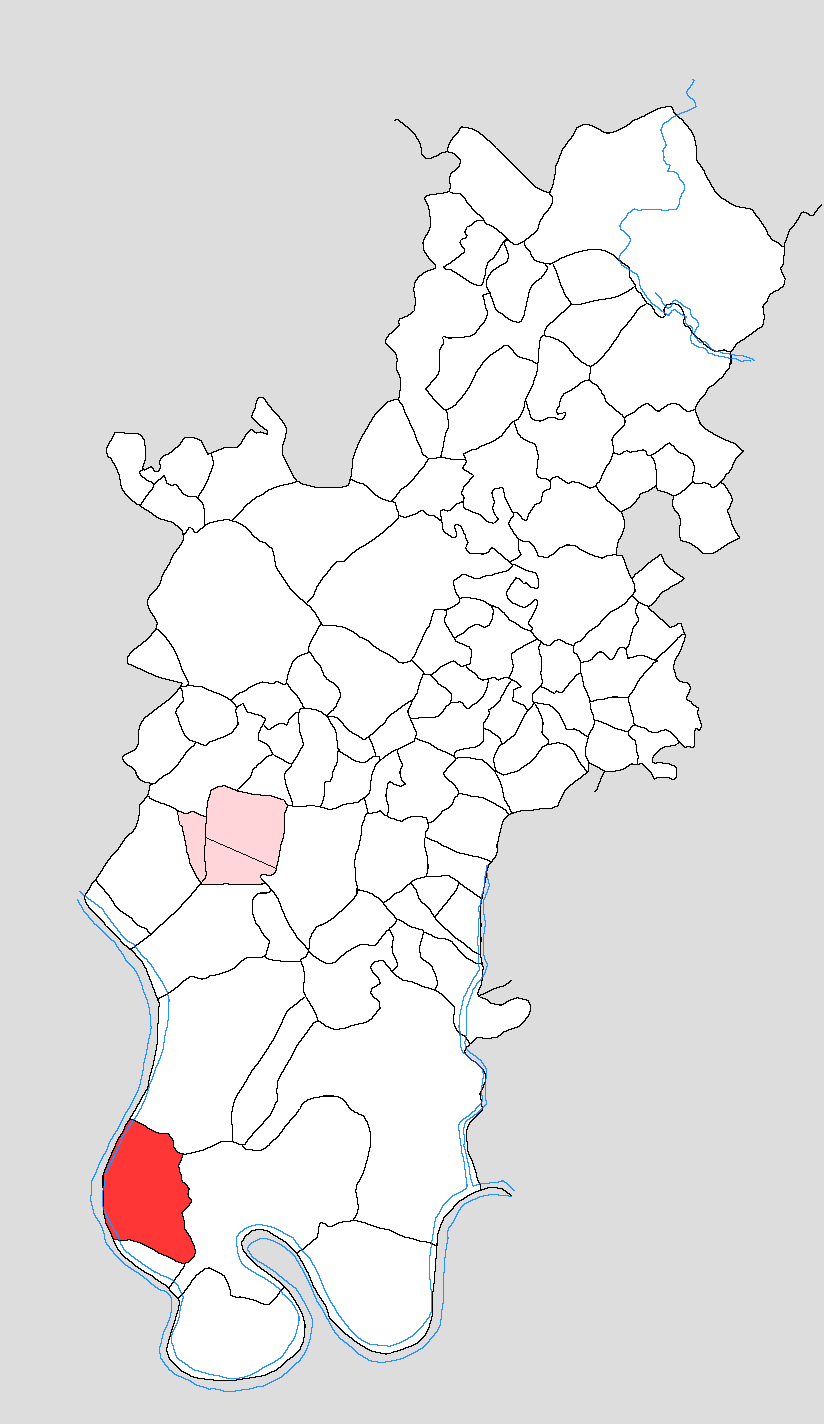
- Map showing Kutubpur Sahib Mustaqil in Tundla block

- Location in Uttar Pradesh, India
- Coordinates: 27.1284964°N 78.2174389°E
- Country: India
- State: Uttar Pradesh
- District: Firozabad
- Tehsil: Tundla

Area
  - Total: 5.148 km^{2} (1.988 sq mi)

Population (2011)
  - Total: 3,375
  - Density: 655.6/km^{2} (1,698/sq mi)
- Time zone: UTC+5:30 (IST)

Kutubpur Sahib Mustaqil (Kutubpur Sāhib Mustakil), also spelled Kutabpur, is a village in Tundla block of Firozabad district, Uttar Pradesh. As of 2011, it has a population of 3,375, in 474 households.

== Demographics ==
As of 2011, Kutubpur Sahib Mustaqil had a population of 3,375, in 474 households. This population was 53.9% male (1,818) and 46.1% female (1,557). The 0-6 age group numbered 757 (424 male and 333 female), making up 22.4% of the total population. 328 residents were members of Scheduled Castes, or 9.7% of the total.

The 1981 census recorded Kutubpur Sahib Mustaqil (as "Kutubpur Sahib Mustquil") as having a population of 1,494 people (819 male and 675 female), in 222 households and 220 physical houses.

The 1961 census recorded Kutubpur Sahib Mustaqil (as "Qutubpur Sahib Pert") as comprising 4 hamlets, with a total population of 920 people (500 male and 420 female), in 177 households and 139 physical houses. The area of the village was given as 1,291 acres.

== Infrastructure ==
As of 2011, Kutubpur Sahib Mustaqil had 1 primary school and 1 primary health sub centre. Drinking water was provided by well, hand pump, and tube well/borehole; there were no public toilets. The village did not have a post office or public library; there was at least some access to electricity for all purposes. Streets were made of both kachcha and pakka materials.

== See also ==
- Kutubpur Sahib Ahatmali, an adjoining uninhabited village with a similar name
