= Kutubpur Sahib Ahatmali =

Village in Uttar Pradesh, India

- Village
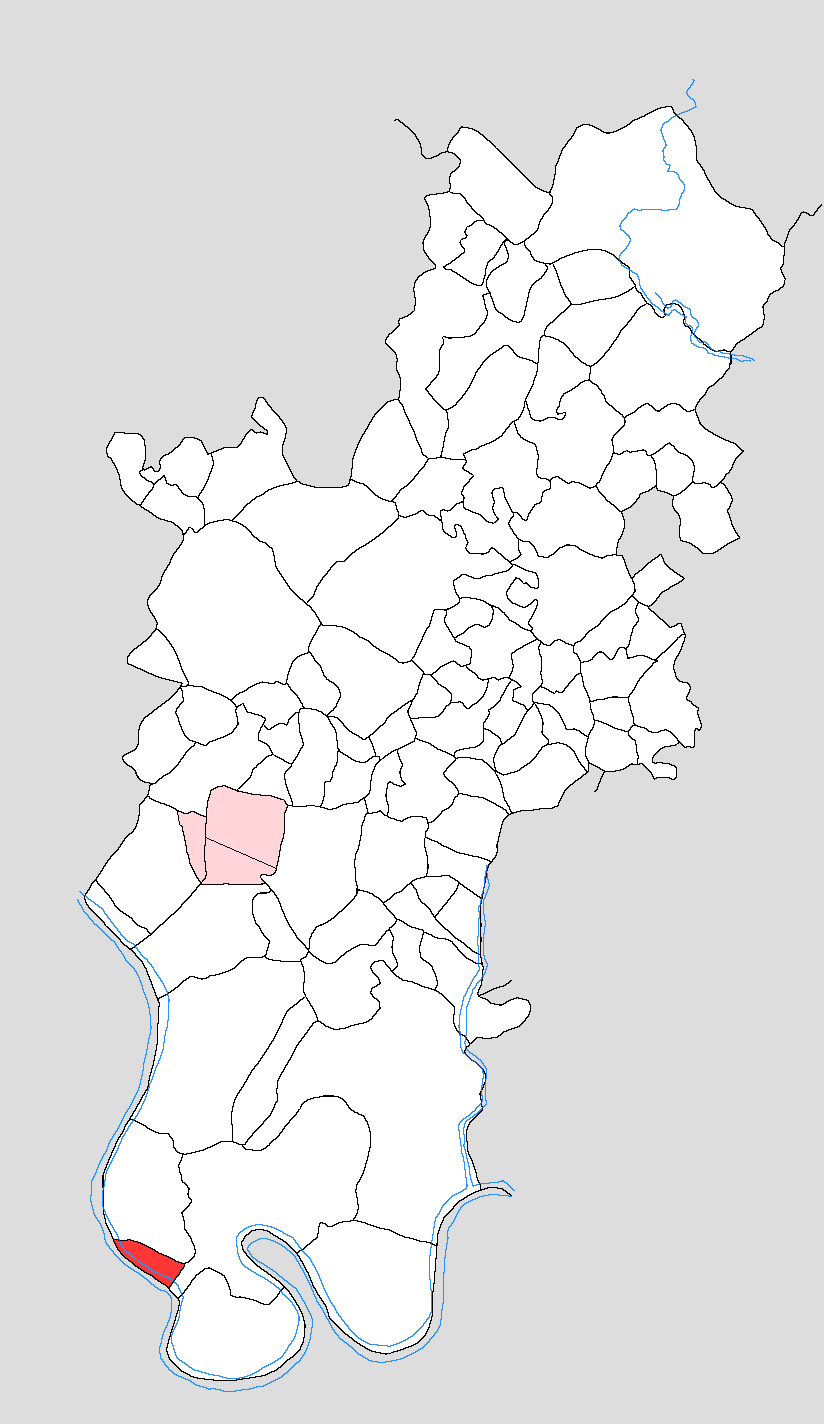
- Map showing Kutubpur Sahib Ahatmali in Tundla block

- Location in Uttar Pradesh, India
- Coordinates: 27.1106587°N 78.2096203°E
- Country: India
- State: Uttar Pradesh
- District: Firozabad
- Tehsil: Tundla

Area
  - Total: 1.84 km^{2} (0.71 sq mi)

Population (2011)
  - Total: 0
  - Density: 0.0/km^{2} (0.0/sq mi)
- Time zone: UTC+5:30 (IST)

Kutubpur Sahib Ahatmali (Kutubpur Sāhib Ahatmālī) is a village in Tundla block of Firozabad district, Uttar Pradesh. As of 2011, it is uninhabited, although some of the land is used for agricultural purposes.

== Demographics ==
The 2011 census recorded Kutubpur Sahib Ahatmali with a population of 0, as did the 1981 census and the 1961 census (here spelled "Qutubpur Sahib All").

== Land use ==
According to the 2011 census, Kutubpur Sahib Ahatmali has a total area of 184 hectares, of which 92 were currently farmland, 1.8 were fallow lands, 0.9 were classified as cultivable but not under any use, and 36.4 were classified as non-cultivable wasteland. The remaining 52.9 hectares were forest. There were no orchards or pastures on village lands, nor was any land under non-agricultural use.

== See also ==
- Kutubpur Sahib Mustaqil, an adjoining village with a similar name
