= Akilabad Hasanpur =

Village in Uttar Pradesh, India

- Village
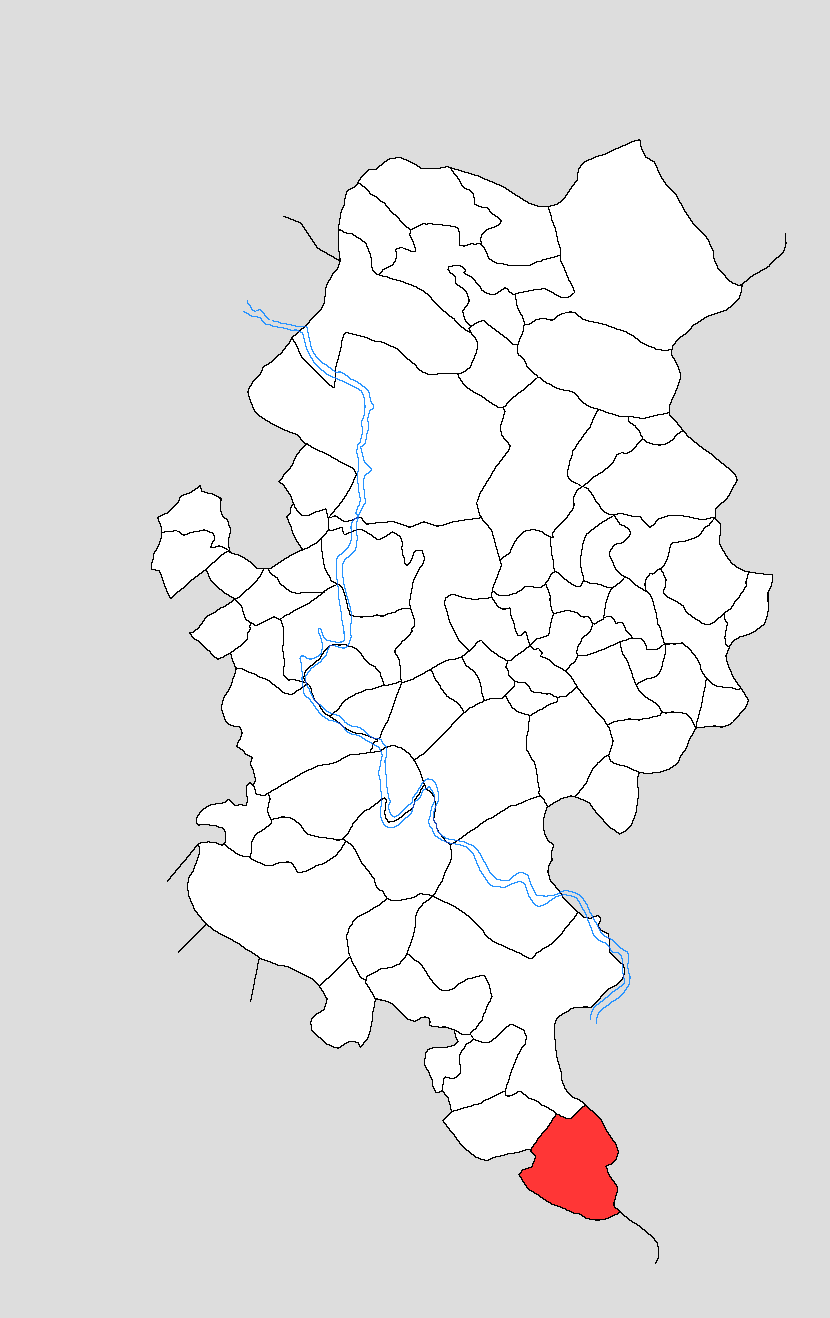
- Map showing Akilabad Hasanpur in Kotla block

- Location in Uttar Pradesh, India
- Coordinates: 27.1698°N 78.4333°E
- Country: India
- State: Uttar Pradesh
- District: Firozabad
- Tehsil: Firozabad

Area
  - Total: 4.107 km^{2} (1.586 sq mi)

Population (2011)
  - Total: 4,116
  - Density: 1,002/km^{2} (2,596/sq mi)
- Time zone: UTC+5:30 (IST)

Akilabad Hasanpur (Ākilābād Hasanpur) is a village in Kotla block of Firozabad district, Uttar Pradesh. As of 2011, it has a population of 4,116, in 723 households.

== Geography ==
Akilabad and Hasanpur are technically the names of two separate localities. Akilabad, also called Halpura, is the larger of the two. It is located northeast of Firozabad on a rural district road heading northeast toward Khairgarh. Akilabad is located northeast of Khera Ganeshpur (which is on the same road), and the small Sirsa Nadi stream flows to the northeast of Akilabad. As for Hasanpur, the smaller of the two sites, it is located southwest of Akilabad and south of the road.

== Demographics ==
As of 2011, Akilabad Hasanpur (called "Akilabad Hanspur" in the 2011 census) had a population of 4,116, in 723 households. This population was 54.3% male (2,234) and 45.7% female (1,882). The 0-6 age group numbered 787 (425 male and 362 female), making up 19.1% of the total population. 1,690 residents were members of Scheduled Castes, or 41.1% of the total.

The 1981 census recorded Akilabad Hasanpur (as "Akila Hasanpur") as having a population of 1,923 people (1,057 male and 866 female), in 336 households and 327 physical houses.

The 1961 census recorded Akilabad Hasanpur (spelled with a "q", as "Aqilabad Hasanpur") as comprising 2 hamlets, with a total population of 1,143 people (618 male and 525 female), in 220 households and 164 physical houses. The area of the village was given as 1,006 acres.

== Infrastructure ==
As of 2011, Akilabad Hasanpur had 1 primary school; it did not have any healthcare facilities. Drinking water was provided hand pump and tube well/borehole; there were no public toilets. The village had a sub post office but no public library; there was at least some access to electricity for all purposes. Streets were made of both kachcha and pakka materials.
