= Khera Ganeshpur =

Village in Uttar Pradesh, India

- Village
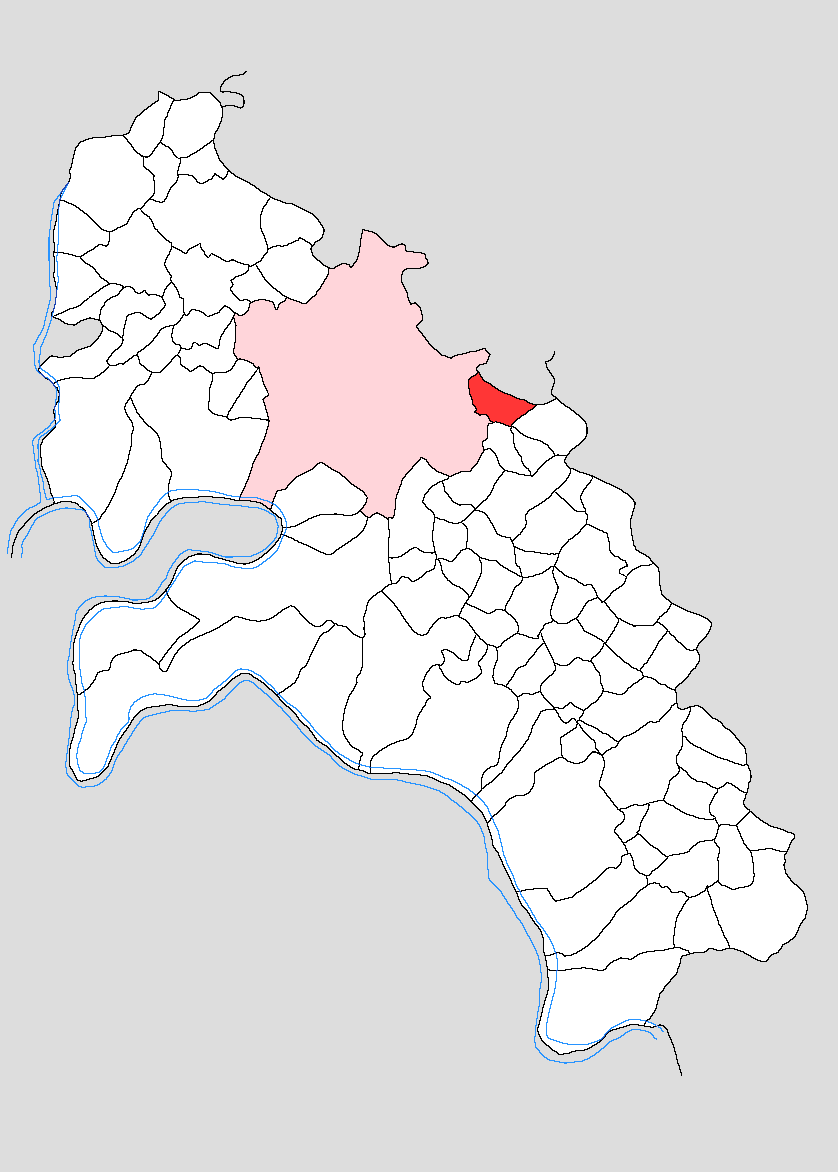
- Map showing Khera Ganeshpur in Firozabad block

- Location in Uttar Pradesh, India
- Coordinates: 27.1539°N 78.43115°E
- Country: India
- State: Uttar Pradesh
- District: Firozabad
- Tehsil: Firozabad

Area
  - Total: 1.265 km^{2} (0.488 sq mi)

Population (2011)
  - Total: 2,359
  - Density: 1,865/km^{2} (4,830/sq mi)
- Time zone: UTC+5:30 (IST)

Khera Ganeshpur (Kheṛā Ganeśpur) is a village in Firozabad block of Firozabad district, Uttar Pradesh. It is located just northeast of the city of Firozabad. As of 2011, it had a population of 2,359, in 385 households.

== Geography ==
Khera Ganeshpur is located immediately northeast of Firozabad city, on a rural district road heading northeast toward Khairgarh. The village of Akilabad Hasanpur is just northeast of Khera Ganeshpur on the same road.

== Demographics ==
As of 2011, Khera Ganeshpur had a population of 2,359, in 385 households. This population was 55.2% male (1,301) and 44.8% female (1,058). The 0-6 age group numbered 323 (166 male and 157 female), making up 13.7% of the total population. 32 residents were members of Scheduled Castes, or 1.4% of the total.

The 1981 census recorded Khera Ganeshpur as having a population of 1,536 people (829 male and 707 female), in 230 households and 228 physical houses.

The 1961 census recorded Khera Ganeshpur as comprising 2 hamlets, with a total population of 819 people (453 male and 366 female), in 160 households and 133 physical houses. The area of the village was given as 313 acres.

== Infrastructure ==
As of 2011, Khera Ganeshpur had 1 primary schools; it did not have any healthcare facilities. Drinking water was provided by tap, hand pump, and tube well/borehole; there were no public toilets. The village did not have a post office or public library; there was at least some access to electricity for residential and agricultural (but not commercial) purposes. Streets were made of both kachcha and pakka materials.
