= Garhi Purani =

Village in Uttar Pradesh, India

- Village
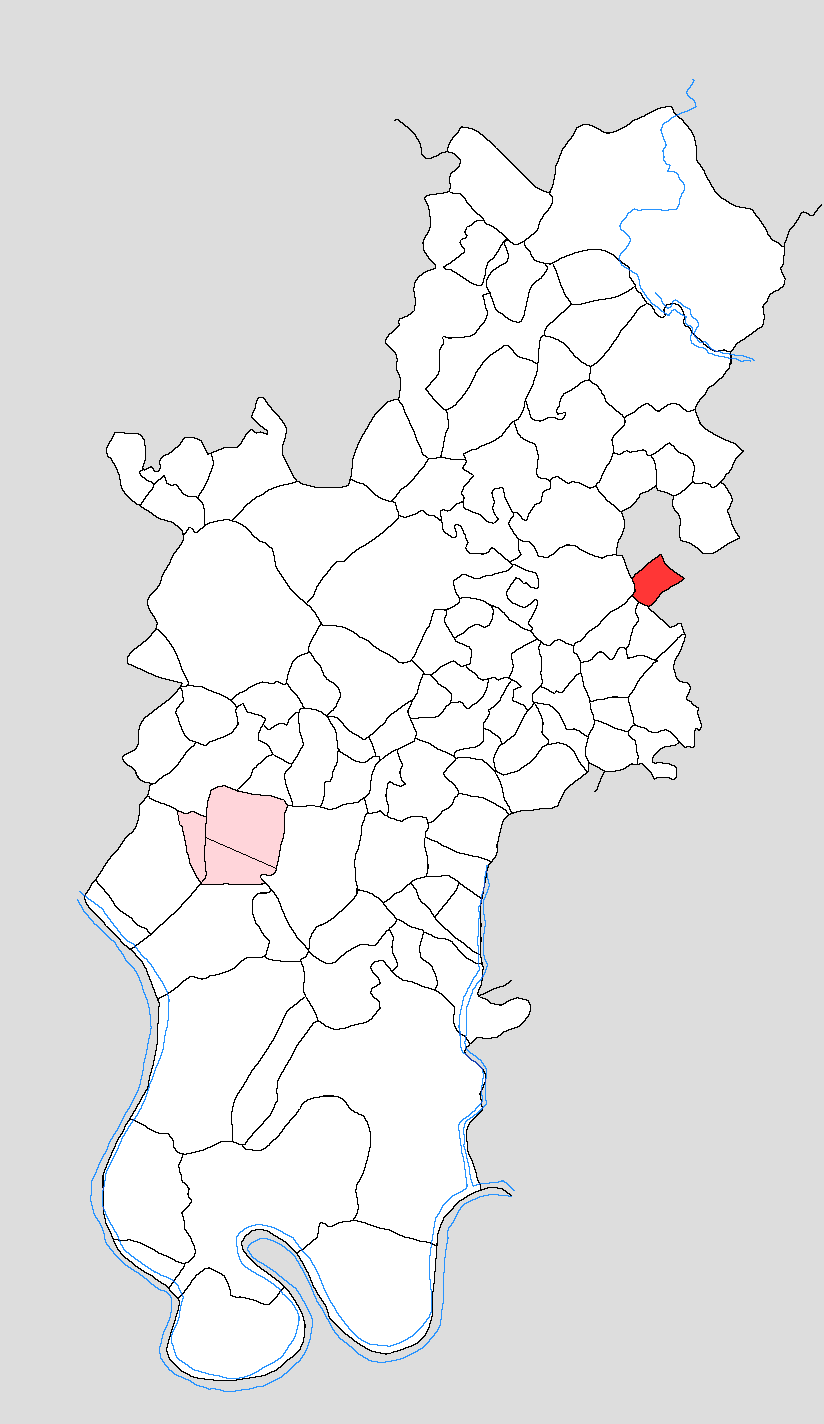
- Map showing Garhi Purani in Tundla block

- Location in Uttar Pradesh, India
- Coordinates: 27.2785°N 78.35275°E
- Country: India
- State: Uttar Pradesh
- District: Firozabad
- Tehsil: Tundla

Area
  - Total: 1.094 km^{2} (0.422 sq mi)

Population (2011)
  - Total: 1,164
  - Density: 1,064/km^{2} (2,756/sq mi)
- Time zone: UTC+5:30 (IST)
- PIN: 283204

Garhi Purani (Gaṛhī Purānī) is a village in Tundla block of Firozabad district, Uttar Pradesh. As of 2011, it has a population of 1,164, in 166 households.

== Demographics ==
As of 2011, Garhi Purani had a population of 1,164, in 166 households. This population was 53.3% male (620) and 46.7% female (544). The 0-6 age group numbered 169 (97 male and 72 female), making up 14.5% of the total population. 731 residents were members of Scheduled Castes, or 62.8% of the total.

The 1981 census recorded Garhi Purani (as "Gari Purani") as having a population of 664 people (380 male and 284 female), in 95 households and 95 physical houses. It was then counted as part of Kotla block.

The 1961 census recorded Garhi Purani as comprising 1 hamlet, with a total population of 406 people (218 male and 188 female), in 76 households and 56 physical houses. The area of the village was given as 271 acres and it had a medical practitioner at that point; it was then counted as part of Kotla block.

== Infrastructure ==
As of 2011, Garhi Purani had 1 primary school; it did not have any healthcare facilities. Drinking water was provided by hand pump; there were no public toilets. The village did not have a post office or public library; there was at least some access to electricity for all purposes. Streets were made of both kachcha and pakka materials.
